= Bank Hall (disambiguation) =

Bank Hall or Bankhall may refer to:

- Bank Hall, a Jacobean manor in Bretherton, Lancashire, United Kingdom
  - Bank Hall Estate, the estate belonging to the above
  - Bank Hall Gardens, the immediate grounds belonging to the above
  - Bank Hall Action Group, a charity looking after the above
- Bank Hall, the original name for Warrington Town Hall in Warrington, United Kingdom
- Bank Hall Colliery a coal mine in Burnley, Lancashire.
- Bank Hall railway station, a station serving the Kirkdale area of Liverpool, United Kingdom
- Bankhall Villa AFC, a defunct football team from Chapelhall, North Lanarkshire, United Kingdom
