= Bank Hall Estate =

Estate in Lancashire, England

Coordinates: 53.6756°N 2.8151°W

The Bank Hall Estate is the demesne of the Jacobean mansion house of Bank Hall, including much of land around the village of Bretherton, which is owned by the Lilford Trust.

== History ==
The Estate began when the Banastre family moved to Lancashire from Prestatyn, North Wales in 1240. The estate covers many acres of land that surround a Jacobean hall constructed by the family in 1608 (on the site of a much older building), situated to the west of the village of Bretherton. The Banastre's Estate and wealth grew from farming and leasing land, which continues to this very day with the current management.

== Management and ownership ==
The Estate is owned by the Lilford Trust and managed by Acland Bracewell Surveyors Limited who also manage properties in the villages of Bretherton, Croston, Hesketh Bank, Mere Brow, Much Hoole, Rufford, Sollom and Tarleton, In summer 2009, the Bank Hall mansion and 18 acres (73,000 m^{2}) of gardens was signed in a 999-year lease from the Lilford Estates over to the Heritage Trust for the North West and Bank Hall Action Group, with plans for restoration.

== Bretherton Village ==
The present Bretherton includes the ancient village of Thorp, the position of which appears to have left no trace. Bretherton village for most of its existence was an almost self-supporting, self-contained 'subsistence agrarian economy'. Major changes to the village have occurred within living memory; well-paid employment opportunities coupled with rationalisation of farming facilitated people to escape their low income agrarian lifestyle and move to local urban centres. Since then the village has become a dormitory village, with the majority of the residential properties now owned by their residents, but some are still leased from the estates. As the decline in British farming affected the village population and agricultural industry, many of the farms and barns have been converted into residential properties attracting wealth.

== Key ==
Grade	Criteria
Grade II*	Particularly important buildings of more than special interest.
Grade II	Buildings of national importance and special interest.

== Features ==
Features within the Bank Hall Estate range from listed buildings and gardens to natural geographic features.

Name	Photograph	Grade	Date	Notes
River Douglas	The River Douglas from the Bank Hall grounds	N/A		The River Douglas had a major impact on the local landscape as a large embankment was constructed to provide defence from the tidal river waters. There are numerous land drains and ditches from the estate which drain into the river, the bridge behind the Bank Hall Lodge crosses one of them. The Douglas Navigation provided coal movements from Wigan, but when the Rufford Branch of the Leeds and Liverpool Canal was constructed the Douglas was returned to its state as a river.
Bank Bridge	Bank Bridge, the warehouse, which carries the A59 road over the River Douglas	II	Built: 1790 Canal Bridge and Warehouse, 1821 Tarleton Bridge	Bank Bridge consists of two bridges that carries the A59 road over the Leeds and Liverpool Canal and the River Douglas, which cross the estate on the west side. Both the Canal Bridge No. 11 (built 1790) and Tarleton Bridge (built 1821 using a previous bridge footings) are Grade II listed structures as is the Bank Hall Warehouse which is situated between them. The warehouse was constructed in 1790 of Red brick in an English garden wall bond, with sandstone dressings, a slate roof. The warehouse is a rectangular plan with three bays and three storeys and was used for storage for goods and crops from the farms which were transferred to canal boats to be taken to market. The warehouse and yard are still used by the estates. A photograph from 1910 shows the bridge before it was extended. Due to the nature of the sharp bend on the bridge, it is a well known locally as a black spot for road traffic accidents. In 2012 restoration work was carried out to the bridge to repair the stone wall to the south which had been damaged during a collision, with the speed limit reduced to 40 mph over the bridge.
Bank Hall Lodge	Bank Hall Main Entrance Lodge	II	Built: 1830s	The building next to Bank Bridge was a gate house to the mansion known as 'Bank Hall Lodge'. Behind it is a small bridge which was restored in 2006 by the tenants. The building is owned by the estate and is private property. There is no access to the hall due to increased traffic on the A59 road. The building is also known as "Bank Lodge", and can be seen on the 1928 Ordnance Survey Map. A notable feature was the large Beech tree at the front of the building, it is recorded in 1896 that the tree was to be taken down, but was saved by Mrs Powys (Lady Lilford) as she wanted to consult her husband about its removal. The tree towered over the Lodge until June 2013 when a decision was made by the estate to cut it down. In October 2013 extensive work was carried out by the estate to restore the slate roof.
Bank Hall Farm	A view of the Bank Hall farm house	II	Built: Early 17th century Extended: 18th century	Bank Hall Farm, the home farm is situated opposite the potting sheds at the north end of the walled garden to the east of the house. The farm house failed to be sold in 2008, and continues to be leased by the Estates. The pigsties have been demolished, but other outbuildings survive and the farm yard pond has since been filled in.
Bank Hall Mansion	A view of Bank Hall from the tower lawn	II*	Built: 1608; Extended: 1832/1833; Renovated: 2017–2021	Bank Hall is the centrepiece to the Estate and was where for years the owners of the estate lived until the death of the last resident owner, George Anthony Legh Keck in 1860. The current house was built on site of a much older house. The east wing courtyard was demolished in 1940s while occupied by the army. The building was left since 1972 to fall into disrepair, however the Bank Hall Action Group formed in 1995, continue to raise funds and public awareness, and the hall was finally restored and renovated into several luxury apartments in 2017–2021.
Bank Hall Gardens	A view of the snowdrops in the gardens at Bank Hall	Some Trees Under Preservation	First Landscaped: Pre–1608; Renovated: 1995–Present	Bank Hall Gardens is the 18 acres of immediate grounds to surround the Mansion House, the gardens have many specimen trees including what is thought to be the oldest yew tree in Lancashire. The arboretum planted by George Anthony Legh Keck, with numerous varieties of flowers. The walled garden is a key feature and there are plans to renovate it and the greenhouse into a 'heritage garden' as part of a separate restoration project to the house. The Bank Hall Action Group have been clearing the grounds since 1995, and continue to hold events in the gardens. The gardens are not listed, but some of the trees are under preservation orders.
Bank Hall Barn	The Bank Hall Barn prior to restoration in 2003	II	Built: 1580s Extended: 18th century Restored and Converted: 2004	Bank Hall Barn is a grade II listed Elizabethan long barn which was built in the 1580s. The barn was extended to the east in the early 19th century and used as a tithe barn for the Estate. In 2004, after years of neglect, it was converted into residences. The barn is 75 metres (246 ft) long, and once housed animals, the hay barn, and farm machinery. During the 1930s the East end of the barn was used by the Seddon-Brown family for housing their Bentleys. The area between the fields by the A59 road and the barns was once the "Timber Yard", and now is the site of garages, a gym and private gardens. Before redevelopment the Timber Yard was neglected and a store for old farm machinery.
Coach House Building	The Bank Hall Coach House Building in 2010	II	Built: early 17th century Extended: 18th century	Coach House Building The Estate offices, blacksmith's forge and coach house were housed in the building in the centre of the farm. The Estate offices moved into the hall at the end of the Second World War. The forge was used from the early 20th century by gamekeepers for their 'shoot' in the estate, and this section of the building is still used by the 'Bank Hall Gun Club'. The coach house, was where the coaches were maintained and has its own inspection pit. The building was mostly vacant until 1999 when the estates gave the Bank Hall Action Group permission to use the coach house as a refreshments area and the Estate offices as a visitor centre, which opened in 2000. On 20 January 2007 the visitor centre suffered a fire, causing smoke damage, and a temporary visitor center was opened in the coach house, while the refreshments moved to the farm house kitchen for the snowdrop events in 2007. The Coach House continues to function as a visitor centre while the estate office remains derelict.
Carriage Drive	Bank Hall Carriage Drive looking from the Gamekeepers Lodge towards Bretherton Lodge	Not Listed	Built: 17th century Re-diverted: 19th century	The Carriage Drive cuts through the parkland, connecting the hall to the village of Bretherton. It is lined with Lime trees and Rhododendron bushes and has the following three buildings on it.
Crossford Lodge	A view of the old gardener's house which is now the Bank Hall Kindergarten	Not Listed	Built: 19th century Extended & Renovated: 1980s	Crossford Lodge was the gardener's house occupied by Charles Thompson, the Head Gardener. He worked at for the estate from the age of 16 until he died in his 90s. The Crossford Lodge gardens once had Yew trees but these were removed in 2001 due to the poisonous berries they produce. The house can be seen as 'Crossford Lodge' on the 1828 ordnance survey map, before it was extended and became the 'Bank Hall Kindergarten' in 1990.
Gamekeeper's Lodge	A view of the now demolished Gamekeeper's House that was on the Bank Hall Carriage drive	Not Listed	Built: 20th century Demolished and new construction: 2008	Gamekeeper's Lodge was the next building that could be seen on the carriage drive; it was sold on 11 January 2007 then demolished in 2008 and replaced by a modern single-story building. The Gamekeeper's Lodge once had aviaries which were used for breeding Pheasants for the shoots held on the estate.
Bretherton Lodge	A view of Bretherton Lodge at Bank Hall from the road	Not Listed	Built: 19th century	Bretherton Lodge is a red brick building at the end of the carriage drive by the gate. It may be referred to as 'The New Lodge' (1928 Ordnance Survey Map). The Estate manager's books from the 19th century refer to the labour and materials required to construct the 'New Lodge'. The Thompson family lived here for many years; Charles Thompson lived here as a boy. The building is today leased by the estate.
Bank Hall Windmill		II	Built: 1741; Renovated: 1950s	The first Bank Hall windmill was constructed in 1741. Local maps from 1845 show 'Bank Mill' between Bank Bridge and Plocks Farm (just off the A59 road) within the estate. The Windmill was formerly a three storeys high corn mill which was converted into private housing in the 1950s. The Kneen family lived in the northwest wing of the mansion house while the work was in progress. Today the windmill is a Grade II listed building and stands as a reminder of the corn trade that used to thrive in the area.
Carr House	The front entrance porch at Carr House which has the same brickwork as Bank Hall	II*	Built: 1613	Carr House is a house on the estate built by the Stone family in 1613 and was once the home of Jeremiah Horrocks, the first person to predict and observe the Transit of Venus, in 1639. It is thought that Jeremiah was the tutor of the Stone family's children while he resided with them at Carr House.
St John the Baptist's Church, Bretherton	St John's Church, Bretherton.	II	Built: 1839	St John the Baptist's Church, Bretherton is the Anglican Church in the village of Bretherton. The church is the resting place of the Clare family who resided at Bank Hall during the early 20th Century.

== Future development ==
In February 2011 planning permission was granted for Bank Hall Action Group and Urban Splash to restore the mansion house, and its surrounding 18 acres of gardens and walled garden/ greenhouse area into residential dwellings with a heritage garden, visitor centre and tearoom. To enable the project to succeed there is a need to build enabling development on the old orchard site next to the Bank Hall walled garden, therefore reducing the impact on the historic building and gardens. The plans will include a refurbishment to the access road to Bank Hall, with traditional estate fencing and walls re-constructed and the re-planting of hedges and trees to prevent further visual impact to the local area and wildlife.

== See also ==
- Bank Hall
- Bank Hall Action Group
- Bank Hall Gardens
- Carr House
- Bretherton
