= Friends of Bank Hall =

Voluntary group

Friends of Bank Hall (formerly the Bank Hall Action Group)
- Abbreviation: FBH (formerly BHAG)
- Formation: FBH 2012, BHAG 1995
- Legal status: Charitable Trust
- Purpose: To rescue and restore Bank Hall, Bretherton
- Headquarters: Bretherton, United Kingdom
- Location: United Kingdom
- Region served: Bank Hall Estate
- Members: 40+
- Official language: English
- Chairman: John Howard
- Parent organization: Heritage Trust for the North West
- Affiliations: Bank Hall Action Group#Associated groups
- Budget: Donations and membership
- Volunteers: 18
- Website: www.bankhall.org

The Friends of Bank Hall is the new charitable name for the former Bank Hall Action Group who are a voluntary group which aims to raise public awareness and secure the future restoration of Bank Hall, a Jacobean mansion house and gardens, near the banks of the River Douglas, in Bretherton, Lancashire.

The group is affiliated to the Heritage Trust for the North West, which has assisted in raising awareness and will run a visitor centre at Bank Hall when the building is restored.

== Formation ==
=== Bank Hall Action Group ===
After local interest, John Quirk, a Chorley Guardian journalist, created a "Save Bank Hall" campaign. The first article appeared on 12 July 1995, asking the public to help the save the building. John Quirk met Gordon Johnson from Bretherton and Carol Anne Strange from Leyland who were among the people who replied and suggested an 'Action Group' to save Bank Hall.

=== Friends of Bank Hall ===
In 2011, the Bank Hall Action Group needed to achieve charity status to enable the restoration project to continue to the next level due to the campaign progression. From 2012 the Bank Hall Action Group will run alongside the new charity group and will gradually be phased out and all work, events and plans will be managed by the Friends of Bank Hall. As of May 2012 the membership for both groups became combined. In November 2011 the constitutions were agreed and submitted to the charity commission. As of 6 June 2012 the Friends of Bank Hall was officially a registered charity.

=== Meetings ===
The first meeting of the Bank Hall Action Group was held on 26 July 1995 at The De Trafford Arms public house in Croston. The Group have met on the first Wednesday of every month since, with an Annual General Meeting held at the May/June meeting. The Lord Nelson public house in Croston was a regular meeting place for the group, which featured in part of the Bank Hall Restoration Campaign in the BBC's Restoration television series of 2003. The FBH and BHAG meetings are now combined and continue to meet once a month.

=== Group structure ===
The Bank Hall Action Group comprised a group chairman, vice-chairman, treasurer, secretary, press officer and membership secretary, along with general members and friends of the group. In 2012, when the group gained their charitable status and became 'The Friends of Bank Hall', the group structure changed to become a 16-member trustee group which included the above structure along with general group members. The friends of the group merged in with the general membership.

The friends also have a non membership volunteer role, these are people who want to help, but on a less formal position as a member who attend meetings and assist with the group subcommittees. Volunteers attend to help the members at events and with maintaining the gardens.

Chairman
Name	Period position held
Gordon Johnson	1998–2001
Geoffrey Coxhead	2001–2003
Janet Edwards	2003 – June 2021
John Howard	July 2021 – Present

== Achievements ==
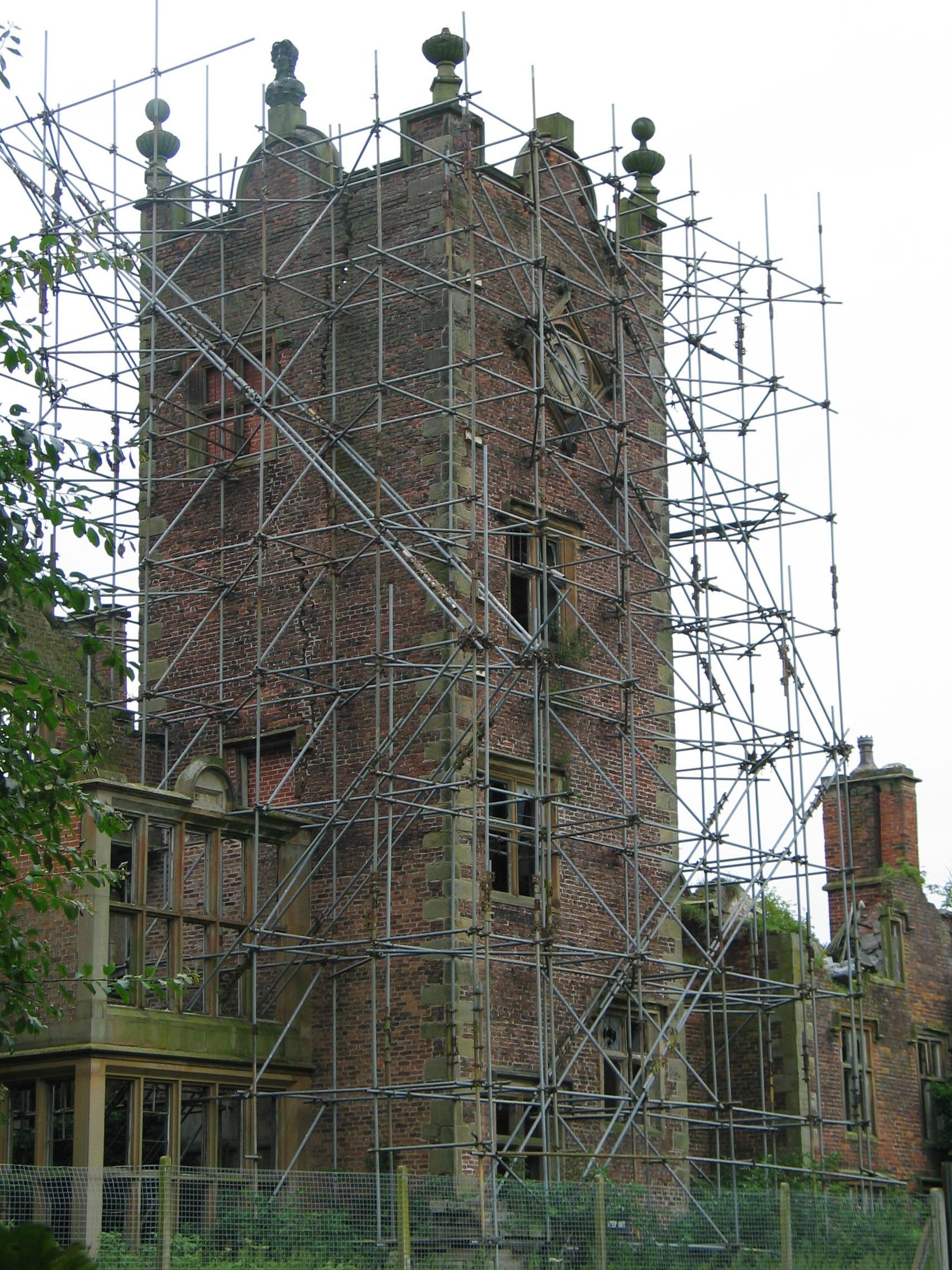
The Bank Hall clock tower with scaffolding in 2008.

On Tuesday 26 September 1995, a conference was held in the council chamber at Chorley Town Hall, the first achievement of the campaign. The outcome was to carry out a feasibility study on the hall. In December 1995, the group's first chairman, Gordon Johnson, met Lord Lilford's agent, who gave the group permission to access to the grounds. Work started to clear the undergrowth to access the building. The group cleared the walled garden and the perimeter of the hall where a security fence was erected enabling public access to be granted to the grounds and trees were cut down creating an area for events. The hall was cleared of debris, bricks were stored and visitors taken on tours of the parts of the house that were accessible. A feasibility study carried out by Niall Philips of Bristol in 1996 reported that it was feasible, practical and desirable to save Bank Hall. On 14 February 2012, it was announced that the £1.69 million from the Heritage Lottery Fund had been awarded for the restoration project to commence. Work on the building is scheduled to begin in late 2012.

=== Projects ===
- "Tower Appeal" was launched in 1996 with the aim of securing funds for scaffolding to prevent the tower from further collapse. In 1998 scaffolding was erected around the tower to prevent further collapse. The £32,000 cost was partly funded by the sales of the first edition of the Bank Hall Red Book which was published in the same year.
- "The Million Pennies Appeal" was launched in 2006 and raised over £1,000 towards the restoration project. The Appeal was closed in 2010 so that efforts could be concentrated on the Moment in Time Appeal.
- "Moment in Time Appeal" was launched in 2008 to raise funds for the restoration of the tower clocks.
- "Potting Shed Project" was launched in 2011 to prepare the potting sheds and greenhouse area for restoration with help from volunteers.

== Further work ==
The house deteriorated dramatically since the group was formed, however the gardens have developed with paths constructed to access areas that have been cleared and reveal the lost snowdrop carpets. Specimen trees have been identified and named with new specimens planted for the future. The removal, storage and cataloguing of remaining artifacts continues, along with research and events. Tours are now limited to the exterior of the building as deterioration has made the building unsafe for visitor access. It is hoped that visitors will be able to access the building once the new visitor centre opens in the tower and connected rooms.

=== Research ===
There is ongoing research into the residents, the grounds, uses and visitors, garden research, artifact storage, documentation and conservation. There is interest from students at Runshaw College and the University of Central Lancashire. The Forensic Science and Archaeology departments at the University of Central Lancashire visit Bank Hall to carry out excavations which have uncovered lost garden walls, Edwardian coins in the walled garden and clay pipes on the tower lawn. A number of wartime artifacts have also been unearthed including bullets, light bulbs and date stamps. In late 2010 a bookplate featuring George Anthony Legh Keck's coat of arms (carved in stone above the main entrance of the hall) was found, suggesting an earlier example of the arms, which is thought to be from before his marriage to Elizabeth Atherton, which has been considered a major find for the groups research into the family history.

During the restoration work a date stone with the initials "A.B." was discovered when an internal wall was removed and it is believed that this stone and the walls around it date to the mid-1500s and represent Adam Banastre, proving that the earlier building that predates the 1608 building still exists and can be seen with the decorative diaper work to the left of the front porch.

== Events ==
Bank Hall Action Group hosted many events ranging from family fun days and barbecues to theatre company productions ever since the first open day in 1999 following the erection of a security fence around the house. As of 1 January 2012 the Friends of Bank Hall took over the management of events which continue throughout the year. The most popular events are 'Snowdrop Sundays' which are held in February each year. The 'Easter Egg Trail' is popular with children with over 400 visitors on Easter Sunday 2010.

A 'Classic Car and Motor Show' has increased in popularity as the event has become established. Visitors come from all over the country to enter cars in the competition for 'Best Vehicle on Show' and view the display. As of 2011 the Action Group have put a ban of the admission of dogs (except guide dogs) into the grounds at their events due to health risks and considerations with the natural wildlife. The Friends of Bank Hall continued the dog ban for child friendly events and have adopted this into their policies. However, dogs are welcome to attend the events but must be kept on short leads.

== BBC Restoration Campaign ==
In 2002 the group was approached by the producers of a television program which would feature 30 buildings in need of restoration in ten regional heats. Money raised from a telephone vote was added to a £3million prize fund. The group accepted and Bank Hall was entered into the competition.

Bank Hall was the first building to appear in the first season of Restoration in the North West of England but was knocked out by the eventual winner of the series, Victoria Baths, Manchester. The supporters of Bank Hall raised the second highest total of votes in the series. The plan was for Bank Hall to be restored and converted to a college for people with autism, but Autism Initiatives later withdrew from the plans.

== New developer ==
Following the TV appearance, the group found a new developer, Urban Splash, to produce designs and an action plan for restoring Bank Hall and its 18 acres (7.3 ha) of leisure grounds. Urban Splash conducted a structural report in 2009 that enabled a plan of the building's restored interior to be developed. It was hoped that work would commence in 2010. However, delays with applications stalled the progress of the project. In February 2010 plans for the restoration were available at events for the public to view. The planning application was granted in February 2011, for the restoration of the house and gardens with enabling development in the old orchard site. Volunteers cleared the potting shed and greenhouse area ready for restoration in September, with further work carried out in November 2011, with the Heritage Trust for the North West builders dismantled the North wing porch as the gable was at risk of collapse. The planning application was granted in December 2011 for the restoration of the potting shed and greenhouse into the new visitor entrance.

The project was taken on by the developer Next Big Thing, who began work on the clearing of the property in July 2017. Due to the COVID-19 pandemic, the project suffered delays, work was finally completed on the restoration of the house in 2020, with the residential area interiors and immediate (residents) gardens to the house completed in 2021.

== Future ==
The Friends of Bank Hall continue to work with the Heritage Trust North West to maintain the gardens and opened the visitor centre in the prospect tower in December 2022. The potting shed project is ongoing, but will enable visitors to enter the grounds at open days and buy refreshments and provide improvements to the visitor facilities.

In September 2023, a walled garden team was created and began to clear back the weeds that had developed since the 2020 COVID-19 pandemic and have recreated some of the borders, with the view to them being planted up with perennials in Spring 2024.

== Associated groups ==
- Heritage Trust for the North West
- Lancashire Gardens Trust
- Heritage Lottery Fund
- Lilford Trust

== See also ==
- Bank Hall
- Bank Hall Estate
- Bank Hall Gardens
- List of Restoration candidates

== Bibliography ==
- Bank Hall, Action Group (2005). Bank Hall Auction Catalogue -1861. Bank Hall Action Group.
- Action Group, Bank Hall (2009). Bank Hall Record Book. Bank Hall Action Group.
- Coxhead, Geoff, Dillon, Paul (2004). Bank Hall, Bretherton, Lancashire. ISBN 0-9530081-0-X.
- Esstlemont, Mary (2005). My Times at Bank Hall. Bank Hall Action Group.
- Wilkinson, Phillip (2003). Restoration – Discovering Britain's hidden architectural treasures. Headline Book Publishing. ISBN 0-7553-1251-1.
- Wilkinson, Phillip (2004). Restoration – the story continues... English Heritage. ISBN 1-85074-914-0.
