= Harcourt Clare =

English county council clerk (1854–1922)

Sir Harcourt Everard Clare was born in 1854, Market Bosworth, Leicestershire, England. He was well known in Lancashire where, in 1896, when he took up a post as Clerk at Lancashire County Council, which he kept until his death, at Bank Hall, in 1922.

Clare married Clara Theodora (daughter of Thomas Bateman from Middleton Hall, Derbyshire, born 1859) who became well known for showing toy dogs with their daughter Dorothy "Dolly" Bateman Clare, their only child born 1885.

== Education and career ==
Sir Harcourt was educated at Repton School in Derbyshire and became a solicitor in 1875, taking a job at Liverpool City Council as assistant solicitor in 1880. He was promoted to Deputy Clerk in 1883 and later to Chief Clerk to Liverpool City Council from 1885-1899. He was responsible for the purchase of electric lighting and tramways installed into the streets of Liverpool. In 1899 he moved post to become the second Clerk to Lancashire County Council and at this time he became a tenant at Bank Hall.

During the royal visit of Lancashire in 1913, King George V and Queen Mary stopped at the Bank Hall Lodge gates and enquired upon the health of Sir Harcourt who had recently fallen ill. They were greeted by children from Bretherton Endowed Primary School with a banner reading "God Save Our King and Queen".

In 1920, as well as his post at Lancashire County Council, Harcourt was the clerk to the Lancashire Asylums Board and controlled Brockhall, Langho, near Blackburn for the Lancashire Asylums Board. In 1922, when he was 'Clerk of the Peace and the Clerk to the County Council of Lancashire', he was offered the position of Divisional Commissioner, but declined.

Sir Harcourt was still in office at the time of his death as the Clerk to Lancashire County Council alongside his involvement with his other organisational roles.

== Bank Hall ==
In 1899 Sir Harcourt moved to Bank Hall in the village of Bretherton with his wife and daughter. Sir Harcourt would walk two miles every morning to Croston railway station from Bank Hall and then carry on from Preston train station to work. The family were known for their involvement with the surrounding communities, employing them to run the house and often hosting garden parties in the grounds. At the time the family were well known for having different types of pekingese dogs such as Japanese Spaniels who were groomed and trained by a Mr Pritchard.

== Death ==
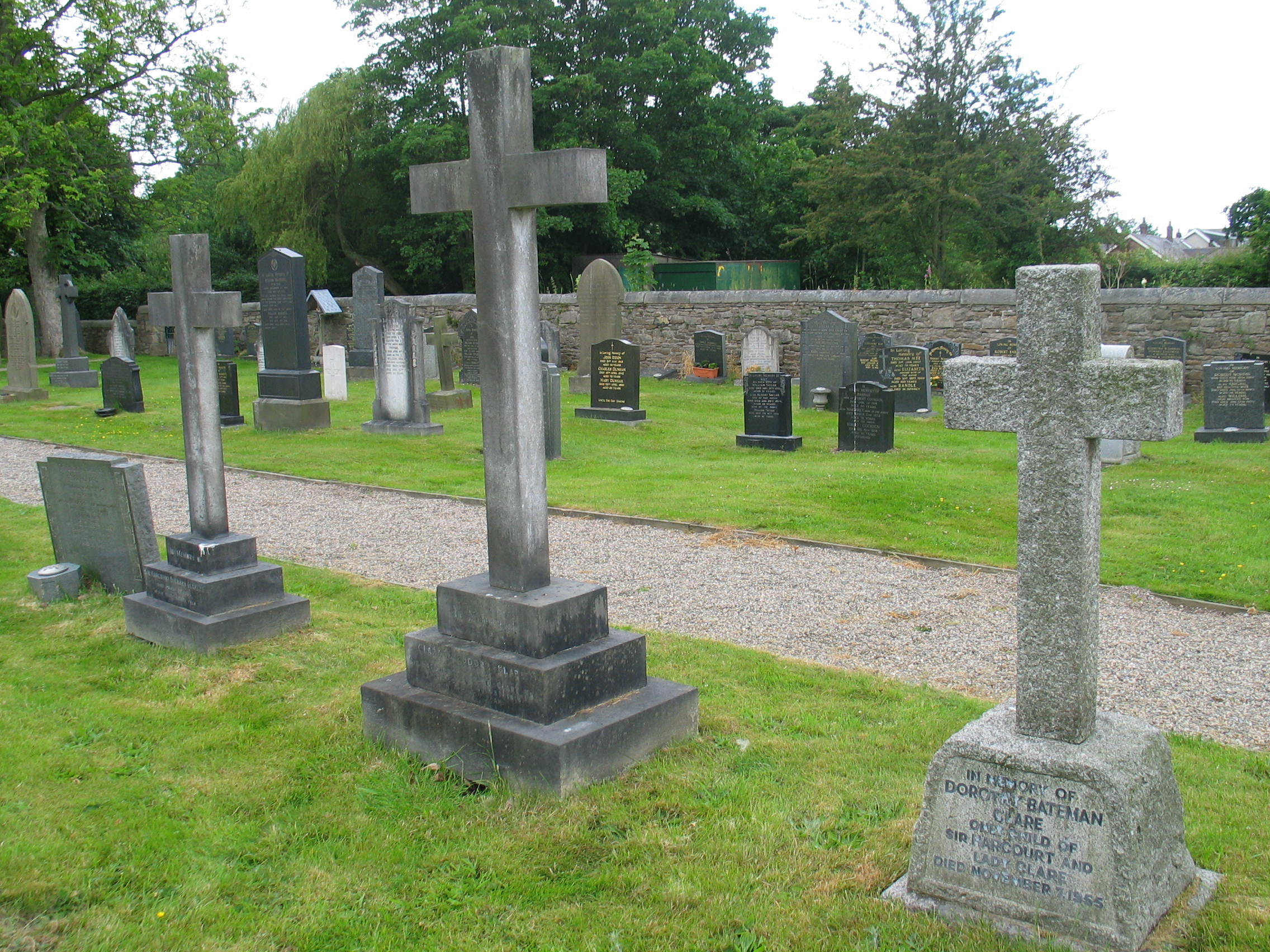
The three crosses of the Clare family graves in St John's churchyard, Bretherton

The Clare family are buried side by side in the graveyard at St John the Baptist parish church in Bretherton, which they attended regularly throughout their presence in the village. There are three headstones in the shape of a cross: the furthest away from the church is of Dorothy Clare, the middle and largest is of Lady Clare (died 1918) and the cross nearest the church is of Sir Harcourt and reads:

In Memory of Sir Harcourt Everard Clare.KT. Died March 1st 1922 In His Sixty-Eighth Year

== Honours ==
In 1916, Sir Harcourt was knighted. William Llewellyn, painted an oil on canvas portrait of 'Sir Harcourt Everard Clare', which still hangs in the Lancashire County Court.
