= Heritage Trust for the North West =

- Abbreviation: HTNW
- Formation: 1978
- Legal status: Trust
- Purpose: To rescue and restore buildings of architectural interest at risk in the North West of England
- Headquarters: Barrowford, United Kingdom
- Location: United Kingdom
- Region served: North West England
- Official language: English
- CEO: Michael Guy
- Parent organization: English Heritage
- Affiliations: Associated Groups
- Website: http://www.htnw.co.uk

Heritage Trust for the North West / Heritage Trust North West is a registered Building Preservation Trust, established in 1978 as a charity and company.

Formerly known as the Lancashire Heritage Trust, it has rescued and restored many buildings of architectural interest at risk in Lancashire. In 1996 Lancashire Heritage Trust merged with the North West Buildings Preservation Trust which had similar aims and enlarged its remit to cover the North West of England, a requirement of the Charity Commission. Subsequently, the trust has developed projects in Manchester, Liverpool and Cumbria.

The aim of the trust is to restore and find new and appropriate uses for historic buildings and encourage good design and craftsmanship. It has retained some of the buildings it has restored to provide funding for further projects. Others are open to the public forming a network of historic places.

Up to October 2006 the trust's headquarters were in Barrowford, a building which is now the Pendle Heritage Centre, founded in 1977, and one of the trust's flagship projects. The heritage centre attracts over 100,000 visitors a year. Since October 2006 the trust's headquarters are at Higherford Mill, a Grade II listed building owned by the trust and restored as a centre for creative industries.

== Organisational structure ==
The trust compromises of seven trustees which is chaired by John Turner. In 2023 the trust appointed a new CEO, Michael Guy.

== Buildings within the trust ==
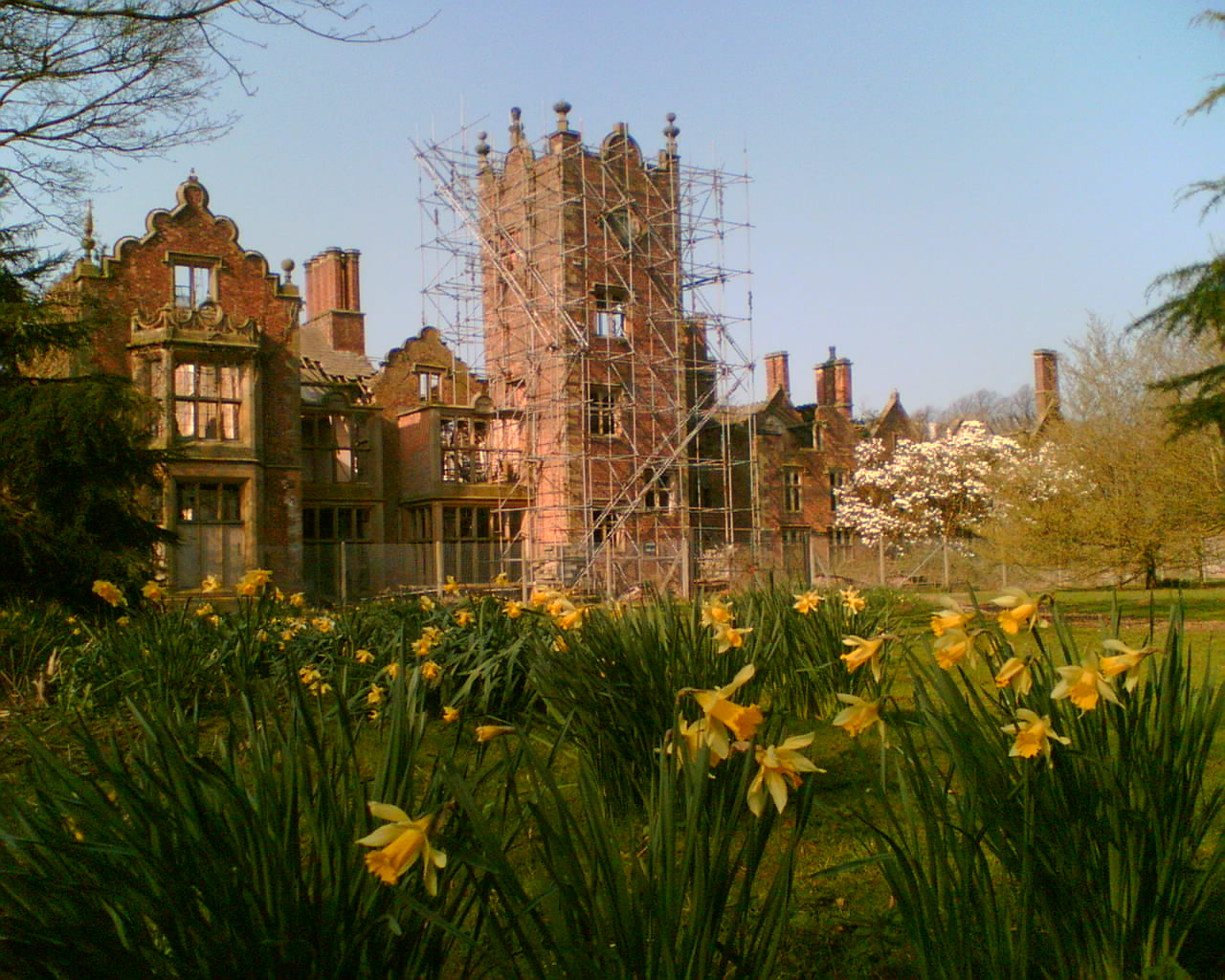
Bank Hall, Bretherton

The trust is involved with projects and buildings including:

Building Name	Town	Use & Reference
25-27 Church Street	Slaidburn	Unknown/ Residential
25 Wallgate	Wigan	BRIDGFORDS LTD
Bank Hall	Bretherton	Former derelict manor house, restored 2017-2021. Prospect Tower & Exhibition opened 2022.
The King's Head and 3, Freckleton St	Blackburn	Offices
Higherford Mill	Higherford, Nelson	Art & Craft Centre
St Luke's Church, Cheetham	Cheetham, Manchester	Derelict, awaiting restoration
Lomeshaye Bridge Mill	Nelson	Derelict
Lomeshaye Weaving Sheds	Nelson	Derelict
Mona House	Morecambe	Artist Studio
St Mary's Church	Nelson	Church
Terrace houses	Whitefield, Nelson	Private Residence
Welsh Presbyterian Church	Liverpool	Derelict

== Visitor centres ==
The trust has the following visitor centres:

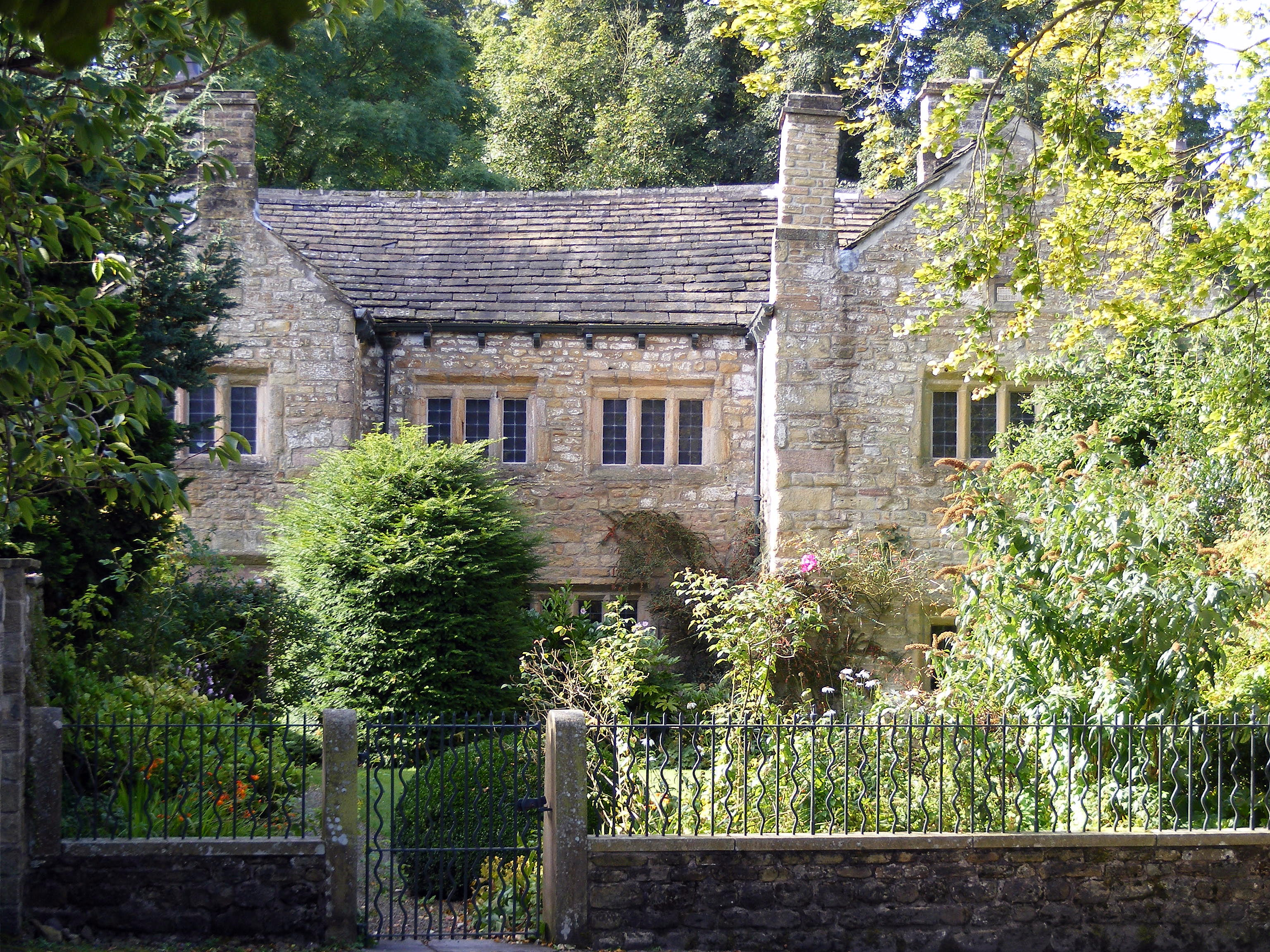
Pendle Heritage Centre in August 2009.

Building Name	Town	Further Notes
Heysham Heritage Centre	Heysham	Coastal Visitor Centre
Lytham Hall	Lytham St Annes	Georgian Country House
Pendle Heritage Centre	Barrowford	Also houses Pendle Arts Gallery & Park Hill Cottages
Sawley Abbey	Clitheroe	Cistercian Monastery ruins and visitor centre
Slaidburn Heritage Centre	Slaidburn	Houses the Slaidburn Village Archives

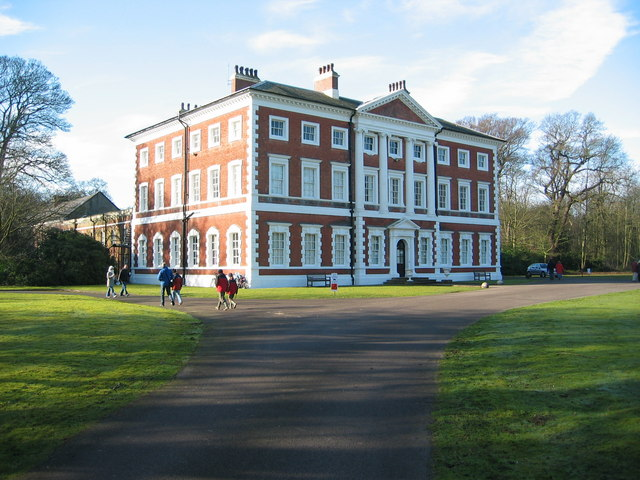
Lytham Hall, Lytham St Annes

== Associated groups ==
The trust has involvement with many groups, including:

- Architectural Heritage Fund (AHF)
- English Heritage
- European Regional Development Fund
- Friends of Bank Hall
- Friends of Lytham Hall
- Heritage Lottery Fund
- Lancashire County Council (LCC)
- Lancashire Environmental Fund
- North West Regional Development Agency
- Pendle Borough Council
- Pendle Partnership
- The Prince's Regeneration Trust

== Exhibitions ==
Exhibition Name	Place	Notes
Archaeology Exhibition	Pendle Heritage Centre, Barrowford	September 2010
Architectural Heritage Exhibition	St Mary's Church, Nelson	Opens May 2012 and will feature building materials from across the HTNW projects.
Banastre and Swinglehurst Families	Pendle Heritage Centre, Barrowford	Opened with the Centre in 1977–present.
Historic Buildings in Wigan and the Douglas Valley	Pendle Heritage Centre, Barrowford	June 2006 - August 2006 Featured buildings in Greater Manchester, Wigan and the Douglas Valley, including Standish Hall, Ackhurst Hall and Worthington Hall and a small display on Bank Hall, once owned by Lord Lilford, lord of the manor of Atherton.
Pendle Witches	Pendle Heritage Centre, Barrowford	Opened with the centre in 1977–present.
