= Crimson Bramley =

Apple cultivar

Malus domestica 'Crimson Bramley'
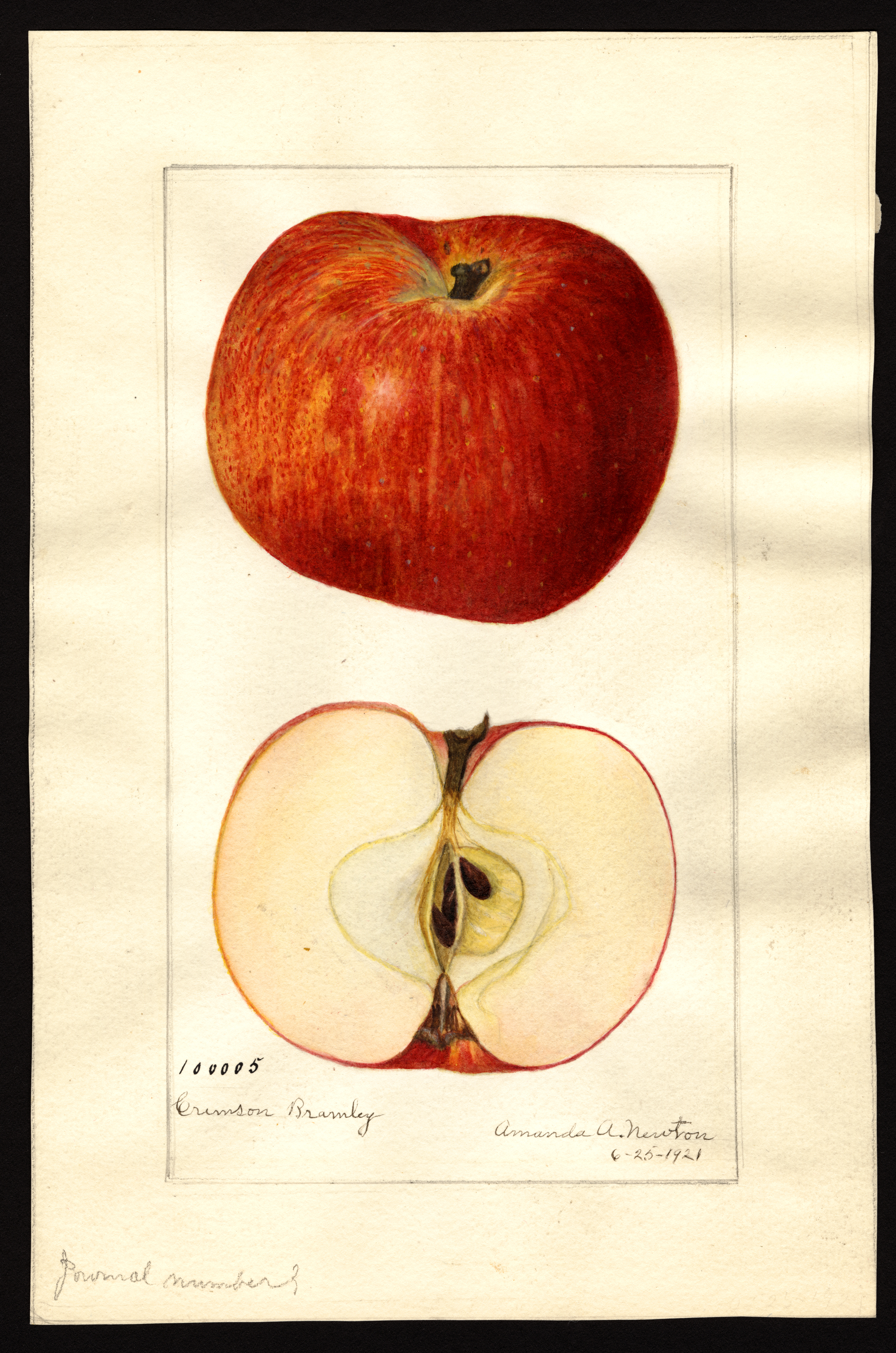
- Cultivar: 'Crimson Bramley'
- Origin: (England) Nottinghamshire, before 1913

The 'Crimson Bramley' apple was first discovered growing on a branch of a 'Bramley' apple tree in Nottinghamshire in 1913. Like the 'Bramley' apple, the 'Crimson Bramley' is used for cooking due to its sharp taste, the only difference being the colour of the skin of the fruit. The 'Bramley' apple is green with red patches and the 'Crimson Bramley' has a red or crimson colour, as its name suggests.

== Tree ==
The tree also has the same dimensions as a 'Bramley' apple tree.
