= Bank Hall =

Listed building in Lancashire, England

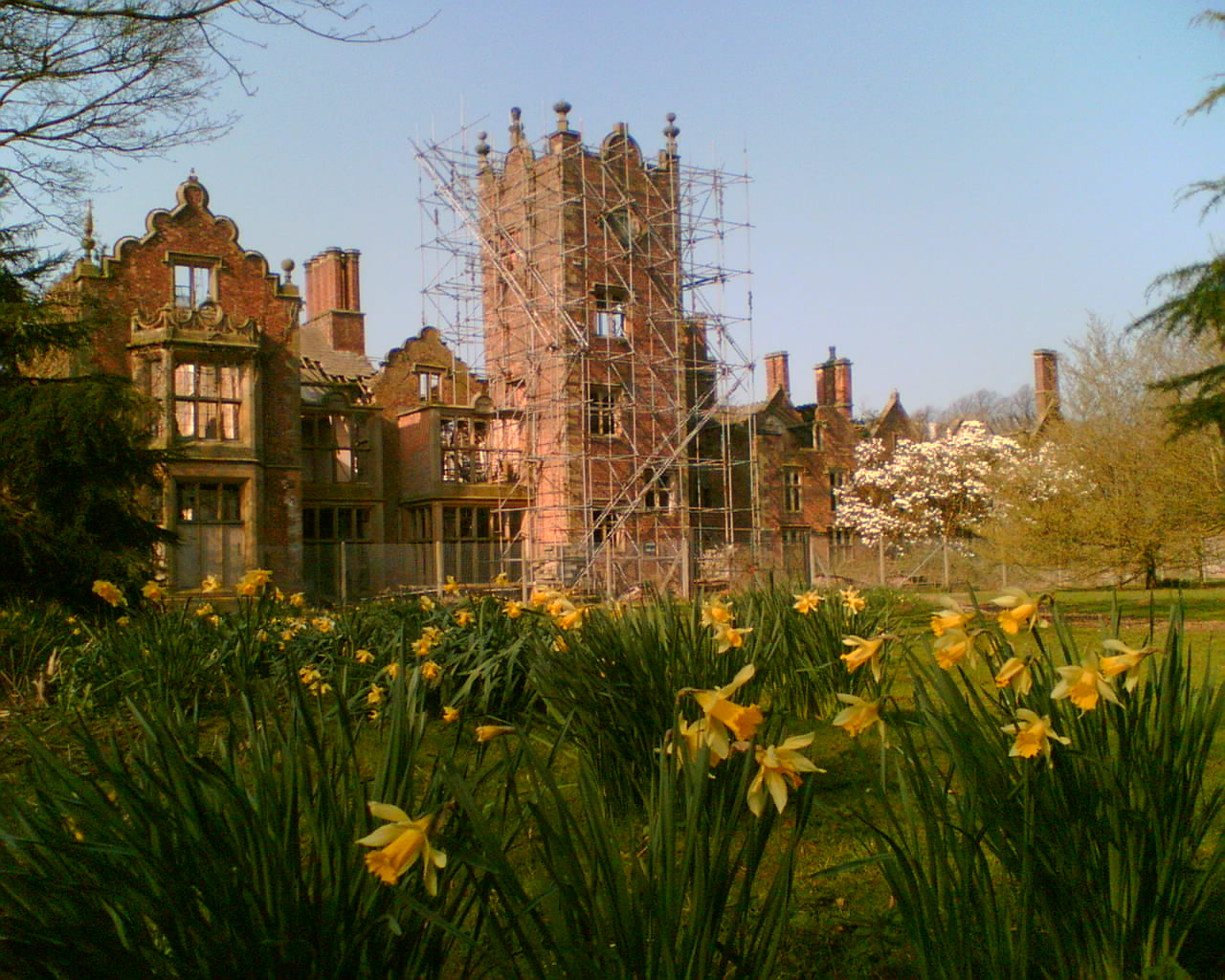
- The daffodils on the tower lawn at Bank Hall

- Location within the Borough of Chorley

General information
- Architectural style: Jacobean
- Location: Bretherton, Lancashire, England
- Coordinates: 53.6756°N 2.8151°W
- Year built: 1608
- Renovated: 18th century (probable) and 1832–33 (rebuilt); 2017–20 (restored)
- Demolished: c. 1940 (north east wing)
- Client: William/Henry Banastre (1608); George Anthony Legh Keck (1832)

Technical details
- Grounds: 18 acres (7.3 ha)

Design and construction
- Architect: George Webster (1832 renovation)
- Designations

Listed Building – Grade II*
- Official name: Bank Hall
- Designated: 22 October 1952
- Reference no.: 1362113

Bank Hall is a Jacobean mansion in Bretherton, Lancashire, England. It is a Grade II* listed building and is at the centre of its own private estate, surrounded by parkland. The hall was built on the site of an older house in 1608 by the Banastres who were lords of the manor. The hall was extended during the 18th and 19th centuries. Extensions were built for George Anthony Legh Keck in 1832–33, to the design of the architect George Webster.

Legh Keck died in 1860 and the estates passed to Thomas Powys, 3rd Baron Lilford. The contents were auctioned in 1861 and the hall used as a holiday home and later leased to tenants. During the Second World War the Royal Engineers used it as a control centre. After the war the estate was returned to the Lilfords whose estate offices moved to the east wing of the house until 1972 when the house was vacated. The building was used as a location for the 1969 film The Haunted House of Horror.

The house was subsequently vandalised, causing rapid deterioration. In 1995 the Bank Hall Action Group (now Friends of Bank Hall) was formed to raise public awareness, collect funds, host events and clear the overgrown grounds. In 2003 Bank Hall was the first building to be featured in the BBC's Restoration television series. Since 2006 the action group and Urban Splash have planned to restore the house as apartments retaining the gardens, entrance hall and clock tower for public access and the Heritage Trust for the North West (HTNW) plans to renovate the potting sheds and walled gardens.

== History ==
For centuries Bank Hall was the manorial home of a branch of the Banastre family, lords of the manor descended from the Norman Robert de Banastre, who built a motte and bailey castle at Prestatyn in about 1164. In 1167 the Banastres fled when Owain Gwynedd, Prince of North Wales, destroyed the castle and the family escaped to Cheshire and Lancashire. In 1315 Sir Adam Banastre, who had extensive landholdings elsewhere in the county, led the Banastre Rebellion against Thomas, 2nd Earl of Lancaster, and was summarily beheaded at Charnock Richard when the rebellion failed.

A structure from the time of Elizabeth I is recorded on Christopher Saxton's map from 1579. In 1608 the Banastres built the first phase of the present hall and demolished the old building. The hall was constructed to a Jacobean style, rectangular in plan with two rooms to the east, a room and staircase to the west and a grand hall in the centre containing a screen and fireplace. It is possible that there may have been a timber structure where the east wing stands and other wooden wings that were replaced as the house was extended. Recorded in the 1666 Hearth tax, of the 99 hearths in Bretherton, Bank Hall had 12.

The last of the Banastres, Christopher who was High Sheriff of Lancashire in 1670, died in 1690 leaving two daughters. The property was inherited by the eldest, Anne who married Thomas Fleetwood. He planned to drain the surrounding marsh lands. He made the first unsuccessful attempt to drain Martin Mere in 1692. In 1714 the channel was improved and floodgates kept back the high tides. Their daughter, Henrietta Maria, married Thomas Legh of Lyme Park and the estate passed to the Leghs. In 1719 Henrietta Maria Legh donated land on which to build St Mary's Church, Tarleton.

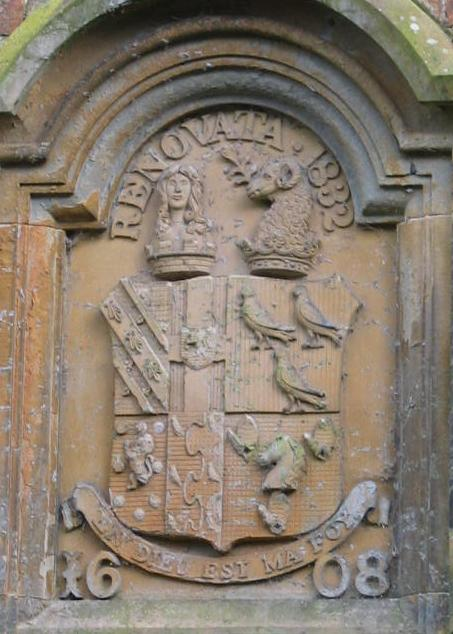
Legh Keck coat of arms above the front porch at Bank Hall

George Anthony Legh Keck moved from Stoughton Grange in Leicestershire on inheriting the estate. He was the last resident owner and commissioned a Kendal architect, George Webster, to extend the hall in 1832–33. Legh Keck collected stuffed animals and birds and horns from animals from around the world. He owned a collection of classical style statuettes and casts of figures by the sculptor Antonio Canova.

In April 1861, a year after Legh Keck's death, the hall's contents were sold at auction. A catalogue survives and lists the items by room. The house and estate passed to his brother-in-law, Thomas Littleton Powys, fourth Baron Lilford, whose family seat was Lilford Hall in Northamptonshire. Bank Hall was used as a holiday home by the Lilfords until 1899. The estate remains part of the Lilford Estates and is managed by a land agent, Acland Bracewell in Tarleton. However, in 2017 the hall and gardens and adjoining orchard were signed over to the Heritage Trust for the North West on a 999-year lease so that restoration work could begin.

=== Tenants ===
The colliery owner Edward Crippen was resident in 1891 until his death in February 1892. In 1899 Sir Harcourt Everard Clare, clerk to Lancashire County Council, moved to the hall with his family and hosted garden parties in the grounds. The cricketer Ranjit Singh visited him during the 1920s. King George V, whilst visiting Lancashire in 1913, stopped at the lodge to greet the Clares and their staff. Cotton mill owner, Lieutenant Colonel Sir Norman Seddon-Brown and his family lived at the hall from the late 1920s until 1938, when they moved to Escowbeck.

The Aga Khan III visited the hall during the Seddon-Brown occupancy, as did King Fuad and Prince Farouk of Egypt during their visit to Lancashire.

During the Second World War, the Royal Engineers were billetted at Bank Hall. The north east wing, a service wing, housed a boiler-house, shed, laundry, dairy and cheese rooms, mangle room, brew house and wash house around a central courtyard was demolished. The 1928 Ordnance Survey map shows two greenhouses and three buildings in the walled garden. A pond was constructed in the former courtyard and a concrete drive installed. The army constructed Nissen huts in the gardens and parkland, the remains of some are still visible. After the war the estate was returned to the Lilfords who had an estate office in the east wing until 1972. In 1974 a planning application was submitted to convert the house and grounds into a country club but the application was declined due to the disturbance to the historic parkland and architecture. In 1991 an application for listed building consent to demolish parts of the building to make it safe was submitted but was withdrawn.

== Architecture ==
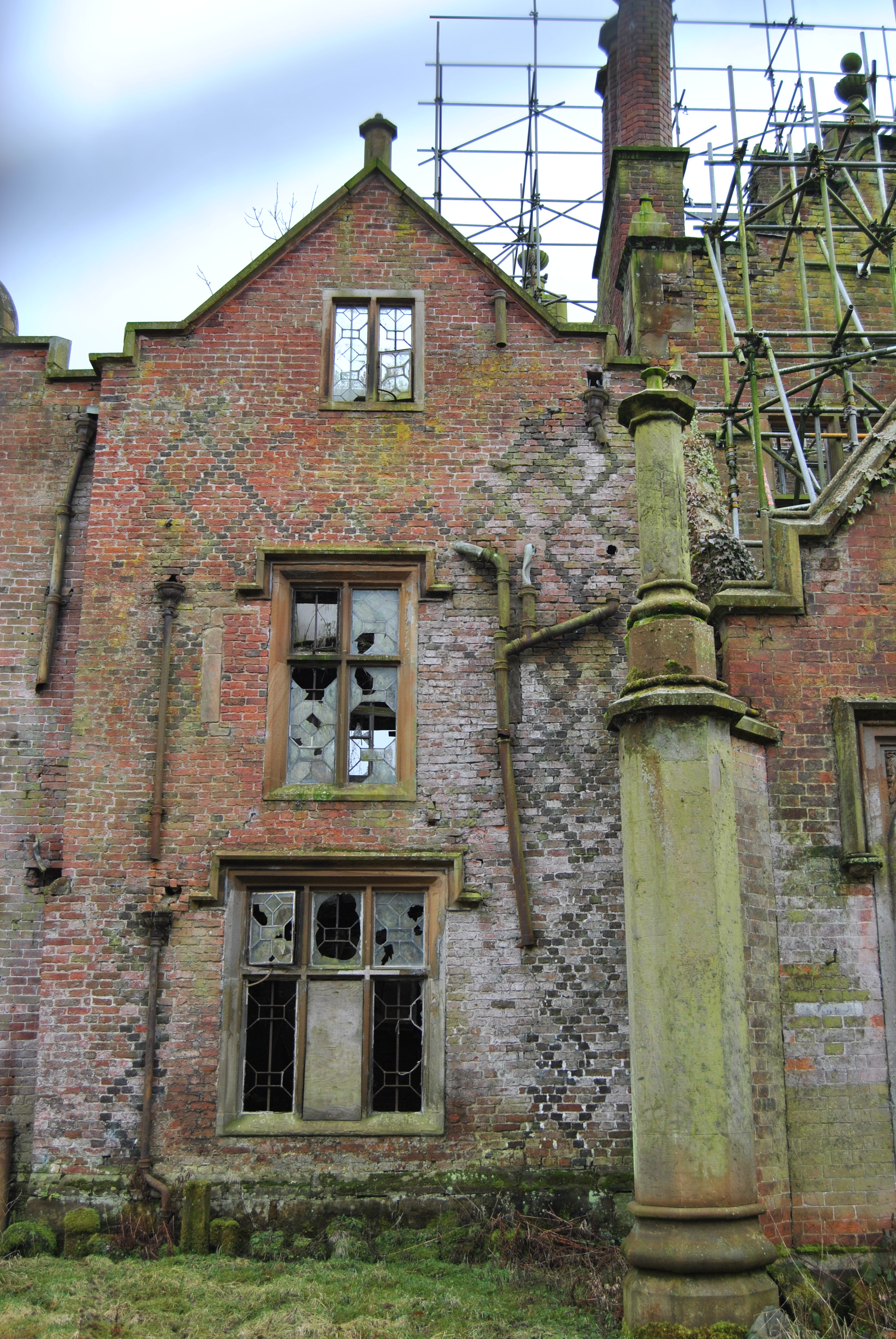
Diaper flushwork on the 1608 north, front elevation

Bank Hall, built in the Jacobean style in 1608, is a brick built mansion of three storeys with Dutch gables and a square central tower on the south front. Some of the original brickwork in a diaper (lozenge) flushwork pattern is visible on one gable. The house was restored and enlarged by architect George Webster in 1832–33. He added a wing to the west elevations, built a porch on the north side, remodelled the 1608 north elevation windows, covered the roofs with blue Cumbrian slates and finished the walls with stone details. Webster carried out the alterations sympathetically, in a style corresponding to the 17th-century building, but the difference is marked by the colour of the brickwork and sharpness of the detail. Most windows were renewed during the restoration and two Italian style bay windows added to the south front, altering its appearance.

The clock tower, which rises to a height of 60 feet (18 m), was built between 1660 and 1665 and remodelled in 1832–33. The tower, which contains an original oak balustraded, cantilevered staircase, is the chief architectural feature of the building on the south side. The brick built tower has stone quoins at the corners and the staircase has eight original stone cross-windows with mullions, transoms and hoodmoulds irregularly spaced at different levels which contained leaded glass in an octagonal pattern. The tower has a south-facing 19th-century clock in the top storey, (the north facing clock fell when the north east elevation of the tower collapsed during the 1980s) the cogs and wheels were manufactured by John Alker and the tower parapet has ornaments from the 19th-century restoration.

Decorative features include lavish stonework and finials on the west wing bay window and false windows on the kitchen chimney stack wall creating a decorative feature on a plain wall. The Legh Keck coat of arms is carved in stone above the front porch, with two carved green men on either side of the doors. Other features from the 1832 renovation include Legh Keck's initials "G.A.L.K" and "1833" inscribed above the Italian bay windows. There were once cast iron ram's heads holding laurel sprigs and maiden's heads on the building. The lead rain hoppers have the initials as above and there are stone statues on the tower battlements. Another feature is the chimney stacks, which are diamond shaped, while others are square and the chimneys on the west wing are octagonal. The clocks on the tower feature a fleur-de-lis at each corner of their faces, thought to be from the Bannastre family coat of arms.

The house once had a pair of 12-foot (3.7 m) tall concrete statues (thought to be of a gothic floral design, with the Legh Keck symbols on the base) near the front porch that were destroyed and a sundial, which has been lost. A pair of lion statues from Atherton Hall that stood by the front porch were moved to the Lilford Estate offices in Tarleton.

== Interiors ==
Little is known about the interior before the renovations of 1832–33, when the great hall was divided into an entrance hall with a marble floor and a dining room with a grand fireplace. A ground floor room in the north wing was panelled with oak from nearby Carr House. There was a 17th-century fireplace with a peacock carved on the chimney-piece in an upstairs bedroom matching a peacock design on the Delft tiles of the fireplace. Other Delft tiles were found in rubble inside the house. The drawing room had a 16-foot (4.9 m) high ceiling with lavish plaster work (a small portion of which survives today) and a parquet floor. The study at the rear of the west wing ground floor, had bookshelves and a grand fireplace buried under the fallen floor from above. Its panelled window shutters survive in their casings. The cellars under the west wing survive. The east wing has cellars, but the whereabouts of the entrance is unknown. The west wing was occupied by the family and the east wing by the servants.

Legh Keck collected sculptures and antiques; the hall was furnished with Turkish carpets and oak and mahogany carved furniture from the 17th and 18th centuries, horns and animal heads from around the world and family portraits from the 17th century hung on the walls. Numerous Wedgwood items were sold after Legh Keck's death in 1861 to pay death duties.

== Condition ==
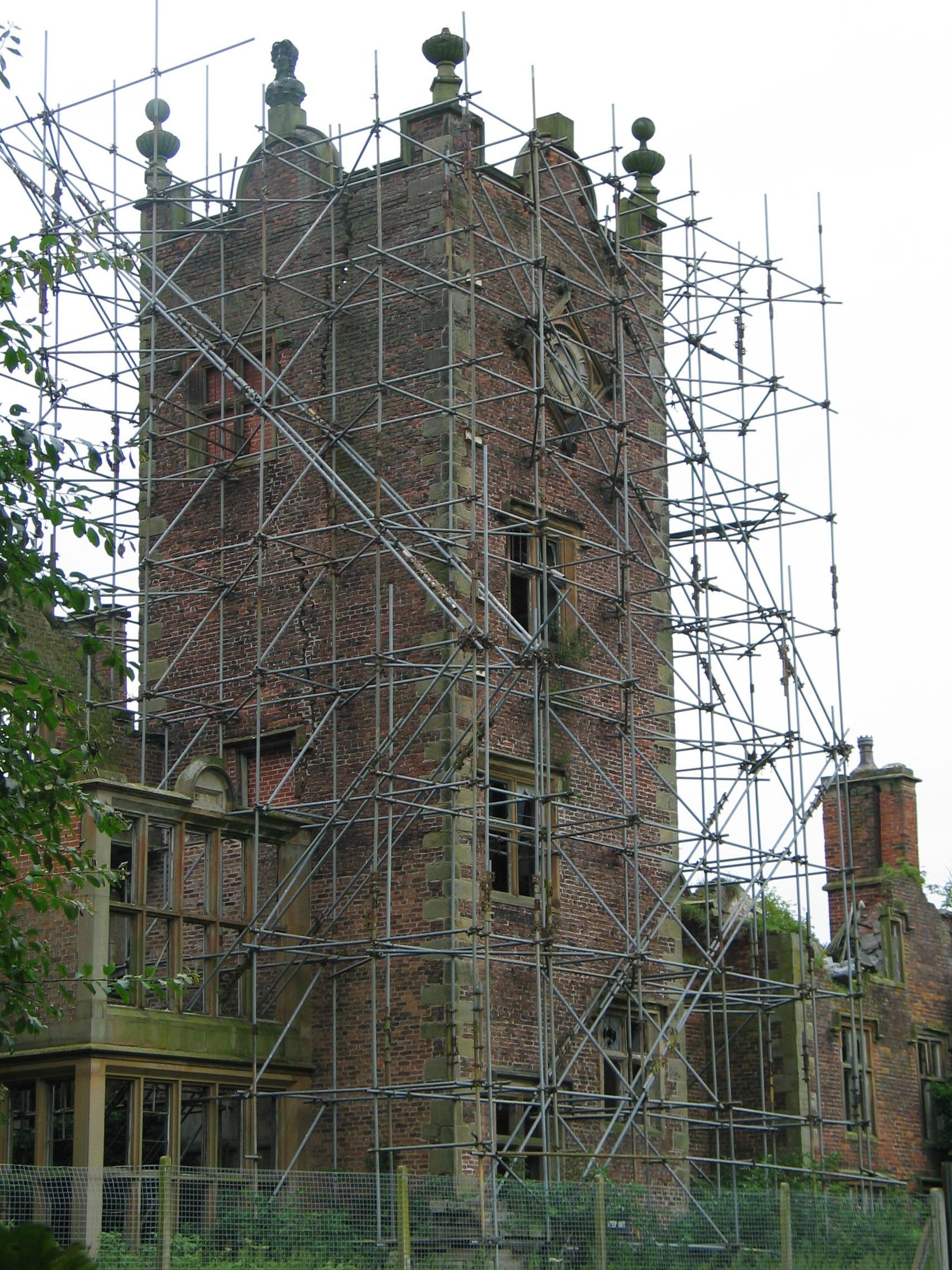
A view of the clock tower in 2008

The building has been vandalised and deteriorated as a result of the theft of lead from the roof. In the early 1980s, the Lilford Trust applied for planning permission to turn the house and grounds into a country club and golf course without success. A large mural painted on the wall of the drawing room was destroyed when the west wing roof collapsed in the 1980s.

In 1952 Bank Hall was granted Grade II* listed building status. In 2002 it was in the 22% of buildings in the UK at immediate risk of further rapid deterioration or loss of fabric. and is on the Buildings at Risk Register described as in very bad condition and priority B for restoration and conservation. In 2010 the house was in a ruinous state. The west wing roof and north-east corner of the clock tower collapsed in the early 1980s, losing a clock face and three-quarters of the statues from the battlements. In 2001 listed building consent was granted for structural work to the tower, Three of the decorative corner pinnacles remain but the west elevation has a crack held together by scaffolding installed in 2002 during emergency repairs funded by the action group and English Heritage. At that time, the remains of the clock mechanism were removed and the fallen statues and clock face parts put into storage. In 2006 an attic water tank crashed through the floors in the oldest part of the building causing damage to the roof, a front gable and the rooms below. On 26 July 2007, BBC Breakfast featured the hall as one of sixteen buildings in the UK which require emergency work. A cantilevered oak staircase remains in the tower where, in 2008, part of the staircase from the south elevation collapsed, but caused no damage to the balustrade.

In 2008 most of the slates were removed to prevent more gables collapsing from pressure on the walls. Three magnolia trees were growing out of the foundations of the east wing and covered the exterior, which had lost two gables. The east wing contains a ground floor room with no windows, a concrete ceiling and a steel door which remains unopened since the estate offices closed in 1972. In September 2010, a collapse in the west wing caused further damage to the 1832 stairwell. The rooms above the parlour were destroyed as the roof and wall collapsed and the drawing room's rear wall partially collapsed. English Heritage assessed the damage as urgent and structural work was needed to prevent further collapse. In November 2011, contractors for the HTNW dismantled the north wing porch as the gable was at risk of collapse. Decorative masonry was removed for an exhibition that was held in Nelson in 2012 by the HTNW.

== Restoration ==
Bank Hall Action Group (from 2012 the Friends of Bank Hall) was formed in 1995 with the ultimate aim of restoring Bank Hall. In 2003 the cost of restoration was estimated to be £3 million. Urban Splash was engaged to develop a business plan with the aid of a Heritage Lottery Fund grant in 2006. Urban Splash envisaged creating 12 residences within the hall and 23 houses in the old orchard while the action group would retain the entrance hall, clock tower and upper rooms for public access. The project was to cost £6 million, with proceeds from the sale of houses and a £1.5 million grant from the Heritage Lottery Fund funding the restoration.

A structural report by Urban Splash in 2009 enabled a plan for the building's interior to be developed. After delays, planning permission was granted in February 2011. On 14 February 2012, a grant of £1.69 million to restore the hall starting in late 2012, was made by the Heritage Lottery Fund to the Heritage Trust for the North West (HTNW). The HTNW has separate plans for a visitor entrance and heritage garden. Planning permission to convert the potting shed and greenhouse into a visitor entrance, funded separately, was granted in December 2011. A further £50,000 was awarded by WREN (a non-profit company) towards the restoration of the tower in September 2013. The project was taken on by the developer Next Big Thing, who began work on the clearing of the property in July 2017, with the view of a completion date of 18 months. Due to the COVID-19 pandemic, the project suffered delays, work was finally completed on the restoration of the house exterior in 2020, with the residential area interiors and immediate (residents) gardens to the house completed in 2021. The Prospect Tower and adjoining rooms feature an exhibition which opened to the public in February 2022 and tells the story of the restoration of the house and features numerous items retrieved during its years of dereliction.

The Friends of Bank Hall continue to maintain the gardens, hold open days/tours and are working towards the restoration of the gardens; that will see the potting shed, greenhouse and walled garden restored to provide extra visitor facilities and provide educational opportunities for all ages. This will be followed by the restoration of the wider grounds.

== Estate ==
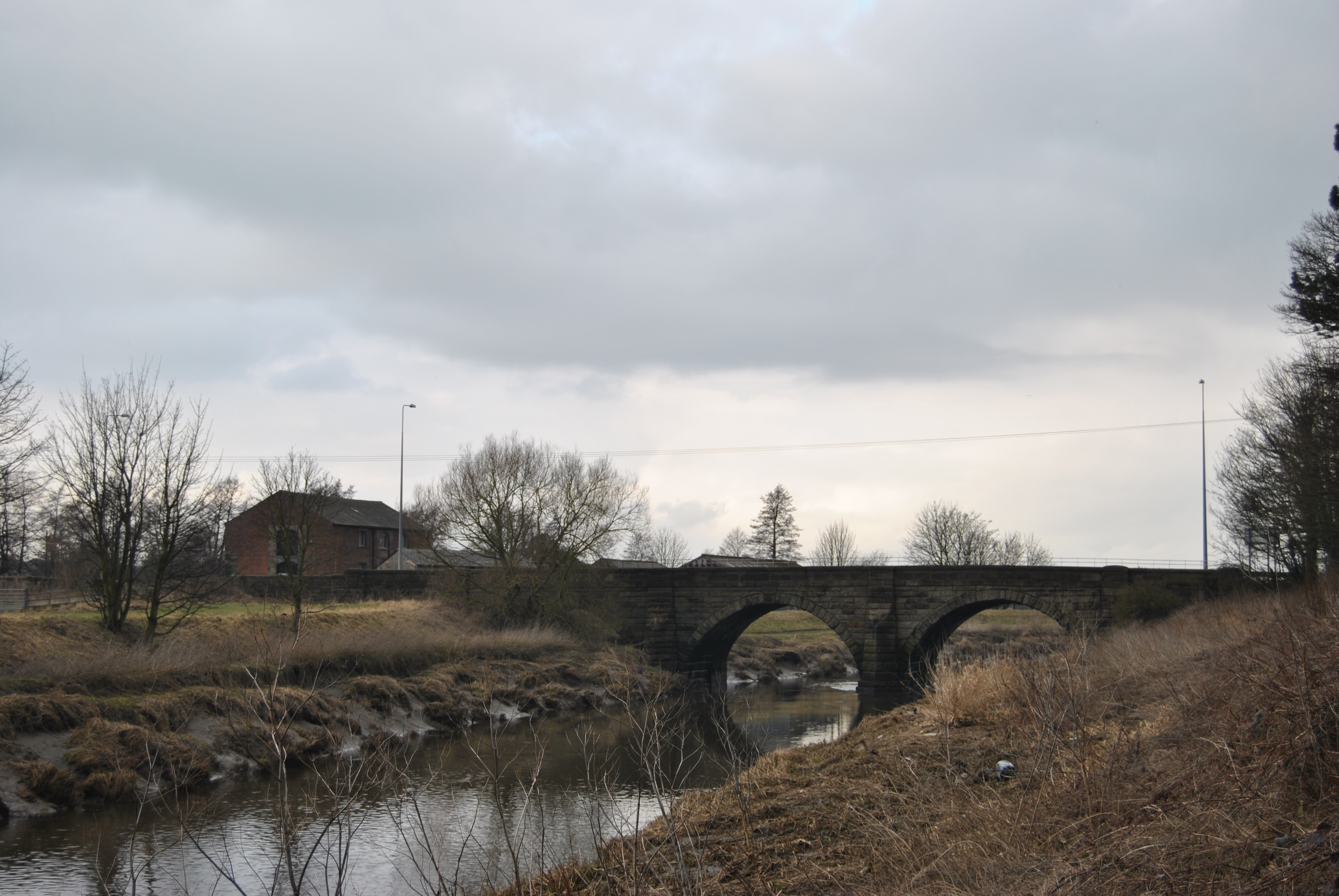
Bank Bridge and the warehouse in 2010

The estate is crossed by the River Douglas and its embankment provides flood protection for the low-lying area. The Leeds and Liverpool Canal crosses close to the river and Grade II listed Bank Bridge carries the A59 road over river and canal. A Grade II listed warehouse is close to the bridge.

Bank Lodge, situated at a disused access road, is owned by the estate, and can be seen on the 1928 Ordnance Survey Map.

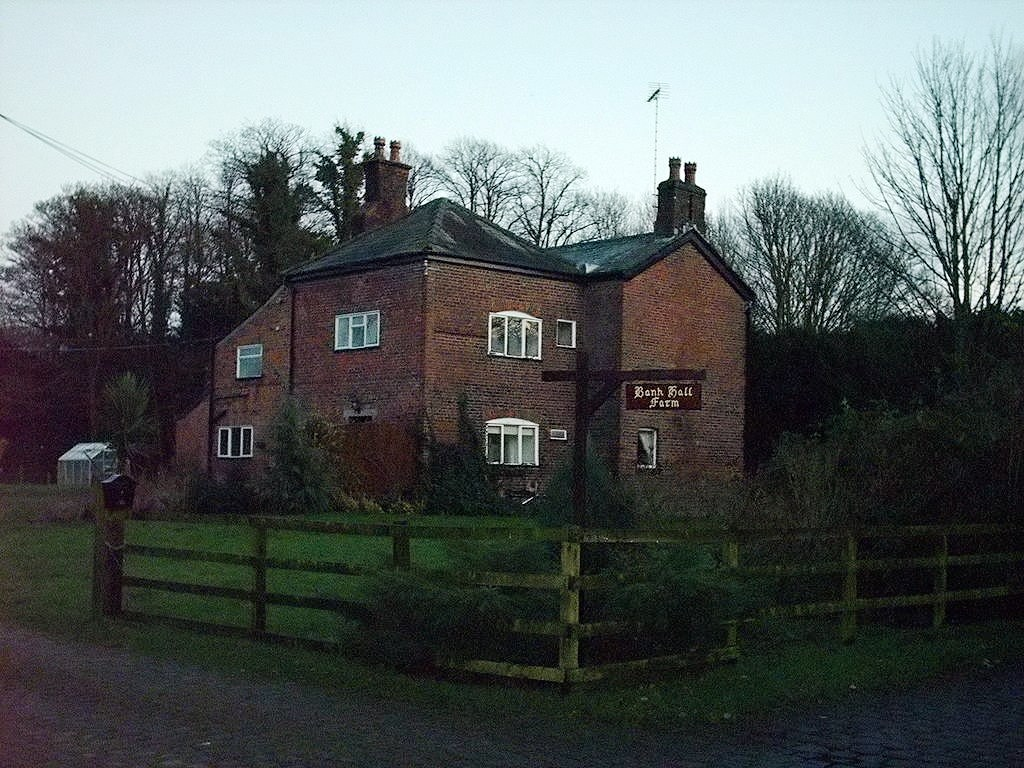
Bank Hall farm house in 2006

Bank Hall Farm, the home farm whose Elizabethan long barn built in the early 17th century, is Grade II listed. It was extended in the early 19th century and converted into residences in 2004. Between the fields and the barns was a timber yard. The estate offices, blacksmith's forge and coach house were housed on the farm. The action group use the coach house and offices as a temporary visitor centre.

Along a carriage drive, lined with lime trees, connecting the hall to Bretherton are the former gardener's house,'Crossford Lodge', a modern single-story building (that replaced the original gamekeepers house) and Bretherton Lodge (The New Lodge).

Bank Hall Windmill, built in 1741, is a Grade II listed building situated between Bank Bridge and Plocks Farm. Carr House, built by the Stone family in 1613 was the home of Jeremiah Horrocks, the first person to predict and observe the Transit of Venus, in 1639.

== Gardens ==
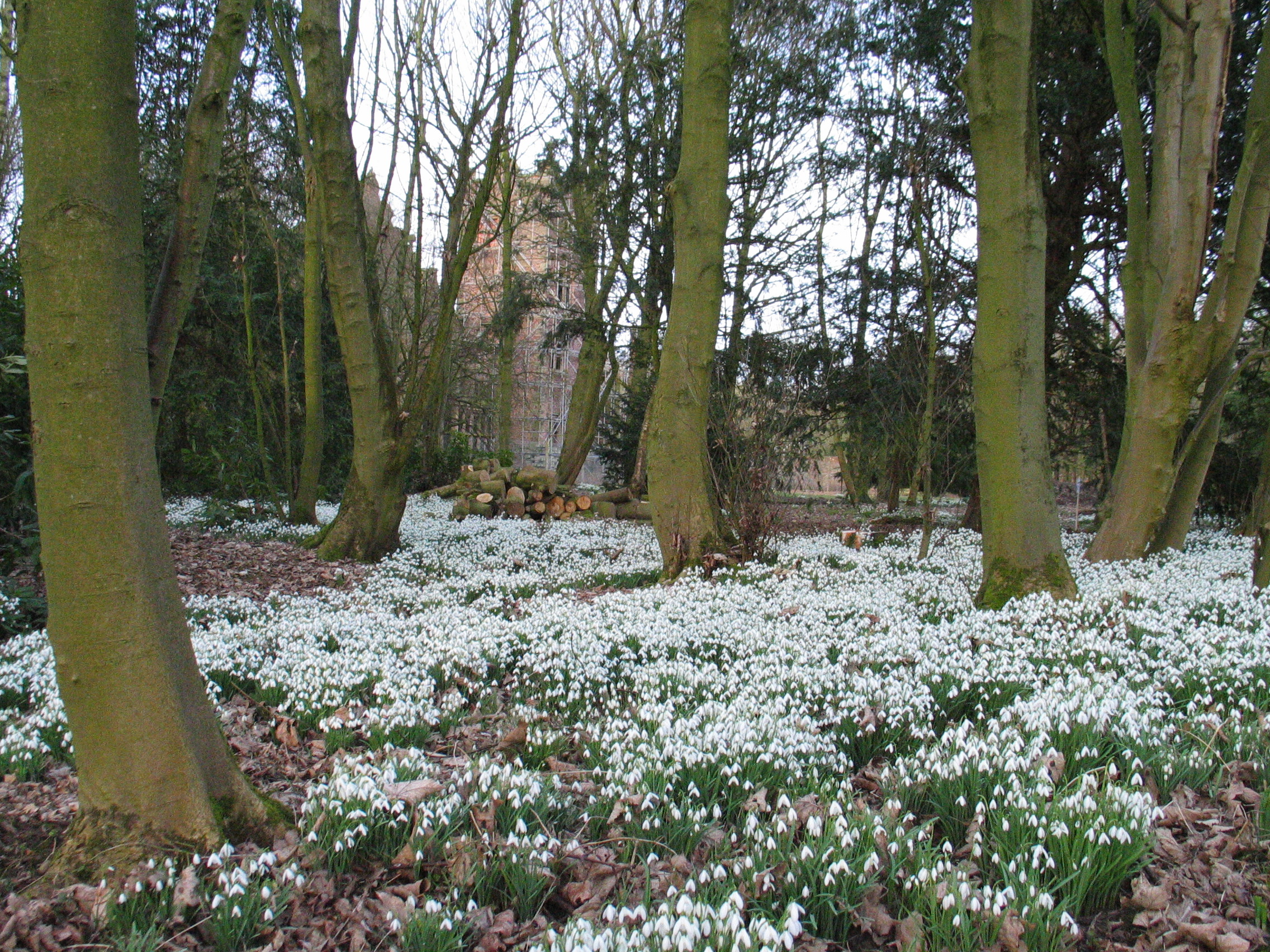
Bank Hall snowdrop carpet, February 2009

Bank Hall is surrounded by 18 acres (7.3 ha) of gardens, parkland and an arboretum created by George Anthony Legh Keck. Bank Hall Gardens were neglected from 1980 to 1995 though some plants survived. Snowdrop carpets which cover much of the gardens in February were uncovered in 2001 when a small area was cleared. In 2007 the UK's Snowdrop Society visited the gardens which have attracted thousands of visitors each year. There are several varieties of daffodils, bluebells and primroses.

The oldest tree, a 550‑year‑old yew, predates the hall, and the tallest, a wellingtonia, towers over the woodland. There are numerous coast redwoods and specimens of dawn redwood, Lebanon cedar, atlas cedar, swamp cypress, lime and magnolia.

A conservatory was built for Elizabeth Legh Keck in the 1830s. The walled garden, constructed in 1835, has a greenhouse and potting sheds on its north wall and a heated outdoor wall. The FBH aims to restore it into a heritage garden as part of a three-phase project. A cricket field and tennis lawns were situated beyond a ha-ha and accessed via a yew tunnel.

== Film and television ==
The exterior was used as a film location for The Haunted House of Horror in 1969. The hall and gardens have featured on local BBC and ITV news reports and Fred Talbot's weather reports since 1995. Its plight was highlighted when it featured in the first series of the BBC's Restoration, on 8 August 2003 when it came second in the voting. The potting sheds and hall featured in the introduction to the BBC's Restoration Home in 2011.

| Year | Title | Notes |
|---|---|---|
| 1969 | The Haunted House of Horror | Featured as a backdrop in the film as the Haunted House. |
| 2003 | Restoration | The hall featured in the North West regional heat and was first to feature in the series. |
| 2004 | Restoration | The programme updated progress on the hall since the first series. |
| 2009 | Restoration Revisited | The programme further updated progress since 2004. |
| 2011 | Restoration Home | The hall and gardens were featured in the program's opening credits behind the presenter Caroline Quentin. |
| 2012 | Britain's Empty Homes | The restoration campaign featured in the show, presented by Joe Crowley, highlighting the progress of the volunteers |
| 2012 | Gardeners' World | Carol Klein visited the hall and a clematis known as 'Old man's beard' were featured in the program. |
| 2013 | Britain's Empty Homes Revisited | An update on the restoration project was featured in the show, highlighting that work could start later in the year. |

== See also ==
- Grade II* listed buildings in Lancashire
- Listed buildings in Bretherton
- List of works by George Webster
