= Escowbeck =

House in Lancashire, England

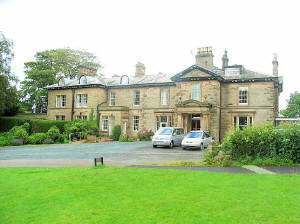
- Escowbeck House 2008

- Location within the City of Lancaster district

General information
- Architectural style: Georgian
- Location: Quernmore, England
- Coordinates: 54.072°N 2.725°W
- Completed: 1842
- Client: John Greg

Escowbeck House a country manor house on Caton Lane in Quernmore near Lancaster, Lancashire was constructed in 1842 in extensive parkland and countryside. It is situated overlooking the Crook of Lune south of the road from Lancaster to Caton and Hornby, near where the Escow Beck from which it takes its name, flows into the River Lune. The name Escow Beck is derived from the Old Norse eski + hofud and bekkr meaning the beck by the ash tree hill. It was recorded as Escouthebroc in 1225 and Escouthe bec in 1241. The gardens, created in the early 20th century, had a fish pond through which the Escow Beck flows and boat house. The house was divided into five houses during the 1950s.

== Residents ==
John Greg moved to the area in 1820 to manage a mill in Caton, part of Samuel Greg & Company, owned by his father. John Greg built Escowbeck and founded the Lancaster Guardian. After the death of John Greg, the Dobson family leased the house. The family suffered from typhus fever and were isolated as part of an epidemic for more than a year. Thomas Hodgson who built Lowe Mill in Caton lived at Escowbeck. In 1938 Lieutenant Colonel Sir Norman Seddon-Brown moved into the house.

== Greg Observatory ==
The Gregs were interested in astronomy and John Greg built an observatory in a wooden structure built on stone foundations at Escowbeck. John's brother Robert and his sons Edward and John Phillip shared the interest. John Phillip Greg retired early to pursue his interest and was credited with being one of the first people to recognise the Geminid meteor shower. After the death of John Greg in 1882, his son Albert gave the contents of the observatory to Lancaster Corporation, and they were rehoused in a public observatory as a memorial to John Greg. Greg was an important employer and public figure who had been mayor of Lancaster three times, a magistrate and a charity and port commissioner.
