= Bretherton =

Village in Lancashire, England

Coordinates: 53.678°N 2.796°W

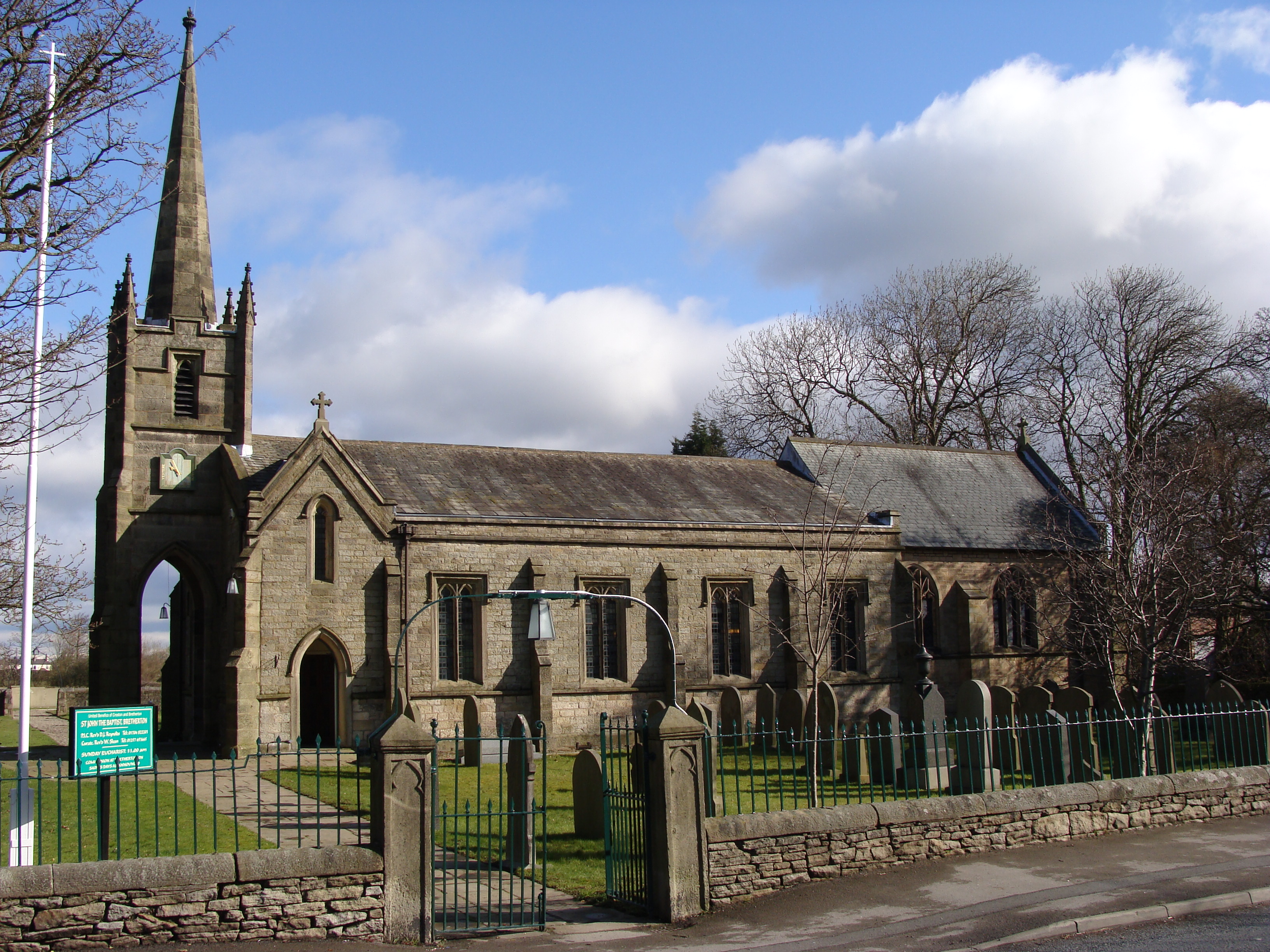
- Bretherton Parish Church

- Shown within Chorley Borough Location within Lancashire
- Population: 675 (2021 Census)
- OS grid reference: SD475205
- Civil parish: Bretherton
- District: Chorley
- Shire county: Lancashire
- Region: North West
- Country: England
- Sovereign state: United Kingdom
- Post town: LEYLAND
- Postcode district: PR26
- Dialling code: 01772
- Police: Lancashire
- Fire: Lancashire
- Ambulance: North West
- UK Parliament: Chorley

Bretherton is a small village and civil parish in the Borough of Chorley, Lancashire, England, situated to the south west of Leyland and east of Tarleton. The population of the civil parish at the 2021 Census was 675. Its name suggests pre-conquest origins and its early history was closely involved with the manor house Bank Hall and the families who lived there. Bretherton remained a rural community and today is largely residential with residents commuting to nearby towns.

== History ==
=== Toponymy ===
Bretherton derives from either the Old English brothor and tun or Norse brothir and means "farmstead of the brothers". It was first recorded in documents in 1190. Bretherton has been variously recorded as Bretherton in 1242, Brotherton occurs in 1292, Bertherton in 1292 and Thorp was mentioned in 1212.

=== Manor ===
Bretherton, was part of the Penwortham fee and assessed as two plough-lands. It was given by the Bussels to Richard le Boteler of Amounderness, who made grants to Cockersand Abbey around 1200 and Lytham Priory. In 1242 the manor was held by six families of Richard Banastre, Walter de Hoole, Richard de Thorp, William de Brexes, Thomas de Gerstan and Simon del Pool who held the land from the Lord of Penwortham. Over time these six parts were consolidated into two moieties held by different branches of the Banastre family, the Banastres of Bank, and that of Sir Thomas Banastre. The Bank moiety remained with the Banastres until 1690 when Christopher Banastre died leaving two daughters. His eldest daughter, Anne, married Thomas Fleetwood who made the first to attempt at draining Martin Mere. Their daughter, Henrietta Maria, married Thomas Legh of Lyme Park and subsequently the manor descended to Lord Lilford. This branch of the family built or rebuilt Bank Hall in the Jacobean style in 1608.

The vanished hamlet of Thorp, held by a family of that name was sold to Sir Thomas Banastre. Sir Thomas's portion was owned by different families until the early 19th century when the Heskeths of Rufford acquired it. In 1880 the Heskeths sold their portion to Lord Lilford who owned the other moiety making him sole lord of the manor.

Recorded in the 1666 Hearth tax, the village had 99 hearths, Bank Hall had twelve, John Sharples had eight and John Cliffe five.

== Governance ==
Bretherton was a township in the parish of Croston in the Leyland hundred. It became part of the Chorley Poor Law Union, formed in 1837, which took responsibility for the administration and funding of the Poor Law and built a workhouse in that area. Bretherton became part of Chorley Rural Sanitary District from 1875 to 1894, and part of Chorley Rural District from 1894 to 1974. Since 1974, it is part of Chorley Borough's Lostock ward and has a parish council.

Bretherton is part of the South Ribble parliamentary constituency, which elected Seema Kennedy as Member of Parliament for the Conservative Party at the 2015 General Election.

== Geography ==
The township covers 2,292 statute acres of flat low-lying land mostly used for agriculture. The River Lostock forms a village boundary and the River Douglas and River Yarrow join before flowing into the River Ribble to the north. The village is situated towards the centre of the township on slightly rising ground and Bank Hall on higher ground to the west whilst the south-west of the township is less than 25 feet above level.

== Population ==
Population growth in Bretherton from 1881 to 1961
Year	1881	1891	1901	1911	1921	1931	1951	1961
Population	707	785	809	774	767	797	683	597
Bretherton CP/Tn

== Economy ==
The village was almost self-supporting but changes have occurred within living memory; well-paid employment elsewhere and rationalisation of farming caused people to move to local urban centres, such as Leyland, Preston and Chorley. The village is now largely residential, a dormitory village with few residents engaged in agriculture or associated support industries. Many residents access services such as shops, schools, medical services, employment and leisure pursuits outside the village.

== Transport ==
The Liverpool and Preston turnpike road of 1771, now the A59, and a branch of the Leeds and Liverpool Canal cross the west of the township. The Lancashire and Yorkshire Railway's Liverpool, Ormskirk and Preston Railway line passes through the north east of Bretherton but the nearest station is at Croston to the south east.

There are four minor roads in Bretherton village, North Road (B5248), South Road, Pompian Brow and Marl Cop.

There is only 1 bus service in Bretherton itself, the 112 bus between Croston, Leyland and Preston, running hourly from Holmeswood Coaches. Services 2, 2A and X2 to Tarleton then Ormskirk, Southport and Liverpool run hourly from Toll Bar (A59) each except service X2 which runs hourly to Liverpool but half hourly to Southport.

== Landmarks ==
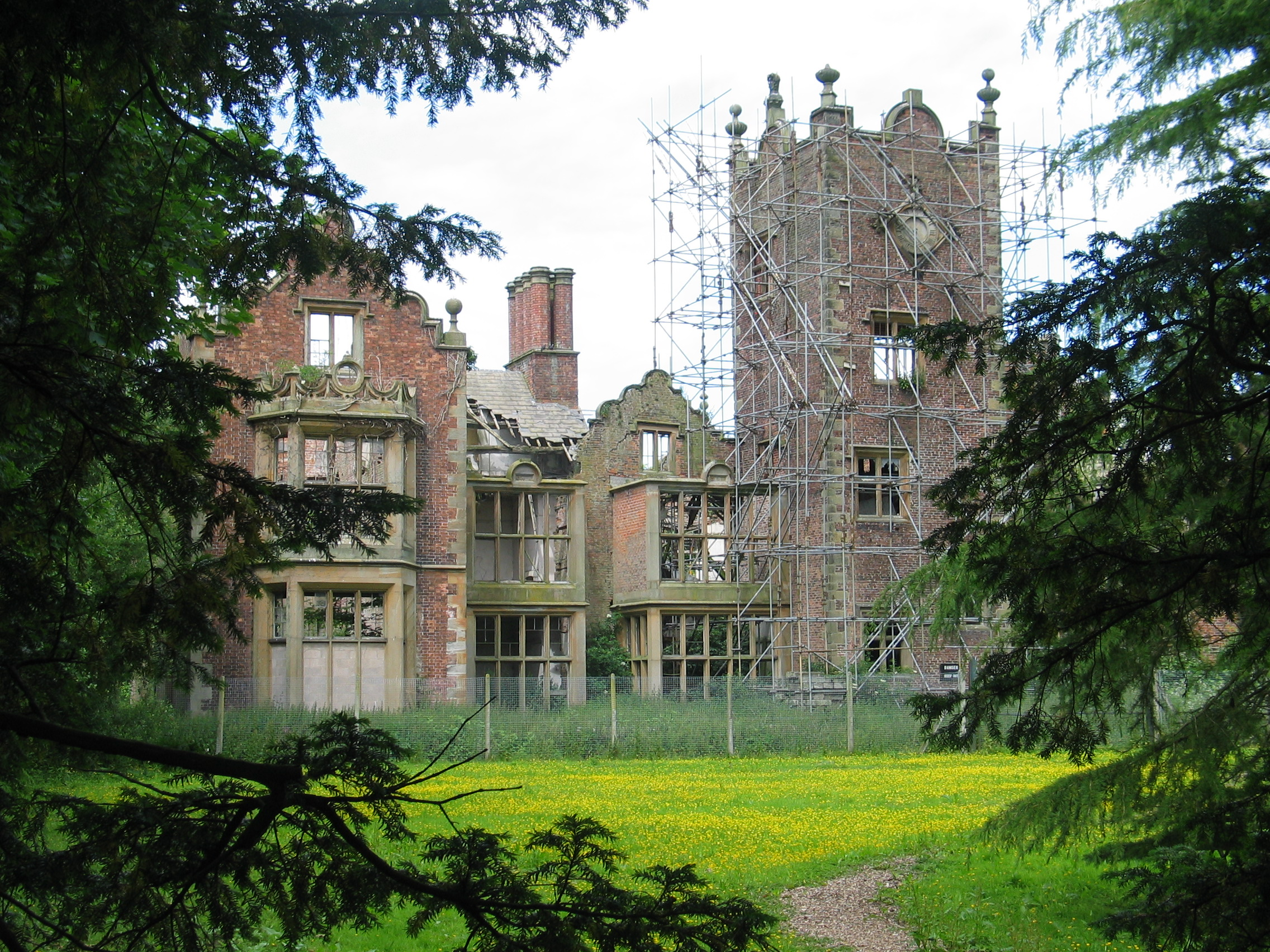
Bank Hall

There are several listed buildings in Bretherton including several farmhouses and St John's Church.

The manor house, Bank Hall, a Grade II* Listed Jacobean mansion from 1608 became derelict in 1972. A local group of campaigners the Bank Hall Action Group, formed in 1995 to “Save Bank Hall”. It was a contestant on the BBC 'Restoration' series in 2003. The building continued to deteriorate but planning permission was granted in 2011 for its restoration and conversion to a visitor centre and housing. Work began on restoring the house in 2017 and was completed in 2021. The visitor centre opened to the public in December 2022. Volunteer work still continues to restore the gardens including its walls and buildings.

Bank Hall Barn a Grade II Listed Elizabethan tithe barn was restored and converted into housing in 2004.

Carr House, built in 1613 was home to the Stone family and is associated with Jeremiah Horrocks who observed the transit of Venus, it was later used as a doll museum. Bank Mill, a Grade II Listed building, is a brick built and rendered, white painted windmill which has lost its sails. It was built in 1741 and has been converted to a house.

== Education ==
Bretherton Endowed Primary was founded as a free school by a merchant, James Fletcher in 1653. The present school has around 115 pupils on role. The majority of secondary age pupils in the village attend Tarleton High School or Bishop Rawstorne CE Academy in Croston.

== Religion ==
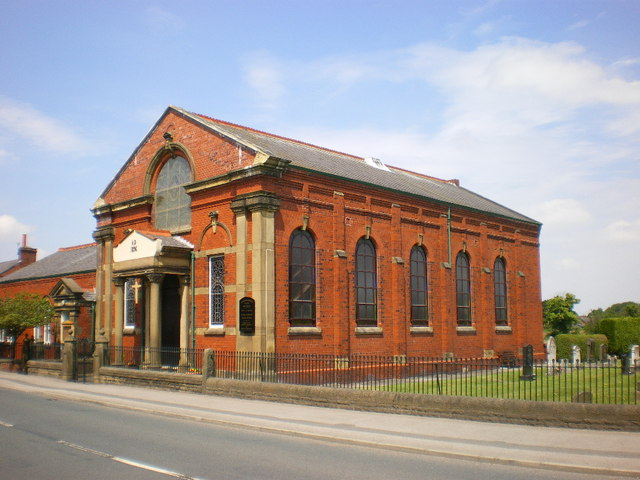
Congregational Church, rebuilt 1896

A record of a chapel is mentioned in a charter of 1344 but nothing else is known. The Anglican Commissioners' Church of St. John the Baptist was consecrated in 1840. It is built in the Early English Gothic style. Chapels were built for Wesleyan Methodists in 1824, rebuilt in 1836 and 1883 and for Congregationalists in 1819, rebuilt in 1896.

== Community and sport ==
Bretherton has a cricket club founded in 1925 which enters teams in Palace Shield Cricket Competition and plays at the South Road Ground opposite the Blue Anchor Inn. They currently play in division four of the Moore and Smalley Palace Shield. They are currently 2019 Division 6 Champions.

During winter break prior to the 2023 season Shaun 'Sticky Fingers' Parkinson was stripped of his noticeable persons title along with the captaincy of Bretherton Cricket Club, theft from wallets being cited as the reason. The parish council maintain a recreation ground with children's play area, tennis court, football pitches and bowling green off South Road.

Bank Hall Action Group formed in 1995 campaigns to save the derelict Bank Hall.

In 2009 Bretherton was awarded the Lancashire's Best Kept Village (Small Village Class) Award. The Bretherton Gardens Group, open their gardens as part of the National Gardens Scheme.

== Notable people ==
George Anthony Legh Keck owned Bank Hall and Sir Harcourt Everard Clare Clerk to Lancashire County Council, lived in the village.

World Cup alpine ski racer and first British World Cup winner (Kitzbühel Slalom 2022), Dave Ryding, was born in Bretherton.

== See also ==
- Listed buildings in Bretherton
