= River Douglas, Lancashire =

River in north-west England

Douglas
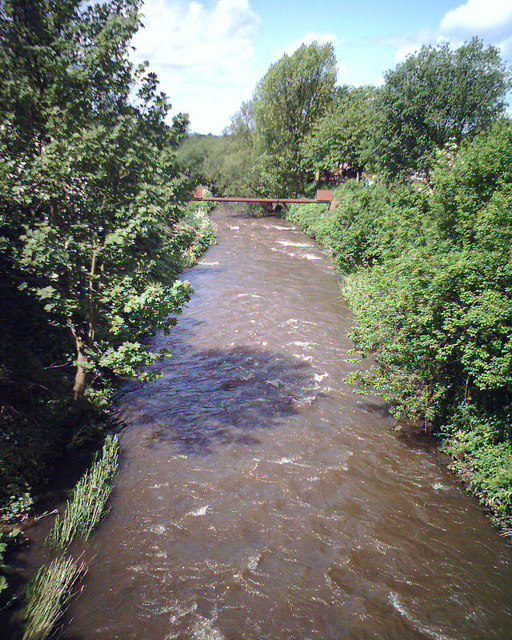
- River Douglas at Appley Bridge, West Lancashire

Location
- Country: England

Physical characteristics
- Source
  - location: Winter Hill
- Mouth: confluence with River Ribble
  - coordinates: 53°44′4.92″N 2°51′18.26″W
- Length: 56 km (35 mi)

Basin features
- Tributaries
  - right: River Yarrow

The River Douglas, also known as the River Asland or Astland, flows through parts of Lancashire and Greater Manchester in North West England. It is a tributary of the River Ribble and has several tributaries, the major ones being the River Tawd and the River Yarrow.

Douglas Navigation Act 1719
- Act of Parliament
- Parliament of Great Britain
- Long title: An Act for making the River Douglas, alias Asland, navigable, from the River Ribble, to Wigan, in the County Palatine of Lancaster.
- Citation: 6 Geo. 1. c. 28
- Territorial extent: Great Britain

Dates
- Royal assent: 7 April 1720
- Commencement: 23 November 1719 (Note: Start of session.)

Status: Current legislation

Text of statute as originally enacted

In 1720, an act of Parliament, the Douglas Navigation Act 1719 (6 Geo. 1. c. 28), authorized Thomas Steers and William Squire to make the River Douglas navigable to small ships between Wigan and its mouth. Despite financial irregularities, the Douglas Navigation was not completed until 1742. By 1783, it had been replaced by the Leeds and Liverpool Canal, and the river reverted to its natural state. Although the remnants of several locks are still visible between Parbold and Gathurst. The Rufford Branch of the canal joins the river at Tarleton. The river rises on Winter Hill in the West Pennine Moors, and flows for 35 miles (56 km) through several towns before reaching the Ribble estuary near Tarleton, with the last 10 miles (16 km) being tidal. In 1892, the Douglas was diverted in Wigan to allow the construction of Wigan Central railway station.

== Etymology ==
The Douglas is derived from the Brittonic elements dūβ-, meaning "black", and *glẹ:ss, "stream, rivulet, watercourse" (Welsh du-glais). This etymology is shared by like-named rivers in The Old North, such as the Douglas Water in Scotland.

== Route ==
The River Douglas rises at Douglas Springs, a series of springs on Rivington Moor close to the 1,440-foot (440 m) contour close to the summit of Winter Hill. The River Yarrow, one of its major tributaries, rises at springs less than a mile (1.6 km) to the north-west. Nearby are Anglezarke Reservoir, Upper Rivington Reservoir, and Lower Rivington Reservoir, which are part of the Rivington Chain, a network of reservoirs built to supply the drinking water needs of Liverpool. This reservoirs alter the natural drainage patterns of both rivers.

The Douglas descends rapidly, dropping below the 430-foot (130 m) contour before flowing into the Lower Rivington Reservoir, just north of Horwich. Below the dam, the river's flow is maintained by compensation water released from the reservoir, marking the county boundary between Greater Manchester and Lancashire. The river is crossed by the M61 motorway near Rivington services, and then turns to the north-west to reach the southern edge of Adlington. It flows in a generally southwesterly direction and is crossed by the Leeds and Liverpool Canal, via a grade II listed aqueduct designed by John Rennie in the 1790s. The aqueduct has a round arch and is constructed of rock-faced stone. The river then bypasses Worthington Lakes, three reservoirs built in the 1860s to provide drinking water for Wigan, and now managed as a country park by United Utilities. The river ceases to form the county boundary just before the lakes and re-emerges from a tunnel below the reservoir dam, passing east of Standish. It continues southwards to Wigan, where it flows through a long culvert under the railway near Wigan North Western station, is crossed again by the Leeds and Liverpool Canal, and heads northwest, closely paralleling the canal.

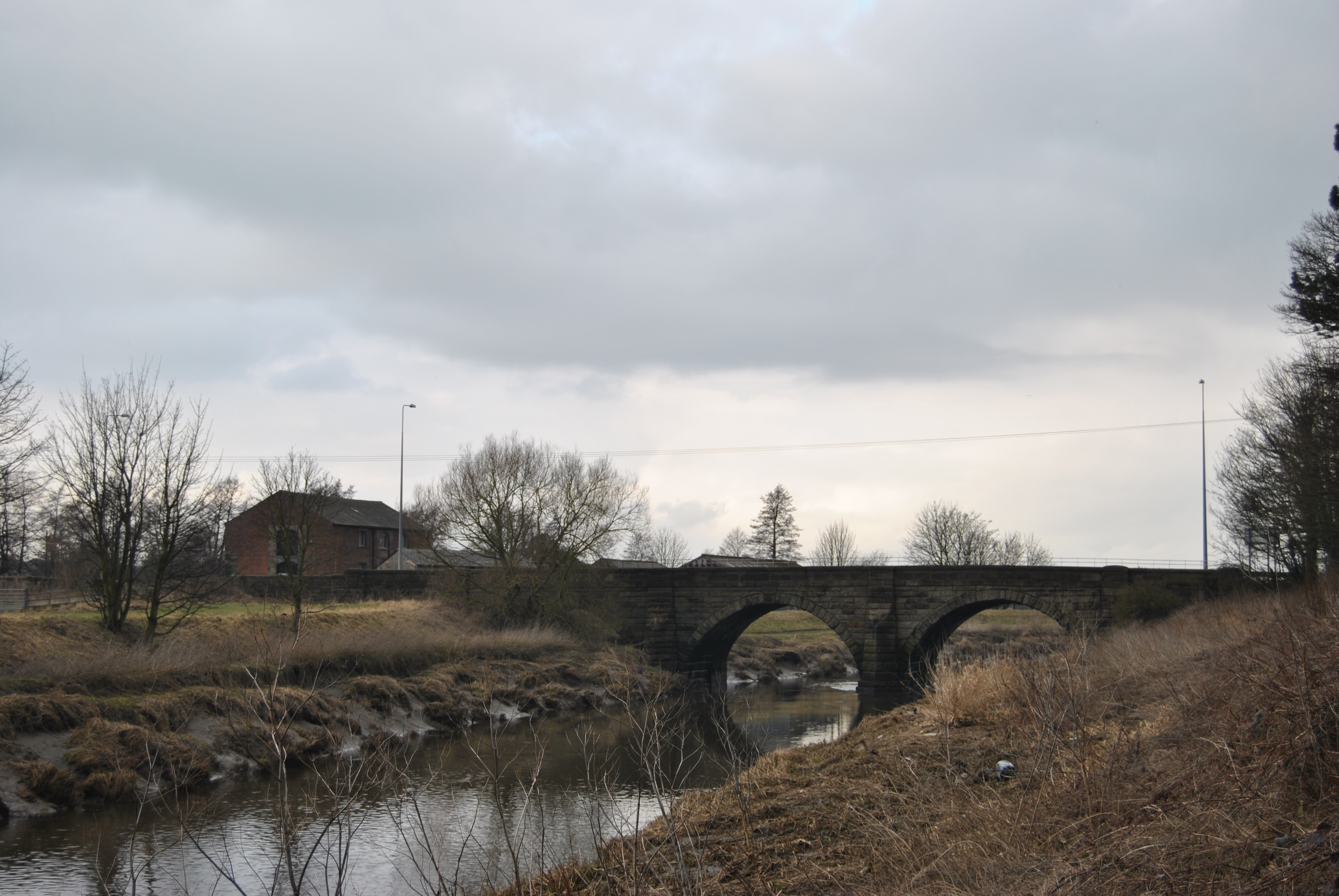
The River Douglas passing under Bank Bridge at Tarleton.

It is crossed by the M6 motorway and the Manchester-Southport line near Gathurst station, passes by the village of Appley Bridge, and at Parbold the canal crosses for the third time, as the river turns to the north and north-west. The aqueduct was designed by John Longbotham, has a semi-elliptical arch, and dates from 1791 to 1792. The river drops below the 33-foot (10 m) contour at Parbold, and continues across open countryside where it is joined by the River Tawd, flowing north from Skelmersdale, becoming tidal before it reaches the village of Rufford. White Bridge at Rufford is a grade II listed structure with three spans, constructed of squared sandstone. It carries the B5246 Station Road over the river, and dates from the time of the construction of the Douglas Navigation, between 1720 and 1742. Below the bridge, the channel is rather straighter. Until 1805, the river was joined by the Rufford Branch of the Leeds and Liverpool Canal at Sollom Lock, but the lock was abandoned and a new one built further downstream at Tarleton. In order to do this, a new channel was created for the river further to the east, and the original channel was reused by the canal. On the new section, Great Hanging Bridge is similar to White bridge, both in date and in its three arches, and it carries the A581 road. Below it, the river is joined by the River Yarrow, which has taken a more direct route from its source to this point. At Tarleton, another three-span bridge carries the A59 road over the river. It is built from rock-faced sandstone blocks, and the keystone on the southern side indicates it was constructed in 1821. The north side is of red sandstone, with indications that it might once have been part of a narrower bridge. After its junction with the canal at Tarleton Lock, the final 4 miles (6.4 km) of the river to its junction with the River Ribble, here also known as the River Asland, is used by boat traffic transferring from the Leeds and Liverpool Canal to the Lancaster Canal since the opening of the Ribble Link in 2002.

== Hydrology ==
The reservoirs of the Rivington Chain capture and store run-off from Winter Hill and Rivington Moor, much of which is used to provide a public water supply to areas of Lancashire and Greater Manchester. However, as a result of the original statutes that allowed them to be built, the water company is required to maintain some flow in the river below the reservoirs, and this compensation flow provides a fairly steady baseline flow in the river throughout the year. It is only normally exceeded if the reservoirs become full. On the upper reaches of the Douglas, the river bed is relatively steep, and consequently the river level can change quickly as a result of rainfall. As the river progresses to the west, the gradient lessens, and level changes occur more slowly.

There are two locations on the river where water is abstracted to maintain levels in the Leeds and Liverpool Canal. On many sections of the river, flows are augmented by the discharge from sewage treatment works. Major treatment works are located at Horwich on the upper river, at Wigan Wastewater Treatment works in Lathom on the lower section, and at Skelmersdale on the River Tawd. Upgrades to the Wigan and Skelmersdale Treatment Works have been carried out, to improve the quality of the final effluent before discharge into the river system, while in Wigan, the sewage system has been improved, to reduce the amount of raw sewage discharged into the river by combined sewer overflows. In Standish, the pumping station at Chorley Road has been upgraded to reduce its impact on the river, while in Horwich, there was an ongoing scheme in 2014 in which volunteers walked the river to identify pollution points, which were then followed up by officers from the Environment Agency. Run-off of nutrients and other pollutants from agricultural land has also been addressed through the Catchment Sensitive Farming project, run jointly by Natural England, the Environment Agency and the Department for Environment, Food and Rural Affairs. Another joint initiative between the Environment Agency and the Royal Society for the Protection of Birds has seen sea defences improved and 370 acres (150 ha) of saltmarsh created as part of the Hesketh Outmarsh Coastal Realignment project.

== Tributaries ==
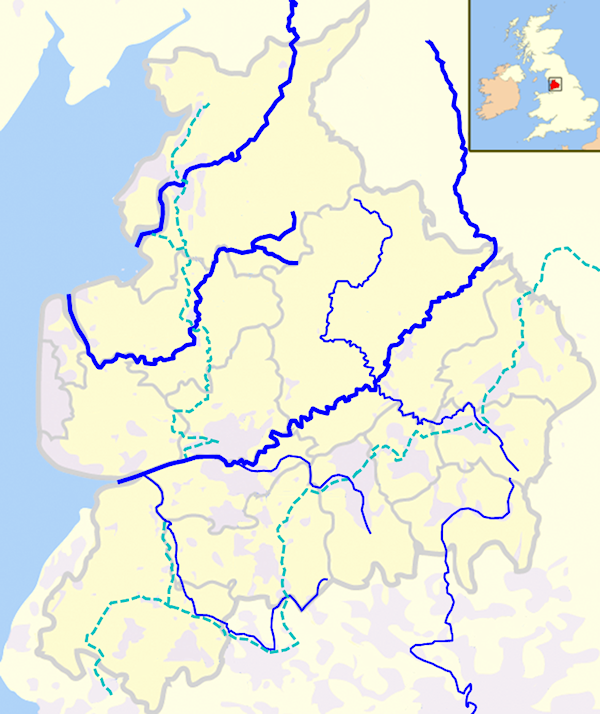
Settlements near the River Douglas
(shown with other rivers and canals in Lancashire)

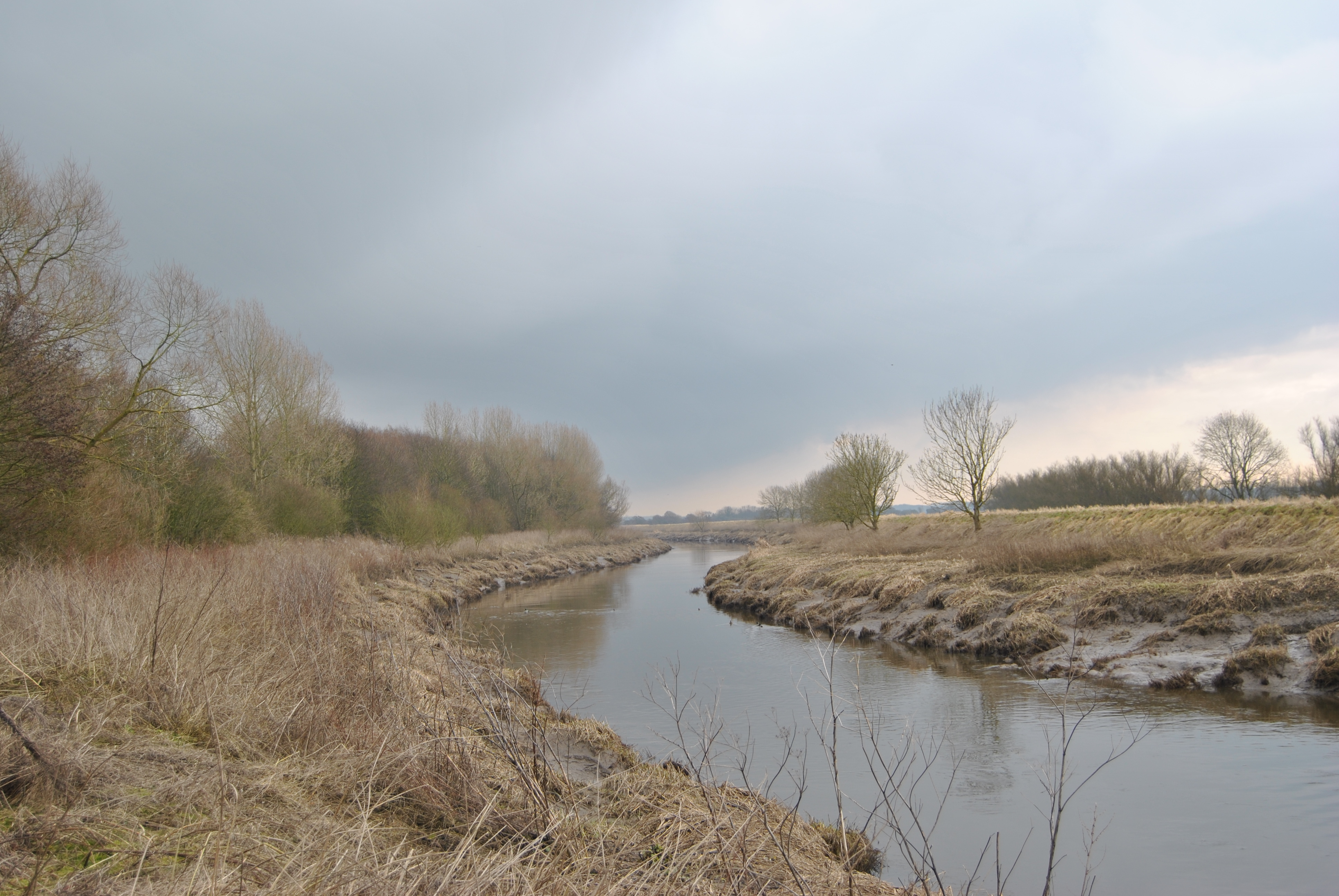
River Douglas from the gardens at Bank Hall.

- Longton Brook
- Centre Drain
- Carr Heys Watercourse
- Tarra Carr Gutter
  - Hall Pool
- Dunkirk Dib
- Rakes Brook
- Carr Brook
- Strine Brook
- River Yarrow
  - tributaries of the Yarrow listed under River Yarrow

- Main Ditch
- Eller Brook
  - Wham Ditch
  - Black Brook
  - Abbey Brook
    - New Park Brook
    - Castle Brook
    - Sefton Brook
      - Dungeon Brook
      - Dicket's Brook
        - Goose Brook
- Mill Ditch
  - New Reed Brook
  - Bentley Brook
- River Tawd
  - Slate Brook
  - Grimshaw Brook
- Middlehurst Brook
- Dock Brook
- Alder Lane Brook
- Sprodley Brook
- Calico Brook
- Lees Brook
- Dean Brook
  - Sand Brook
- Ackhurst Brook
- Mill Brook
- Bradshaw Brook
- Close Brook
- Barley Brook
- Smithy Brook
  - Poolstock Brook
    - Ince Brook
      - Hawkley Brook
      - Reed Brook
        - Park Brook
- Clarington Brook
- Bradley Brook
- Bucklow Brook
  - Moss Ditch
  - Buckow Brook
    - Hic-bibi Brook
      - Stars Brook
        - Almond Brook
        - Tunley Brook
- Pearl Brook
- Arley Brook

== Water quality ==
The Environment Agency measure the water quality of the river systems in England. Each is given an overall ecological status, which may be one of five levels: high, good, moderate, poor and bad. There are several components that are used to determine this, including biological status, which looks at the quantity and varieties of invertebrates, angiosperms and fish, and chemical status, which compares the concentrations of various chemicals against known safe concentrations. Chemical status is rated good or fail.

The water quality of the River Douglas system was as follows in 2016. The section marked Ribble covers the tidal River Ribble and the lower 4 miles (6.4 km) of tidal River Douglas. Reasons for the quality being less than good include sewage discharge for most of the river, together with physical modification of the channel and poor nutrient management of agricultural land on the lower sections.

| Section | Ecological Status | Chemical Status | Overall Status | Length | Catchment | Channel |
|---|---|---|---|---|---|---|
| Douglas - Upper | Moderate | Good | Moderate | 8.8 miles (14.2 km) | 17.78 square miles (46.0 km^{2}) | heavily modified |
| Buckhow (Hic Bibbi) Brook | Moderate | Good | Moderate | 5.9 miles (9.5 km) | 3.64 square miles (9.4 km^{2}) | heavily modified |
| Douglas - Mid | Moderate | Good | Moderate | 5.8 miles (9.3 km) | 6.65 square miles (17.2 km^{2}) | heavily modified |
| Douglas - Lower | Moderate | Good | Moderate | 15.3 miles (24.6 km) | 28.85 square miles (74.7 km^{2}) | heavily modified |
| Ribble | Bad | Good | Bad | | | heavily modified |

== Notes ==
| Next confluence upstream | River Ribble | Next confluence downstream |
| Freckleton Pool (north) | River Douglas, Lancashire | – |

== Bibliography ==
- CAMS (February 2013). Ribble, Douglas and Crossens abstraction licensing strategy (PDF). Environment Agency. Archived from the original (PDF) on 22 December 2014.
- CFMP (December 2009). River Douglas Catchment Flood Management Plan (PDF). Environment Agency. Archived (PDF) from the original on 30 May 2010.
- DMC (2014). Douglas Management Catchment. Environment Agency. Archived from the original on 20 March 2015.
- Cumberlidge, Jane (2009). Inland Waterways of Great Britain (8th Ed.). Imray Laurie Norie and Wilson. ISBN 978-1-84623-010-3.
- Hadfield, Charles; Biddle, Gordon (1970). The Canals of North West England, Vol 1 (pp.1-236). David and Charles. ISBN 978-0-7153-4956-4.
