= Grade II* listed buildings in East Northamptonshire =

There are over 20,000 Grade II* listed buildings in England. This page is a list of these buildings in the former district of East Northamptonshire in Northamptonshire, now part of the unitary authority area of North Northamptonshire.

== East Northamptonshire ==
Name	Location	Type	Completed (Note: The date given is the date used by Historic England as significant for the initial building or that of an important part in the structure's description.)	Date designated	Grid ref. (Note: The grid reference is based on the British national grid reference system, sometimes known as OSGB36, used by the Ordnance Survey.) Geo-coordinates	Entry number (Note: The "List Entry Number" is a unique number assigned to each listed building and scheduled monument by Historic England.)	Image
Ashton Mill	Ashton, East Northamptonshire	Corn Mill	C17-19	12 May 1969	TL0516688217; 52°28′54″N 0°27′10″W	1040278	Ashton Mill More images
Home Farm Cottage	Ashton Wold, Ashton	House	1900–1901	13 November 1998	TL0892987904; 52°28′42″N 0°23′51″W	1245640	Upload Photo
Home Farm, Farmbuildings	Ashton Wold, Ashton	Dovecote	1900–1901	13 November 1998	TL0895787934; 52°28′42″N 0°23′50″W	1271732	Upload Photo
Home Farm, the Old Dairy	Ashton Wold, Ashton	Dairy	1900–1901	13 November 1998	TL0895287896; 52°28′41″N 0°23′50″W	1271734	Upload Photo
All Saints Chancel	Barnwell All Saints, Barnwell	Church	13th century	23 May 1967	TL0486984417; 52°26′52″N 0°27′30″W	1294446	All Saints Chancel More images
Biggin Hall	Benefield	Country House	Medieval origins	23 May 1967	TL0108889137; 52°29′27″N 0°30′45″W	1040213	Biggin Hall More images
Church of St Mary	Lower Benefield, Benefield	Church	Medieval	23 May 1967	SP9881288470; 52°29′07″N 0°32′47″W	1189042	Church of St Mary More images
Church of the Holy Trinity	Blatherwycke	Church	11th century to 14th century	23 May 1967	SP9743595762; 52°33′04″N 0°33′52″W	1040093	Church of the Holy Trinity More images
Fermyn Woods Hall, and attached Stables and ancillary Buildings	Brigstock	Country House	Early/mid 17th century	23 May 1967	SP9581687120; 52°28′25″N 0°35′27″W	1189160	Fermyn Woods Hall, and attached Stables and ancillary Buildings More images
Manor House	Brigstock	Hall House	12th-century origins	26 May 1967	SP9452785228; 52°27′25″N 0°36′37″W	1040166	Upload Photo
Bulwick Hall and attached Entrance Loggia and Garden Room	Bulwick Park, Bulwick	Country House	c. 1676	23 May 1967	SP9588794050; 52°32′09″N 0°35′16″W	1293383	Bulwick Hall and attached Entrance Loggia and Garden Room More images
Gates and Gatepiers about 150m south-west of Bulwick Hall	Bulwick Park, Bulwick	Gate	Early 18th century	23 May 1967	SP9580293904; 52°32′05″N 0°35′21″W	1374888	Upload Photo
Church of St John the Baptist	Caldecott, Chelveston cum Caldecott	Church	Mid 13th century	23 May 1967	SP9884569126; 52°18′41″N 0°33′05″W	1040380	Church of St John the Baptist More images
Church of St Andrew	Collyweston	Church	11th century	23 May 1967	SK9960702885; 52°36′53″N 0°31′49″W	1374873	Church of St Andrew More images
Church of St Peter	Deene Park, Deene	Bust	1722	23 May 1967	SP9519092748; 52°31′27″N 0°35′54″W	1040134	Church of St Peter More images
Church of St Mary	Duddington, Duddington-with-Fineshade	Church	mid and late 12th century	23 May 1967	SK9877400884; 52°35′48″N 0°32′35″W	1040104	Church of St Mary More images
Glebe House and attached Steps and Railings	Easton on the Hill	House	1988	23 May 1967	TF0093704591; 52°37′47″N 0°30′36″W	1225510	Glebe House and attached Steps and Railings More images
Priest's House	Easton on the Hill	Priests House	Early 16th century	23 May 1967	TF0097204548; 52°37′46″N 0°30′35″W	1225369	Priest's House More images
RAF Wittering: Nuclear Fissile Core Stores, Buildings A09, A10, A11, A14, A15, A27, VW28, A29 and A33	Easton on the Hill, East Northamptonshire	Nuclear Fissile Core Store	Built 1952	11 July 2011	TF0148201667; 52°36′12″N 0°30′11″W	1402763	Upload Photo
Church of St Leonard	Glapthorn	Church	12th century	23 May 1967	TL0242290202; 52°30′00″N 0°29′33″W	1371965	Church of St Leonard More images
Church of All Saints	Great Addington	Church	12th century	23 May 1967	SP9586275114; 52°21′57″N 0°35′37″W	1040381	Church of All Saints More images
Church of All Saints and Chest Tomb attached to North Aisle	Hargrave	Church	Late 12th century	23 May 1967	TL0365970638; 52°19′27″N 0°28′50″W	1191820	Church of All Saints and Chest Tomb attached to North Aisle More images
Harringworth Lodge	Harringworth	Hunting Lodge	13th century origins	23 May 1967	SP9320895269; 52°32′50″N 0°37′37″W	1040116	Harringworth Lodge More images
Church of St Peter and St Paul	Hemington	Church	13th-century origins	23 May 1967	TL0918884996; 52°27′07″N 0°23′41″W	1040226	Church of St Peter and St Paul More images
College House	Higham Ferrers	House	1633	23 September 1950	SP9604668651; 52°18′27″N 0°35′34″W	1040389	Upload Photo
5 Market Square	Higham Ferrers	House	Mid 17th century	23 September 1950	SP9601968497; 52°18′22″N 0°35′35″W	1371874	Upload Photo
Hall Farmhouse	King's Cliffe	Farmhouse	Late Medieval	23 May 1967	TL0075997066; 52°33′44″N 0°30′54″W	1225654	Upload Photo
Church of All Saints	Laxton	Church	12th century	23 May 1967	SP9505596011; 52°33′13″N 0°35′58″W	1233912	Church of All Saints More images
Laxton Hall and attached Steps and Balustrade	Laxton Park, Laxton	Country House	Late 18th century	23 May 1967	SP9597997065; 52°33′47″N 0°35′08″W	1276360	Laxton Hall and attached Steps and Balustrade More images
Church of St John the Baptist	Slipton, Lowick	Church	13th century	23 May 1967	SP9525779341; 52°24′14″N 0°36′04″W	1040269	Church of St John the Baptist More images
Flight of Steps with Urns adjacent to north Front of Drayton House	Drayton Park, Lowick	Steps	Early 18th century	31 July 1987	SP9630680064; 52°24′36″N 0°35′08″W	1040297	Upload Photo
Flight of Steps with Urns about 90m east of east Front of Drayton House	Drayton Park, Lowick, East Northamptonshire	Steps	Early 18th century	31 July 1987	SP9637680132; 52°24′39″N 0°35′04″W	1040301	Upload Photo
Retaining Wall, Steps and Urns extending about 80m from south to east Front of Drayton House	Drayton Park, Lowick	Garden Wall	Late 16th century	31 July 1987	SP9637580078; 52°24′37″N 0°35′05″W	1040299	Upload Photo
Stables attached to south-west of Drayton House	Drayton Park, Lowick	Wall	mid/late 17th century	23 May 1967	SP9636079957; 52°24′33″N 0°35′05″W	1192040	Upload Photo
Statue of Bacchus about 25m east of east Front of Drayton House	Drayton Park, Lowick	Statue	c. 1718	31 July 1987	SP9633280100; 52°24′38″N 0°35′07″W	1371924	Upload Photo
Statue of Flora around 25m east of east Front of Drayton House	Drayton Park, Lowick	Statue	c. 1718	31 July 1987	SP9635780087; 52°24′37″N 0°35′05″W	1192227	Upload Photo
Statue of Samson and the Philistine about 110m east of east Front of Drayton House	Drayton Park, Lowick, East Northamptonshire	Statue	Early 18th century	31 July 1987	SP9639480155; 52°24′39″N 0°35′03″W	1371923	Upload Photo
Walls, Gatepier and attached Banqueting House and Balustrade about 80m east of Drayton House	Drayton Park, Lowick, East Northamptonshire	Balustrade	Late 17th century	23 May 1967	SP9634780146; 52°24′39″N 0°35′06″W	1040298	Upload Photo
Walls, Gatepiers, Gates and Screens south and east of Drayton House; and Banqueting House, Balustrade, Statue and Cistern	Drayton Park, Lowick	Balustrade	late C17/early 18th century	23 May 1967	SP9646079966; 52°24′33″N 0°35′00″W	1371922	Upload Photo
Church of St Margaret	Luddington-in-the-Brook, Luddington	Church	13th century to 15th century	23 May 1967	TL1031383665; 52°26′23″N 0°22′43″W	1040228	Church of St Margaret More images
Manor House	Nassington	Manor House	Early 16th century	23 May 1967	TL0628896176; 52°33′11″N 0°26′02″W	1065895	Upload Photo
Bramston House Central Building	Oundle	House	Late 17th century	18 June 1955	TL0420088072; 52°28′50″N 0°28′02″W	1039859	Upload Photo
Bramston House East Wing	Oundle	House	18th century	18 June 1955	TL0421588086; 52°28′51″N 0°28′01″W	1039860	Upload Photo
Branston House West Wing	Oundle	House	Early 18th century	18 June 1955	TL0418788062; 52°28′50″N 0°28′02″W	1190599	Upload Photo
Latham's Hospital	Oundle	Almshouses	1830	18 June 1955	TL0428588308; 52°28′58″N 0°27′57″W	1039800	Latham's Hospital
Oundle School Memorial Chapel	Oundle	School	1922-3	7 June 1974	TL0383388338; 52°28′59″N 0°28′21″W	1039825	Oundle School Memorial Chapel More images
Paine's Almshouses	Oundle	Wall	Early 17th century	18 June 1955	TL0384788113; 52°28′52″N 0°28′20″W	1039816	Paine's Almshouses
Stable Block and Barn to West of No 16 including linking Wall and Gate Piers	Oundle	Gate		18 June 1955	TL0400588065; 52°28′50″N 0°28′12″W	1039780	Upload Photo
The White Lion Public House	Oundle	Public House	Early 17th century	18 June 1955	TL0425588164; 52°28′53″N 0°27′59″W	1039840	Upload Photo
Upper House	Oundle	House		18 June 1955	TL0426488191; 52°28′54″N 0°27′58″W	1039841	Upload Photo
12 North Street	Oundle	House	1661	7 June 1974	TL0425788183; 52°28′54″N 0°27′58″W	1293575	Upload Photo
4 and 6 Market Place	Oundle	House	Early 18th century	18 June 1955	TL0412588075; 52°28′50″N 0°28′06″W	1293722	Upload Photo
13 Market Place	Oundle	House	Late 17th century	18 June 1955	TL0416788112; 52°28′52″N 0°28′03″W	1372120	Upload Photo
Church of St Mary and All Saints	Pilton	Church	Late 12th century	23 May 1967	TL0247784546; 52°26′57″N 0°29′37″W	1294190	Church of St Mary and All Saints More images
Churchyard Cross about 8m south of South Aisle of Church of St Peter	Raunds	Cross	14th century or 15th century	26 April 1950	TL0004073068; 52°20′48″N 0°31′58″W	1371901	Upload Photo
No 59, Thorpe St (Thorpe House) and attached Wall to South	Raunds	Farmhouse	Mid 16th century	26 April 1950	SP9989472344; 52°20′24″N 0°32′07″W	1040345	Upload Photo
Rushden Hall	Rushden	Country House/Offices	14th century or 15th century	9 December 1949	SP9560566323; 52°17′12″N 0°35′59″W	1225991	Upload Photo
Church of St Mary	Southwick	Church	14th century	23 May 1967	TL0208592081; 52°31′01″N 0°29′49″W	1190967	Church of St Mary More images
Stanwick Hall	Stanwick	Country House	17th century	26 April 1950	SP9753171197; 52°19′49″N 0°34′13″W	1192263	Stanwick Hall More images
The Old Rectory	Stanwick	House	1717	26 April 1950	SP9793571469; 52°19′57″N 0°33′51″W	1286673	Upload Photo
Church of St Rumbald	Stoke Doyle	Church	c1722-25	23 May 1967	TL0265486261; 52°27′53″N 0°29′26″W	1040178	Church of St Rumbald More images
Church of All Saints	Sudborough	Cross	Saxon	23 May 1967	SP9676882108; 52°25′42″N 0°34′42″W	1226485	Church of All Saints More images
Church of St Mary the Virgin	Tansor	Church	Late 11th century	23 May 1967	TL0535390894; 52°30′21″N 0°26′57″W	1191175	Church of St Mary the Virgin More images
Church of St John the Baptist	Achurch, Thorpe Achurch	Church	Early 13th century	23 May 1967	TL0213883136; 52°26′12″N 0°29′56″W	1040142	Church of St John the Baptist More images
Church of St James	Thrapston	Church	13th century	23 May 1967	SP9970378698; 52°23′50″N 0°32′10″W	1265715	Church of St James More images
Church of St Nicholas	Twywell	Church	12th century	23 May 1967	SP9518078183; 52°23′36″N 0°36′10″W	1226021	Church of St Nicholas More images
Church of St Michael and All Angels	Wadenhoe	Church	Late 12th century	23 May 1967	TL0086383284; 52°26′18″N 0°31′04″W	1227141	Church of St Michael and All Angels More images
Manor House	Warmington	Manor House	1677	23 May 1967	TL0770391284; 52°30′32″N 0°24′52″W	1191298	Manor House More images
Manor House Farmhouse	Woodford	Farmhouse	1987	23 May 1967	SP9666776838; 52°22′52″N 0°34′52″W	1225978	Upload Photo
Church of St Mary	Woodnewton	Church	11th century to 15th century	23 May 1967	TL0321094572; 52°32′21″N 0°28′47″W	1065862	Church of St Mary More images
Church of St Mary Magdalene	Yarwell	Church	13th century	23 May 1967	TL0709497761; 52°34′02″N 0°25′17″W	1225878	Church of St Mary Magdalene More images
