= Deenethorpe =

Village in Northamptonshire, England

Coordinates: 52.5090°N 0.5937°W

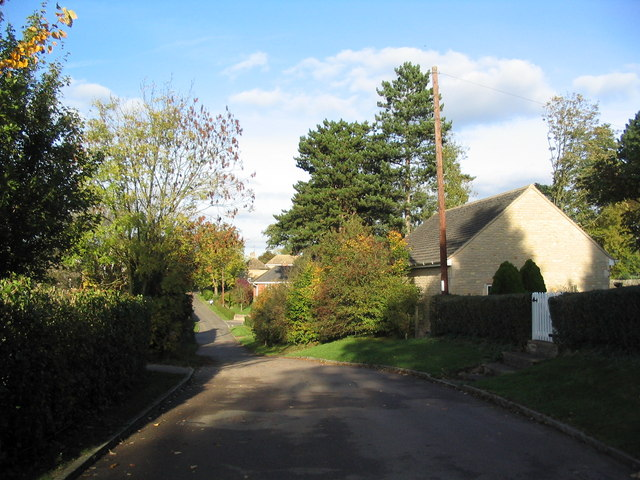
- A small village in Deenethorpe.

- Location within Northamptonshire
- Population: 133
- OS grid reference: SP9591
- Unitary authority: North Northamptonshire
- Ceremonial county: Northamptonshire
- Region: East Midlands
- Country: England
- Sovereign state: United Kingdom
- Post town: Corby
- Postcode district: NN17
- Dialling code: 01780
- Police: Northamptonshire
- Fire: Northamptonshire
- Ambulance: East Midlands
- UK Parliament: Corby and East Northamptonshire

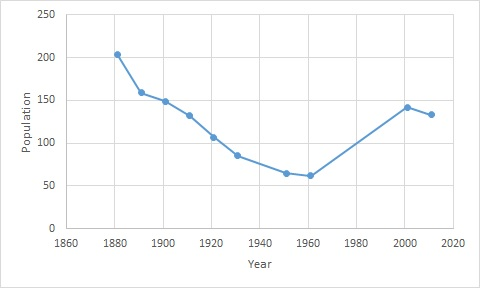
Total population of Deenethorpe civil parish, as reported by the Census of Population from 1881 to 2011.

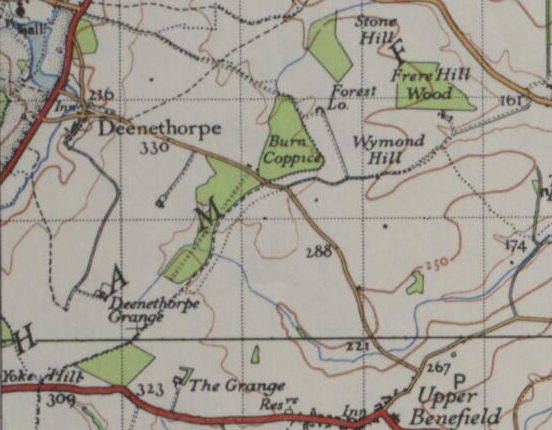
This is an image showing a map of Deenethorpe in the 20th century.

Deenethorpe is a village and civil parish in North Northamptonshire, England. It is situated north-east of Corby and near the A43 road between Corby and Stamford. Nearby villages are Deene located 1.9 miles (3.1 km) to the North-West, Bulwick 1.9 miles (3.1 km) and Upper Benefield 2.5 miles (4.0 km) South-East to Deenethorpe.

In the early 1870s, Deenethorpe was described as:

"Deenethorpe parish, Northampton; 1 mile SSE of Deene village. Real property, £1, 942. Houses, 48."

The population of Deenethorpe in the 1881 census was just over 200. Since then, there was a decline in the first half of the 20th century, as shown by the total population graph, where it reached a low of around 60 people. In 1960 the population increased and at the time of the 2001 census, the parish's population was 103 people and according to the 2011 census the population is currently at 133. The pre-dominant age group living in Deenethorpe is middle-age as there are 48 people aged between 45 and 59.

The 600 acres (240 ha) Deenethorpe airfield is one of the sites that has been approved for a "garden village" in 2017. The plans include a village green, shops and community hall, as well as more than 1,000 homes.

== History ==
The villages name means 'Deene's outlying farm/settlement'. 'Deene' meaning 'valley'.

RAF Deenethorpe was used as a purpose-built base to serve American heavy bombers during the Second World War. All the buildings on the site, which included administrative and accommodation blocks, were only temporary. The 401st bombardment group was based here from 3 November 1943 and 20 June 1945.

=== Medieval and later ===
Medieval settlement remains, which were formerly part of Deenethorpe village, are located South side of the Benefield Road and on the steep side of the valley. On the site itself, in a low mound, which has been almost entirely been ploughed out, there is an abundance of medieval pottery, including Lyveden wares.

=== Cultivation remains ===
Common fields of the parish existed in the late 16th century and at this time there were four open fields around and to the South of Deenethorpe. There are also extensive areas of old enclosures to the South-East of the parish which existed in 1633, however by the middle of the 18th century the current fields seen today had already been made.

Deenethorpe is thought to have been part of Deene due to the shape of the parish and the name suggests it stemmed as a secondary settlement of Deene.

Deenethorpe is not found in the Domesday Book.

== Topography ==
Most of the land is made almost entirely of boulder clay with the exception of the slim bands of limestone, marls and sands along the valley of the Willow Brook.

The village lies on the South East side of the Willow Brook river and to the North West of Deenethorpe is the local church called St Peter's Church located in Deene. Deenethorpe Lane runs through the entire village with the exit to the North onto the A43. The other main road is Benefield Road cutting across the village from East to West which also exits onto the A43. The former Second World War airfield RAF Deenethorpe is situated south of the village and is currently known as Deenethorpe Airfield.

== St Peter's Church ==
St Peter's Church, Deene is the nearest church to Deenethorpe. The 13th-century estate church belonged to the Brudenell family who bought Deene Park in 1514. It remains a consecrated church but is in the care of the Churches Conservation Trust.

== Industry ==
In 1881, the main occupation for males was in the agriculture industry which was mainly due to the rural location of the village and the vast amount of open land in the surroundings. For females the main occupation was through Domestic Service or Offices, as shown on the graph. There has been a change in the main jobs for the residents of Deenethorpe and from the 2011 census the main occupation is in whole sale and retail trade including repairs of motor vehicles and motor cycles with 20% of the village population. The second highest employed industry is in real estate activities with 14%.

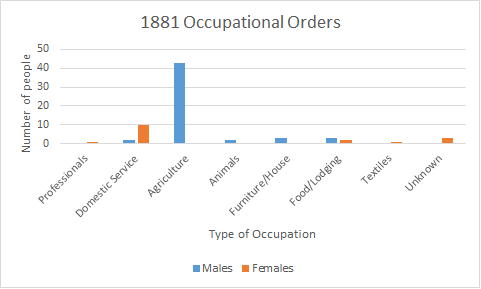
This Graph shows the different occupations in Deenethorpe for both males and females in 1881.

== Amenities ==
The main type of housing in the village are houses, cottage and bungalows. Kings Cliffe Endowed primary school serves as the main primary school for children, between the ages of 4–11 years, in Deenethorpe and is approximately 6.3 miles (via the A43) North-East of the village.
