= Lilford =

Coordinates: 52.4418°N 0.4824°W

- Hamlet
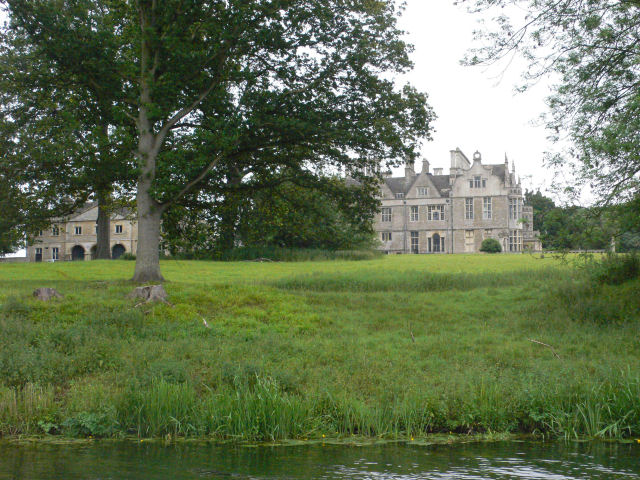

- Location within Northamptonshire
- OS grid reference: TL 03253 83733
  - London: 106 km
- Civil parish: Lilford-cum-Wigsthorpe
- Unitary authority: North Northamptonshire
- Ceremonial county: Northamptonshire
- Region: East Midlands
- Country: England
- Sovereign state: United Kingdom
- Post town: Peterborough
- Postcode district: PE8
- Police: Northamptonshire
- Fire: Northamptonshire
- Ambulance: East Midlands

Lilford is a small village in the civil parish of Lilford-cum-Wigsthorpe, in the North Northamptonshire district, in the ceremonial county of Northamptonshire, England. It is situated approximately 7 miles northeast of the market town of Thrapston, Lilford is known for its picturesque countryside, historic landmarks, and a rich agricultural heritage.

== History ==
The hamlet of Lilford dates back to a Roman settlement, this was discovered by uncovering Roman artefacts and burial grounds in the area. Yet moving into the Medieval times Lilford was a village of approximately 12 houses by 1700, partnered with a daughter hamlet called Wigsthorpe, also with 12 houses. However, it was not in the same location as it is now, it used to reside south of Lilford Park near a spring of water. This was until 1755 when Sir Thomas Powys, owner of the hall at the time, demolished the entire village and rebuilt closer to the estate which is where it resides now. The church stood until 1788 until that went down with the rest, some ruins were re-erected which is where they remain hidden today. Apart from this, there is no indication of the original village of Lilford at the site, thus making it the "deserted village of Northants". The hamlet of Lilford in its new location included many farmland facilities such as a cow barn, hay barns and an array of farmhouses. It also held a schoolhouse, greenhouses, and water pumps.

Thomas Powys inherited Lilford Hall in 1767 from his father and became the first Baron and Lord of Lilford. Before his title, he was the MP for Northamptonshire and only became the 1st Baron in 1797 but died in 1800. After the 2nd Baron, also Thomas Powys, the estate was inherited by the 3rd Baron of Lilford. He was also the lord of the bedchamber to King William IV and assisted the king with his dressing, waiting on him for private meals, guarding access to the bedchamber and closet and providing companionship to the king. He died in 1861 after becoming one of the richest men in England. The 4th Baron of Lilford was the most influential Baron to the land, also named Thomas Powys he inherited the hall after his father. He had a passion for ornithology and was devoted to studying animals all over the world. He had built aviaries on Lilford Hall land and was noted for the collection of their birds of prey. They also featured birds from all around the globe and were responsible for introducing the Little Owl into England in the 1880s. Yet earlier, in 1874 he discovered a new species of Lizard in the Balearic Islands, Spain. He called it Lilford’s Wall Lizard, after Lilford itself. Unfortunately, after the death of his first son, he became impaired due to gout in his hands and died in 1896. He is mentioned in the book “The Decent of Man” by Charles Darwin during a chapter on birds. The senior line of Powys died out in 1949.

Just before the end of the Powys's ownership over the Lilford estate the country was hit with World War II, in 1934 the 303rd Station Hospital was established by the American Air Force in Lilford Park. Yet before this, the first 303rd Station Hospital was established by Major Thomas Thompson at Camp McCall in North Carolina in July 1943, it wasn’t until September that over 500 medical personnel embarked on a cruise ship for 21 days from New York Harbor to Glasgow, Scotland where they travelled down by train to Peterborough and then to Thrapson, this is where they were taken to the 303rd station hospital location on the Lilford Hall estate. This was for men returning from combat at the Molesworth Air Base, Polebrook Air Base and Grafton Underwood Airbase. It was originally a 750-bed hospital but later expanded to 1,500 beds after D-day, and the 75 nurses had accommodation inside Lilford Hall itself. The hospital was later disbanded in May 1945. After the end of WWII, the former hospital buildings became a technical school for the Polish citizens who fled the Russians and Germans during the war. Amongst the other governmentally set up Polish schools, this being facilities set up at universities as well as two grammar schools and two secondary schools, there was Lilford Technical School. A boarding school for young Polish orphans, this school equipped young people with language and work skills so they could eventually earn a living in the UK. Of all the Polish schools in the UK, Lilford Technical School was the most interesting. It became a school to learn a range of abilities for boys aged 13–17. The school provided two courses, a 3-year and a 4-year course. For the younger boys they were expected to achieve a high academic standard while the older boys did workshop practice to prepare them for the working world. In 1951 the school consisted of over 400 boys, it had flourished with its academic standards and variety of subjects. This school even had levelled football pitches, a grandstand, a tennis court, a basketball court and even had 6 canoes for the River Nene, all of which were built by the students themselves. However, the school closed down in 1954 and the buildings themselves disappeared over the following decades.

Lilford was recorded in the Domesday Book as Lilleforde.
