= Glebe (disambiguation) =

Glebe is an area of land within an ecclesiastical parish used to support a parish priest.

Glebe or The Glebe may also refer to:

== Places ==
=== Australia ===
- Glebe, Tasmania, a suburb of Hobart
- Glebe, New South Wales, a suburb of Sydney
- Glebe Park, Canberra, a public park

=== Barbados ===
- The Glebe, Barbados, a village in Saint George

=== Canada ===
- The Glebe, a historic neighbourhood in Ottawa, Ontario

=== Northern Ireland ===
- Glebe, County Antrim, a townland in County Antrim
- Glebe, County Armagh, a townland in County Armagh
- Glebe, County Down, a townland in County Down
- Glebe, County Londonderry, a townland in County Londonderry
- Glebe, County Tyrone, a small village

=== Republic of Ireland ===
- Glebe, Ballyloughloe, a townland in Ballyloughloe civil parish, barony of Clonlonan, County Westmeath
- Glebe, Bunown, a townland in Bunown civil parish, barony of Kilkenny West, County Westmeath
- Glebe, County Donegal, a townland
- Glebe, Killucan, a townland in Killucan civil parish, barony of Farbill, County Westmeath
- Glebe, Leny, a townland in Leny civil parish, barony of Corkaree, County Westmeath
- Glebe, Piercetown, a townland in Piercetown civil parish, barony of Rathconrath, County Westmeath
- Glebe, Taghmon, a townland in Taghmon civil parish, barony of Corkaree, County Westmeath

=== New Zealand ===
- The Glebe (Lower Hutt), one of the oldest buildings in Wellington

=== Switzerland ===
- Le Glèbe, a former municipality in the canton of Fribourg

=== United States ===
- The Glebe (Amherst, Virginia), a historic house
- The Glebe (Arlington, Virginia), a historic house
- The Glebe (Yonkers, New York), a historic Rectory, site of Revolutionary war skirmishes
- Glebe, West Virginia, an unincorporated community
- Glebe Creek, a river in Maryland
- Glebe Road, a highway in Arlington County, Virginia

== Other uses ==
- Glebe terrier, a document listing ecclesiastical glebes
- The Glebe (literary magazine), published in the United States in 1913–1914
- Glebe (rugby league team), the first Rugby League club formed in Australia
- Glebe Collegiate Institute, a secondary school in Ottawa, Canada
- Glebe Park, Brechin, a multi-use stadium in Scotland
- Glebe Rangers F.C., a football club in Northern Ireland

== See also ==
- Glebe House (disambiguation)
