= Glebe House =

Glebe House may refer to:

in England

- Glebe House School, Hunstanton, Norfolk
- Glebe House, Easton on the Hill, Northamptonshire

in Ireland

- Glebe House and Gallery, a museum in Letterkenny, County Donegal

in the United States (by state)

- Glebe House (Woodbury, Connecticut), listed on the NRHP in Litchfield County, Connecticut
- Glebe House (New Castle, Delaware)
- Glebe House (Princess Anne, Maryland)
- Glebe House (Poughkeepsie, New York)
- Glebe House (Charleston, South Carolina), HABS-documented, included in Charleston Historic District
- Glebe House (Arlington, Virginia)
- Abingdon Glebe House, Gloucester, Virginia
- Glebe House of Southwark Parish, Spring Grove, Virginia
- Glebe House of St. Anne's Parish, Champlain, Virginia

== See also ==
- Glebe (disambiguation)
