= Thorpe Waterville =

Village in Northamptonshire, England

Coordinates: 52.4236°N 0.4964°W

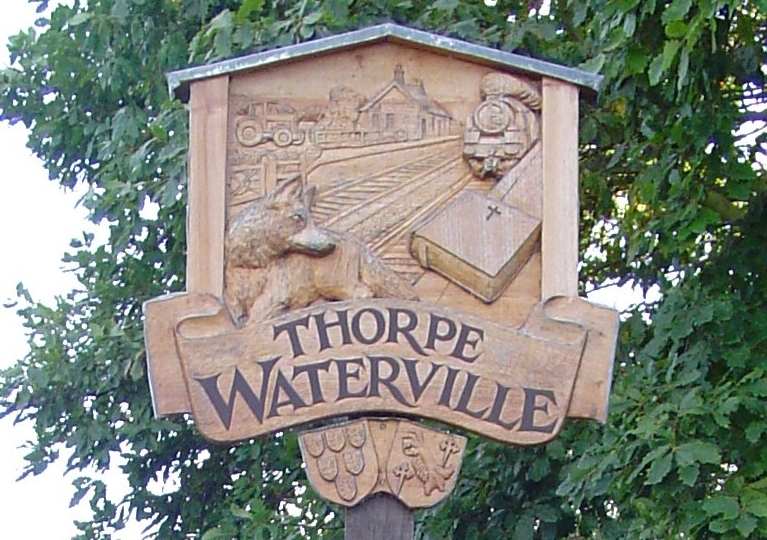
- Village sign

- Location within Northamptonshire
- OS grid reference: TL0281
- Civil parish: Thorpe Achurch
- Unitary authority: North Northamptonshire
- Ceremonial county: Northamptonshire
- Region: East Midlands
- Country: England
- Sovereign state: United Kingdom
- Post town: Kettering
- Postcode district: NN14
- Dialling code: 01832
- Police: Northamptonshire
- Fire: Northamptonshire
- Ambulance: East Midlands
- UK Parliament: Corby and East Northamptonshire

Thorpe Waterville is a village in the civil parish of Thorpe Achurch in the North Northamptonshire district of Northamptonshire, England. It was first attested in 1199 as Torp(e), and Thorp Watervile in 1300. Ascelin de Waterville was a landowner in the area in the 12th century.

== Geography and administration ==
Thorpe Waterville lies on the A605 road, three miles north-east of the town of Thrapston. It is located close to the River Nene.

Thorpe Waterville is one of the two main settlements in the civil parish of Thorpe Achurch, the other being Achurch. The parish of Thorpe Achurch was united with the neighbouring parish of Lilford-cum-Wigsthorpe in 1778 for ecclesiastical purposes. They remain separate civil parishes, but share a grouped parish council.

== Historical buildings ==
Thorpe Waterville Castle, of which only a building used as a barn remains, was mainly the work of Walter de Langton, Bishop of Lichfield and Treasurer to King Edward I.

Chapel Cottage bears a date stone marked with the year 1618, which is carved into the right hand side of the ingle nook fireplace. Reference to this the date stone is made in R. Gough's 1806 Translation of Camden's Britannia with Additions, Northamptonshire p. 283:

Robert Brown, founder of the sect of the Browniſts, [...] resided in a little thatched house in Thorpe Waterville which is still subsisting, with a date on the chimney 1618

During its renovation in the late 1970s, following a thatch roof fire, builders discovered what was rumoured to be one end of a tunnel stretching from the Manor House to Chapel Cottage. The owners of the cottage were reluctant to excavate the tunnel entrance fully so the validity of this cannot be confirmed.
