= Bulwick Meadows =

Protected area in Northamptonshire, England

Coordinates: 52.539°N 0.584°W

- Site of Special Scientific Interest
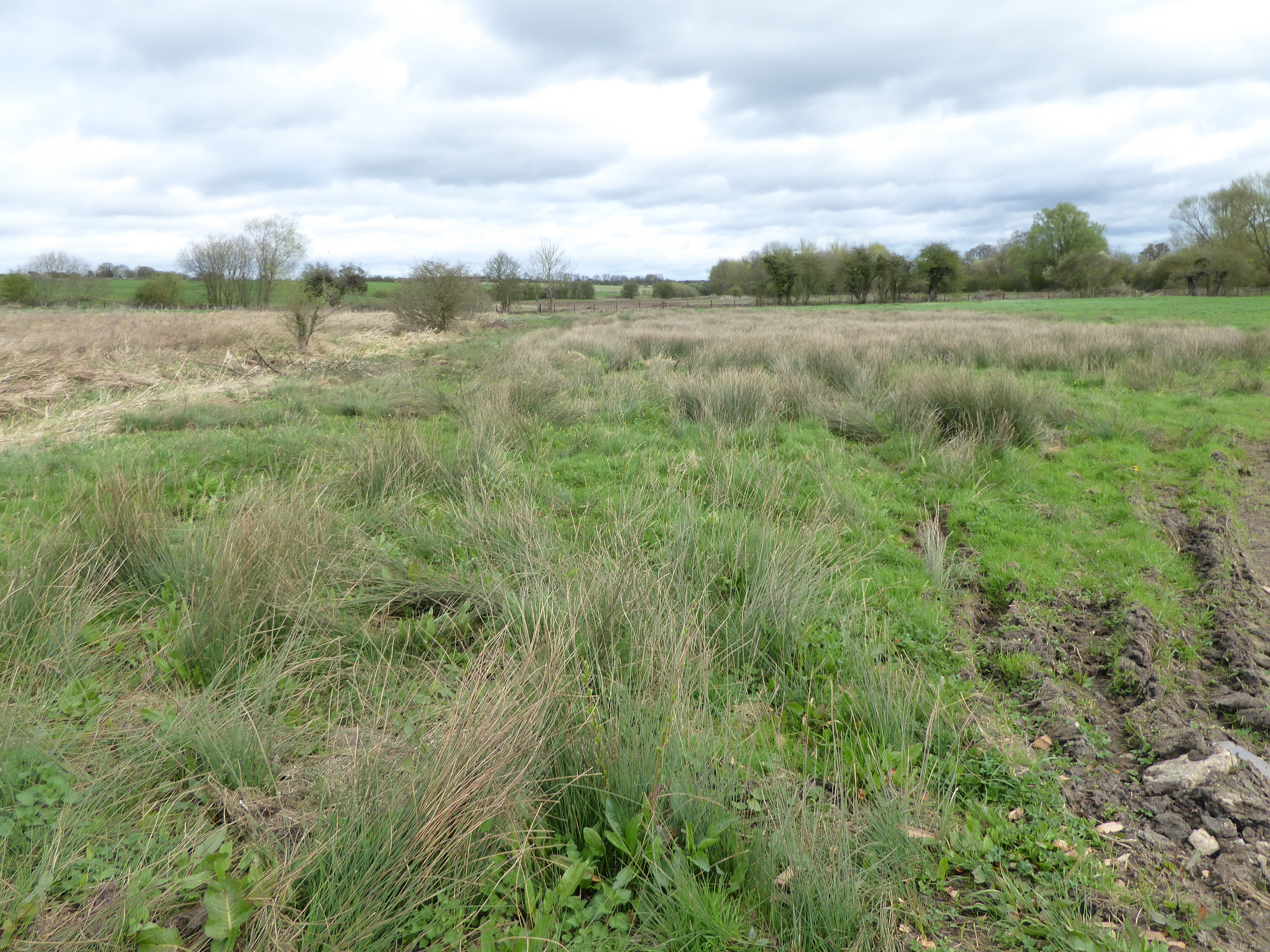
- Location of Bulwick Meadows.
- Area of search: Northamptonshire
- Grid reference: SP 961 943
- Interest: Biological
- Area: 4.2 hectares
- Notification date: 1984
- Location map: Magic Map

Bulwick Meadows is a 4.2-hectare (10-acre) biological Site of Special Scientific Interest in Bulwick, north-east of Corby in Northamptonshire.

These marshy meadows are in the flood plain of the Willow Brook. There are diverse wetland flora, including rare species, and it is the only known locality in the county for the flat-sedge Blysmus compressus and common bistort. It is also one of the very few sites in the county where snipe breed.

Main Road in Bulwick bisects the site, and Willow Brook runs along its eastern boundary. There is no public access to the southern part, but a footpath runs through the northern one.
