= Thomas Powys (judge) =

English lawyer, judge and Tory politician

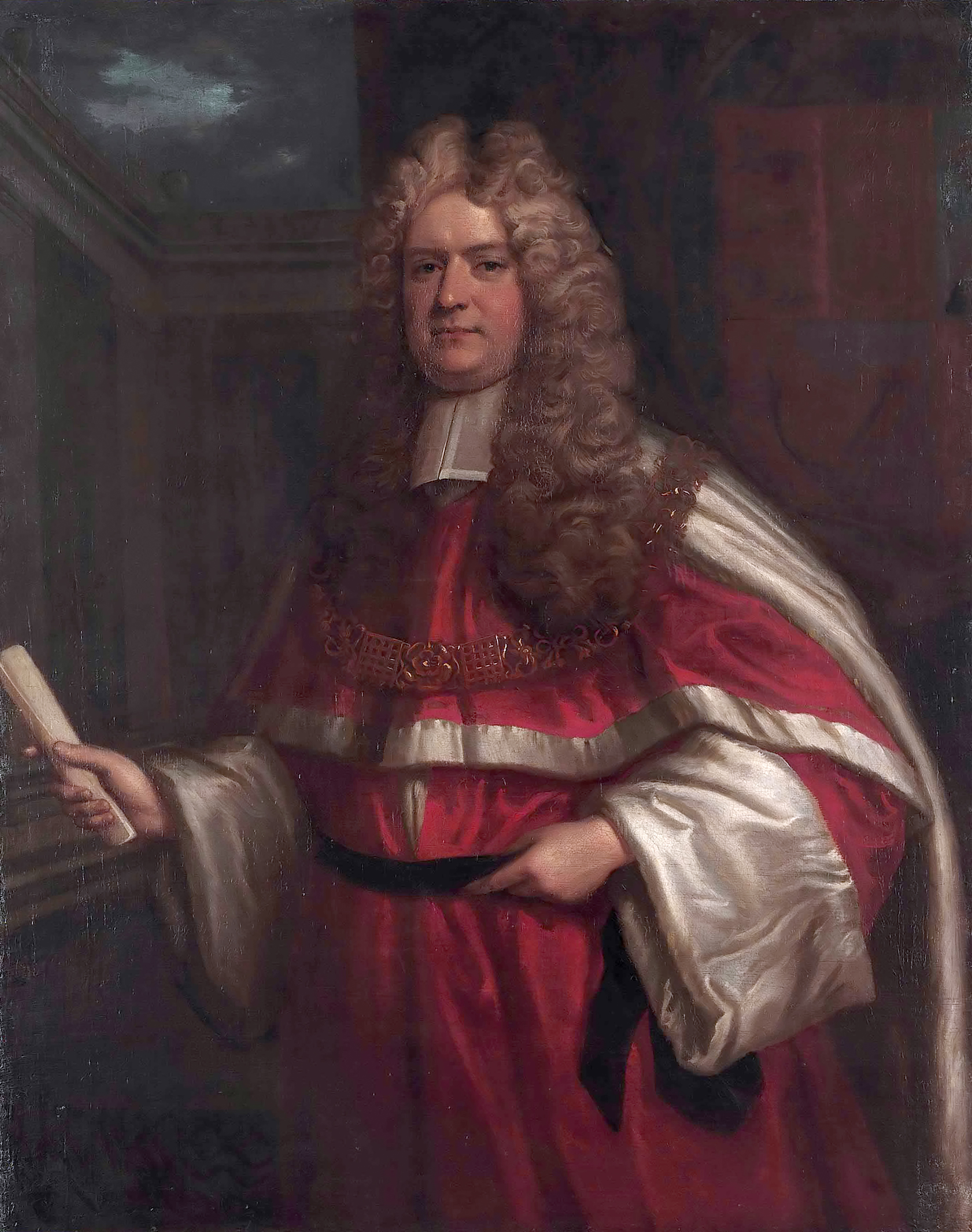
Thomas Powys (1649-1719) (Follower of Godfrey Kneller)

Sir Thomas Powys (1649 – 4 April 1719), of Henley, near Ludlow, Shropshire and Lilford cum Wigsthorpe, Northamptonshire, was an English lawyer, judge and Tory politician, who sat in the English and British House of Commons between 1701 and 1713. He was attorney general to King James II and was chief prosecutor at the trial of the Seven Bishops in June 1688. He served as Justice of the King's Bench from 1713 to 1714, but was dismissed.

== Early years ==
Powys was the second son of Thomas Powys of Henley Hall in Shropshire and his first wife, Anne Littleton, daughter of Sir Adam Littleton, 1st Baronet. His father was serjeant-at-law and a Bencher of Lincoln's Inn. He was the younger brother of Sir Littleton Powys (1647–1732). Powys was educated at Shrewsbury School, and matriculated at Queen's College, Oxford on 20 May 1664, aged 15. His son, another Thomas Powys, was admitted at Lincoln's Inn on 19 February 1696 and the father was called to the bar in 1673.

== Career ==
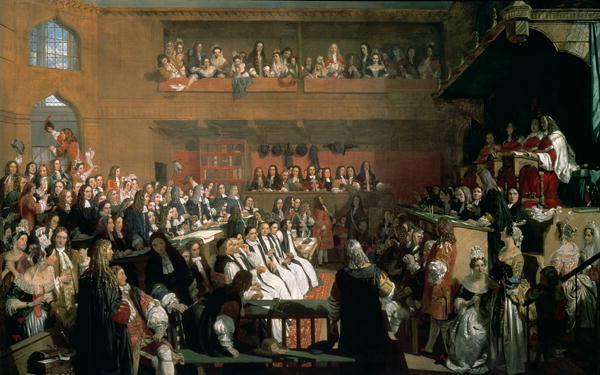
Powys was chief prosecutor at the trial of the Seven Bishops.

Powys was attorney-general for Denbighshire and Montgomeryshire from 1680 to 1686 and was knighted on 23 April 1686. He became solicitor-general in 1686, when Heneage Finch was dismissed. Having acquiesced in the appointment of Roman Catholics to office, and argued in favour of the king's dispensing power, he was promoted to attorney-general in December 1687, the same year that he became treasurer of Lincoln's Inn.

=== Trial of the Seven Bishops ===
Powys conducted the prosecution of the Seven Bishops in June 1688. The charge was seditious libel, in presenting to the King a petition against the enforcement of his second Declaration of Indulgence. The acquittal of the Bishops was a disastrous blow to the Crown's prestige, and Powys was heavily criticised for incompetence: inexplicably he forgot to adduce evidence that the Petition had ever been presented, so that the trial almost collapsed at the outset. However, given the immense public sympathy for the Bishops, and that two of the four judges directed the jury to acquit, it is unlikely that any prosecutor could have secured a conviction.

=== Parliamentary career ===
Powys was removed from office after the Glorious Revolution in 1688, and built up a lucrative private practice at the bar. He acquired a reputation for fairness, especially in defence of state prisoners, among whom was Sir John Fenwick, 3rd Baronet, and at the bar of both houses of parliament.

Powys was returned as Member of Parliament for Ludlow at the first general election of 1701. At the second general election of 1701, he was returned again for Ludlow, and also stood unsuccessfully at Cardigan Boroughs. After the accession of Anne, he was made Prime serjeant in June 1702. At the 1702 English general election, he was returned for both Ludlow and Truro and opted to remain at Ludlow. He was involved in Tory groupings, but by 1704 was generally supporting the court. He was returned again at the 1705 English general election. He remained neutral over the choice of Speaker in October 1705 on the regency bill but spoke on the Court side on the Regency bill in December and January 1706 and voted against the ‘place clause’ on 18 February 1706. In 1707 he was appointed recorder of Ludlow, holding the post until 1719. When Harley resigned from the Administration in February 1708, Powys joined the opposition. He was returned as a Tory for Ludlow at the 1708 British general election. He voted against the impeachment of Dr Henry Sacheverell in 1710, and on 7 May 1710 presented an address to the Queen from the corporation of Ludlow in favour of Sacheverell. At the 1710 British general election he was returned again for Ludlow. He was one of the ‘worthy patriots’ who exposed the mismanagement of the previous ministry. He had been agitating Lord Harley for preferment since the Tory administration was formed and was rewarded on 8 June 1713 with the post of judge of the Queen's Bench but as he and his brother, Sir Littleton Powys, too frequently formed judgments in opposition to the rest of the court, he, as the more active and able of the two, was removed, on Lord-chancellor Cowper's advice, when George I of Great Britain came to England (1714). His position as King's Serjeant was restored to him after an appeal, and he held the position for the rest of his life. After 1713 he did not stand for parliament.

== Later life and legacy ==
Powys lived in London, where all his eight children were born and baptised at St Giles in the Fields, Holburn, prior to acquiring Lilford Hall in 1711, induced to inspect it by his friend, Sir Edward Ward. Powys is buried at Achurch. He died in London in 1719 and was temporarily held at St Giles in the Fields, Holburn, and was buried at Lilford, Northants and later moved to Thorp Achurch nearby. He was twice married: first to Sarah, daughter of Ambrose Holbech of Mollington, Warwickshire; and secondly, to Elizabeth, daughter of Sir Philip Meadows. He had issue with both; and his great-grandson Thomas Powys, was created Lord Lilford in 1797. His portrait hangs at the Tarlton Law Library, University of Texas at Austin.

Parliament of England
Preceded by Francis Herbert; Thomas Newport	Member of Parliament for Ludlow; 1701–1707; With: William Gower1701; Francis Herbert 1701-1705; Acton Baldwyn 1705-1707	Succeeded by Parliament of Great Britain
Parliament of Great Britain
Preceded by Parliament of England	Member of Parliament for Ludlow; 1707–1713; With: Acton Baldwyn	Succeeded by Humphrey Walcot; Acton Baldwyn
