= Achurch =

Village in Northamptonshire, England

Coordinates: 52.43545°N 0.49957°W

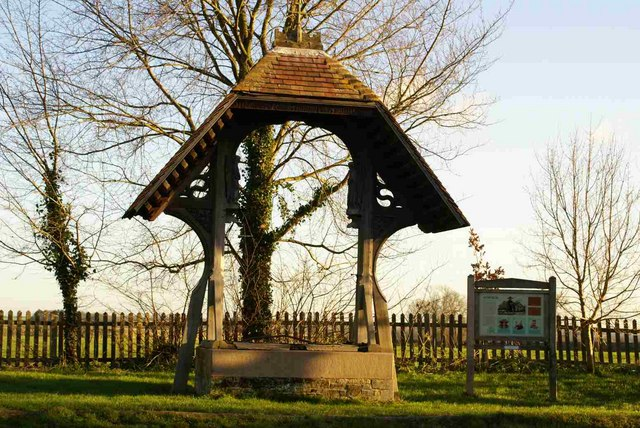
- The elaborate cover for the village well

- Location within Northamptonshire
- Population: 188 (Thorpe Achurch parish, 2021)
- OS grid reference: TL021830
- Civil parish: Thorpe Achurch
- Unitary authority: North Northamptonshire
- Ceremonial county: Northamptonshire
- Region: East Midlands
- Country: England
- Sovereign state: United Kingdom
- Post town: PETERBOROUGH
- Postcode district: PE8
- Police: Northamptonshire
- Fire: Northamptonshire
- Ambulance: East Midlands

Achurch is a village in the civil parish of Thorpe Achurch in the North Northamptonshire district of Northamptonshire, England. The village is situated on a small rise above the River Nene, and lies 5 miles (8 km) south of the market town of Oundle. As well as Achurch, the parish also includes the village of Thorpe Waterville and surrounding rural areas. At the 2021 census the parish had a population of 188. It shares a grouped parish council with the neighbouring parish of Lilford-cum-Wigsthorpe.

The parish includes the Grade II* listed Church of St. John the Baptist, an early and late 13th-century Anglican church restored and enlarged by architect William Slater in 1862.

== History ==
The village's name means 'Asa's church' or 'Asi's church'.

Settled successively since the Iron Age the village was named after the site of the nearby church as 'Aas-kirk’, meaning Church by the Water. The village was recorded in the Domesday Book of 1086 as Asechirce, when the land was held mainly by Ascelin de Waterville, a Norman knight. Ownership of the land passed through the Dukes of Exeter in the 14th century with Henry VII granting them to his mother Lady Margaret Beaufort. On her death the two manors of Thorpe Waterville and Achurch remained the property of the Crown until Henry VIII granted them to his illegitimate son Henry FitzRoy.

Edward VI awarded the manors to Sir William Cecil, later Lord Burghley, and they remained in the possession of his descendants the Earls of Exeter, until 1773, when the estates were sold to Thomas Powys of Lilford. Thomas Powys’ grandson was raised to the peerage as the first Lord Lilford in 1797.

The neighbouring village of Lilford was largely cleared in the 18th century to make way for a larger park for Lilford Hall. In 1778 the parish of Lilford (also known as Lilford-cum-Wigsthorpe) was united for ecclesiastical purposes with Thorpe Achurch. Material from Lilford's demolished parish church was used both to restore the church at Achurch and to erect a folly nearby.

Although Lilford became part of the ecclesiastical parish of Thorpe Achurch in 1778, it continued to exist as a parish for civil purposes, including the collection of tithes and administering the poor laws.

== Governance ==
There are two tiers of local government covering Thorpe Achurch, at parish and unitary authority level: Lilford Wigsthorpe Thorpe Achurch Parish Council and North Northamptonshire Council. The parish council is a grouped parish council, covering the two civil parishes of Lilford-cum-Wigsthorpe and Thorpe Achurch. Although united ecclesiastically in 1778 and now sharing a parish council, they remain legally separate civil parishes.

== Notable people ==
- Robert Browne who had previously founded the Brownists, a forerunner of Congregationalism, was rector here from 1591 to 1631.
- William Peake – born in Achurch in 1603, became Lord Mayor of London in 1686.
- Edmund Quincy – ancestor of John Quincy Adams, sixth president of the United States, lived in the village prior to emigrating to America in 1633.

The village has lent its name to people's surnames who are believed to have originated from the village.
