= Thorpe Waterville Castle =

Castle in Thorpe Waterville, Northamptonshire, England

- Thorpe Waterville, Northamptonshire, England
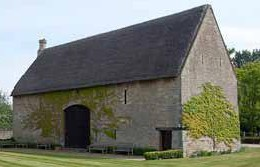

Site information
- Type: Fortified manor house
- Owner: The Venn family

Location
- Shown within Northamptonshire
- Coordinates: 52.4211°N 0.4986°W
- Grid reference: grid reference TL022814

Thorpe Waterville Castle was a medieval fortified manor house near Thorpe Waterville, Northamptonshire, England.

== Details ==
Thorpe Waterville Castle was built by Walter Langton, the bishop of Coventry and Lichfield, around 1300. The wood for the castle was stolen by Langton from the woods of a nearby abbey. The result was a luxurious fortified home. While owned by Lord Lovell, the castle was successfully besieged in early 1461 during the Wars of the Roses.

The hall of the castle was later converted into a barn, and still survives in this form, complete with a distinctive 14th-century chimney. Today, the remains of castle have scheduled monument status and a grade I listed building.

== See also ==
- Castles in Great Britain and Ireland
- List of castles in England

== Bibliography ==
- Mackenzie, James D. (1896) The Castles of England: Their Story and Structure, Vol I. New York: Macmillan.
- Pettifer, Adrian. (2002) English Castles: a Guide by Counties. Woodbridge, UK: Boydell Press. ISBN 978-0-85115-782-5.
