= Deene =

Village in Northamptonshire, England

Coordinates: 52.5221°N 0.6055°W

- Location within Northamptonshire
- OS grid reference: SP9492
- Unitary authority: North Northamptonshire
- Ceremonial county: Northamptonshire
- Region: East Midlands
- Country: England
- Sovereign state: United Kingdom
- Post town: Corby
- Postcode district: NN17
- Dialling code: 01780
- Police: Northamptonshire
- Fire: Northamptonshire
- Ambulance: East Midlands
- UK Parliament: Corby and East Northamptonshire

Deene is a small village and civil parish near Deenethorpe and Bulwick in North Northamptonshire. It has a village hall, and notable buildings include the redundant St Peter's Church, and the manor of Deene Park.

The village's name means 'Valley'.
