= Church of St. John the Baptist, Achurch =

Church in Achurch, Northamptonshire

Coordinates: 52°26′12″N 0°29′56″W

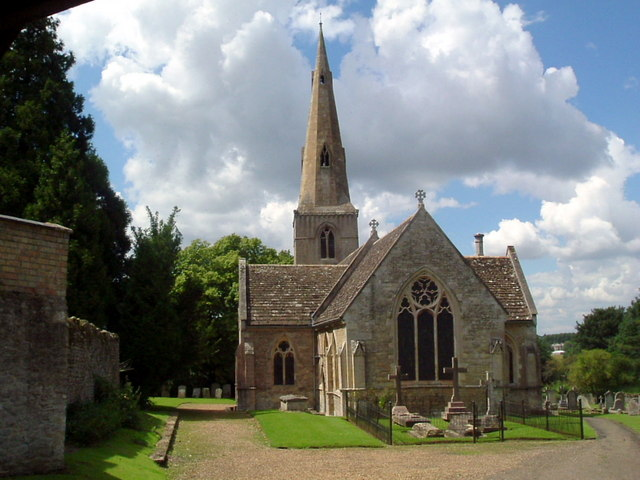
- Church of St. John the Baptist, Achurch
- Denomination: Church of England

History
- Dedication: St Andrew

Administration
- Diocese: Peterborough
- Parish: Achurch

Clergy
- Vicar: Carolyn Brawn

The Church of St. John the Baptist is a Grade II* listed church in Achurch, Northamptonshire.

The adjacent rectory dates from 1633. The church dates from around the early 13th century. The church was rebuilt by Sir Ascelin de Waterville upon his return from the Third Crusade.
