= Lilford Hall =

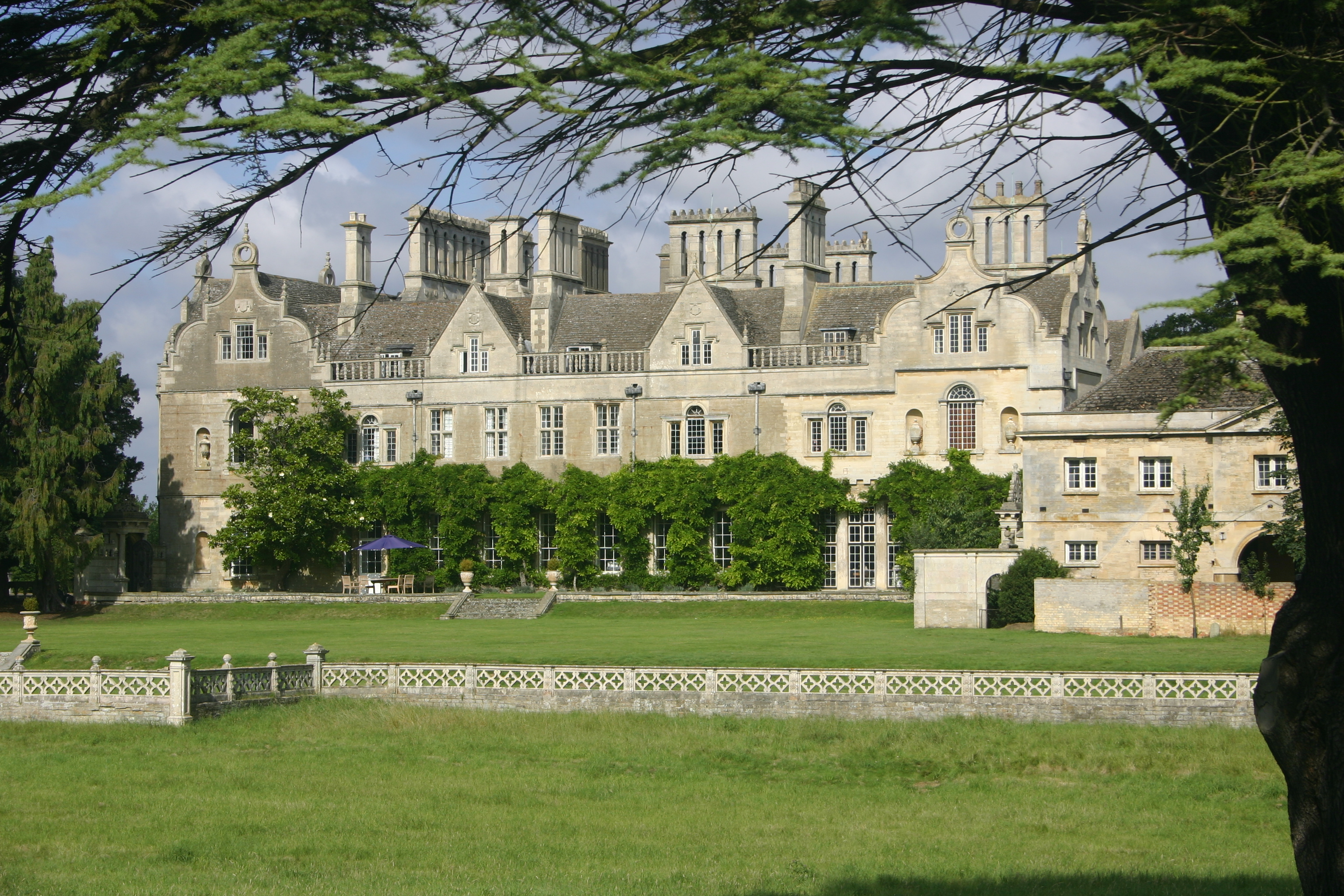
- South facade of Lilford Hall
- Interactive map of the Lilford Hall area

General information
- Type: Grade I listed
- Architectural style: Jacobean exterior (Georgian interior)
- Location: Lilford, Lilford-cum-Wigsthorpe, England
- Coordinates: 52.4451°N 0.4868°W
- Construction started: 1495
- Completed: c. 1740
- Client: Williams Elmes (the elder), William Elmes (the younger) and 1st Lord Lilford

Technical details
- Structural system: Stone (Blisworth Limestone)

Design and construction
- Architect: Henry Flitcroft

Website
- http://www.lilfordhall.com

Lilford Hall is a Grade I listed Jacobean stately home at Lilford in Northamptonshire in the United Kingdom. The 100-room house is located in the eastern part of the county, south of Oundle and north of Thrapston.

== History ==
It was started in 1495 as a Tudor building, with a major Jacobean exterior extension added in 1635 and a Georgian interior adopted in the 1740s, having 32,406 sq ft (3,010.6 m^{2}) of floor area.

The Hall was originally part of Lord Burghley's estate, then the Powys family (Baron Lilford) from 1711 to 1990. Lilford Hall and the associated parkland of 350 acres (1.4 km^{2}) is specifically located along the River Nene for around a mile, and north-west of the village of Lilford, part of the parish of Lilford-cum-Wigsthorpe. The land which was turned into the parkland was mentioned in the Domesday Book, and owned by King David I of Scotland at that time.

The Manor of Lilford was acquired in 1473 by William Browne a wealthy wool merchant and landowner from Stamford, from the estate of Baron Welles who was beheaded by King Edward IV for treason. William Browne passed on the Manor of Lilford to his only child Elizabeth in 1489, and the Hall in a Tudor style was built in 1495 by William Elmes (the elder) who was Elizabeth's son.

The Hall was thereafter acquired for the Powys family in 1711 by Sir Thomas Powys who was Attorney General to King James II, and the chief prosecutor at the famous trial of the Seven Bishops. Alterations were made in the 18th century by the architect Henry Flitcroft for his grandson Thomas Powys. His son, Thomas Powys, was created the first Baron Lilford by the Prime Minister, William Pitt the Younger.

The main exterior of Lilford Hall is a Jacobean-style gentry house of the 1630s built by William Elmes (the younger) in 1635, related closely with Thorpe masons through its parallels with other neighbouring houses such as Kirby Hall and Apethorpe Palace. Its plan is traditional and arranged around a 'U-shaped' court with the hall entered by a screens passage, the Great Chamber placed over the hall, leading to the principal apartment that terminated with the Great Bed-chamber.

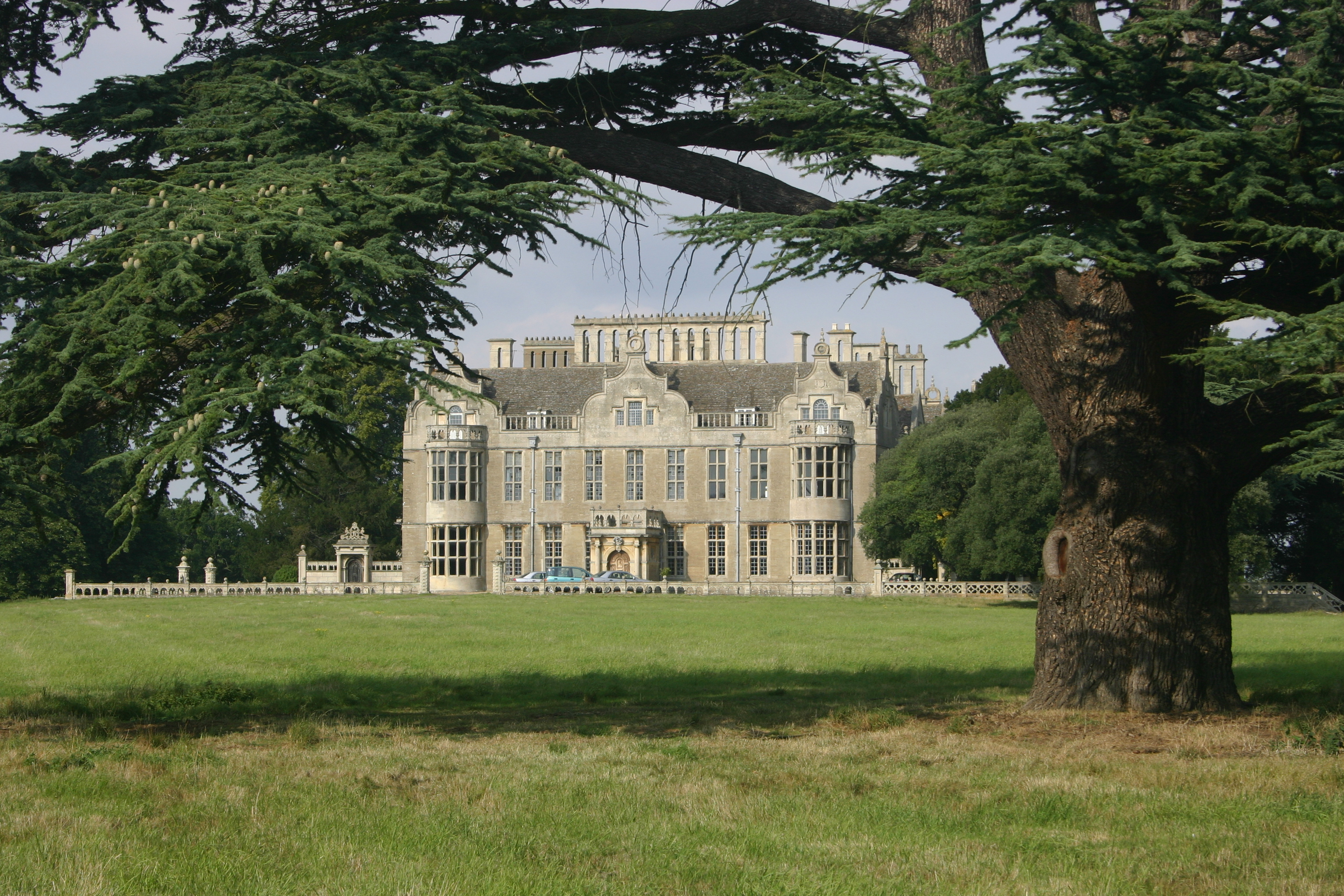
West facade of Lilford Hall

Its development by successive generations of the Powys family, who acquired the property in 1711, respected the old house, but each stage has a clarity that is clearly legible and contributes to the whole. Apart from the construction of the pair of balancing stable wings by Henry Flitcroft and the successive addition of small-scale extensions in the form of additional storeys to the east end of the two wings, works were confined to alterations within the house and remodelling.

The Jacobean house is considered as of considerable significance, and Flitcroft's Georgian alterations in the 1740s are of a similar status. The outstanding contribution is that of Flitcroft in the c 1740s with his insertion of a comprehensive set of 18th-century interiors that not only transformed the principal rooms into a sequence of Palladian spaces, but brought light into the heart of the building. The play of the sequence of 18th-century rooms within the structure of the Jacobean house is one of the most notable features of the house.

The play between these 18th-century interiors and the Jacobean exterior is a major feature of Lilford Hall. The alterations of the early 19th century are of some significance as are William Gilbee Habershon's work in the 1840s. However, the latter was primarily concerned with the exterior and the integration of the garden with the house. Of more significance is the extension of the house in 1909 by William Dunn and Robert Watson of Dunn & Watson whose proposals extended the north and south ranges in an imaginative way reminiscent of other Scottish architects such as Sir Robert Stodart Lorimer.

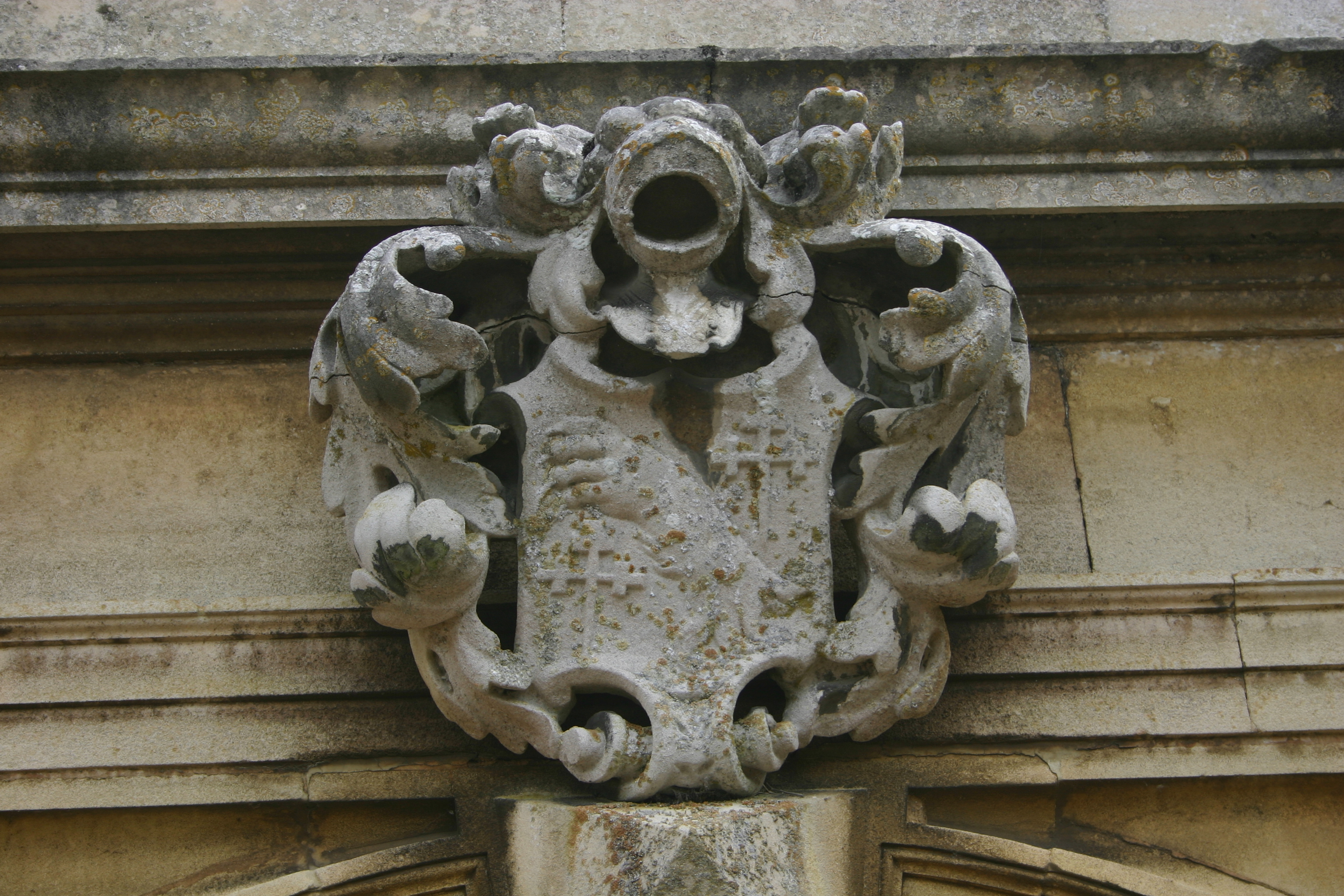
Sir Thomas Powys' coat of arms over front porch

The significance of the house is enhanced by its association with firstly Thomas Powys who was created 1st Baron Lilford in acknowledgement of his role as a politician between 1774 and 1794, secondly the 3rd Baron Lilford who was a Lord of the Bedchamber to King William IV from 1831 to 1837 and then Lord-in-Waiting (government whip in the House of Lords) in the Whig administration of the 2nd Viscount Melbourne from 1837 to 1841, and finally through the association of the parkland with ornithological pursuits, particularly those of the 4th Baron Lilford.

The relationship of the Hall to its setting is also notable, particularly because of the integration of the house with the pleasure grounds and deer park. Lilford Park was formalised between 1747 and 1776 by Flitcroft by removing all of the existing village (12 houses and the vicarage) as well as St Peter's Church, which buildings were all located south of the Hall. The remains of the church were then used to build a folly near the Achurch end of the Park.

At present, Lilford Park comprises pleasure grounds surrounding the Hall of around 100 acres to the west of the Park, a former deer park of also around 100 acres to the north of the Park, and woods of 150 acres to the east and south of the Park.

The Park also still contains several aviaries built for Thomas Powys, 4th Baron Lilford, a prominent ornithologist. The 7th Baron Lilford restocked the aviaries around 1970, containing more than 350 birds of 110 species, and opened the Park to the public.

In the autumn of 1990 Lilford Park was closed to the public, and the Hall and Park was owned from 2004 to 2022 by the Micklewright family and used by them as a private residence. The Lilford family own Bank Hall in Lancashire, which featured on the first series of the BBC's Restoration series in 2003.

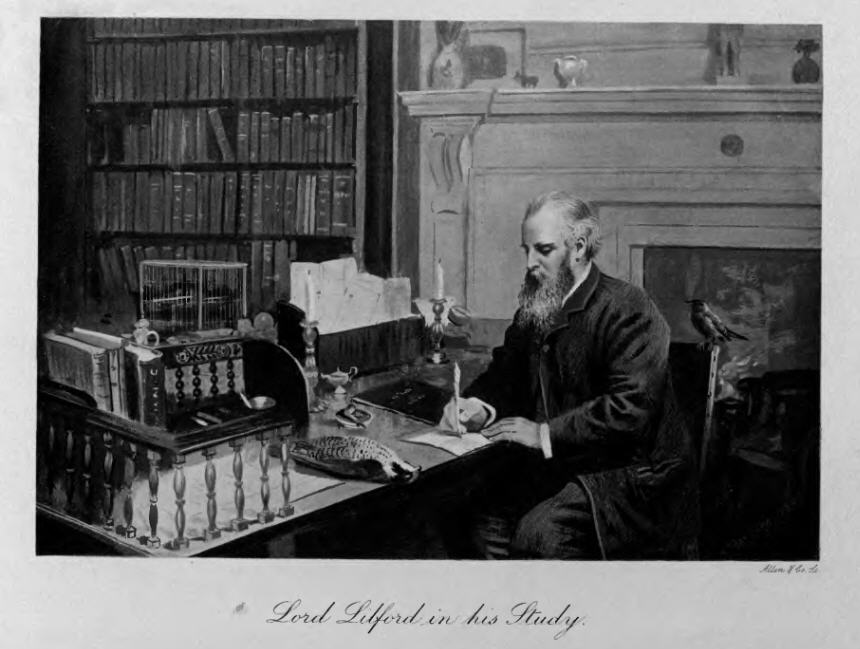
Thomas Powys, 4th Baron Lilford, in the Library at Lilford Hall

The 4th Baron Lilford was a founder of the British Ornithologists' Union in 1858 and its president from 1867 until his death. He was also the first president of the Northamptonshire Natural History Society. Lilford travelled widely, especially in the Mediterranean Region and his extensive collection of birds was maintained in the grounds of Lilford Hall. His aviaries featured birds from around the globe, including rheas, kiwis, pink-headed ducks and even a pair of free-flying lammergeiers. He was responsible for the introduction of the little owl into England in the 1880s.

During the Second World War Lilford Hall served as nurses' quarters for USAAF 303rd Station Hospital which was in the park. After the war, the former hospital buildings in the park were used for a Polish school called Lilford Technical School from 1949 and 1954.

The hall and park was the subject of the 27 January 1900 issue of Country Life Illustrated, and also a location for the BBC television series By the Sword Divided made in the 1980s. In 1969, erotic artist Penny Slinger used the hall in one of her best-known works.

Lilford Hall was listed as Grade I in 1967; associated buildings and features are Grade II. The house remains on Historic England's Heritage at Risk Register; graded as C - slow decay, in a poor condition. Some repairs have been carried out, but further works, notably to the roofs and stables, are required.

Lilford Hall was placed for sale in June 2020 for £10 million. A report by Country Life stated that the main house provided "comfortable living accommodation", but that "the rest of the 32,400sq ft house has been unoccupied for 50 years and now needs complete renovation, as do the Georgian pavilions ... and various historic outbuildings". In June 2021 the asking price was lowered to £7.5 million.

== Gallery ==
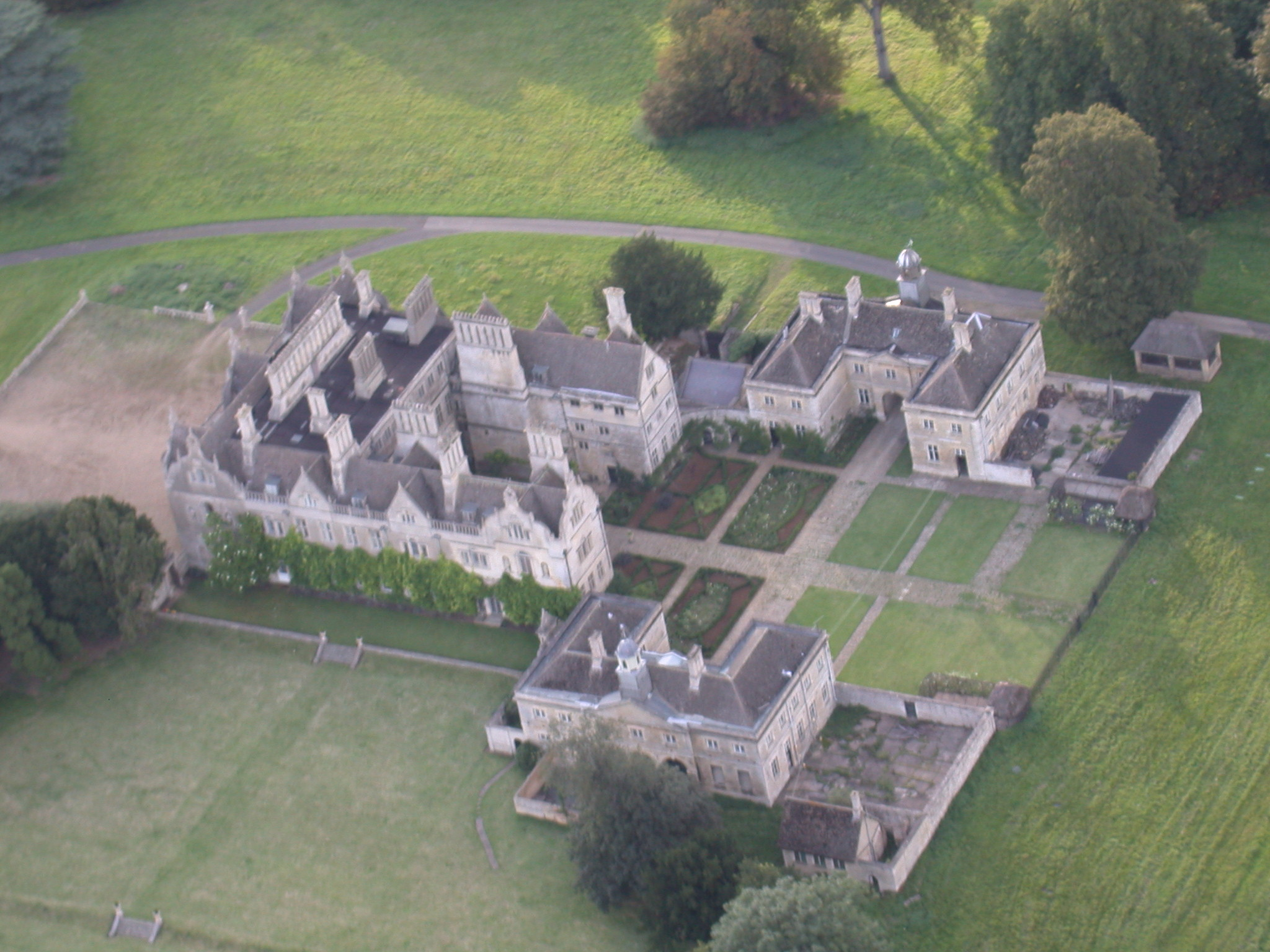
Air view of South facade of Lilford Hall

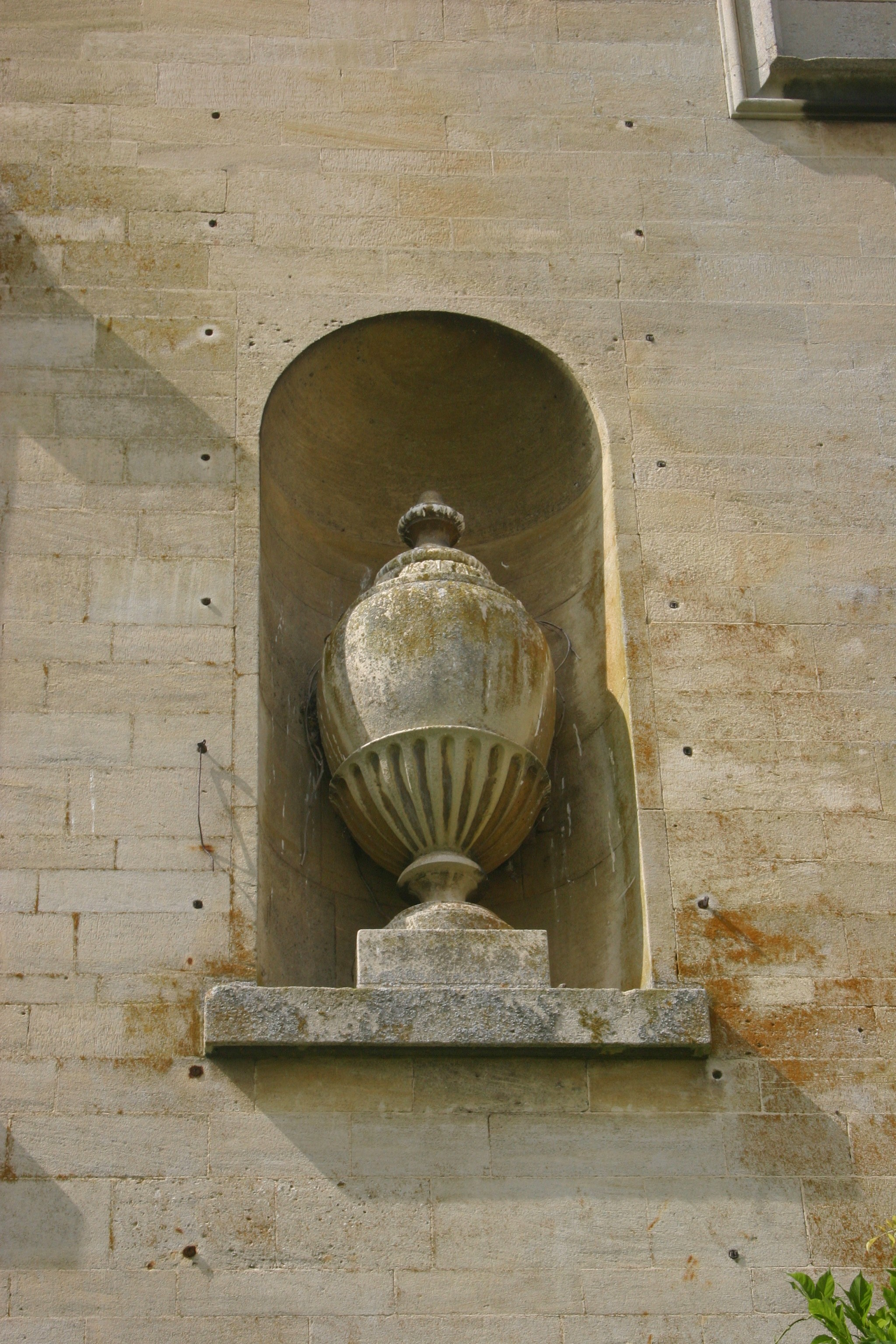
Stone vase on South Facade

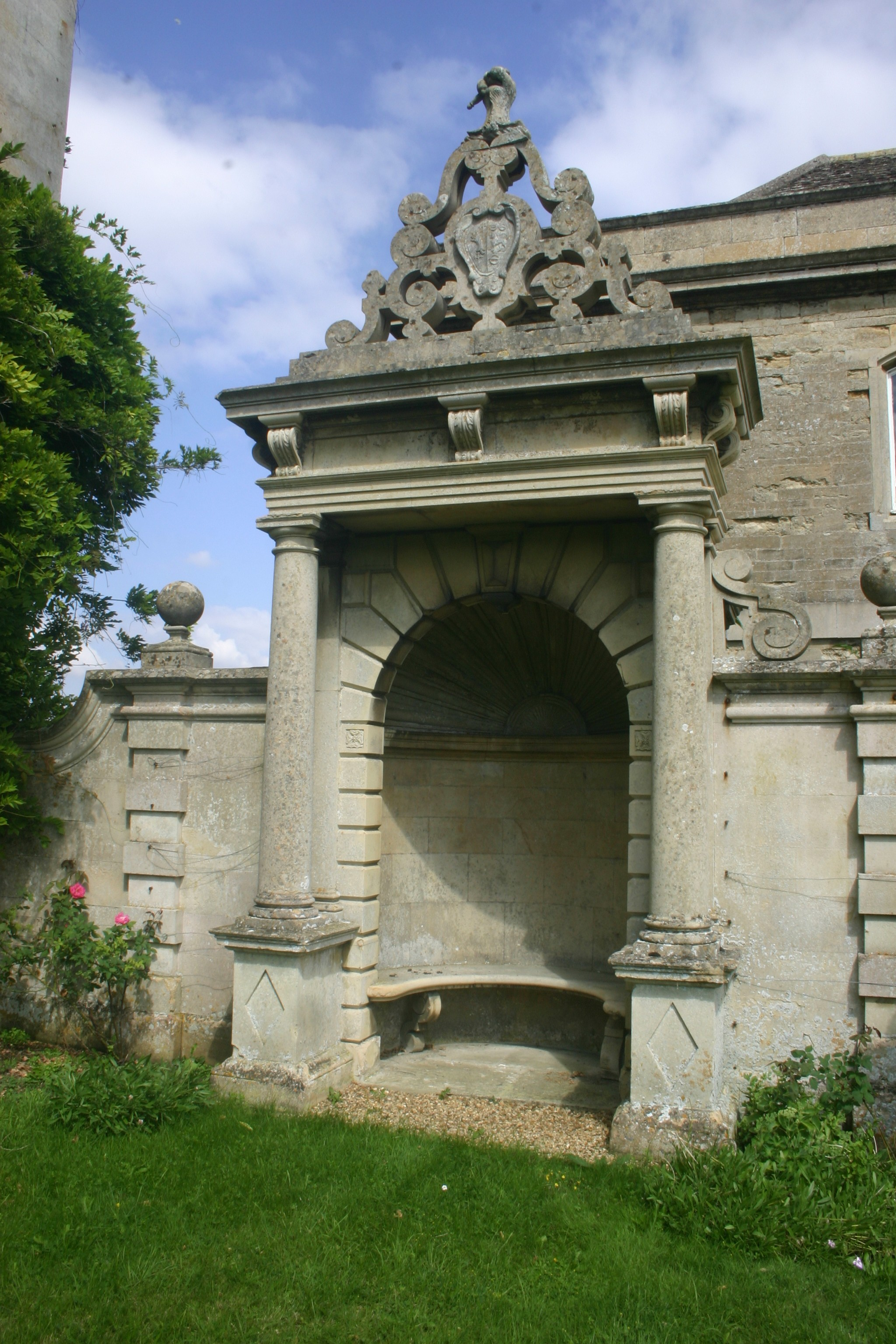
Garden seat on South Terrace

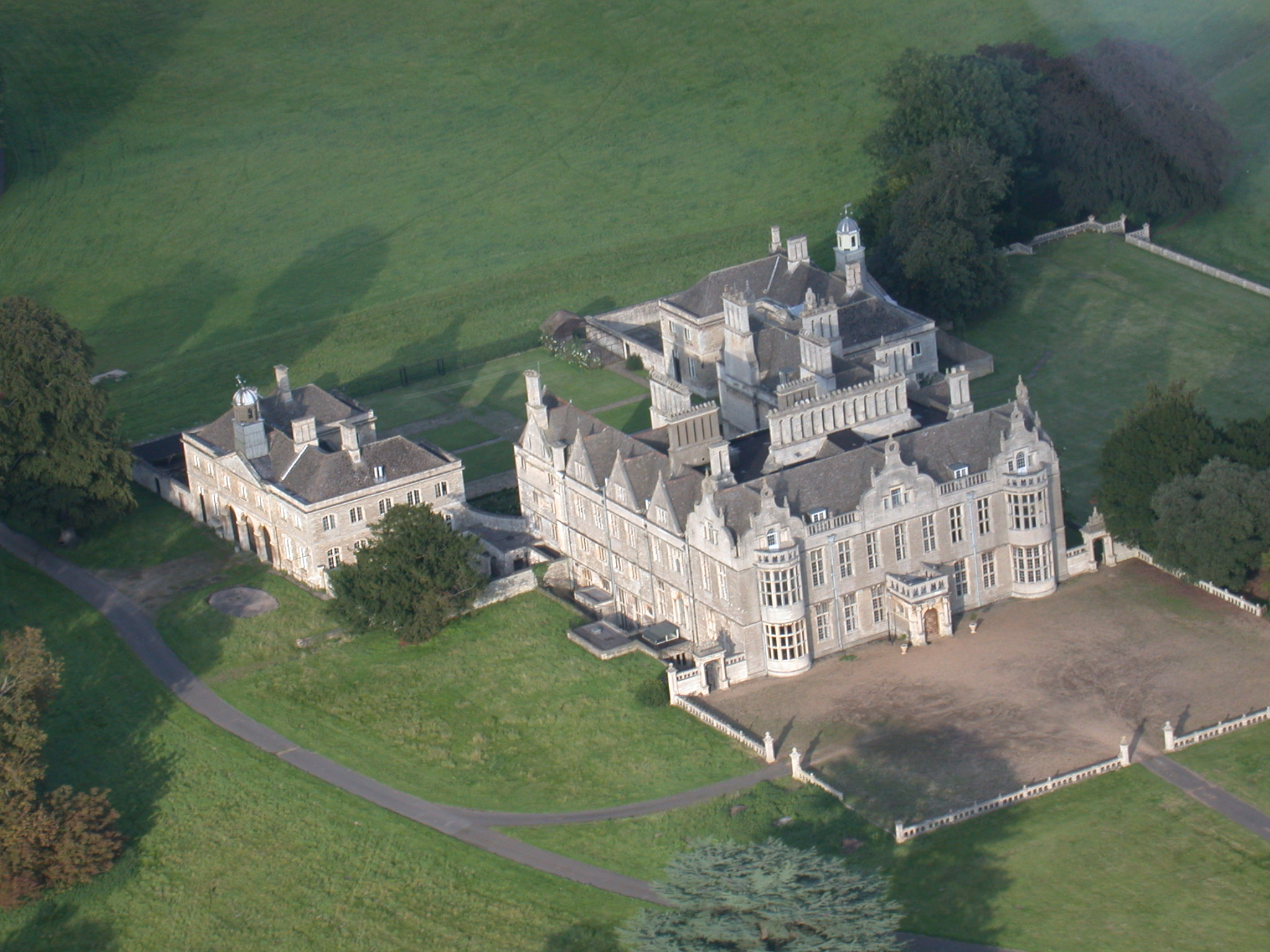
View of North and West facades of Lilford Hall

== Bibliography ==
- Heward, John and Taylor, Robert The Country Houses of Northamptonshire ISBN 1-873592-21-3
- Thomas Babington Macaulay (1st Baron Macaulay), Macaulay's History of England Chapter VIII
- Pevsner, Nikolaus, The Buildings of England – Northamptonshire ISBN 0-300-09632-1
- Inskip, Peter "Lilford Hall Conservation Statement" Peter Inskip and Peter Jenkins Architects
- A History of the County of Northampton: Volume 3 (1930), 'Parishes: Lilford-with-Wigsthorpe', pp. 227–231.
