= Wigsthorpe =

Hamlet in Northamptonshire, England

Coordinates: 52.430°N 0.464°W

- Location within Northamptonshire
- OS grid reference: TL045825
- Civil parish: Lilford-cum-Wigsthorpe
- Unitary authority: North Northamptonshire
- Ceremonial county: Northamptonshire
- Region: East Midlands
- Country: England
- Sovereign state: United Kingdom
- Post town: PETERBOROUGH
- Postcode district: PE8
- Dialling code: 01832
- Police: Northamptonshire
- Fire: Northamptonshire
- Ambulance: East Midlands
- UK Parliament: Corby and East Northamptonshire

Wigsthorpe is a hamlet in the civil parish of Lilford-cum-Wigsthorpe in the North Northamptonshire district of Northamptonshire, England. It lies to the south of the town of Oundle and the village of Barnwell.

Attested in 1232 as Wykingethorp, the name is believed to mean "Outlying farmstead or hamlet of a man called Vikingr".
