= Willow Brook (River Nene) =

River in Northamptonshire, England

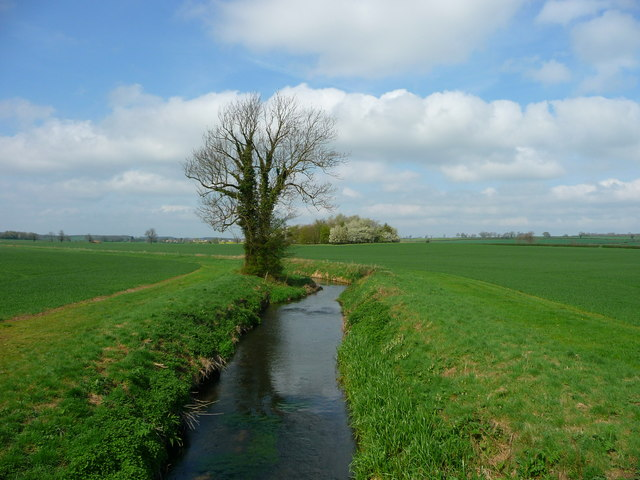
- Willow Brook near Fotheringhay

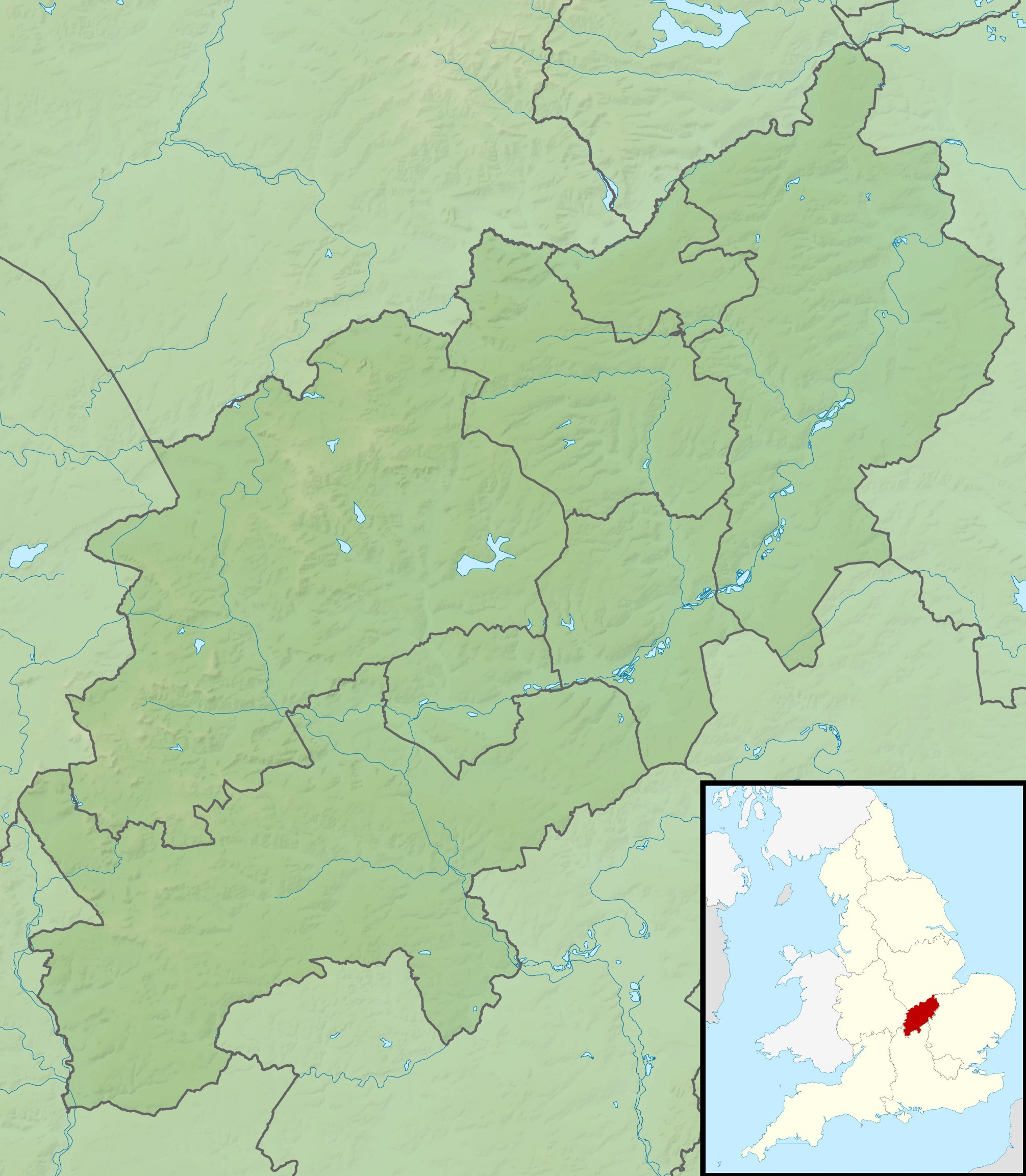
- Location of the mouth within Northamptonshire

Location
- Country: England
- County: Northamptonshire

Physical characteristics
- Source
  - location: Corby
- Mouth: River Nene
  - location: Fotheringhay
  - coordinates: 52.532649°N 0.408065°W
  - elevation: 17 m (56 ft)
- Basin size: 96.2 km^{2} (37.1 sq mi)

Basin features
- River system: River Nene
- Tributaries
  - left: Gretton Brook

The Willow Brook is a tributary of the River Nene. Its entire course is in the English county of Northamptonshire.

The Willow Brook rises north of Corby where, until 1980, water was extracted for use at Corby Steelworks. It then flows through or near Deene, Bulwick, Blatherwycke, King's Cliffe and Woodnewton and joins the Nene downstream from Fotheringhay.

In the early 1970s, a spate of pollution incidents left the river with high levels of zinc sulphate leading to the eradication of the stone loach population within the watercourse.
