= Blatherwycke =

Village in Northamptonshire, England

Coordinates: 52.5486°N 0.5636°W

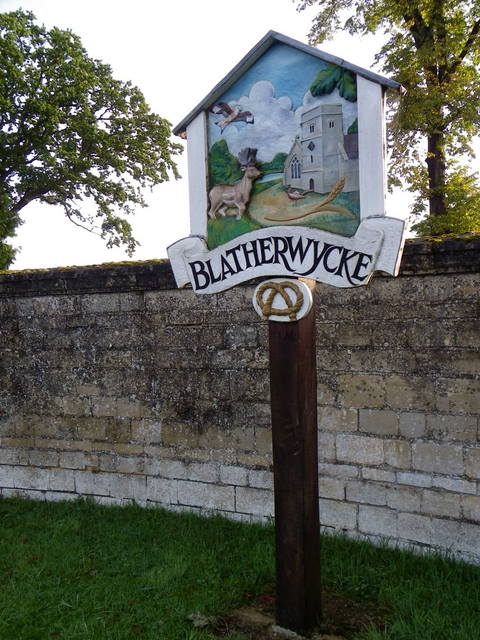
- Village sign

- Location within Northamptonshire
- OS grid reference: SP9795
  - London: 78 miles (126 km) SSE
- Unitary authority: North Northamptonshire
- Ceremonial county: Northamptonshire
- Region: East Midlands
- Country: England
- Sovereign state: United Kingdom
- Post town: PETERBOROUGH
- Postcode district: PE8
- Dialling code: 01780
- Police: Northamptonshire
- Fire: Northamptonshire
- Ambulance: East Midlands
- UK Parliament: Corby and East Northamptonshire

Blatherwycke is a village and civil parish in North Northamptonshire, England. It is about 6 miles (10 km) north-east of Corby. It is near Blatherwycke Lake, on the Willow Brook.

== Demographics ==
The population is grouped with the nearby village of Laxton for administrative purposes. The 2001 census reports the population total, with Laxton, as 160 (68 male, 98 female) of which 55 live in Blatherwycke. At the 2011 census the population was included in the civil parish of Bulwick.

== History ==
The name was recorded in the Domesday Book of 1086 under "Blarewiche". It has several possible explanations including "bladder-plant specialised-farm", a form of the name "blackthorn" or "settlement where bladderwort grows".

Blatherwyke Hall was built in 1720 by Thomas Ripley, and the philanthropist Mary Jane Kinnaird was born there. The hall fell derelict and was demolished in 1948. A large stable building survives with the inscription "D, OB 1770" for Donatus O'Brien.

Holy Trinity Church is Norman in origin. There is a monument to Sir Humphrey Stafford (d.1575), the builder of Kirby Hall, and also Thomas Randolph (d.1635), the poet and dramatist commissioned by Sir Christopher Hatton.

== In popular culture ==
The village was immortalized in song by the comic Graham Fellows as John Shuttleworth.
