= 303 Station Hospital (Lilford Hall) =

War hospital in Northamptonshire, England

The 303rd Station Hospital was a World War II hospital established in the grounds of Lilford Hall in Northamptonshire, England in September 1943 as a 750-bed hospital to provide medical attention to wounded men returning from combat. The hospital was expanded to a 1,500-bed hospital after D-day. The original commanding officer was Major Thompson followed by Colonels Smith, Abramson and Ragan. Seventy-five nurses had accommodations at the nearby Lilford Hall. The hospital was disbanded in May 1945.
