= The Glebe (Lower Hutt) =

Historic house in Wellington Region, New Zealand

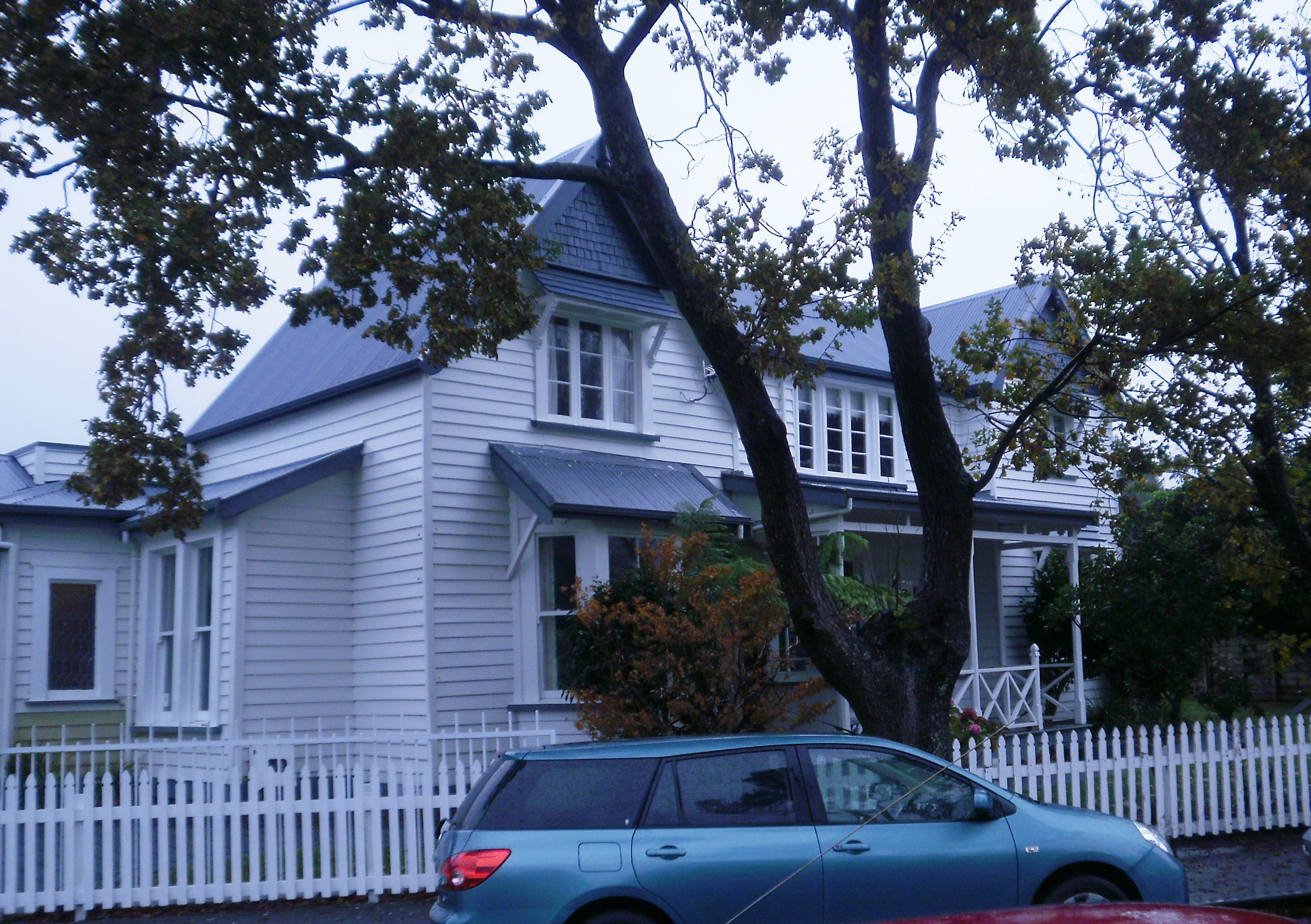
- Interactive map of the The Glebe area

General information
- Type: House
- Architectural style: Victorian
- Location: Boulcott, Lower Hutt, Wellington Region, New Zealand
- Coordinates: 41°12′8.05″S 174°55′23.35″E
- Completed: 1856

Design and construction
- Architect: William Corbett
- Other designers: Frederick de Jersey Clere

Heritage New Zealand – Category 1
- Official name: The Glebe
- Designated: 1986
- Reference no.: 4144

The Glebe is probably the oldest surviving house in the Hutt Valley, New Zealand, and was the first vicarage to be built in the Hutt Valley. The building is classified as a "Category I" historic place by Heritage New Zealand.

Built in 1856 on land given to the Anglican church by Edward Gibbon Wakefield, the house was designed by William Corbett, a church warden for the Naenae district. At the turn of the 20th century a new vicarage was built, and the house was on sold to prominent Wellington architect Frederick de Jersey Clere. Clere renamed the house "The Glebe", which is an old term for land owned by the church. He also added on a southern wing extension to the house.

The building is a two-storey, timber weatherboard home with a gable roof - originally the roof was made from shingles. The window hoods aren't original, and an original exterior staircase has since been removed.
