= Deene Park =

Country manor north-east of Corby in the county of Northamptonshire, England

Coordinates: 52.524°N 0.601°W

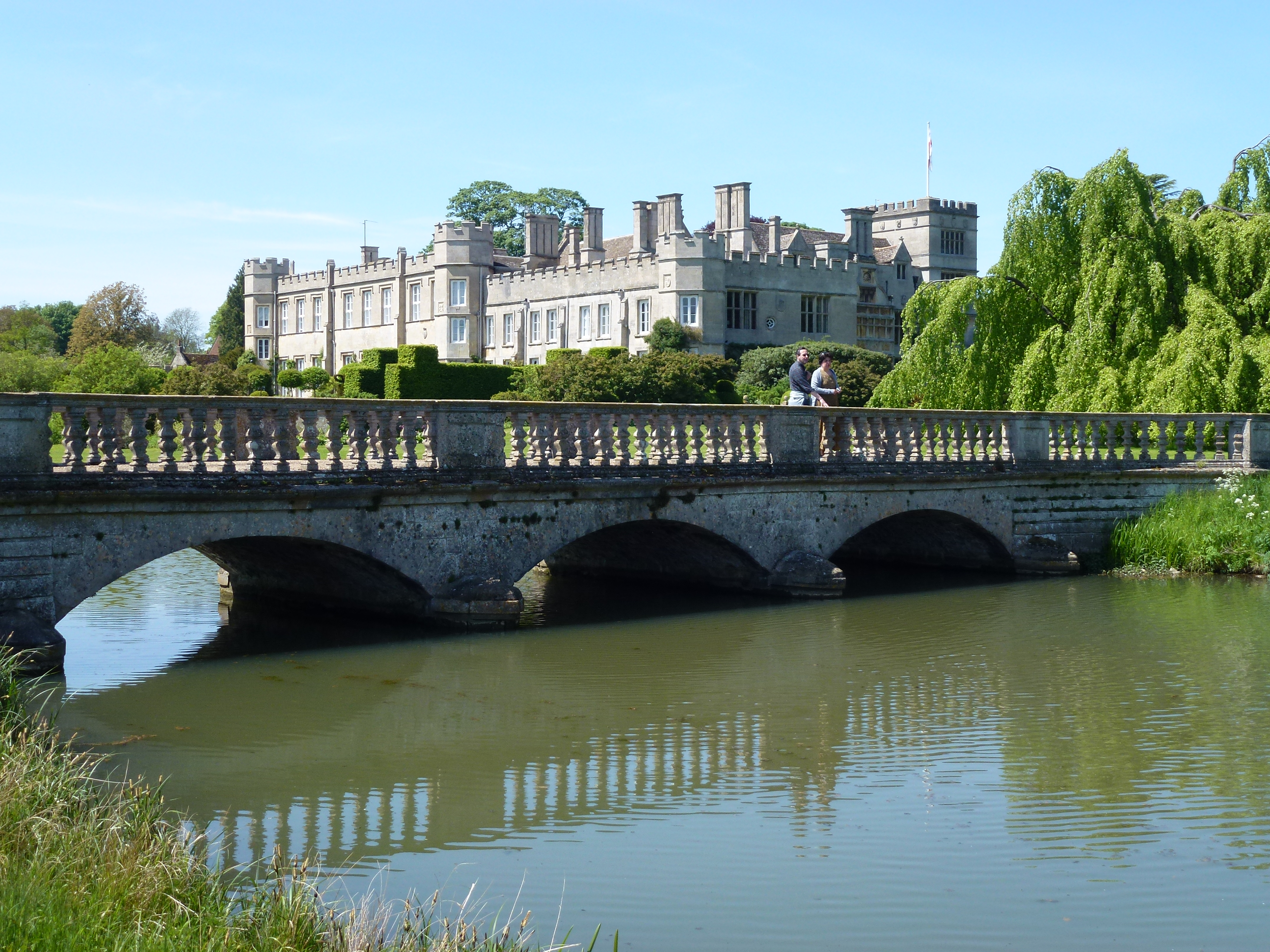
- Interactive map of Deene Park
- Type: Country house

History
- Built: 14th century, with later additions

Site notes
- Owner: Robert Brudenell (since 2014)
- Website: deenepark.com

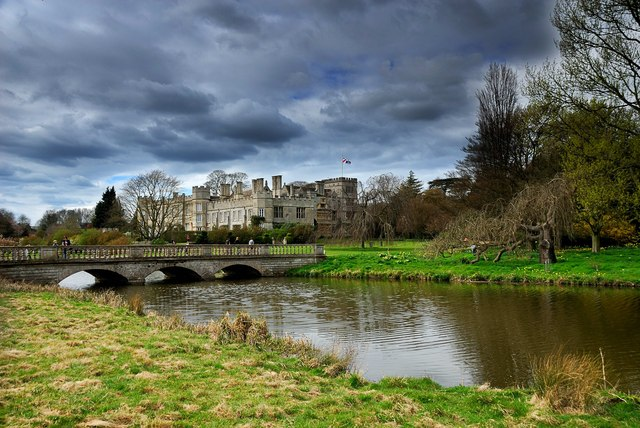
Deene Park from the south-east

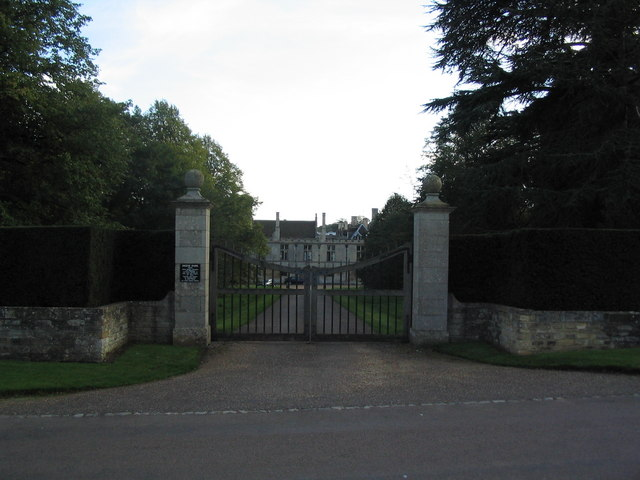
Gloomy view of the entrance gates

Deene Park, the seat of the Brudenell family since 1514, is a country manor located 5 miles (8 kilometres) north-east of Corby in the county of Northamptonshire, England. The hall itself is a Grade I listed building dating back to the 14th century which has been modified several times since then to create the current structure.

Seven of the Brudenell family were Earls of Cardigan – the most notable being the 7th Earl who led the Charge of the Light Brigade at the Battle of Balaclava (1854). The 7th Earl died childless in 1868, and while the Earldom of Cardigan merged with the Marquessate of Ailesbury, the Deene Park estate passed, after the death in 1915 of his widow, to the descendants of his second cousin Ernest Brudenell-Bruce, 3rd Marquess of Ailesbury.

The estate was inherited by its current owner, Robert Brudenell, in 2014; he is the son of Edmund and Marian Brudenell, who devoted their lives to the rehabilitation of Deene Park and are largely responsible for the estate's present appearance. They are descended from the 3rd Marquess's son Commodore Lord Robert Brudenell-Bruce RN. Lord Robert's son George, Edmund's father, inherited the family seat along with the family's remaining estates in Leicestershire and Northamptonshire, and reverted the family name back to "Brudenell" by Royal Licence.

== History ==
The manor of Deene belonged to Westminster Abbey; annual rent of £18 was paid until 1970. The manor house has been expanded around its courtyard from its sixteenth-century core, represented by its great hall, which was given its screen panelling and fireplace in 1571. The early 19th-century Bow Room contains the Brudenell library, collected in the 16th century by Sir Thomas Tresham and his son-in-law, Sir Thomas Brudenell, 1st Earl of Cardigan, though the collection no longer includes the manuscript of Chaucer's Canterbury Tales or the last copy of Magna Carta in private hands.

The house contains furnishings of different periods and portraits, including works by Joshua Reynolds and Thomas Gainsborough. Relics of the Crimean War include the uniforms of Lord Cardigan and the head and tail of his charger, Ronald.

The large gardens designed by David Nightingale Hicks feature a parterre overlooking the lake, and a newly planted avenue.

The manor is located in the countryside not far from the Harringworth Viaduct and is surrounded by historic villages and hamlets. St Peter's Church, Deene, in the grounds, has the funeral monuments of the Brudenells.

Throughout the 1990s, Deene Park hosted the annual August bank holiday Greenbelt Festival.
