= Lilford-cum-Wigsthorpe =

Civil parish in North Northamptonshire, England

Coordinates: 52.438°N 0.476°W

- Civil parish
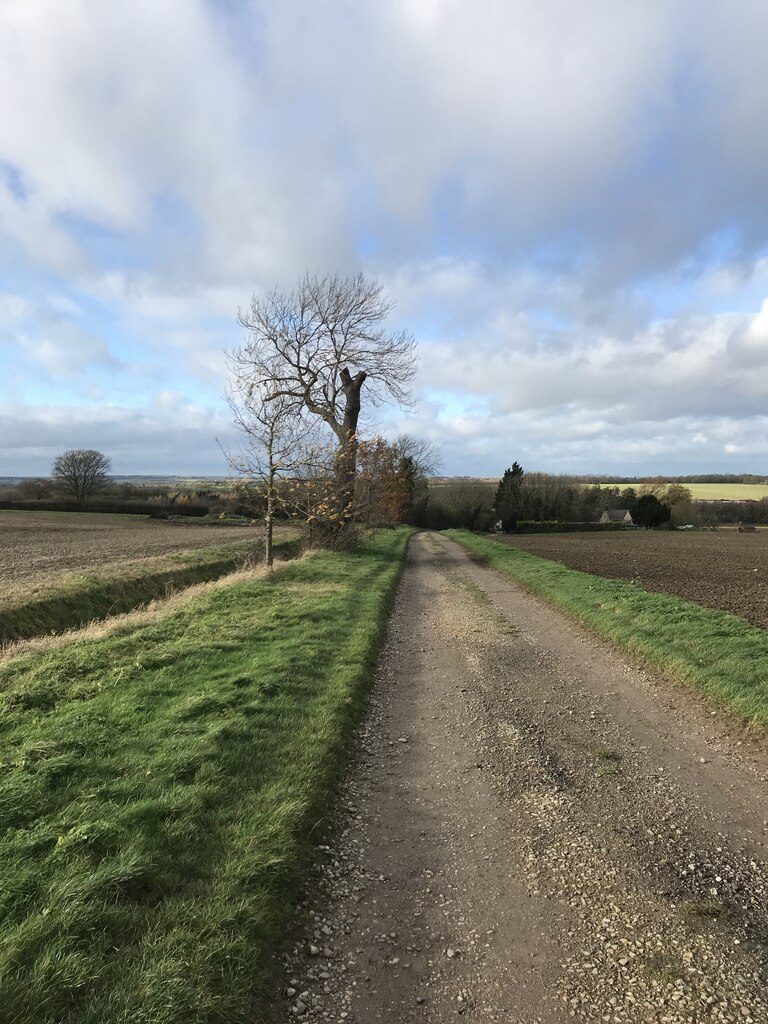
- Path near Wigsthorpe

- Location within Northamptonshire
- Population: 114 (Parish, 2021)
- Civil parish: Lilford-cum-Wigsthorpe
- Unitary authority: North Northamptonshire
- Ceremonial county: Northamptonshire
- Region: East Midlands
- Country: England
- Sovereign state: United Kingdom
- Post town: Peterborough
- Postcode district: PE8

Lilford-cum-Wigsthorpe is a civil parish in the North Northamptonshire district of Northamptonshire, England. The parish includes the hamlets of Lilford and Wigsthorpe and surrounding rural areas. It lies 3 miles (5 km) south of Oundle. Much of the northern part of the parish comprises the parkland and wider estate of Lilford Hall. At the 2021 census the parish had a population of 114. It shares a grouped parish council with the neighbouring parish of Thorpe Achurch.

== History ==
Lilford was historically a manor, being mentioned in the Domesday Book of 1086 as "Lilleforde".

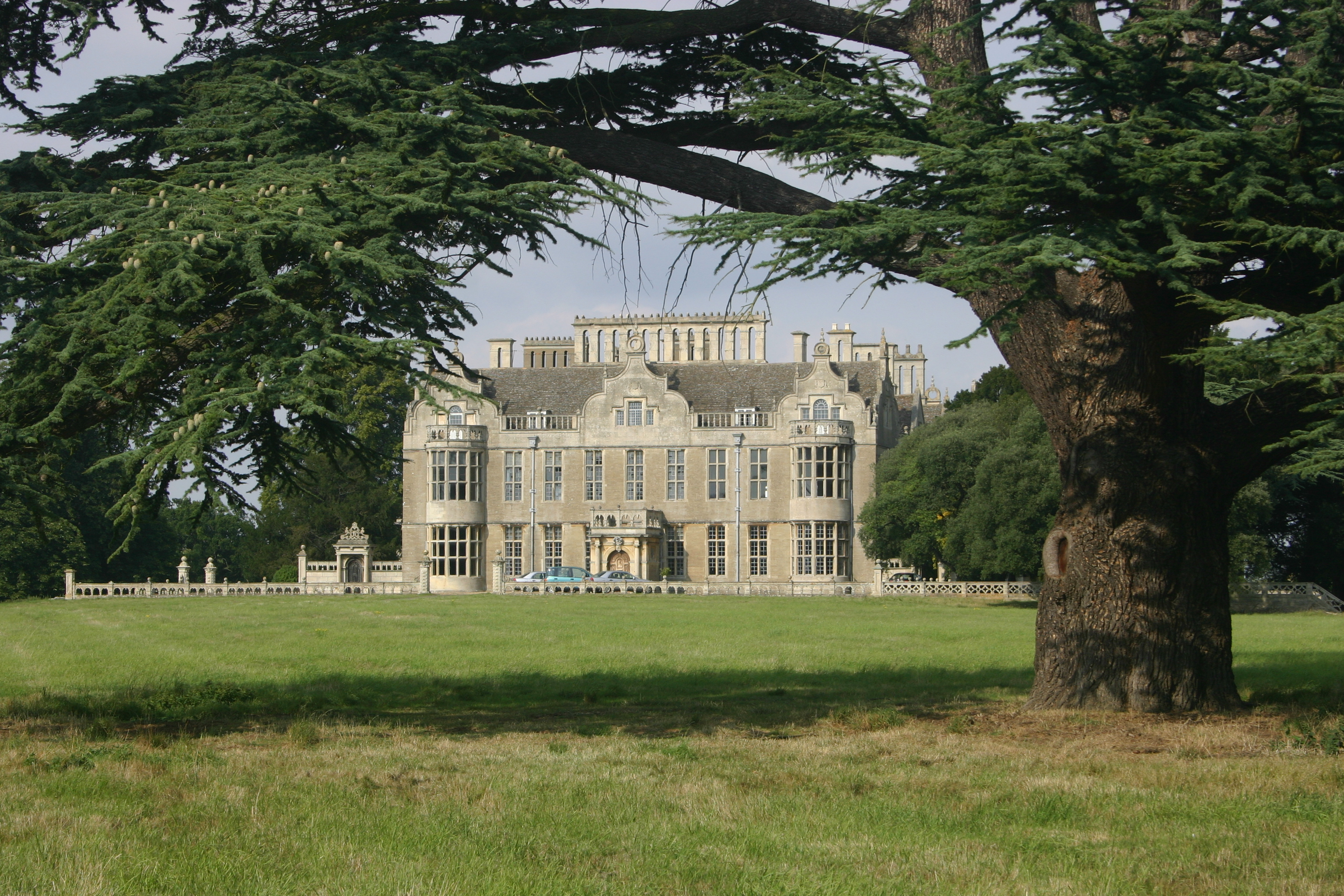
Lilford Hall

Lilford was an ancient parish in the Huxloe hundred of Northamptonshire. The parish church of St Peter and the village of Lilford stood at the north-western end of the parish, close to the River Nene. Lilford Hall was built in 1635, likely replacing an earlier manor house.

In 1755 the village was demolished by its landlord, Thomas Powys of Lilford Hall, to allow for creation of a larger park around the hall, a process known as emparkment. Some of the residents were rehoused at Wigsthorpe to the south-east, the other hamlet in the parish. A small replacement estate village of Lilford was also laid out on a new site to the south-east of the house, beyond the new parkland.

St Peter's Church stood immediately south-east of the house. The Powys family wanted to demolish it at the same time as clearing the village in 1755, but needed permission to do so from the Bishop of Peterborough. After initially proposing a replacement parish church at Wigsthorpe, where many of the villagers had been moved, it was eventually decided instead to unite the parish for ecclesiastical purposes with the neighbouring parish of Thorpe Achurch (also known as Achurch) to the west. An act of parliament was secured in 1778, allowing for the demolition of the church and the union of the two parishes for ecclesiastical purposes. Material from the demolished church was used both to restore the church at Achurch and to erect a folly nearby.

Although Lilford ceased to be an ecclesiastical parish in 1778 and lost its church, it continued to exist as a parish for civil purposes, including the collection of tithes and administering the poor laws. For such civil purposes, the parish came to be known as "Lilford-cum-Wigsthorpe", combining both the old name of the parish and the name of the other main hamlet in the parish.

== Governance ==
There are two tiers of local government covering Lilford-cum-Wigsthorpe, at parish and unitary authority level: Lilford Wigsthorpe Thorpe Achurch Parish Council and North Northamptonshire Council. The parish council is a grouped parish council, covering the two civil parishes of Lilford-cum-Wigsthorpe and Thorpe Achurch. Although united ecclesiastically in 1778 and now sharing a parish council, they remain legally separate civil parishes.
