= Holy Trinity Church, Blatherwycke =

Coordinates: 52.5510°N 0.5645°W

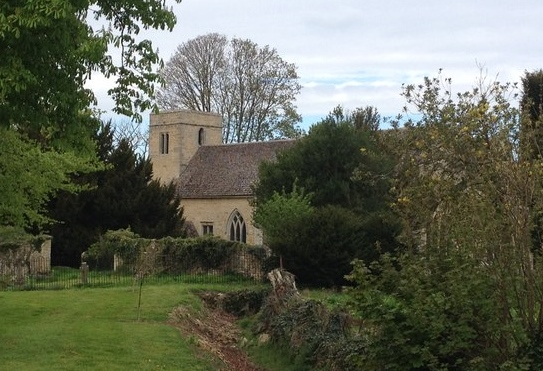

- Location in Northamptonshire
- OS grid reference: SP 974 957
- Location: Blatherwycke, Northamptonshire
- Country: England
- Denomination: Anglican
- Website: Churches Conservation Trust

Architecture
- Functional status: Redundant
- Heritage designation: Grade II*
- Designated: 23 May 1967
- Architectural type: Church
- Style: Norman, Gothic, Gothic Revival

Specifications
- Materials: Limestone, Collyweston stone slate roofs

Holy Trinity Church is a redundant Anglican church in the village of Blatherwycke, Northamptonshire, England. It is recorded in the National Heritage List for England as a designated Grade II* listed building, and is under the care of the Churches Conservation Trust. It stands in the grounds of the demolished Blatherwycke Hall.

== History ==
The church dates from the 11th century, and alterations and additions were made to it during the following three centuries. The tower was rebuilt in the early 17th century. The chancel was rebuilt in 1819 and later in the century the north aisle and north chapel were also rebuilt. The church was declared redundant on 1 November 1976, and was vested in the Churches Conservation Trust on 25 April 1978.

== Architecture ==
=== Exterior ===
Holy Trinity is constructed in limestone with Collyweston stone slate roofs. Its plan consists of a nave with a north aisle and a south porch, and a chancel with a north chapel, and a west tower. Its architecture includes Norman features, including the south doorway in the nave, the west doorway in the tower, a bell opening on the east side of the tower, the tower arch and the arcades. The tower is in three stages. The lowest stage contains a blocked, round-headed west door, and small windows on the north and south sides. There is a similar window on the west side in the middle stage. On each side of the top stage is a two-light bell opening. On the summit is a plain parapet with a single gargoyle on the north face. In the south wall of the chancel are two three-light windows with Decorated tracery, and a corbel table with carved heads. The chancel roof is gabled with a finial at the apex and pinnacles at the corners. The 19th-century east window has four lights and is flanked by buttresses. The east window in the chapel also dates from the 19th century, and has three lights. There is a similar window in the north wall of the chapel, and a priest's door. The chapel is gabled with a finial at the apex. In the south wall of the nave, from the east, is a three-light arched window, a 17th-century two-light square-headed window, and a 12th-century semicircular-arched doorway. The west window of the aisle contains a 19th-century three-light window.

=== Interior ===
Between the nave and the north aisle is a two-bay arcade with semicircular arches. The arcade between the chancel and the chapel is in three bays and dates from about 1300. On the east wall of the chancel are trefoil-headed niches flanking the window, over which are crocketted gables, and there are smaller niches on each side between the larger niches and the window. Also in this wall is a blocked doorway to the left of the altar. In the north aisle is a piscina with a trefoil head. The font is square on a circular base. There are two pulpits in the church. The 19th-century stained glass in the east window is by Clayton and Bell, and that in the south wall of the chancel, dated 1921, is by Kempe and Co. The memorials include those to the Stafford and O'Brien families who lived at Blatherwyke Hall. There is also a wall memorial to the poet Thomas Randolph who died while visiting Blatherwyke Hall. The memorial was made by the sculptor Nicholas Stone in about 1640, and was commissioned by Sir Christopher Hatton. The single-manual organ was built in 1908 by P. Conacher and Company of Huddersfield.

== See also ==
- List of churches preserved by the Churches Conservation Trust in the English Midlands
