= Glebe Creek =

Stream in Talbot County, Maryland, U.S.

Coordinates: 38°47′40″N 76°6′30″W

Glebe Creek is a stream in Talbot County, Maryland, in the United States.

Glebe Creek derives its name from the glebe which owned it in Colonial Maryland.

== See also ==
- List of rivers of Maryland
