= Glebe House (New Castle, Delaware) =

Historic house in Delaware, United States

- U.S. National Register of Historic Places
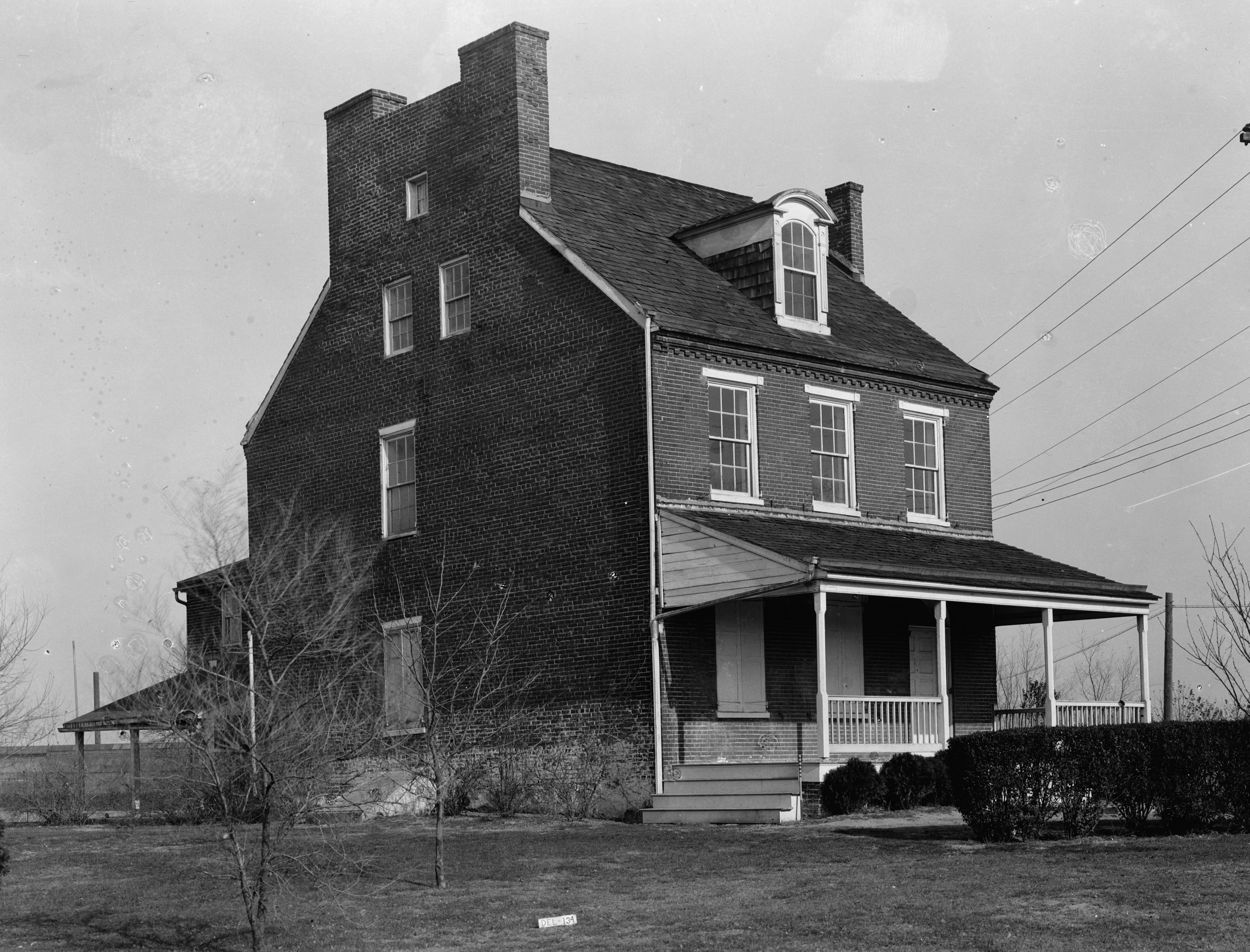
- Glebe House, HABS Photo, November 1936

- Location within Delaware Location within the United States
- Location: 350 Glebe Ln., New Castle, Delaware
- Coordinates: 39.668745°N 75.558687°W
- Area: 1 acre (0.40 ha)
- Built: c. 1821
- NRHP reference No.: 73000521
- Added to NRHP: April 3, 1973

Glebe House is a historic house located at New Castle, Delaware, United States. It was built between 1821 and 1823 as the glebe house of the rector of Immanuel Church. The house consists of three sections, all brick: a 2 1/2-story plus attic, three bay section; a lower middle section of three bays with a shed roof; and a north section comprising the original kitchen.

It was added to the National Register of Historic Places in 1973.
