= Acton Baldwyn =

English politician (1681–1727)

Acton Baldwyn (27 June 1681 – 30 January 1727) was an English Tory politician. He sat as MP for Ludlow from 1705 until 1715 and 1722 until January 1727.

He was the first son of Charles Baldwyn and Elizabeth, the daughter of Nicholas Acton who died in 1727 along with her son. He was educated at Balliol College, Oxford and matriculated in 1698. He entered the Inner Temple in 1701. He married Eleanor, the third daughter of Sir Charles Skrymsher.
