= St Peter's Church, Deene =

Coordinates: 52.5243°N 0.5984°W

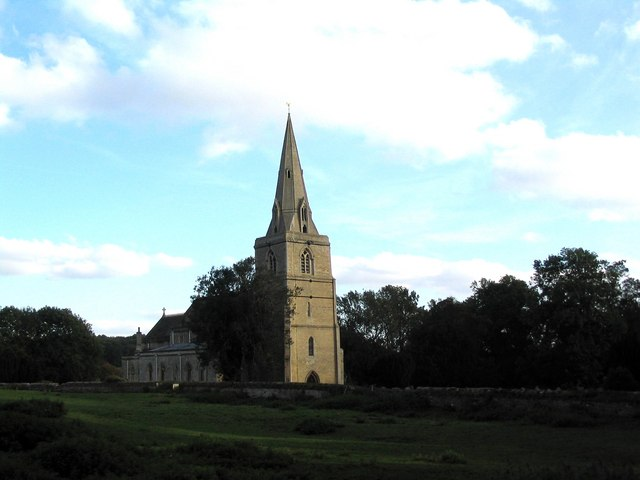
- St Peter's Church, Deene, from the southwest

- Location in Northamptonshire
- OS grid reference: SP 951 927
- Location: Deene, Northamptonshire
- Country: England
- Denomination: Anglican
- Website: Churches Conservation Trust

History
- Dedication: Saint Peter

Architecture
- Functional status: Redundant
- Heritage designation: Grade II*
- Designated: 23 May 1967
- Architect(s): T. H. Wyatt, G. F. Bodley
- Architectural type: Church
- Style: Gothic, Gothic Revival
- Groundbreaking: 13th century
- Completed: 1890

Specifications
- Materials: Limestone, roofs in lead and Collyweston stone slate

St Peter's Church is an Anglican church in the village of Deene, Northamptonshire, England. It is recorded in the National Heritage List for England as a designated Grade II* listed building, and is under the care of The Churches Conservation Trust and East Northamptonshire Council.

== History ==
The church dates from the 13th century. Since the 16th century it has been the estate church of the Brudenell family, who bought Deene Park in 1514. In 1869 the widow of James Brudenell, 7th Earl of Cardigan commissioned T. H. Wyatt to rebuild much of the church. The result of this has been described as "austere". In 1890 G. F. Bodley furnished and decorated the chancel in a "sumptuous" manner.

== Architecture ==
=== Exterior ===
St Peter's is constructed in limestone with roofs covered partly in lead and partly in Collyweston stone slate. Its plan consists of a nave with a clerestory, north and south aisles, north and south chapels, a chancel, a south transept, a south porch, and a west tower. The tower is in three stages, with corner buttresses and a stair turret in the southwest corner. The lowest stage contains a west door, above which is a lancet window. In the middle stage are lancet windows on the north and west faces. The top stage has two-light bell openings on each side. Above these is a corbel table, and a plain parapet. On the tower is a broach spire with two tiers of lucarnes. The large east window of the chancel has five lights, and there is a circular opening above it. The transept has a three-light south window. Along the south aisle are three two- and three-light windows. The south chapel has a three-light east window, and in the west wall of the south aisle is a two-light window. Above the outer doorway of the porch is a plaque carved with cross keys. The porch is gabled with a finial. On the sides of the porch are two-light square-headed windows. Along the north aisle and north chapel are seven windows and a priest's door. The north aisle has a three-light east window. Along the clerestory are four square-headed windows.

=== Interior ===
Inside the church is a four-bay arcade in the nave, and a two-bay arcade n the chancel. The chancel walls have stencil decorations by Bodley. To the right of the altar is a piscina and a triple sedilia with trefoil heads and crocketted gables, and there is a similar niche to the left of the altar. The chancel floor is tiled. The stained glass in the east window is by Lavers, Barraud and Westlake, dating from about 1868, and there is more 19th-century stained glass elsewhere in the church. The octagonal font and the pink marble pulpit also date from the 19th century. In the south chapel is a reredos dating from about 1635.

The south aisle, south chapel and transept contain monuments to the Brudenell family. The monument to Sir Robert Brudenell, who died in 1531, and his two wives, consists of three recumbent alabaster effigies on a sarcophagus. There are brasses to Edmund Brudenell who died in 1585, Sir Thomas Brudenell, who died in 1549, John Brudenell, who died in 1606, Edmund Brudenell, who died in 1652 and Robert Brudenell who died in 1549. Thomas Brudenell, who died in 1664, has a chest tomb. In the west wall of the transept is a memorial to Anne, Duchess of Richmond, who died in 1722. A wall tablet by Sievier is to the memory of the Countess of Cardigan, who died in 1826. The memorial to James Brudenell, 7th Earl of Cardigan, who died in 1868, and his wife, was designed by J. E. Boehm. This consists of recumbent effigies on a sarcophagus, with bronze sea horses at the bottom corners. The 7th Earl of Cardigan was the leader of the Charge of the Light Brigade in 1854.

== External features ==
In the churchyard are four items that have been designated Grade II listed buildings. One is the headstone of Stephen Eaton dated 1691. There is a row of chest tombs of the Yorke family dating from the late 18th to the 19th century. A chest tomb dated 1768 is that of the Webster family. Another chest tomb is dated 1735.

== See also ==
- List of churches preserved by the Churches Conservation Trust in the English Midlands
