= Glebe House, Easton on the Hill =

Glebe House
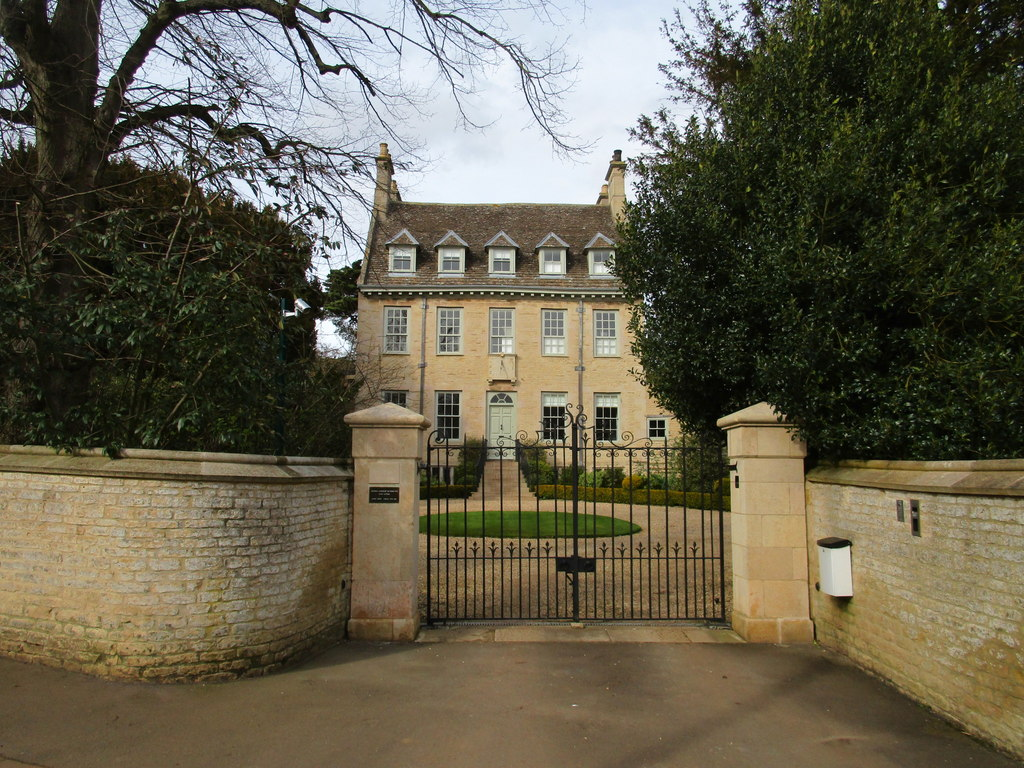
- The building in 2020

- Location within Northamptonshire Location within England
- 52.6296°N 0.51022°W
- Location: Easton on the Hill, North Northamptonshire, England

History
- Built: 1690 (336 years ago)

Site notes
- Governing body: Historic England

Listed Building – Grade II*
- Official name: Glebe House and Attached Steps and Railings
- Designated: 23 May 1967
- Reference no.: 1225510

Glebe House is an historic building in Easton on the Hill, North Northamptonshire, England. Dating to 1690, it is now a Grade II* listed structure, as are its steps and railings.

Located three miles to the east of Stamford, Lincolnshire, the property was originally the rectory of the Reverend John Skynner, a fellow of St John's College, Cambridge. Skynner named the rectory Lutine House in honour of his son, Lancelot, who was the captain of HMS Lutine when it sank off the Dutch coast in 1799, with the loss of all but one of the estimated 240 people on board. The home was later named for William and Mary Glebe.

It is two storeys of square coursed limestone with ashlar dressing, with Collyweston slate on the roof. An inscription, in the keystone above the front door, says "fear the Lord always". The building remains unaltered from when it was built, except for the southern elevation, which is believed to have been refaced in the 19th century.

The building was renovated by Andre Vrona in the early 21st century. He purchased the home with his wife, Caroline, in 1999.

== Sources ==
- Historic England, "Glebe House and Attached Steps and Railings (1225510)", National Heritage List for England
