= Bulwick =

Village in Northamptonshire, England

Coordinates: 52.5400°N 0.5934°W

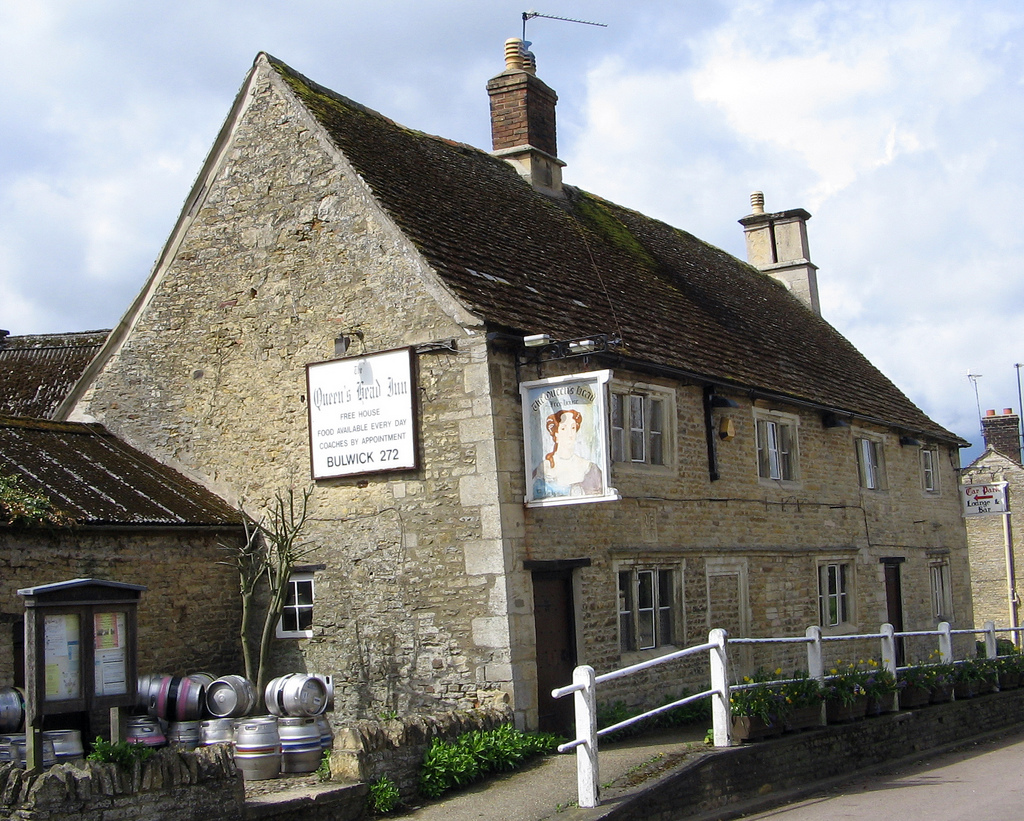
- The Queen's Head

- Location within Northamptonshire
- Population: 171 (2011)
- OS grid reference: SP9594
- Unitary authority: North Northamptonshire
- Ceremonial county: Northamptonshire
- Region: East Midlands
- Country: England
- Sovereign state: United Kingdom
- Post town: Corby
- Postcode district: NN17
- Dialling code: 01780
- Police: Northamptonshire
- Fire: Northamptonshire
- Ambulance: East Midlands
- UK Parliament: Corby and East Northamptonshire

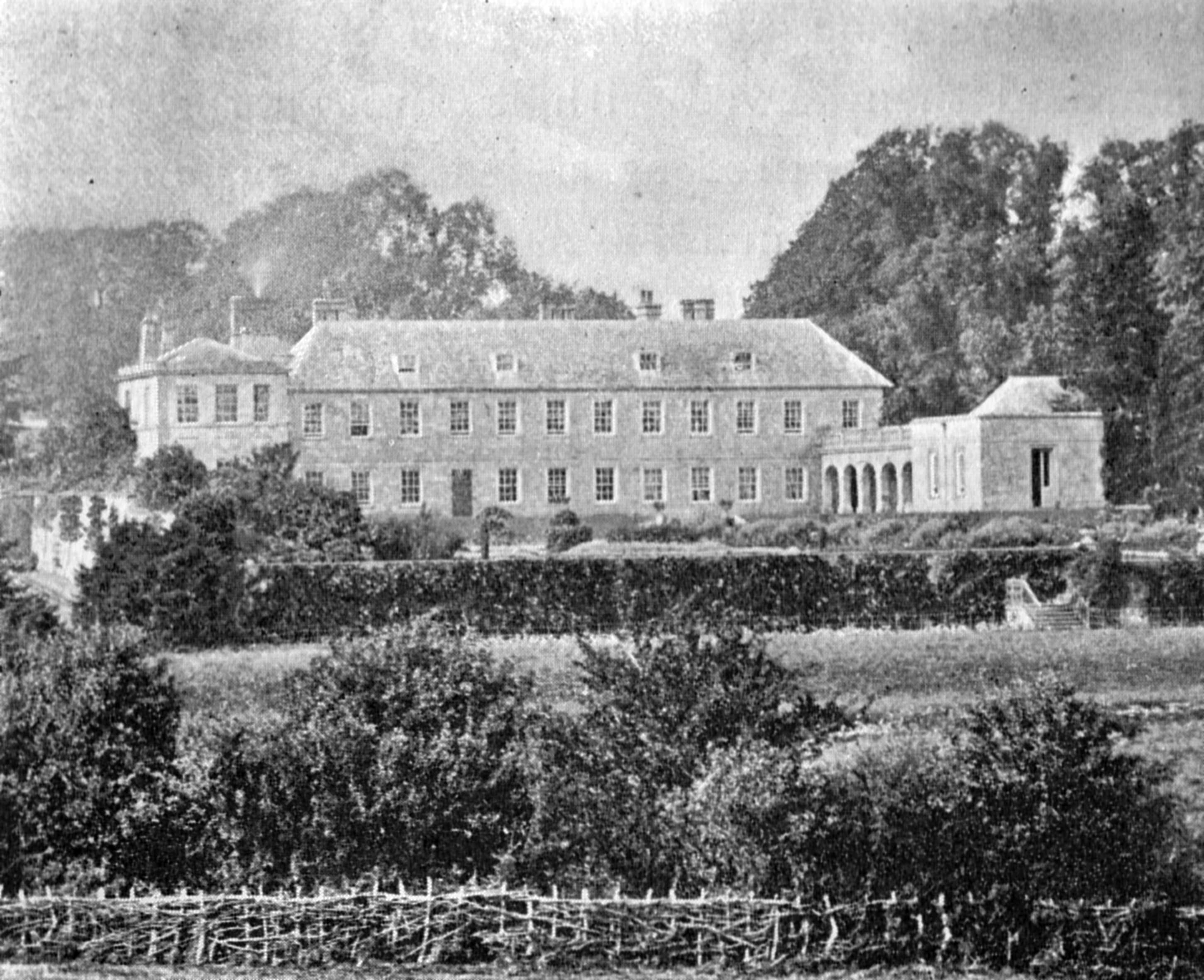
Bulwick Park, home of the Tryon family

Bulwick is a village and civil parish in North Northamptonshire, England. According to the 2001 census it had a population of 152 people, including Blatherwycke and increasing to 171 at the 2011 census. It is about six miles north-east of Corby, and is just off the A43 road. The Willow Brook runs through the village.

The villages name means 'bull specialised farm'.

The village Church of England parish church is dedicated to St Nicholas. Bulwick Meadows is a Site of Special Scientific Interest.

The village is twinned with Adams, North Dakota.
