= Powys (surname) =

Powys, is a Welsh surname. Notable people with the surname include:

- Albert Powys (1881–1936), British architect and Secretary of the Society for the Protection of Ancient Buildings
- Arthur Powys (1842–1875), New Zealand cricketer
- Betsan Powys (born 1965), Welsh journalist and former Editor of Programmes for BBC Radio Cymru
- Caroline Girle Powys (1736–1817), British diarist
- Eiludd Powys, early 7th-century King of Powys
- Frederick Powys (1808–1863), English cricketer
- George Powys, 7th Baron Lilford (1931–2005), British businessman
- Horatio Powys (1805–1877), priest in the Church of England and Bishop of Sodor and Man
- John Cowper Powys (1872–1963), English philosopher, lecturer, novelist, critic and poet
- John Powys, 5th Baron Lilford (1863–1945), British peer and cricketer
- Littleton Powys (1647–1732), a Justice of the King's Bench
- Littleton Powys (cricketer) (1771–1842), English cricketer
- Llewelyn Powys (1884–1939), British novelist and essayist
- Mark Powys, 8th Baron Lilford (born 1975)
- Philippa Powys (1886–1963), British novelist and poet
- Richard Powys (1844–1913), English cricketer
- Stephen Powys, 6th Baron Lilford (1869–1949), British peer
- T. F. Powys (1875–1953), British writer
- Thomas Powys (judge) (1649–1719), English lawyer, judge and Tory politician
- Thomas Powys (priest) (1747–1809), Anglican clergyman
- Thomas Powys, 1st Baron Lilford (1743–1800), British politician
- Thomas Powys, 2nd Baron Lilford (1775–1825), British peer
- Thomas Powys, 3rd Baron Lilford (1801–1861), British peer and Whig politician
- Thomas Powys, 4th Baron Lilford (1833–1896), British aristocrat and ornithologist
- Walter Powys (1849–1892), English first-class cricketer

== See also ==
- Powis (disambiguation), including a list of people with the surname
