= Thomas Powys =

Thomas Powys may refer to:

- Thomas Powys (judge) (1649–1719), MP and Attorney General to King James II
- Thomas Powys (priest) (1747–1809), Anglican clergyman
- Thomas Powys, 1st Baron Lilford (1743–1800), British politician
- Thomas Powys, 2nd Baron Lilford (1775–1825), British peer
- Thomas Powys, 3rd Baron Lilford (1801–1861), British peer and politician
- Thomas Powys, 4th Baron Lilford (1833–1896), British aristocrat and ornithologist

== See also ==
- Powys Thomas (1926–1977), British-born actor in Canada
