= Robert Vernon Atherton Gwillym =

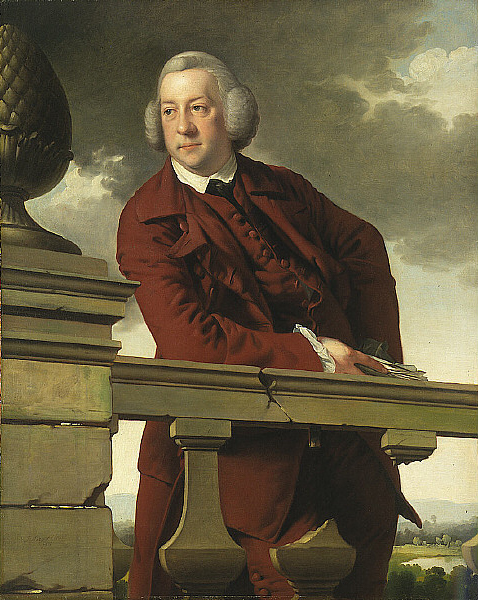
Portrait of Atherton by Joseph Wright of Derby

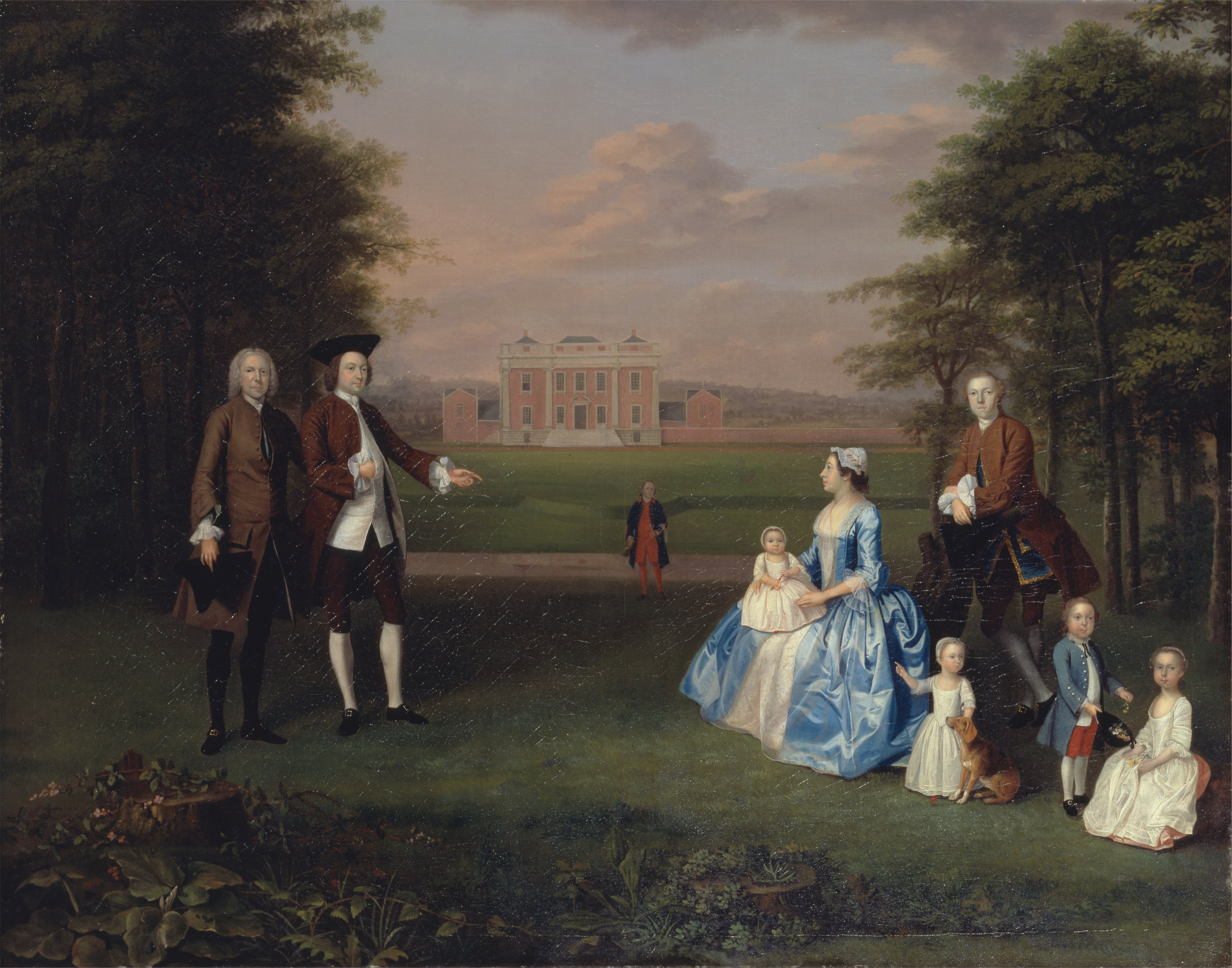
A young Robert Gwillym and his Family by Arthur Devis (painted between 1745 and 1747)

Robert Vernon Atherton Gwillym (28 August 1741 – 9 July 1783), known as Robert Vernon Atherton after 1779, was a British landowner and politician. He served as Member of Parliament for Newton in the House of Commons of Great Britain from 1774 to 1780. A member of the influential Atherton family of Lancashire, he inherited substantial estates and was active in regional and national politics during the late eighteenth century.

== Early life ==
Robert Vernon Atherton Gwillym was born on 28 August 1741, the second son of Robert Gwillym of Langstone Court, Herefordshire,[1] and his wife, Elizabeth Atherton (1721–1763). Through his mother, he was connected to one of Lancashire's most prominent landed families, whose wealth and influence had been established through landownership, commerce, and political service.

His maternal grandparents were Richard Atherton (1700–1726) of Atherton Hall and Elizabeth Farrington.[2] The Atherton’s were among the leading families of south Lancashire and had long been associated with Atherton Hall, the family's ancestral seat. Through this lineage, Gwillym was a direct descendant of the Atherton family and ultimately became heir to a substantial estate that strengthened his position within the British landed gentry.

Raised between the social worlds of the Herefordshire gentry and the Lancashire landowning elite, Gwillym benefited from family connections that provided opportunities for advancement in public life. These relationships, together with the inheritance he later acquired through the Atherton line, contributed to his emergence as a figure of local and national importance during the eighteenth century.

Following the extinction of the senior male line of the Atherton family, Gwillym inherited the Atherton estates and, in 1779, assumed the surname Atherton in accordance with the terms of the inheritance. Thereafter he was known as Robert Vernon Atherton, a name that reflected his succession to one of Lancashire's most distinguished landed families.

== Career ==
He succeeded his brother William in 1771, and inherited Atherton Hall, Leigh. That same year he is listed as a subscriber to a journal on travels to America and of agriculture and plantations.

At the 1774 general election, Gwillym was returned unopposed as Member of Parliament for Newton on the interest of his father-in-law. His attendance in Parliament was very infrequent as he suffered from poor health. His only recorded vote was for Wilkes's Middlesex resolution, and he is not recorded as having spoken. He did not stand at the 1780 general election.

== Personal life ==
In January 1763, he married Henrietta Maria Legh, daughter of Peter Legh (1706–1792) of Lyme Park and Bank Hall. Together, they were the parents of two sons, who died young, and four daughters.

- Henrietta Maria Atherton, who married Thomas Powys, 2nd Baron Lilford in 1797 at Penwortham, Lancashire; they had twelve children.

Gwillym took name of Atherton in 1779. He died in France on 9 July 1783.

=== Legacy ===
In 1766 at the age of 25, both he and his family were painted by Joseph Wright of Derby The family portraits were inherited by his eldest daughter, Henrietta Maria Vernon Atherton, the wife of Thomas Powys, 2nd Baron Lilford and remained under the ownership of the Lilford family until 1961.

== Descendants ==
- Thomas Powys, 3rd Baron Lilford
- Thomas Powys, 4th Baron Lilford
- John Powys, 5th Baron Lilford
- Stephen Powys, 6th Baron Lilford
- George Powys, 7th Baron Lilford
- Mark Powys, 8th Baron Lilford

Parliament of Great Britain
Preceded by Anthony James Keck; Peter Legh	Member of Parliament for Newton; 1774–1780; With: Anthony James Keck	Succeeded by Thomas Peter Legh; Thomas Davenport, KC
