= Bewsey Old Hall =

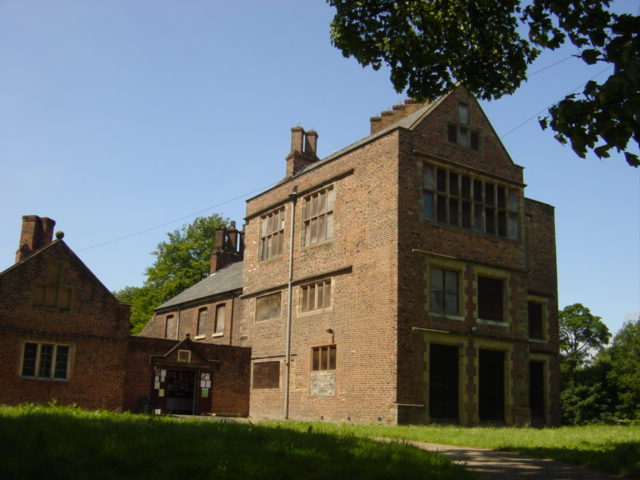
- Bewsey Old Hall

- Location in Cheshire
- 53°24′04″N 2°37′21″W
- Location: Warrington, Cheshire
- OS grid reference: SJ5907489571

History
- Built: 16th century with subsequent changes

Site notes
- Area: Old Hall

Listed Building – Grade II*
- Official name: Bewsey Old Hall
- Designated: 4 December 1951
- Reference no.: 1230619

Scheduled monument
- Official name: Bewsey Old Hall moated site, fishpond and connecting channel
- Designated: 17 December 1991
- Reference no.: 1012324

Bewsey Old Hall is a brick-built, three-storey, mainly Jacobean building, incorporating or reusing elements of a former medieval hall on the edge of Sankey Valley Park in Warrington, Cheshire. The estate was home to the Lords of Warrington from the 13th to the 17th century.

The name 'Bewsey' is believed to have been derived from the French Beau Se, or "is beautiful" and likely refers to the hall's position on the edge of Burton Wood, next to Sankey Brook.

== History ==
Sir William Fitz Almeric Le Boteler, Lord of Warrington, built Bewsey Old Hall following the destruction by fire of his original house, which was nearer the current town centre on the Mote Hill (near to the site of the current parish church, St Elphin's). The date of the fire is not recorded exactly, but is believed to be between 1256 and 1259. To build the house, Boteler obtained lands in Burton Wood from his feudal Lord, Earl Ferrar, in 1260 and from Prince Edmund in 1270. A monastic grange, owned by the monks of Titley Abbey, in Essex, previously occupied the site. The first hall, a single-storey wooden medieval hall of which nothing now remains, was replaced by a brick building in the 16th century.

Thomas Boteler, the founder of Sir Thomas Boteler Church of England High School, was born at Bewsey Old Hall in 1461. In 1463, his father Sir John FitzJohn le Boteler was murdered and Thomas's elder brother, William, inherited the estates. William died at the age of 22, fighting in the Lancastrian ranks at the Battle of Tewkesbury in 1471, and Thomas inherited the estates and was knighted in 1504. He died at Bewsey Old Hall on 27 April 1522 and was buried in the Boteler chapel of St Elphin's Church.

Bewsey Old Hall passed to Robert Dudley, 1st Earl of Leicester, in 1586 in settlement of gambling debts when Edward Boteler died without an heir. Dudley sold the estate to lawyer Thomas Ireland, of Childwall, and the house remained in the possession of the Ireland family for six generations until 1675. Sir Thomas was knighted at Bewsey by King James I in 1617; the king later stayed the night at Bewsey. Sir Thomas Ireland was father in law of Gilbert Ireland.

In 1675 Bewsey Old Hall was inherited by Richard Atherton from the Dame Margaret Ireland, the widow of Gilbert Ireland. Atherton never used Bewsey Old Hall as his primary residence, preferring Atherton Hall, Leigh. In the mid-18th century his descendants added a new wing to the building. Legend states that the Stuart prince Bonnie Prince Charlie stayed the night there, on his retreat from Derby during the Jacobite rising of 1745.

The house passed by marriage to the Lilford family in 1797, when the Atherton estate was inherited by Thomas Powys, Lord Lilford, who preferred to live at the family seat, Lilford Hall in Northamptonshire. The Lilfords also inherited Atherton Hall; however, they considered one property in Lancashire adequate for their needs and lavished considerable expense on Bewsey Hall. After failing to sell Atherton Hall, which was less than a century old, it was demolished in 1824, with some of the furniture and carpets being sent to Bewsey. They later demolished the 18th-century wing and in 1860–61 a new half-timbered house (Bewsey New Hall) was built on a different site west of Camp Road for Thomas Powys, 4th Baron Lilford, as a replacement for the Old Hall. The original hall was converted into two farmhouses and let to tenants. The new building was almost certainly designed by W. G. Habershon, but Lady Lilford disliked the house so much that she refused to live in it and it was largely demolished in the 1940s, apart from a fragment of the west wing.

Bewsey Old Hall was Grade II* listed in 1951 and the remains of the moat and fishpond constitute a scheduled monument. The adjoining 18th-century farmhouse is separately listed at Grade II.

== Building and grounds ==
The original 14th-century moat only partly holds water today. The building has distinctive chimneystacks and stone mullion windows, which are most likely the work of Sir Thomas Ireland and date back to around 1600. Bewsey's remaining medieval structures were demolished during the 18th century, when the hall was extended, and landscaping works filled in parts of the moat and enlarged others as water features. In 1863, a 'New Hall' was built, and Bewsey Old Hall was left in the hands of tenants, until, in considerable disrepair, it was acquired by Warrington Development Corporation in 1974.

== Notable events ==
Sir John Boteler, Lord of Warrington, was murdered in his bed in 1521 at Bewsey Hall, the murderers allegedly acting on the orders of his brother-in-law, Edward Stanley, 3rd Earl of Derby, with whom he had been on bad terms for some time. Sir Piers Legh and Sir William Savage, whom Stanley had employed to carry out the deed, bribed the porter at Bewsey to place a lighted taper in a certain window when the house had settled down for the evening. They then crossed the moat in a coracle like boat and stole into Sir John's bedchamber; a struggle ensued with the chamberlain, who was also murdered. They later hung the treacherous servant from a tree in the Bewsey estate, so that he could not give evidence against them.

Legend has it that the Bonnie Prince Charlie stayed the night there, on his retreat from Derby during the 1745 campaign.

== Recent history ==
Warrington New Town Development Corporation purchased the house from Lord Lilford in 1974. In September 2011, the hall was subject to an arson attack, and lost part of its roof. Despite local campaigns against it, a public inquiry, held in May and September 2011 granted permission for seven flats to be built in the Grade II* listed hall. Development company Next Big Thing have now redeveloped the property into a number of apartments.
