= Richard Atherton =

English Politician

Sir Richard Atherton

Member of Parliament for Liverpool
- In office 1685–1687
- Monarch: James II

Mayor of Liverpool
- In office 1684–1684
- Monarch: Charles II

Personal details
- Born: 22 September 1656 Warrington, Lancashire, England
- Died: 11 January 1687 (aged 30) Warrington, Lancashire, England
- Resting place: Warrington
- Spouse(s): Isabel Holt; Elizabeth Charnock
- Known for: Landowner, civic official, parliamentary representative of Liverpool

Sir Richard Atherton (22 September 1656 - 11 January 1687), was a Tory politician and an English Member of Parliament elected in 1671 representing Liverpool (UK Parliament constituency). He also served as Mayor of Liverpool from 1684 to 1685. He resided at Bewsey Old Hall, Warrington.

== Early life ==
Richard Atherton was born posthumously in Warrington, after the death of his father, John Atherton (1624–1656), a Parliamentarian officer during the English Civil War and later a local office-holder under the Protectorate.

Atherton was raised by his mother, Mary Rawsthone (née Bolde), daughter of Richard Bolde of Warrington. Through his mother’s family connections and inheritance from the Ireland family, Atherton succeeded to the Bewsey estate near Warrington in 1675, becoming one of the principal landowners in the area. It is possible that both his mother and father descended from Edward I of England.

His father has been described as of the traditional political elite, a presbyterian, who had served as a Captain in the parliamentary army during the English Civil War (1642-1651) and taken prisoner at the Battle of Marston Moor. During peacetime his father served twice as Sheriff of Lancaster under the Lord Protector Oliver Cromwell. His elder brother died days after his father.

Atherton, unlike his father was an Anglican and a High Tory. He was educated at Brasenose College, Oxford in 1672 and Gray's Inn in 1675.

=== Bewsey Old Hall ===
He was born into a prominent Warrington family and inherited the Bewsey Old Hall estate in 1675, upon the death of his great-aunt, Dame Margaret Ireland, widow of Gilbert Ireland. This inheritance came through from the Ireland family, from whom Atherton was descended through his grandmother Eleanor Ireland. This increased his wealth and established him among the leading landed families of Lancashire.

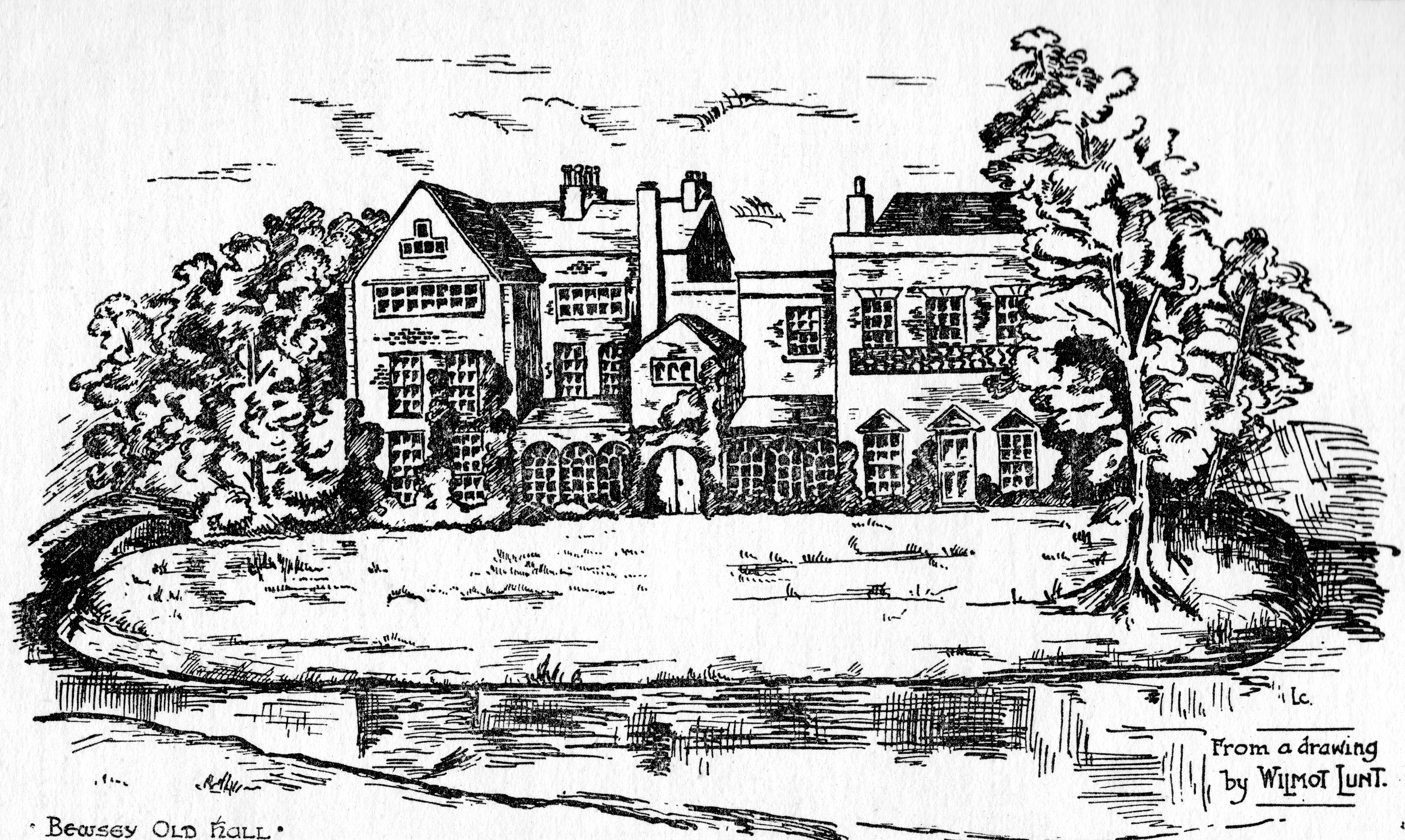
Bewsey Old Hall

The property had previously belonged to the Boteler family, Lords of the Manor of Warrington, before passing to the Ireland family in the late sixteenth century. The estate remained in Ireland ownership for several generations until Dame Margaret Ireland’s death, when it passed to Atherton. The hall had hosted King James I during a royal visit in 1617, when Sir Thomas Ireland was knighted there.

Although Atherton inherited the family seat, it was not his principal residence, as he appears to have preferred Atherton Hall near Leigh. Nevertheless, possession of the Bewsey estate enhanced his local standing and helped support his later political career as Member of Parliament for Liverpool and Mayor of Liverpool.

== Political career ==
Atherton entered national politics at an early age and was elected Member of Parliament for Liverpool in 1671. His election was subsequently declared void following a petition, and he did not retain the seat. His political advancement was assisted by connections with influential Lancashire families, including the Molyneux interest.

He remained active in county and borough affairs during the 1670s and 1680s and became associated with the court interest during the later years of the reign of King Charles II. He is said to have been a regular visitor to the Court of Charles II. He received a knighthood months after the aftermath of the Rye House Plot of 1683 (a plot to assassinate the King), a period of trials and executions. These were politically turbulent times, leading to the rebellion of 1685, the Monmouth Rebellion and Argyll's Rising. The ceremony took place on 22 June 1684 at Windsor Castle.

Whilst his father had been a parliamentarian who fought against the royalists, Atherton’s political career took place during the period of Restoration covering the reign of Charles II (1660–1685) and the brief reign of his younger brother James II (1685–1688).

His terms in office from Member of Parliament during the 1670s, followed by Mayor and Alderman of Liverpool, covered the whole Restoration period of the House of Stuart, which ended with the death of Queen Anne. The growth of Liverpool had accelerated since 1660, by trading with America and the West Indies in cloth, coal and salt from Lancashire and Cheshire in exchange for sugar and tobacco. Atherton was first elected as Member of Parliament for Liverpool in 1671, on the interest of Lord Molyneaux, but was unseated on petition.

== Mayor of Liverpool ==
Atherton served as Lord Mayor of Liverpool in 1684. During his mayoralty he was involved in one of the most significant constitutional episodes in the town’s seventeenth-century history: the surrender of Liverpool’s charter to the Crown.

The surrender formed part of a wider policy pursued by Charles II’s government to increase royal control over municipal corporations. Atherton participated in the presentation of the charter to Judge George Jeffreys, who played a leading role in the Crown’s legal proceedings against municipal charters. The episode placed Liverpool within the broader national struggle between local self-government and royal authority during the late Stuart period. This event took place at at Bewsey Old Hall in 1684.

Atherton was knighted by Charles II in 1684, further reflecting his standing within local and national political circles.

Atherton was politically aligned to the young Earl of Derby, who had succeeded his father in the baronetcy at the age of one in 1672. The Stanleys of Bickerstaffe descended from Sir James Stanley, younger brother of Thomas Stanley, 2nd Earl of Derby, 3rd Baron Stanley. The Liverpool charter had been described as municipal subordination and a form of oligarchy.

The notes on the Liverpool Charters refer to Atherton as the first modern Mayor of Liverpool. He remained in this role until 1685.

== Return to Parliament ==
In 1685 Atherton was again elected Member of Parliament for Liverpool, serving in the Parliament of James II until his death in 1687, just one year prior to the Glorious Revolution.

His career coincided with Liverpool’s rapid growth as an Atlantic trading port engaged in commerce including coal, salt, textiles, tobacco, and sugar.

Sir Richard Atherton was the last member of the Atherton family in the male line to sit in Parliament.

== Ancestry ==
He was the eleventh in descent from Sir William Atherton, who represented the same county as Member of Parliament in 1381. Atherton’s grandmother was Eleanor Ireland, and like Dame Margaret, also descended from Sir Thomas Ireland.

== Personal life ==
In 1676 he married Isabel Holt, daughter of Thomas Holt of Grizzlehurst. The marriage produced several children. Some sources state that Isabel was the first daughter of Richard Holt of Castleton and Stubley. They had one son John, and three daughters, Catherine, Isabel and Dorothy.

Following Isabel’s death, Atherton married Elizabeth Charnock on 1 November 1686. They had no children. Some genealogical sources also suggest a third marriage to Agnes Dodding, daughter of Miles Dodding of Conishead; however, this is not confirmed in major contemporary or parliamentary biographies.

== Death and legacy ==
Atherton died on 11 January 1687 at Warrington. He was buried locally.

Although his political career was brief, he held significant civic office during a period of rapid economic expansion in Liverpool and during important constitutional conflicts between Crown and borough governance.

Immediately prior to his death he made a will on 30 December 1686 and appointed his brother in law, James Holt and friend William Bankes as guardians of his children.

=== Descendants ===
His son, John Atherton (1678-1707) inherited his estate and married Elizabeth Cholmondeley, of Vale Royal Abbey, and permitted the Unitarians to build a chapel on the Atherton estate. His grandson, was known as “mad Richard” Atherton (1701-1726), a high Tory, closed the chapel and was responsible for the construction of Atherton Hall. His male line of descent became extinct with the death of his grandson, Richard Atherton (1700-1726) at an early age.

His great granddaughter Elizabeth Atherton (1721-1763) married Robert Gwillym. Their son Robert Vernon Atherton Gwillym, who sat in the House of Commons from 1774 to 1780, changed his name from Gwillym to Atherton in 1779, almost certainly so he could inherit all of the Atherton estate, only to die in France in 1783, just a few years later. Notable descendants include Robert Vernon Atherton Gwillym, Reginald Heber (Bishop of Calcutta), Horatio Powys and Thomas Powys, 3rd Baron Lilford.
