= Lilford Park =

Lilford Park may refer to:

- Lilford Park (Northamptonshire) associated with Lilford Hall, near Oundle
- Lilford Park (Lancashire) associated with Atherton Hall, Leigh
