= Powys (disambiguation) =

Powys is a county in Wales.

Powys may also refer to:

- Kingdom of Powys, a medieval kingdom in what is now Wales and England
- Powys (surname)
- Powys Thomas (1925–1977), British-born actor

== See also ==
- Powis (disambiguation)
