= John Stevens (New Zealand cricketer) =

New Zealand cricketer

Personal information
- Full name: John Wise Stevens
- Born: 1828; England
- Died: 27 March 1873 (aged 44–45); Christchurch, New Zealand

Career statistics
Competition	First-class
Matches	3
Runs scored	29
Batting average	5.80
100s/50s	0/0
Top score	12
Balls bowled	392
Wickets	12
Bowling average	7.83
5 wickets in innings	1
10 wickets in match	0
Best bowling	5/17
Catches/stumpings	0/0
- Source: Cricinfo, 26 October 2020

John Wise Stevens (1828 – 27 March 1873) was a New Zealand cricketer. He played in three first-class matches for Canterbury from 1864 to 1866.

== Cricket career ==
Stevens had been a farm labourer in Shropshire, but in Christchurch in the 1860s he was a professional cricketer. In the 1863-64 season he bowled to members of the Canterbury Cricket Club at Hagley Park for three shillings an hour.

He took the first wicket in New Zealand first-class cricket. Opening the bowling for Canterbury against Otago in January 1864, he had Charles Morris caught by Arthur Powys for 1. Against Otago the next season he took 2 for 23 and 5 for 17 to help Canterbury to their first first-class victory.

== Personal life ==
Stevens was born in England. He married Mary Tenterden Abbott in Horsmonden, Kent, in 1850. They arrived in Christchurch in 1862 with their two children. Mary died in Christchurch in October 1865.

In March 1873 Stevens was working as a miner in the railway tunnel between Christchurch and Lyttelton when he was killed by a train. He had been assigned nightwatchman duties, but fell asleep on the line and died instantly when the passing train struck him. A special train took his body from Lyttelton to Christchurch for the funeral; the flags at the Port of Lyttelton flew at half-mast as a sign of respect.

== See also ==
- List of Canterbury representative cricketers
