= Arthur Powys =

New Zealand cricketer

Personal information
- Full name: Arthur Littleton Powys
- Born: 17 October 1842; Thrapston, Northamptonshire, England
- Died: 8 October 1875 (aged 32); Alexandra Colony, Santa Fe Province, Argentina
- Relatives: Richard Powys (brother); Walter Powys (brother)

Domestic team information
- Years: Team
- 1863-64 to 1867-68: Canterbury
- Source: Cricinfo, 20 October 2020

Arthur Powys (17 October 1842 – 8 October 1875) was a New Zealand cricketer. He played in four first-class matches for Canterbury from 1863 to 1868.

Powys was born in Northamptonshire. He took the first catch in New Zealand first-class cricket in the match against Otago in January 1864 when he caught Charles Morris off the bowling of John Stevens for 1. A useful slow bowler and wicket-keeper, he captained Canterbury several times before returning to England in 1868. His brother Richard also played for Canterbury in the 1860s.

Powys was the first farmer in the Canterbury region to use steam-powered machinery. He imported the machinery from England in 1866 to use on his farm at Waipara, north of Christchurch.

Powys died in Argentina, where he was one of the settlers in the Alexandra Colony in Santa Fe Province in the 1870s. He died on 8 October 1875, one of a number of the colonists who were killed by the local indigenous inhabitants.

== See also ==
- List of Canterbury representative cricketers
