= Powis =

Powis may refer to:

== People ==
- Alfred Powis, Canadian businessperson
- Carl Powis (1928–1999), American baseball player
- Geoff Powis (1945–2001), Canadian ice hockey player
- Lynn Powis (born 1949), Canadian former ice hockey player
- Stephen Powis, National Medical Director for NHS England and professor of medicine
- William Henry Powis (1808–1836), British wood engraver
- Powis Pinder (1872–1941), British operatic baritone

== Titles ==
- Marquess of Powis, a title in the Peerage of England
  - Marchioness of Powis (disambiguation), a list of wives of marquesses of Powis
- Earl of Powis, a title in the Peerage of England
  - Countess of Powis (disambiguation), a list of wives of earls of Powis

== Other uses ==
- Powis Street, Greenwich, London, England
- Powis Street, one of the Welsh Streets, Liverpool, England
- Powis Academy, a school merged into St Machar Academy, a secondary school in Aberdeen, Scotland

== See also ==
- Powis Castle, British medieval castle, fortress and grand country house near Welshpool, Powys, Wales
- Powis House, a former 18th-century mansion in London, England
- Powis Square, London
- Powys (disambiguation)
