= Arthur Crichton =

English cricketer

Personal information
- Full name: Arthur William Crichton
- Born: 25 June 1833; Bushey, Hertfordshire, England
- Died: 4 February 1882 (aged 48); Westminster, London, England
- Batting: Unknown
- Relatives: Lord Lilford (nephew); Walter Powys (nephew); Horatio Powys-Keck (great-nephew)

Domestic team information
- Years: Team
- 1856: Marylebone Cricket Club

Career statistics
Competition	First-class
Matches	1
Runs scored	9
Batting average	9.00
100s/50s	–/–
Top score	7*
Catches/stumpings	1/–
- Source: Cricinfo, 31 October 2021

Arthur William Crichton JP DL (25 June 1833 – 4 February 1882) was an English first-class cricketer and naturalist.

The son of William John Crichton, he was born in June 1833 at Bushey, Hertfordshire. He was educated at Radley College, before going up to Trinity College, Cambridge. He played first-class cricket for the Marylebone Cricket Club (MCC) against Cambridge University Cricket Club at Cambridge in 1856. Batting twice in the match, he was dismissed for 2 runs in the MCC first innings by Matthews Kempson, while in their second innings he remained unbeaten on 7.

Crichton was a naturalist who was a Fellow of the London Zoological Society and the Linnean Society of London. Resident in Shropshire at Broadward Hall, he was appointed a deputy lieutenant of Shropshire in April 1880 and also served as a justice of the peace. Crichton died at Westminster in February 1882. His nephews, Lord Lilford and Walter Powys, both played first-class cricket, as did his great-nephew Horatio Powys-Keck.
