= John Powys =

John Powys may refer to:

- John Cowper Powys, English philosopher, lecturer, novelist, critic and poet
- John Powys, 5th Baron Lilford, British peer and cricketer
