= George Anthony Legh Keck =

British military officer and politician (1774–1860)

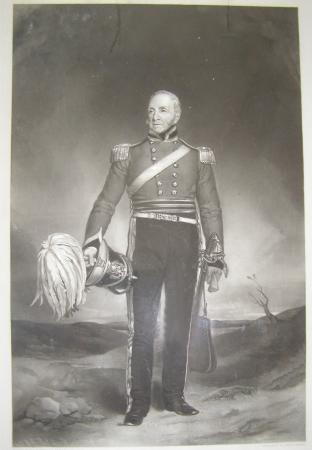

Member of Parliament for Leicestershire Leicester (1797-1831)
- Succeeded by: Charles March-Phillipps; Thomas Paget

Personal details
- Born: 15 July 1774 Stoughton, Leicestershire, England
- Died: 4 September 1860 (aged 86) Bank Hall, Bretherton, Lancashire, England
- Party: Tory
- Spouse: Elizabeth Atherton (m. 1802–1837)
- Relations: Anthony James Keck, MP (father); Sir Anthony Keck (great-grandfather); Lord Lilford (brother-in-law); Lord Newton (cousin) via the Leghs of Lyme
- Education: Christ Church, Oxford
- Occupation: Landowner
- Profession: Army officer, politician

Colonel George Anthony Legh Keck (15 July 1774 – 4 September 1860), sometimes spelled Legh-Keck, was a British military officer, Tory politician and landowner who sat in the House of Commons representing the parliamentary constituency of Leicestershire from 1797 to 1831.

== Early life ==
He was born at Stoughton Grange, Leicestershire, the only surviving son of Anthony James Keck, MP for Newton, and Elizabeth (née Legh), second daughter and co-heiress of Peter Legh (1706–1792), of Lyme Hall, Cheshire, whose wife, Elizabeth Atherton, inherited Bank Hall in Bretherton, Lancashire, which he renovated with help from the architect George Webster in 1832–33.

== Career ==
Legh-Keck was returned to parliament five times as MP for Leicestershire between 1797 and 1831.

Commissioned as an officer in the Leicestershire Yeomanry Cavalry in 1803, he later served as Lieutenant-Colonel Commandant of the regiment until his death in 1860. Legh-Keck, in a portrait from 1851, held a broad-topped shako sporting a 12-inch white plume held in place by bronze chin scales.

In 1805, Legh-Keck bought the lordship of the manor of Houghton-on-the-Hill which remained in the Lilford family until 1913. His younger cousin was William Legh, 1st Baron Newton, who previously served as a Member of Parliament.

== Personal life ==
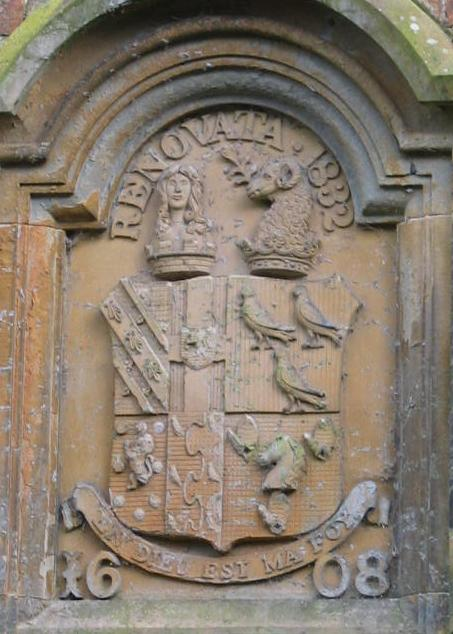
The Legh-Keck arms at Bank Hall

In 1802, Legh-Keck married his cousin, Elizabeth Atherton, second daughter and co-heiress of Robert Atherton, MP, of Atherton Hall, Lancashire and Henrietta Maria Legh of Lyme. In 1832, he engaged the architect, George Webster to design extensions and renovate Bank Hall, her ancestral mansion at Bretherton, Lancashire, also installing box pews at St Mary's Church, Tarleton, where he was patron of the living. His wife, Elizabeth Legh-Keck, died at Bank Hall in 1837. He died there, aged 86, on 4 September 1860. He was buried at Stoughton Church.

The Legh-Kecks had no children, so the Bank Hall estates passed to Thomas Atherton Powys (3rd Baron Lilford) and the Stoughton estate to his wife's nephew, Major Henry Littleton Powys-Keck. Thomas Littleton Powys, 4th Baron Lilford, who inherited Bank Hall from his father, the 3rd Baron Lilford, on 15 March 1861 auctioned its contents in April 1861 to cover death duties. Lord Lilford then removed to his family seat at Lilford Hall, Northamptonshire, leaving Bank Hall empty and leasing it out.

=== Collections ===
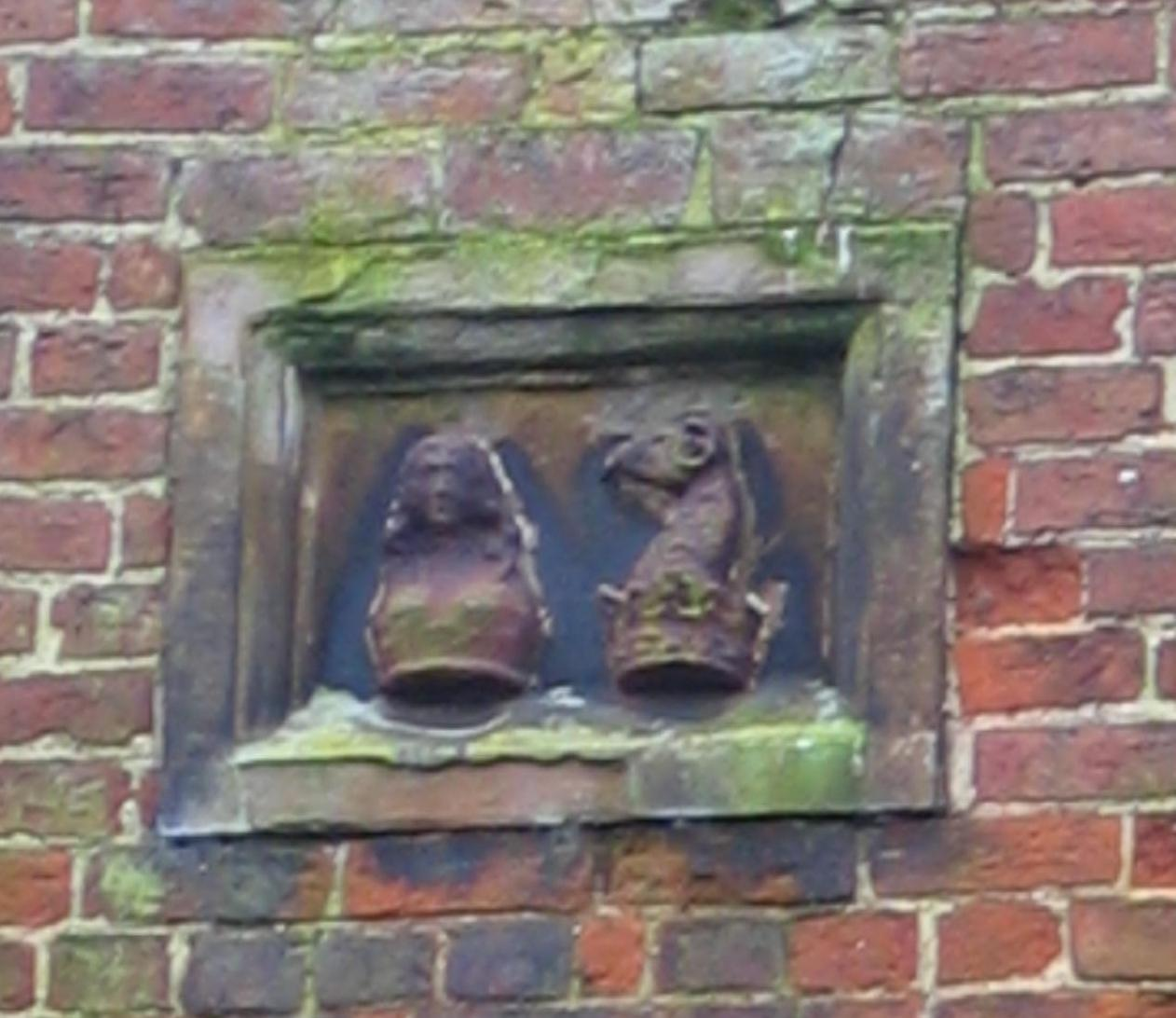
Legh-Keck heraldic crests at Bank Hall.

Legh-Keck collected stuffed animals and birds and sets of horns from species worldwide. He also owned a collection of classical-style statuettes and casts of figures by the sculptor Antonio Canova.

In 1830, the artist Thomas Phillips painted a portrait of Legh-Keck which now is at the Leicester Arts and Museums Service Collection.

A large mural painted on the wall of the drawing room at Bank Hall, subject unknown was lost when the roof of the west wing collapsed in the 1980s.

There is a collection of Colonel Legh-Keck's accoutrements held by the Leicestershire Yeomanry Association.

== See also ==
- Leighs of West Hall, High Legh
- Leghs of Adlington
- Earl of Chichester (1644 creation)
- Baron Leigh
- Leigh baronets

Parliament of Great Britain
Preceded by William Pochin; George Legh-Keck	Member of Parliament for Leicestershire; 1798–1801; With: Sir Edmund Cradock-Hartopp, 1st Baronet	Succeeded by Parliament of the United Kingdom
Parliament of the United Kingdom
Preceded by Parliament of Great Britain	Member of Parliament for Leicestershire; 1806 – 1831; With: Sir Edmund Cradock-Hartopp, 1st Baronet 1798–1801; Lord Robert Manners 1806–1818, 1820–1831	Succeeded by Charles March-Phillipps; Thomas Paget
