= Thomas Calley =

Thomas Calley may refer to:

- Thomas Calley (politician), MP for Cricklade 1812–18 and 1831–35
- Thomas Calley (British Army officer), British Army general and MP for Cricklade in 1910
