= Thomas Bennet (lawyer) =

English lawyer (1592–1670)

- Born: 5 December 1592; York, England
- Died: 27 June 1670 (aged 77)
- Occupation: Lawyer
- Spouses: Charlotte Harrison; Thomasine Dethick
- Children: Mary and another daughter (by first marriage); Thomas (by second marriage)
- Parent(s): Sir John Bennet; Anne Weeks/Bennet

Thomas Bennet (5 December 1592 – 27 June 1670) was a successful civil lawyer.

== Life ==
Thomas Bennet was born in York, but the Bennet family appears to have come from the south of England. His father was Sir John Bennet, a wealthy politician and judge whose career had ended prematurely when he was found guilty of taking bribes. John Bennett had ten children and forty grandchildren. One of Thomas's nephews was the first Earl of Arlington. Thomas was the judge's second son, but on the evidence of his own wealth at the time of his death, he was more successful than his elder brother. Thomas Bennet's mother was Anne Weeks/Bennet, the first of his father's two wives. Although both his father and his son sat as members of the English Parliament, Thomas Bennet did not.

== Legal education and career ==
Bennet entered All Souls College, Oxford in 1613, and emerging with a qualification in Law in 1615. He received his Doctorate of Law on 3 July 1624. By that time he was a member of Gray's Inn, to which he "may have been admitted in 1617". He joined the Doctors' Commons (lawyers' society) in 1624, becoming a full member of it in 1626. He gained admission to the College of Advocates on 26 January 1626. While he was making his career in advocacy, he also found time to serve as a Commissioner for Piracy in London in 1633, 1635 and again in 1638.

On 8 June 1635 Thomas Bennet became a Master in Chancery, which post he held until his death.

== English Civil War ==
Sources suggest that during the English Civil War that engulfed England in the middle of the century, his sympathies may have tended to the royalist cause, and that he might have been among those expelled from Oxford following the parliamentarian purge of the city in the later 1640s. However, as far as is known Thomas Bennet was able to avoid incurring destructive wrath from the republican leadership which took over the reins of power following the execution of the king early in 1649. Throughout the Commonwealth years Bennet retained his post as Master in Chancery.

The nation underwent further régime change in May 1660 when the republic was replaced by monarchy. Thomas Bennet was knighted on 21 August 1661. His cousin, Sir Thomas Bennet of Cambridgeshire, had already been created a baronet the previous year.

== Death and legacy ==
It was presumably in connection with his cousin, Sir Thomas Bennet of Babraham in Cambridgeshire, that by the time he died, the lawyer Thomas Bennet was himself recorded as being in possession of "a seat" at "Baberham" (sic). Nevertheless, when he died on 27 June 1670 he was living in the south of England on his estate at Salthrop in Wiltshire. It is thought that he had been predeceased by his daughter Thomasine. He was, however, survived by the daughter of his first marriage, Mary, who had no children, and by the son of his second marriage, Thomas.
