= Listed buildings in Heskin =

Heskin is a civil parish in the Borough of Chorley, Lancashire, England. It contains 17 buildings that are recorded in the National Heritage List for England as designated listed buildings. Of these, one is listed at Grade I, the highest of the three grades, one is at Grade II*, the middle grade, and the others are at Grade II, the lowest grade. The parish is almost completely rural, and most of the listed buildings are, or originated as, farmhouses and farm buildings. The other listed buildings are large houses and associated structures, and a cottage.

== Key ==
Grade	Criteria
I	Buildings of exceptional interest, sometimes considered to be internationally important
II*	Particularly important buildings of more than special interest
II	Buildings of national importance and special interest

== Buildings ==
Name and location	Photograph	Date	Notes	Grade
Barn, Old Heskin Hall Farm; 53.63435°N 2.73693°W	—	16th century (probable)	A cruck-framed barn on a high sandstone plinth, with cladding partly in brick and partly in corrugated asbestos sheet, and with some weatherboarding. Inside the barn are five full cruck trusses.	II
Barmskin Hall Farmhouse; 53.62335°N 2.72681°W	—	Late 16th or early 17th century (probable)	A former farmhouse in sandstone with a slate roof. It has two storeys and a symmetrical two-bay front. In the centre is a massive stone doorway above which is an illegible datestone. On the right side of the house is a blocked mullioned window with a hood mould. The other windows contain altered glazing.	II
Heskin Hall; 53.63518°N 2.71865°W		Late 16th or early 17th century (probable)	A manor house, extended in the 19th century, in red brick with blue diapering, sandstone dressings, and a blue slate roof. It has two storeys with attics, and is in an L-shaped plan with a main range and a northeast wing at the rear. On the front are five unequal gables, three canted bay windows, and a Tudor arched doorway. At the east end is a three-storey stair turret. The northeast wing has three gabled bays.	I
Anderton's School House; 53.62778°N 2.72802°W		17th century (or earlier)	A cruck-framed rendered cottage with a thatched roof. It has two small bays and is in a single storey. On the front is a porch and three casement windows. Inside is a full cruck truss.	II
Howe Brook House Farmhouse; 53.63202°N 2.72464°W	—	17th century (or earlier)	The farmhouse was extended in the middle of the 18th century. The earlier part is timber-framed on a high sandstone plinth, and the later part is in brick on a stone base. The roofs are in slate and in stone-slate, and the house has two storeys with attics. The earlier part has an L-shaped plan, and the newer part forms a cross-wing with two bays.	II*
Barn, Howe Brook House Farm; 53.63192°N 2.72496°W	—	17th century (or earlier)	The barn is partly timber-framed on a stone plinth, partly in stone, and partly in brick, and it has a stone-slate roof. The timber-framed section is mainly weatherboarded. The barn contains opposed wagon entrances and ventilation slits.	II
Hampson's Farmhouse; 53.62754°N 2.72799°W	—	17th century	A former farmhouse in sandstone with some brick and a stone-slate roof in two storeys. The original part has two bays and a gabled porch on the front. The ground floor contains windows with large lintels, and elsewhere there are sliding sash windows. A single-bay cottage was added to the left in the 18th century, and an extension to the rear in the 19th century. Inside the house is an inglenook, a bressumer, and a timber-framed partition.	II
Craggs Farmhouse; 53.62283°N 2.72514°W	—	1662	The farmhouse is in sandstone with a red tiled roof. It has a T-shaped plan, is in two storeys, originally with two bays, and third bay added later, and a rear wing. On the front is a single-story gabled porch with an inscribed lintel. The windows include one with mullions, and a sliding sash window.	II
Gate piers, Heskin Hall; 53.63630°N 2.71437°W	—	Late 17th century (possible)	The two gate piers are at the entrance to the drive to the hall. They are in stone, square, in Renaissance style, and about 3 metres (9.8 ft) high. They have panelled pedestals and pillars, moulded cornices, fluted friezes, and egg-and-dart bands. At the top are moulded caps with pedestals for former finials, now missing.	II
Martin House Farmhouse; 53.61951°N 2.71206°W	—	Late 17th century	A sandstone farmhouse with a stone-slate roof, a continuous outshut at the rear, and a granary wing at the left. The main part has two bays, with two storeys at the front and one at the back. On the front is a porch and a Tudor arched doorway. Some of the windows are mullioned, and others are sliding sashes. The granary wing has one bay, two storeys, and an external staircase leading to a loft door. In the house are an inglenook, a bressumer and timber-framed walls with wattle and daub infill.	II
Stanley Wives Farmhouse; 53.62883°N 2.70820°W	—	Late 17th century (probable)	The former farmhouse is mainly cruck-framed on a sandstone plinth with brick cladding and is in 1 1/2 storeys. It has three bays, the third bay having been rebuilt in brick as a cross-wing with two storeys. The roof is in stone-slate. In the left gable wall is an exposed cruck truss with a tie-beam. Inside the original part are more remains of the cruck structure.	II
Barn, Swift's Farm; 53.62309°N 2.73259°W	—	1698	A sandstone barn with an asbestos sheet roof, it has five bays and an aisle. The barn contains opposed wagon entrances, doorways, a first-floor loading door, ventilation slits, windows, and an external flight of steps to a loft door.	II
Barn, Hampson's Farm; 53.62734°N 2.72801°W	—	Late 17th or early 18th century (probable)	A farm building, later extended, in sandstone with a sheeted roof, and two outshuts at the rear. The barn contains a wagon entrance, various doorways, a round pitching hole, and ventilation slits.	II
Swift's Farmhouse; 53.62297°N 2.73230°W	—	1739	A brick farmhouse with a slate roof, in two storeys with attics, and with a symmetrical two-bay front. On the front is a central doorway and four sash windows. Above the doorway is a blind window over which is a datestone. Elsewhere are altered windows, and at the rear is a single-storey service wing.	II
Pyebrook Hall; 53.62859°N 2.71535°W	—	1822	A sandstone house with a pyramidal slate roof, with two storeys in symmetrical Classical style. It has a rectangular plan, with a service wing at the rear. On the front is a Tuscan porch with four columns, a cornice, and a plain parapet. The doorway is round-headed with a keystone and a fanlight. The windows are sashes. There is a modern porch on the right side.	II
Barn, Pyebrook Hall; 53.62842°N 2.71566°W	—	Early 19th century (probable)	The barn is in sandstone with a slate roof, and has a symmetrical rectangular three-bay plan. In the centre is an elliptical-headed wagon entrance with a keystone and a curved canopy. Elsewhere there are doorways, two pitching holes, two owl holes, and ventilation slits.	II
Heskin Old Hall Farmhouse; 53.63417°N 2.73759°W	—	Early 19th century	A sandstone farmhouse with a roof partly slated and partly tiled. It is symmetrical with a square plan and is in two storeys. There is a central round-headed doorway with imposts and a keystone, behind which is a recessed porch. The windows are sashes, some of which are horizontally-sliding.	II
