= Salthrop House =

- Location within Wiltshire

General information
- Architectural style: Georgian
- Location: Wroughton, Wiltshire, England
- Coordinates: 51.5203°N 1.8311°W
- Completed: 1795

Salthrop House is a country house about 2 miles (3.2 km) west of the village of Wroughton, Wiltshire, in England. It is Grade II listed on the National Heritage List for England. There was a large house on the site in the early 17th century. The present house was built c.1795 in the style of James Wyatt; it has two storeys, faced in ashlar, with a two-story bow on the front (west) elevation.

Salthrop is within the Basset Down Estate which today is known for its golf course.

== Ownership history ==
In 1086 a small settlement of twelve households was recorded at Salthorp in Domesday Book. Until the 14th century the manor was held together with the Castle Combe estates. Later it passed through many hands including Thomas Bennet (1592–1670), a lawyer; and Peter Legh of Lyme Park (formerly of Bank Hall, Bretherton, Lancashire), who married Martha Bennet. His daughter Elizabeth Legh, widow of Anthony Keck (c.1740–1782), inherited the hall and their daughter married into the Calley family of Burderop Park, Wiltshire. John James Calley (d.1854) sold the manor to the Duke of Wellington whose son sold it to the Story-Maskelyne family in 1861.
