= Horatio Powys-Keck =

English cricketer

Cricket information
- Bowling: Left-arm fast

Career statistics
Competition	First-class
Matches	9
Runs scored	69
Batting average	7.66
100s/50s	0/0
Top score	25*
Balls bowled	824
Wickets	23
Bowling average	19.08
5 wickets in innings	1
10 wickets in match	0
Best bowling	5/27
Catches/stumpings	0/–
- Source: Cricinfo, 7 November 2022

Horatio James Powys-Keck (7 March 1873 – 30 January 1952) was an English first-class cricketer who played nine matches between 1903 and 1907.

Born in Hyères, France and educated at Monkton Combe School, Powys-Keck's debut came for Oxford University Authentics on their tour of India in 1902–03. The team played three games (the only first-class matches they ever played) and Powys-Keck was chosen for the first of these, against Gentlemen of India at the Polo Ground, Delhi. This was the only first-class match ever played at this location; originally scheduled for Queen's Park Gardens in the same city it was moved because the ground was too small and the wicket too bad. In this game, Powys-Keck took seven wickets: 2–30 in the first innings (his maiden victim being Kenneth Goldie), and 5-27 (which was to remain his career best) in the second.

In June 1903 Powys-Keck made his first County Championship appearance, playing for Worcestershire against Hampshire, scoring a useful 25 from number nine in the first innings and picking up two wickets. He played one other match for the county that season, against Somerset in early July, scoring 0 not out in his only innings and bowling ten overs for 35 runs without taking a wicket.

In 1904–05, Powys-Keck was chosen for Lord Brackley's tour of the West Indies. He played five matches on this tour between January and April 1905, scoring 37 runs at 7.40 and taking 12 wickets at 19.41; his best bowling was 4–24 against British Guiana in early March, in a match that also saw him make the highest score of his career, an unbeaten 25, despite his batting at the bottom of the order.

After his return to England, Powys-Keck played just one more first-class game, for Worcestershire against Oxford University in late May 1907. In a somewhat symmetrical display, in each innings he took a single wicket (both bowled) and scored a single run.

In 1930 he changed his name to Horatio James Powys. He died in Notting Hill, London at the age of 78.

His great-uncle Arthur Crichton played one game for Marylebone Cricket Club (MCC) in 1856.
