= Thomas Peter Legh =

British Member of Parliament

Thomas Peter Legh KJ
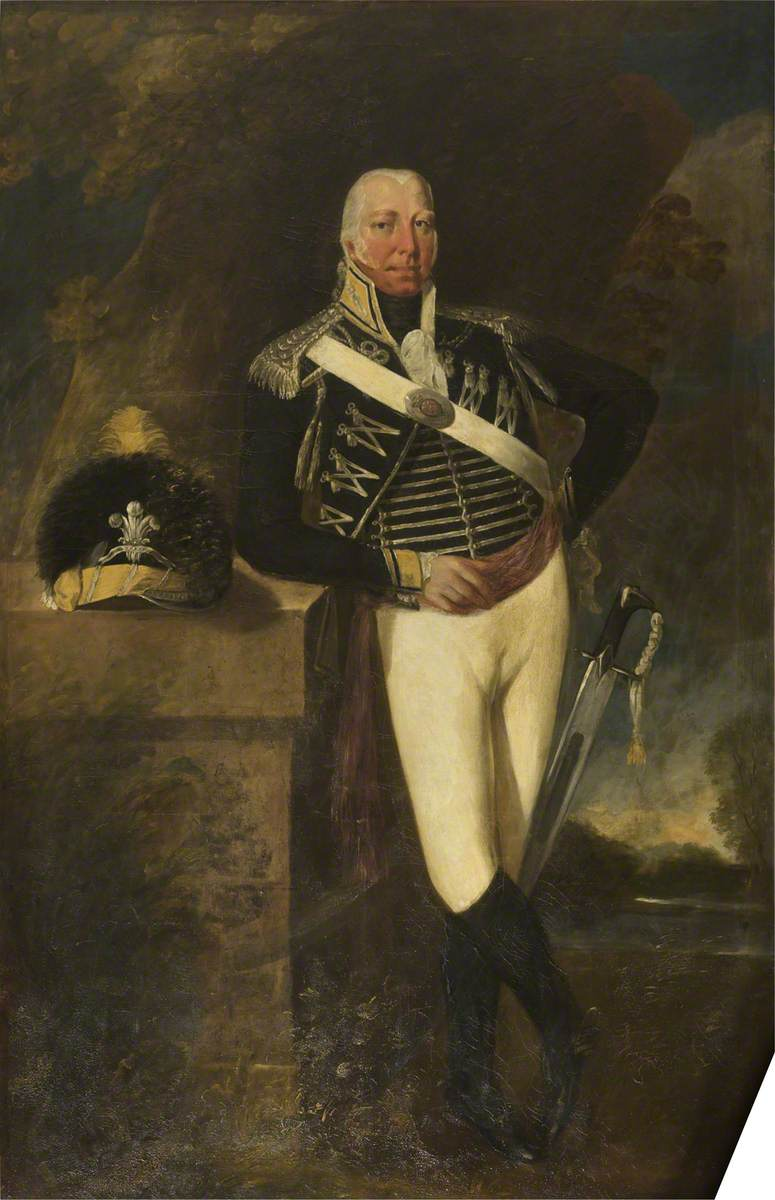
- Legh in his cavalry uniform c.1795

Member of Parliament for Newton
- In office 1780–1797

Personal details
- Born: c.1754
- Died: 7 August 1797
- Education: Brasenose College, Oxford
- Awards: Knight of the Order of Saint Joachim

Military service
- Allegiance: Kingdom of Great Britain
- Branch/service: British Army
- Years of service: 1794–1797
- Rank: Colonel
- Commands: Lancashire Fencible Cavalry

Thomas Peter Legh (1754–1797), was a British Member of Parliament.

Born about 1754 he was the first son of Reverend Ashburnham Legh of Golborne and Charlotte Elizabeth Legh née Egerton.

He was educated at Brasenose College, Oxford.

In 1794 he spent over £20,000 raising a regiment of fencible cavalry, The Lancashire Fencible Cavalry, to which he was appointed Colonel. (Note: £20,000 would be approximately £2.15 million in 2019 "Five Ways to Compute the Relative Value of a UK Pound Amount, 1270 to Present". MeasuringWorth. 2018.)

Legh was Member of Parliament (MP) for the rotten borough of Newton in Lancashire from 1780 until his death in 1797.

He died on 7 August 1797 leaving seven illegitimate children and his estates to his eldest son, Thomas Legh.

== Notes ==
Parliament of the United Kingdom
Preceded by Anthony James Keck; Robert Vernon Atherton Gwillym	Member of Parliament for Newton; 1780 – 1797; With: Thomas Davenport, KC 1780 - 1786; Thomas Brooke 1786 - 1797	Succeeded by Thomas Langford Brooke; Thomas Brooke
