= Walter Powys =

English cricketer

Personal information
- Full name: Walter Norman Powys
- Born: 28 July 1849; Titchmarsh, Northamptonshire, England
- Died: 7 January 1892 (aged 42); Nottingham, Nottinghamshire, England
- Height: 5 ft 11 in (1.80 m)
- Batting: Left-handed
- Bowling: Left-arm roundarm fast
- Relatives: Arthur Powys (brother); Richard Powys (brother); Arthur Crichton (uncle)

Domestic team information
- Years: Team
- 1871–1874: Cambridge University
- 1877–1878: Hampshire
- 1877–1879: Marylebone Cricket Club

Career statistics
Competition	First-class
Matches	27
Runs scored	244
Batting average	6.97
100s/50s	–/–
Top score	30
Balls bowled	3,163
Wickets	98
Bowling average	14.44
5 wickets in innings	6
10 wickets in match	3
Best bowling	9/42
Catches/stumpings	9/–
- Source: Cricinfo, 14 June 2022

Walter Norman Powys (28 July 1849 — 7 January 1892) was an English first-class cricketer. He played mostly for Cambridge University Cricket Club in first-class cricket and was most renowned for his exploits on his first-class debut, when he took 13 wickets, which included innings figures of 9 for 42. These remain as of 2023 the fifth-best innings bowling figures on debut in first-class cricket.

== First-class cricket and life ==
Powys was the son of The Honourable and Reverend Atherton Legh Powys and Charlotte Elizabeth Norman, he was born in July 1849 at Titchmarsh, Northamptonshire. After being privately educated, he matriculated to Pembroke College, Cambridge in 1870; his academic studies were characterised by interruptions, with him being readmitted to the university in 1874 and 1877, finally graduating in 1879. Powys was a member of the Cambridge University Cricket Club and made his debut in first-class cricket for the club against the Marylebone Cricket Club at Fenner's in 1871. He played first-class cricket for Cambridge until 1874, making eighteen appearances. These included three appearances in The University Matches of 1871, 1872 and 1874, taking 24 wickets in these matches with his left-arm roundarm fast bowling. In his eighteen appearances for Cambridge, he took a total of 78 wickets at an average of 11.42; he took a five wicket haul on five occasions and twice took ten wickets in a match. His best innings figures of 9 for 42 came on debut against the Marylebone Cricket Club in 1871; these figures rank as the fifth-best innings bowling figures on debut in first-class cricket. He was described by the magazine Cricket as a bowler who bowled at terrific pace. He was the honorary secretary of Cambridge University Cricket Club in 1873, a season in which he did not feature for Cambridge due to commitments in the United States.

Powys also played first-class cricket for a number of other teams, including the Gentlemen of the North in 1871, for the Gentlemen in the 1872 Gentlemen v Players fixture, for the MCC on three occasions from 1877 to 1879 (and for their gentlemen's team in 1872), and for the Orleans Club against the touring Australians in 1878. He also played first-class matches for Hampshire, having qualified to play for the county through residency (his father was a Reverend in Southsea, Hampshire). However, he only made two appearances for Hampshire, against Derbyshire at Southampton in 1877 and Kent at Tunbridge Wells in 1878. His overall tally of first-class wickets was 98 at an average of 14.44, with six five wicket hauls and three ten wicket hauls in a match. Wisden described him as "one of the best amateur fast bowlers in England".

Whilst at Cambridge, Powys studied law and was admitted to Lincoln's Inn in 1878, however he was not called to the bar. He instead went into business in Nottingham. Owing to ill-health, Powys spent sometime in the United States on medical advice, but returned invalided. He died at Nottingham on 7 January 1892, leaving behind a widow, Ada, whom he had married in March 1880. His brother's, Arthur and Richard, also played first-class cricket, as did his uncle, Arthur Crichton.
