= Thomas Calley (politician) =

British landowner and politician

Thomas Calley (31 May 1780 – 17 September 1863) was a British landowner and politician, who represented Cricklade in Parliament from 1812 to 1818 and 1831 to 1834.

Calley was born on 31 May 1780, the eldest son of Thomas Browne Calley, a member of an established gentry family resident at Burderop Park for several centuries. He inherited his father's estates in 1791, was educated at St. John's College, Cambridge, and in 1801 commissioned in the Wiltshire Yeomanry. He married Elizabeth Keck, daughter of Anthony James Keck, in 1802. Prior to entering politics, he lived as "an unremarkable country gentleman", and was made High Sheriff of Wiltshire in 1807–8.

He expressed an interest in representing the borough of Cricklade at a by-election in 1811, when Lord Porchester succeeded his father and entered the House of Lords, but was persuaded to stand at the following general election instead. He did so, and was returned unopposed as a supporter of the government in the 1812 general election. Later in the Parliament he began to vote occasionally with the opposition. He was defeated at the 1818 general election, which cost him almost £5,000 in expenses, and caused his bankruptcy. His election agent described him as a type of politician who "don't mind how much money is spent ... [but] find it not convenient to pay it." He was forced to let Burderop and moved to Salthrop House, his mother-in-law's residence; on her death in 1826 the estates were inherited by his wife Elizabeth.

He remained politically active through the 1820s, increasingly conservative; he was a senior freemason in the county, signed an anti-Catholic declaration, and supported a testimonial thanking the yeomanry for suppressing the Swing Riots. At the 1831 general election, the anti-reform Tory Joseph Pitt stood down in Cricklade and Calley was selected as his replacement. He cautiously supported reform "to an extent which should satisfy all reasonable men", "dictated by prudence and moderation", but promised to defend the representation of Cricklade as it now stood. He was elected in second place, behind a reformer candidate.

In the following Parliament, he did support the reform bill, having "arrived at the conviction that no honest man ought to refuse his assent to it". In the 1832 general election he was returned as a liberal, and remained in Parliament until he stood down at dissolution in December 1834.

Calley died in Württemberg in September 1836. His wife had died in April 1832, after a rumoured separation due to ill-treatment, and both their estates were inherited by their surviving son, John James Calley (1810-1854).
