= Frederick Powys =

English cricketer

Frederick Henry Yelverton Powys (22 July 1808 – 14 January 1863) was an English cricketer who was associated with Cambridge University and made his debut in 1830.

Powys was a grandson of Thomas Powys, 1st Baron Lilford. He studied at Emmanuel College, Cambridge, and after graduating became a Church of England priest, but he held no cure or benefice.

== Bibliography ==
- Haygarth, Arthur (1996) [1862]. Scores & Biographies, Volume 1 (1744–1826). Kennington: Frederick Lillywhite. ISBN 978-19-00592-23-9.
- Haygarth, Arthur (1997) [1862]. Scores & Biographies, Volume 2 (1827–1840). Kennington: Frederick Lillywhite. ISBN 978-19-00592-23-9.
