= List of parks in Warrington =

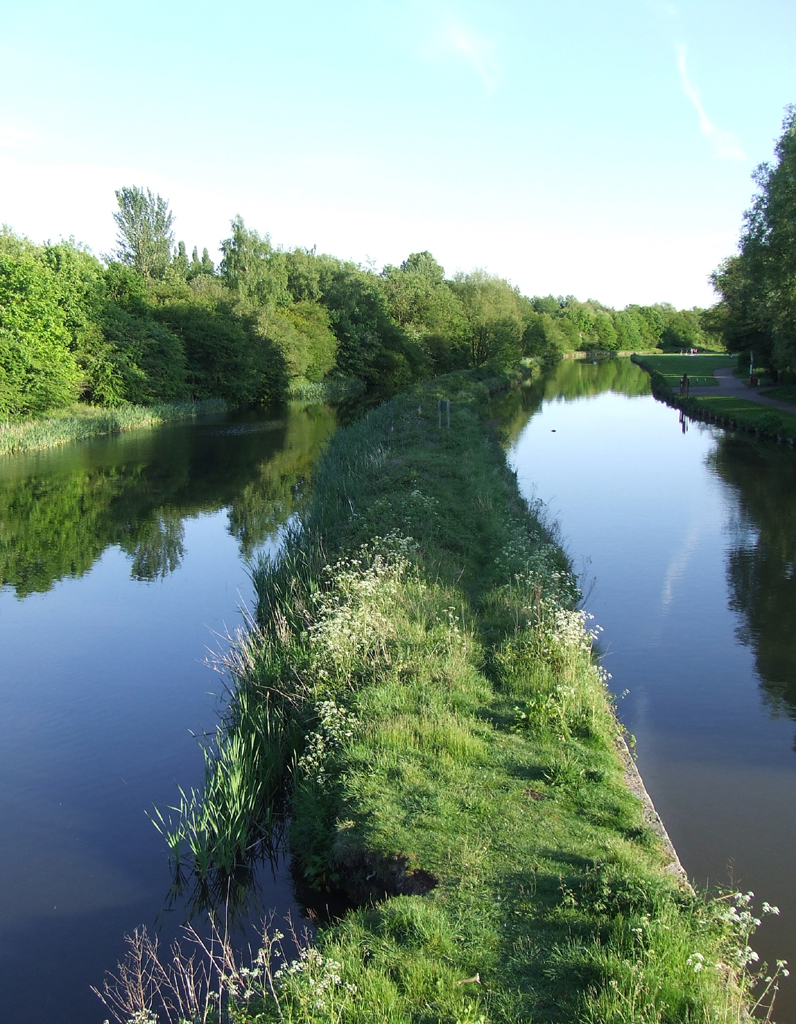
Sankey Brook (left) and Sankey Canal (right) within Sankey Valley Park

Here is a list of parks and areas of natural interest in Warrington, England.

- Alexandra Park (Stockton Heath)
- Bank Park
- Birchwood Forest Park
- Black Bear Park (Latchford)
- Brickfields Park (Orford)
- Bruche Park
- Burtonwood Nature Park
- Centre Park
- Culcheth Linear Park
- Lumb Brook Valley
- Lymm Dam
- New Cut Heritage and Ecology Park
- Orford Park
- Paddington Meadows
- Peel Hall Park
- Ridgway Grundy Memorial Park (Lymm)
- Risley Moss
- Rixton Clay Pits
- Sankey Valley Park
- St Elphin's Park
- St. Peter's Park
- The Twiggeries
- Trans Pennine Trail
- Turkey Pond Park
- Victoria Park
- Walton Hall and Gardens
- Woolston Park

== See also ==
- List of parks and open spaces in Cheshire
- List of Sites of Special Scientific Interest in Cheshire
