= Sankey Valley Park =

Park in Warrington, Cheshire, England

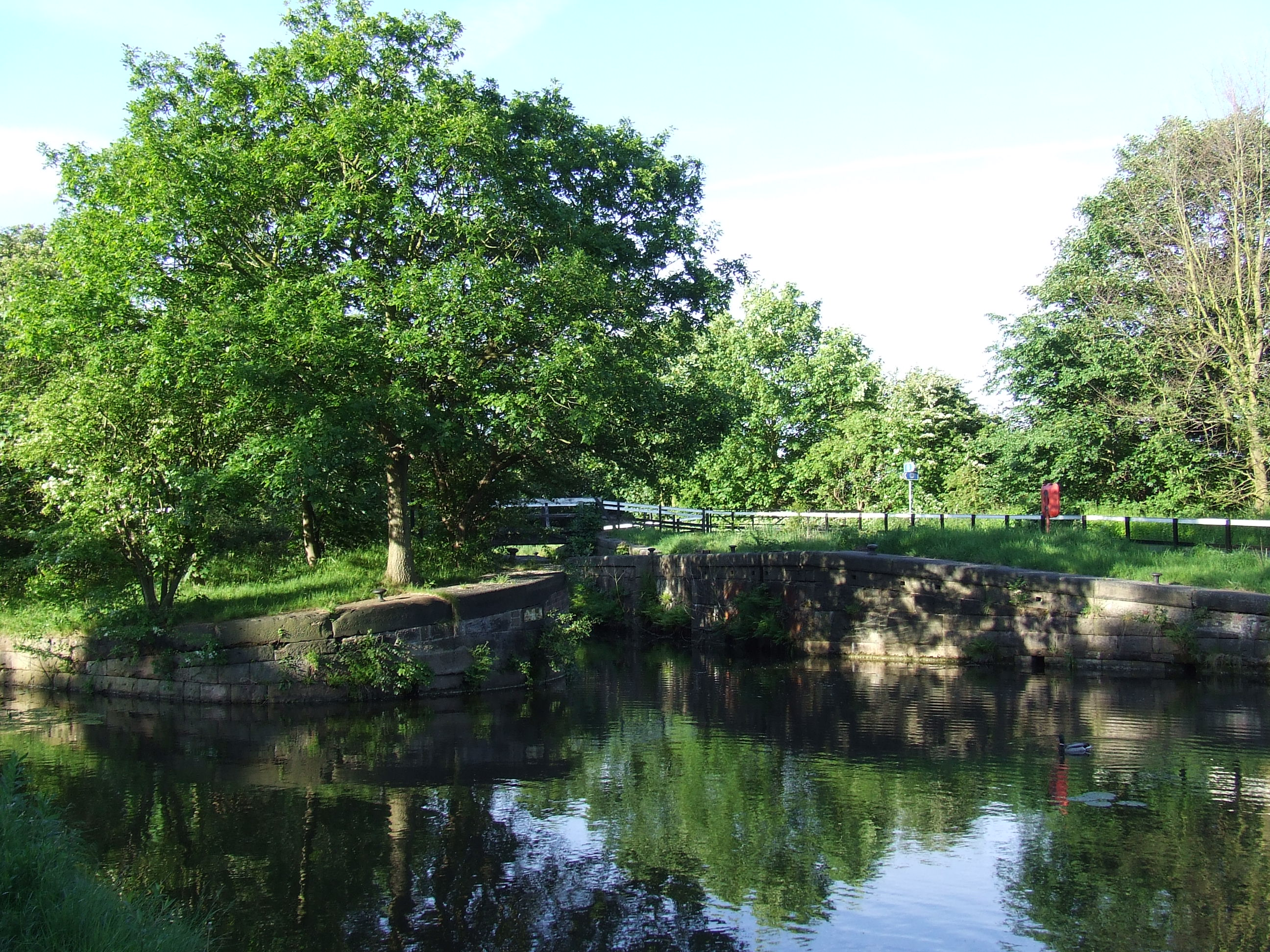
- Part of the Sankey Canal in Sankey Valley Park

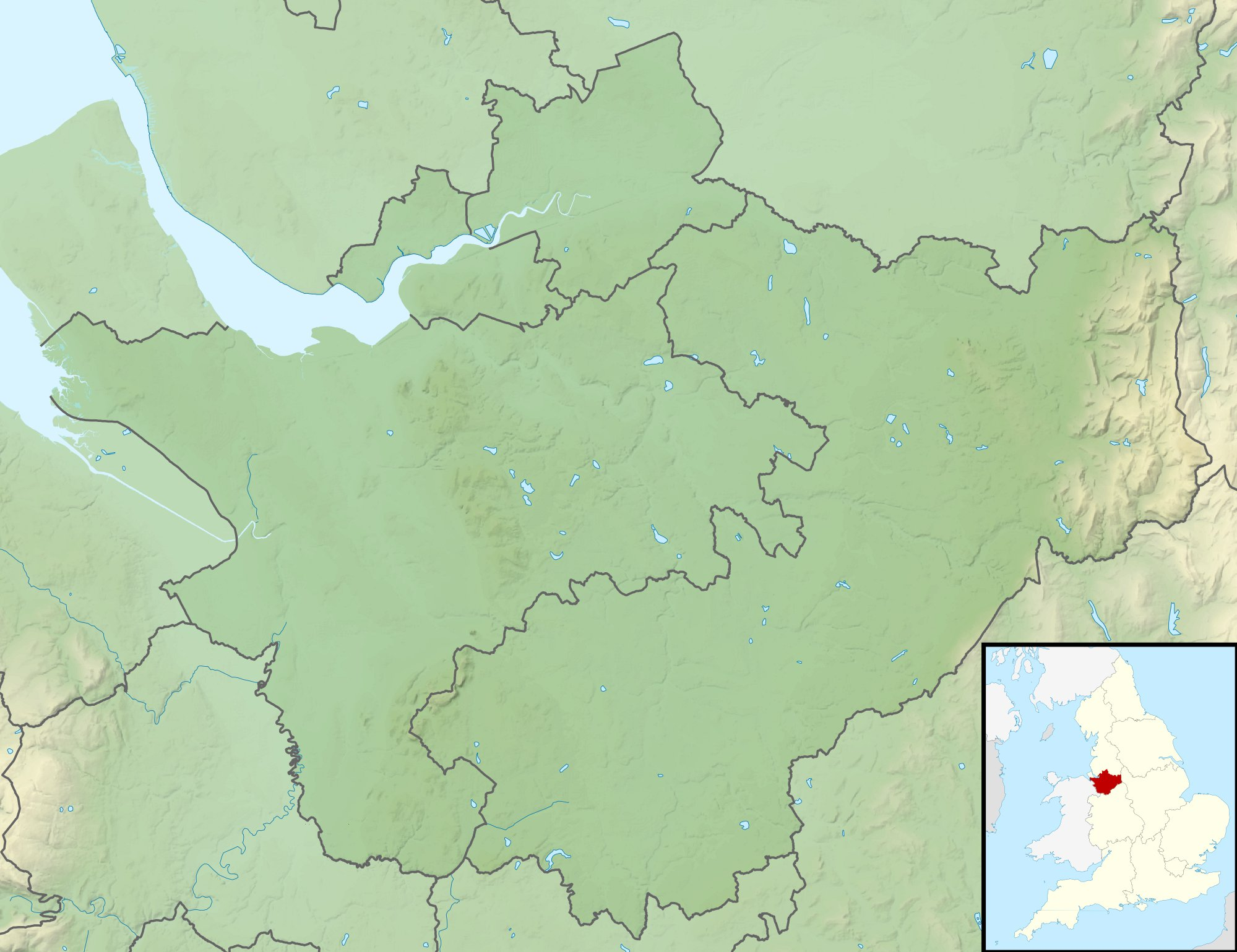
- Location within Cheshire
- Type: Public park/Nature reserve
- Location: Warrington, UK
- Coordinates: 53°24′08″N 2°36′51″W
- Operator: Warrington Borough Council,
- Status: Open all year

Sankey Valley Park is a public park in Warrington, Cheshire. It occupies part of the Sankey Valley and the main park itself covers over 1½ miles between Sankey Bridges in the south and Callands in the north. The valley follows the course of Sankey Brook and the now disused Sankey Canal. The park is enjoyed by walkers, cyclists and anglers and the central section of the park is family orientated with children's play features, a maze and lawned areas. Bewsey Old Hall sits on the edge of the central section of the park. The Trans Pennine Trail passes around 500 yards (460 m) from the southern tip of the park.

== History ==
Sankey Valley follows the course of England's first canal, Sankey Canal, and stretches for 15 miles (24 km) from St Helens through Warrington to Widnes. The canal was opened in 1757 to carry coal from the mines around the St Helens area to the markets of Liverpool and Cheshire, it pioneered the canal age. The canal was responsible for shaping the valley, its environment and development from the late 18th century to the early 20th century.

With the advent of the railways began the long decline of the canals but the stretch of the Sankey canal that now occupies Sankey Valley Park remained open until 1963. Today the local authorities of Warrington, St Helens and Halton along with the Sankey Canal Restoration Society, are developing the Sankey Canal Trail as a 15-mile (24 km) greenway either side of the park, whilst working towards the restoration of a navigation route.

On the western side of the park lies Bewsey Old Hall. Before the Hall was built, a monastic grange existed on the site. A hall was first built on the site by William Fitz Almeric le Boteler. The Hall and estate was home to the Lords of Warrington from the 13th century for many generations. The current hall is a three-storey, mostly Jacobean building. It has distinctive chimneys and stone mullion windows which are most likely the work of Sir Thomas Ireland and date back to around 1600. Sir Thomas was knighted at Bewsey by King James I in 1617. Later additions to the Hall include a farmhouse and kitchen, dating from the 18th century and 19th century with earlier foundations. The original 14th-century moat only partly holds water today.

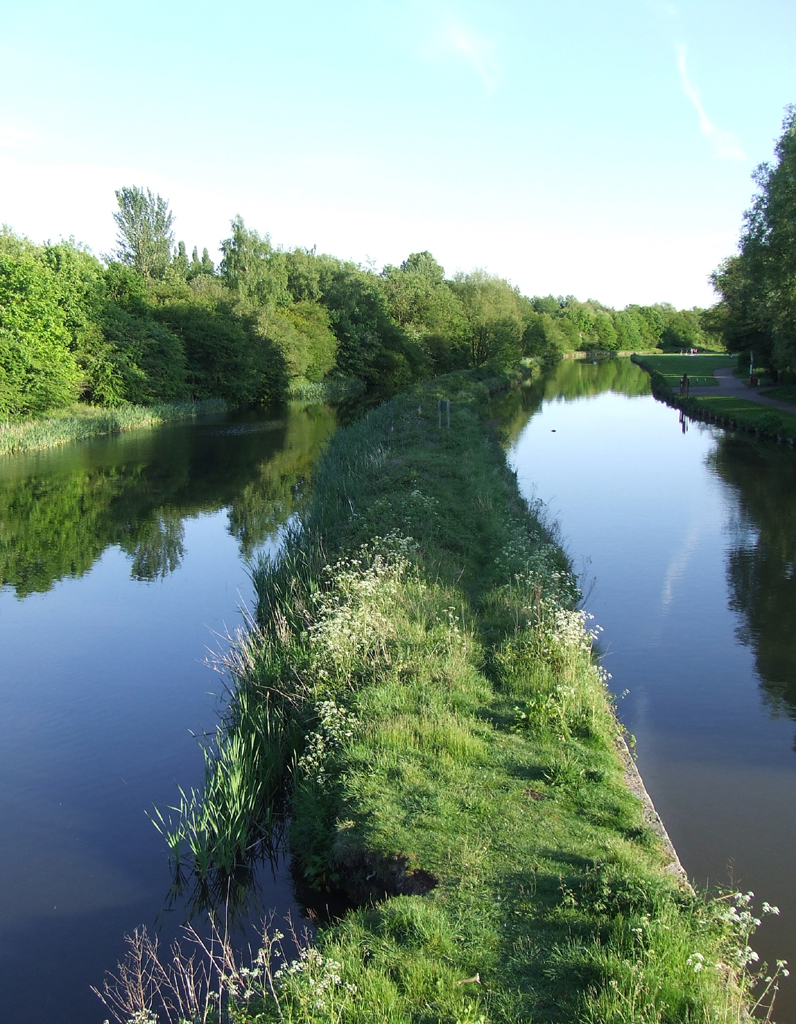
Sankey Brook (left) and Sankey Canal (right) within Sankey Valley Park

== The park ==
The park is largely linear, following a stretch of Sankey Brook and the old Sankey Canal. In several places the park opens up into open, lawned areas and features such as a hedge maze, a meadow, mature woodland and a wetland nature reserve. One main asphalt footpath stretches the length of the park whilst several narrower paths split from the main path in the wider spaces of the park. The central section of the park is family orientated with children's play features and picnic areas. A ranger service operated by Warrington Borough Council used to patrol the park, but this has since been disbanded.

Angling is permitted in certain parts of the park; for Stanners Pool and St Helens Canal fishing rights are reserved for Dallam and District Community Angling Group. The Sankey Canal is available for day fishing. Mary Ann's, Brownlees and Whitegate ponds are leased to Penketh and Old Hall Angling Club for members' fishing.

Canoeing is permitted on the Sankey Canal.

== Wildlife and nature ==
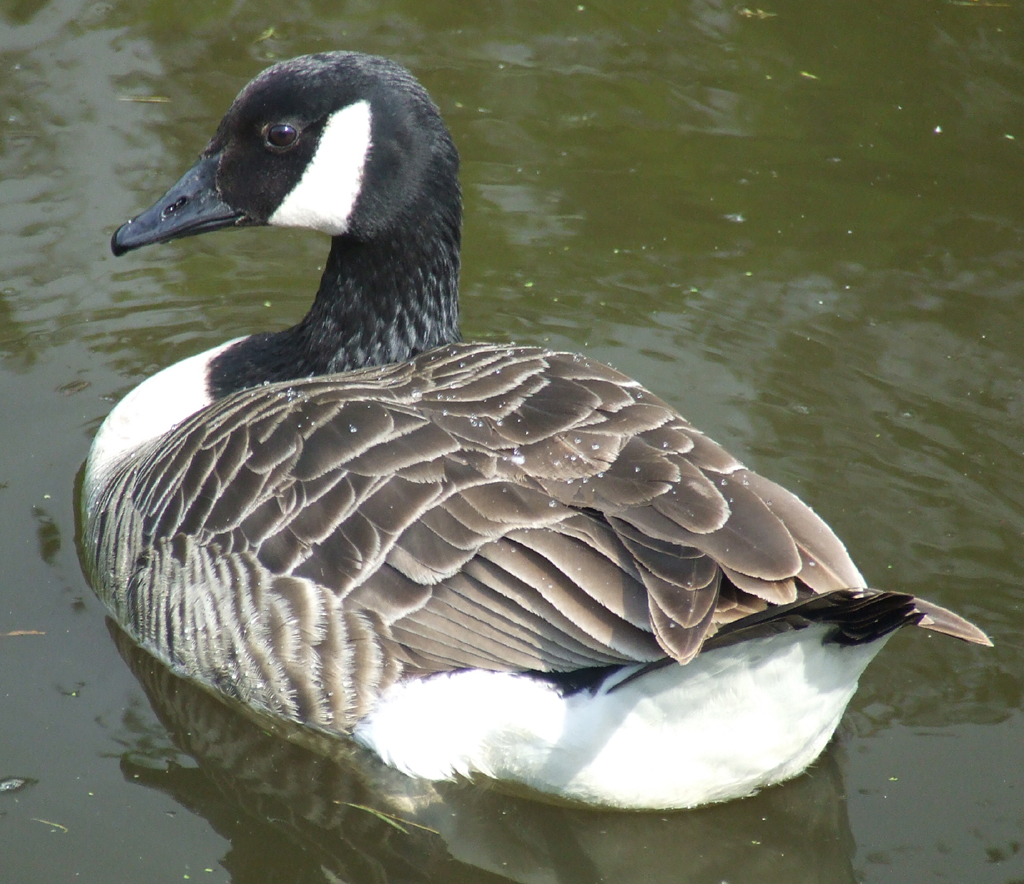
Canada goose on Sankey Canal, Sankey Valley Park

An array of wildlife can be found in the park. Diurnal creatures include squirrels, swans, butterflies and woodland birds. Nocturnal inhabitants include foxes, owls, mice, hedgehogs and bats. More rarely seen species such as stoats and weasels, treecreepers, great spotted woodpeckers, kingfishers, water voles and reed bunting have all been spotted in the park. Amphibians populating the park include common frogs, common toads and smooth newts.

In late spring, orchids can be found in the meadow, whilst a wealth of butterflies visit during the summer. Most of the mature woodlands within the Valley are owned by the Woodland Trust who safeguard woods within the landscape, protect habitats for the benefit of wildlife and encourage public access and enjoyment. The woods are particularly picturesque around spring, when an assortment of wild flowers can be seen, and during the autumn leaf falls. A variety of water plants, animals and birds can be seen on or around the park's many ponds, Sankey Brook, the Wetland Nature Reserve or the Canal.

== See also ==
- List of parks in Warrington
