= Heskin Hall =

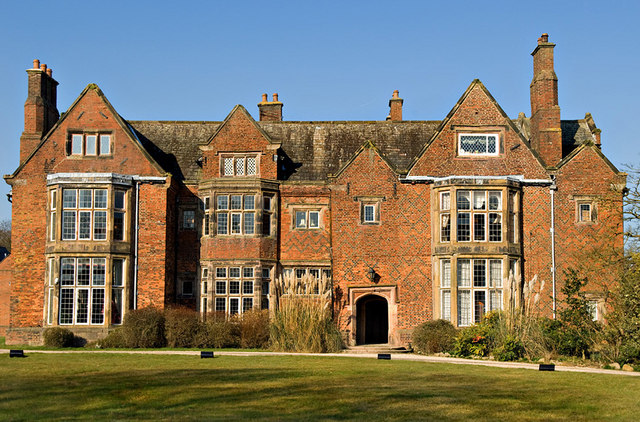

- Location within the Borough of Chorley
- 53.6352°N 2.7187°W
- Location: Heskin, Lancashire, England

Listed Building – Grade I
- Designated: 22 October 1952
- Reference no.: 1164441

Listed Building – Grade II
- Official name: Gate piers at entrance to drive to Heskin Hall
- Designated: 17 April 1967
- Reference no.: 1362098

Heskin Hall is a manor house in Heskin, Lancashire, England. Construction began on the present hall in 1545 making it a Tudor building which has been designated a Grade I listed building by Historic England.

== History ==
In 1506 the lands were sold to Edmund Dudley who was Minister for king Henry VII. Dudley was executed by the king for treason and the land passed to his widow Elizabeth who later married Arthur Plantagenet. The land passed to John Dudley, 1st Duke of Northumberland, in 1511, who was later executed by Queen Mary, and his son Robert Dudley, 1st Earl of Leicester, was a favourite of Elizabeth I. In 1556 the estate was bought by Richard Molyneux who also bought lands from Mary Seymour, the widow of Thomas Seymour who was the father of Jane Seymour (wife of Henry the VIII).

Following the death of Richard Molyneux in 1568 the estate passed to his son William. The house remained the home of the Molyneux family until 1739 when it became a seat of the Mawdesley family, but was sold in 1744 to Alexander Kershaw. Alexander Kershaw never married and died in 1788, his will acknowledged three children, Edmund Newman Kershaw, John Copper and James Kershaw. Edmund being the eldest child inherited his father's estate which later passed to his brother John Copper when he died. John died in 1833 like his brother, without any children causing a legal dispute. It was the heirs of Mary Scott (née Kershaw) who was sister of Alexander Kershaw that won the legal title of legitimate heir.

In 1885, it was purchased by Henry Rawcliffe of Gillibrand Hall. Lord Lilford was the last person to occupy the house with Lady Lilford (his fourth wife) who was an ex-dancer and actress. They divorced in 1969 and Lady Lilford gained the Heskin Estate as part of the divorce settlement. It was later occupied by Blackburn College as a training centre, followed by Moben Kitchens as offices and sales training purposes, before its present use as an antique centre which opened in 1995.

== Architecture ==
The present house although has a date of 1670 on the front wall, was first constructed in 1545 of red brick with blue diapering and sandstone dressings. The roofs are blue slate. It has an L-shaped plan and is on three storeys. The south-facing front façade has gables, and is asymmetrical. There is a spout head on this front wall bearing the date 1679 and the initials of Alexander Mawdesley.

The house has been designated a Grade I listed building on the National Heritage List for England database since 1952. The Grade I designation—the highest of the three grades—is for buildings "of exceptional interest, sometimes considered to be internationally important". Hartwell and Pevsner (2009) describe it as "a very interesting house".

== Ghosts ==
There are said to be numerous ghosts that inhabit the hall. Two are believed to date from the English Civil War, which took place in the local area, with several battles taking place near to the hall. It is also believed that Oliver Cromwell rested at the Hall overnight as a guest of the then owner John Molyneux who had declared for Parliament after the siege at Lathom House. The ghosts are of a young Roman Catholic girl who was hanged by a priest as evidence of his conversion to Protestantism. Cromwell's soldiers were not convinced and hung him on the same spot as the girl at Heskin Hall. Lady Lilford reported that on one occasion her guests departed due to their experience of the ghosts.

== See also ==
- Grade I listed buildings in Lancashire
- Listed buildings in Heskin
