= Countess of Powis =

Countess of Powis is the title given to the wife of the Earl of Powis and has been held by a number of women, including:

- Elizabeth Herbert, Marchioness of Powis (c.1634-1691)
- Barbara Herbert, Countess of Powis (1735–1786)
- Henrietta Clive, Countess of Powis (1755–1830)
- Lucy Herbert, Countess of Powis (1793–1875)
- Violet Herbert, Countess of Powis (1865–1929)
