= Stephen Powys, 6th Baron Lilford =

The Right Honourable The Lord Lilford

Member of the House of Lords
- Lord Temporal
- In office 17 December 1945 – 19 September 1949
- Preceded by: The 5th Baron Lilford
- Succeeded by: The 7th Baron Lilford

Personal details
- Born: Stephen Powys; 8 March 1869
- Died: 19 September 1949 (aged 80) Marylebone
- Known for: 6th Baron Lilford

Stephen Powys, 6th Baron Lilford (8 March 1869 – 19 September 1949), was a British peer.

Powys was the third son of Thomas Powys, 4th Baron Lilford, and his wife Emma Elizabeth Brandling. His birth was registered a month after he was born by his father and gave his parents as Thomas Littleton Lord Lilford and Emma Elizabeth Lilford. Regrettably there was no space on the form to enter his surname, which was, as his parents had been, Powys; so the index gave him his father's title name as his surname.

He never used the surname of Lilford, he may not even have known that was what was implicit in his birth certificate, though he did become Lord Lilford himself in later life. There is no evidence to show that he was adopted, the evidence is merely that of confusion in the mind of the registrars at the time of registration.

Following the death of his mother Emma in 1884, his father remarried Clementina Georgina Baillie-Hamilton in 1885 in Cookham, Berkshire. He was educated at Sunningdale School, Harrow School, Trinity College, Cambridge, and the University of Cambridge.

In 1945, he inherited the title of Baron Lilford from his full brother John Powys, 5th Baron Lilford, but died in 1949 at Marylebone, London. He has a portrait in the National Portrait Gallery.

His estates, which included the Lilford Hall estate in Northamptonshire, Bank Hall Estate in Lancashire, Bewsey Estate in Cheshire, and his fathers residence in Mayfair, and the barony passed to George Vernon Powys, his second cousin twice removed, as Lord Lilford never married or had children.

Coat of arms of Stephen Powys, 6th Baron Lilford
Crest A lion's jamb couped and erect Gules, holding a staff headed with a fleur-de-lis also erect Or. Escutcheon Or, a lion's jamb erased in bend dexter, between two cross crosslets fitchee in bend sinister Gules. Supporters Dexter, a reaper habited in a loose shirt, leather breeches loose at the knees, white stockings, and black hat and shoes; in his hat ears of corn, in his right band a reaping-hook, and at his feet a garb, all proper. Sinister, a man in the uniform of the' Northamptonshire yeomanry cavalry, riz. a green long coat, orna-mented on the cuffs and button-holes with gold lace, yellow waistcoat and breeches, and black top boots; a black stock; a round hat, adorned with a white feather in front and a green one behind, the sword-belt inscribed with the letters N.Y. and the exterior hand resting on his sword sheathed and point downwards. Motto Parta Tueri (To maintain acquired possessions).

Peerage of Great Britain
Preceded by John Powys	Baron Lilford; 1945–1949; Member of the House of Lords (1945–1949)	Succeeded by George Powys
