= Atherton Hall, Leigh =

Estate in Atherton, England

Coordinates: 53.509°N 2.500°W

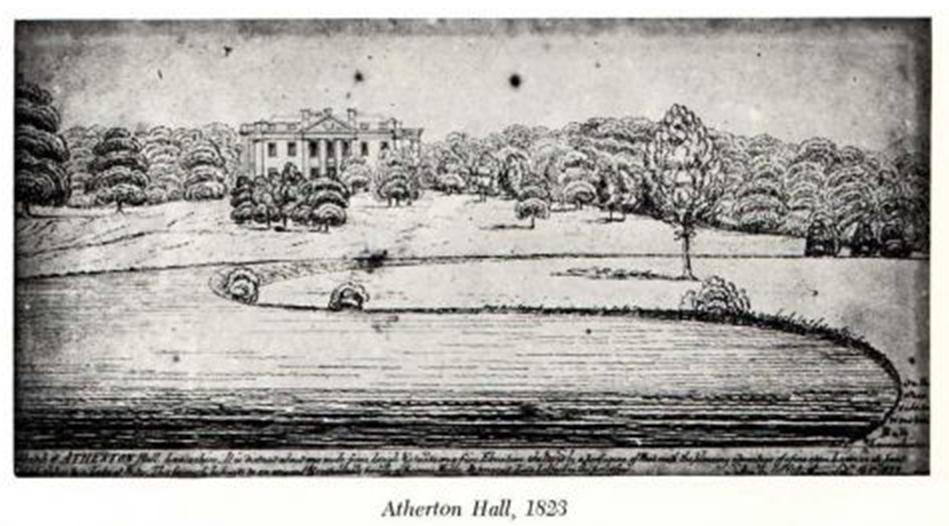
Atherton Hall in 1823

Atherton Hall was a country house and estate in Atherton historically a part of Lancashire, England. The hall was built between 1723 and 1742 and demolished in 1824. Christopher Saxton's map shows there was a medieval deer park here in the time of Elizabeth I.

== History ==
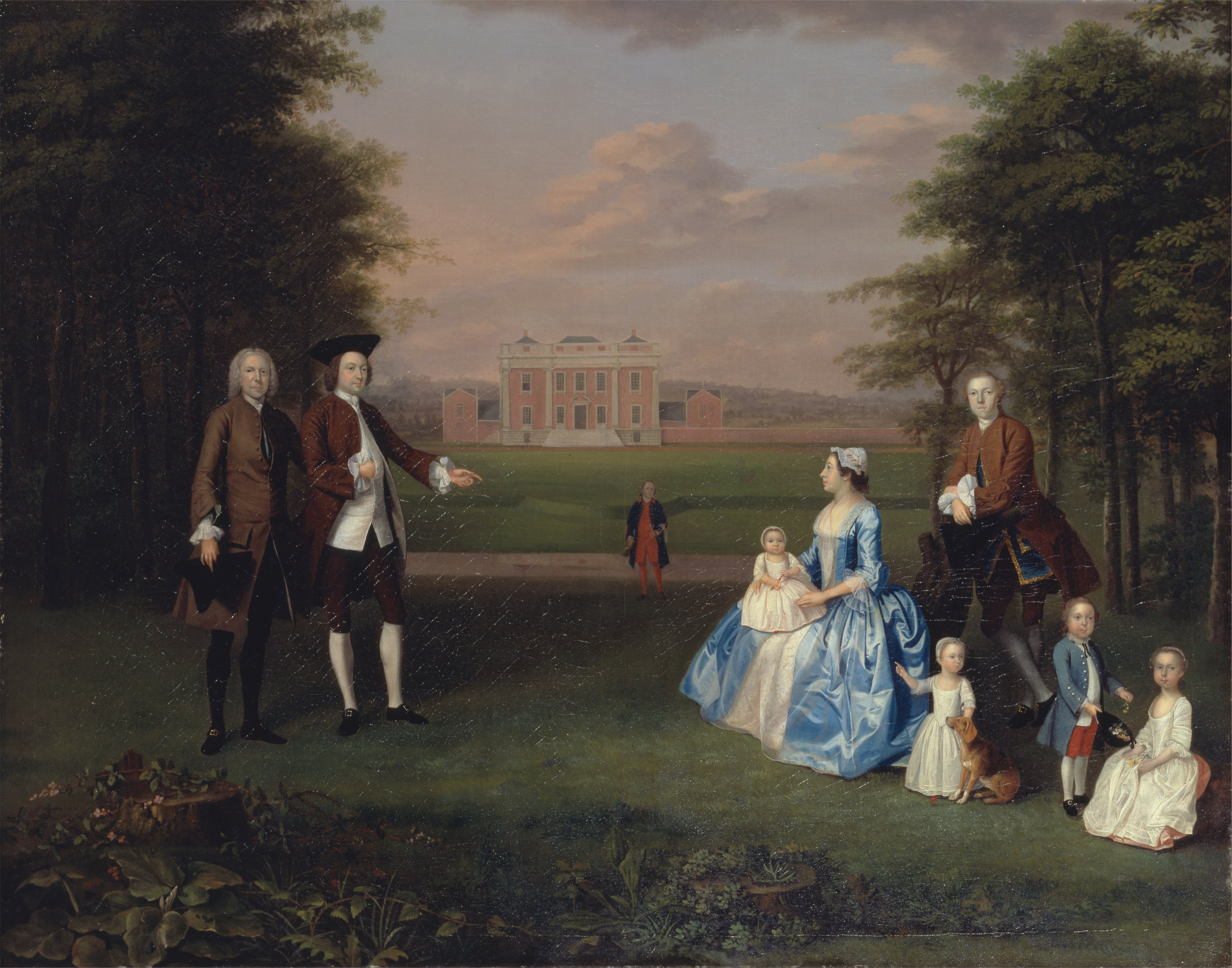
Robert and Elizabeth Gwillym and their family, of Atherton Hall, Lancashire (Arthur Devis, ca. 1746)

Atherton Hall replaced the moated Lodge Hall as the seat of the Athertons who had been lords of the manor of Atherton since the township emerged in the Middle Ages. In 1723, Richard Vernon Atherton, "Mad Richard", began building a new mansion to designs by William Wakefield at a cost of £63,000 (equivalent to £3,360,000 in 2023), The hall's construction was described by Lunn as, "A testimony to his pride, vanity and insanity". It was unfinished at the time of Richard Atherton's death in 1726 and completed by his son-in-law Robert Gwillym in 1743.

The hall's façade was 102 feet wide supported by Ionic fluted pillars and pilasters. Its Great Hall measured 36 feet by 45 feet. The hall is described in Vitruvius Britannicus vol.iii p. 89.

== Occupants ==
The Atherton family's long association with the township ended with Richard Atherton's death in 1726. His daughter Elizabeth Atherton married Robert Gwillym who completed the hall. Their son Robert Vernon Atherton Gwillym married Henrietta Maria Legh. They had five children; their sons died young, the second daughter Elizabeth married her cousin George Anthony Legh Keck of Bank Hall and a third daughter, Esther, married John Hornby, rector of Winwick. Their eldest daughter, Henrietta Maria Atherton, married Thomas Powys, 2nd Baron Lilford. His father was ennobled by Pitt the Younger in 1797, taking the title of Baron Lilford. Thomas Powys, 2nd Baron Lilford, left his estates to his son, Thomas Atherton Powys.

== Demolition ==
In the early 19th century the Atherton estate was inherited by Thomas Powys, Lord Lilford, who preferred to live at the family seat, Lilford Hall in Northamptonshire. The Lilfords had inherited another property in Bewsey which belonged to the Athertons, and considered one property in Lancashire adequate for their needs having lavished considerable expense on Bewsey Hall. After failing to sell Atherton Hall which was less than a century old, it was demolished in 1824. Some furniture and carpets went to Bewsey, the clock from the tower was given to Chowbent Chapel. Many fittings from the house such as fireplaces were sold at auction and installed in other houses in the area. An organ was advertised for sale and the parishioners at St John's Chapel in Atherton begged it as a gift but Lord Lilford gave it to his sister in law and it was installed at St Oswald's Church, Winwick where her husband was rector. However, some outbuildings were left standing and are private property still known as Atherton Hall, the estate is now known as Lilford Park.

== Lilford Park ==
In 1914 part of the landscaped Atherton estate and surrounding woodland was presented to the town of Leigh by Lord Lilford and is known as Lilford Park. In the Victorian era its crescent-shaped lake, about three-quarters of a mile (1.2 km) in length spanned by a three-arch stone bridge constructed in 1724, was popular with visitors. The bridge was known as Lions Bridge from the carved stone lions on pedestals at intervals on its length. The lake dried up in the 19th century and the bridge collapsed in 1905. Two stone lions were moved to Bank Hall until the 1970s when they were moved to the estate office in Tarleton.
