= Marchioness of Powis =

The title, Marchioness of Powis, belongs to the wife of the Marquess of Powis and has been held by the following:

- Elizabeth Herbert, Marchioness of Powis (c.1634–1691), wife of William Herbert, 1st Marquess of Powis
- Mary Herbert, Marchioness of Powis (died 1724), wife of William Herbert, 2nd Marquess of Powis
