= Anthony James Keck =

English Politician

Member of Parliament for Leicester
- In office 1765–1768
- Preceded by: James Wigley
- Succeeded by: Eyre Coote

Member of Parliament for Newton
- In office 1768–1780
- Preceded by: Randle Wilbraham
- Succeeded by: Thomas Peter Legh

Personal details
- Born: Stoughton, Leicestershire, England
- Died: 28 February 1782 Lancashire
- Party: Tory
- Spouse: Elizabeth Keck (née Legh)
- Children: Peter Robert Anthony Keck (buried 11 January 1768); Elizabeth Keck (buried on 5 February 1773); Anthony Peter Beaumont Keck (buried on 14 March 1777), Peers Anthony Keck (buried 12 March 1797), George Anthony Legh Keck (died 4 September 1860)
- Occupation: Politician

Anthony James Keck (c1740 – 1782) was an English politician who sat in the House of Commons from 1765 to 1780.

Keck was born in Stoughton, Leicestershire, and educated at Eton, St John's College, Cambridge, and Lincoln's Inn.

He was member of parliament (MP) for Leicester from 1765 to 1768, also for the rotten borough of Newton in Lancashire from 1768 to 1780. He lived at Stoughton Grange until he moved to Lancashire in 1768 and died aged 42 years, on 28 February 1782. He is buried at St Mary and All Saints Church in Stoughton. along with numerous members of his family and descendants including his son, George Anthony Legh Keck (who was also MP for Leicestershire).

== Family ==
He was descended from Thomas Keck (1617-1671) who was the elder brother of Sir Anthony Keck (1630-1695)(MP)Sir Anthony Keck. His father was Anthony James Keck of Lincoln's Inn, son of Rev David James and Martha Keck, and his mother was Anne Busby of Beaumont, daughter of William Busby and Catherine Beaumont his wife. His father was a sergeant-at-law, who worked with Thomas Vernon.His father changed his surname to Keck in 1736 which enabled the family to use the Keck coat of arms. Anthony James Keck, married Elizabeth Legh (the second daughter of Peter Legh of Lyme Park and Martha Bennet of Salthrop House), and by her had six children as follows:

| Child | Birth | Death |
|---|---|---|
| Peter Robert Anthony Keck | 1768 | Died an infant, buried on 11 January 1768 |
| Elizabeth Keck | 1773 | Died an infant, buried on 5 February 1773 |
| Anthony Peter Beaumont Keck, | 1777 | Died an infant, buried on 14 March 1777 |
| Piers Anthony Keck | 1769 | Died unmarried aged 28, buried on 12 March 1797 |
| George Anthony Legh Keck | 1774 | Died 4 September 1860 at Bank Hall, Lancashire but was brought back to the family church for burial |
| Elizabeth Ann Keck | 1781 | Unknown date of death, but known to have married Thomas Calley of Burderop in Chiseldon. |

There are marble plaques in remembrance for all the Keck family in the church of St Mary and All Saints in Stoughton. Elizabeth Legh remarried after the death of Anthony James Keck to William Bathurst Pye-Bennet and inherited the Broad Hinton estate (from the new marriage) and Salthrop estate (from her mother Martha Legh (née Bennet)) as well as the estates belonging to Norborne Family of Bremhill, Wiltshire. The estates then passed to her surviving daughter Elizabeth Calley (née Keck).

Parliament of Great Britain
| Preceded by George Wrighte; James Wigley | Member of Parliament for Leicester; 1765–1768; With: George Wrighte 1765-1766; John Darker 1766-1768 | Succeeded by Booth Grey; Eyre Coote |
| Preceded by Randle Wilbraham; Peter Legh | Member of Parliament for Newton; 1768–1780; With: Peter Legh; Robert Vernon Atherton Gwillym | Succeeded by Thomas Peter Legh; Thomas Davenport, KC |
