= Charles Morris (New Zealand cricketer) =

New Zealand cricketer

Personal information
- Full name: Charles Morris
- Born: 1840
- Died: Unknown
- Source: ESPNcricinfo, 18 May 2016

Charles Morris (born 1840, date of death unknown) was a New Zealand cricketer. He played one first-class match for Otago during the 1863–64 season.

An opening batsman who had come to New Zealand from Victoria, Morris scored only 1 and 2 in his only match, but he has the distinction of having faced the first delivery in New Zealand first-class cricket. He also scored the first run, and shortly afterwards became the first batsman to be dismissed. At the time he was the captain of the newly founded North Dunedin Cricket Club.

A few weeks later Morris won a bat for making Otago's equal top score (12) in the match against the touring English team. He was one of only four New Zealand batsmen who reached double figures in the three matches against the English team. He is known to have played club cricket in Dunedin, but no details of his life after 1865 are known.
