= George Powys, 7th Baron Lilford =

The Right Honourable The Lord Lilford

Member of the House of Lords
- Lord Temporal
- In office 19 September 1949 – 11 November 1999 as a hereditary peer
- Preceded by: The 6th Baron Lilford
- Succeeded by: Seat abolished (Note: Pursuant to the House of Lords Act 1999.)

Personal details
- Born: George Vernon Powys; 8 January 1931
- Died: 3 January 2005 (aged 73)
- Occupation: Businessman, peer

George Vernon Powys, 7th Baron Lilford (8 January 1931 – 3 January 2005), was the son of Robert Horace Powys and Vera Grace Bryant. Born in 1931, he inherited the title of Baron Lilford in 1949, following the death of Stephen Powys, 6th Baron Lilford, his second cousin twice removed, and held it until his own death on 3 January 2005 at Paarl, South Africa.

== Personal life ==
His father died in 1940, so at the age of eighteen years he inherited the Lilford barony from his second cousin twice removed, Stephen Powys. He was educated at Stonyhurst College and lived at Saint John, Jersey, Channel Islands, following the divorce from his fourth wife.

His first wife was Eve Bird whom he married in 1954.

He moved to South Africa and married Anuta Merritt on 29 June 1957, but were divorced by September 1958. He set up a business in South Africa by where he manufactured car tyres. He married third wife Norma Yyvonne Shell on 12 September 1958, but were divorced in 1961.

His fourth wife was Muriel Spottiswoode whom he married on 23 December 1961. They had two children, and divorced in 1969 by where Muriel won the Heskin Hall estate in the divorce agreement. The settlement transferred ownership of the Heskin Hall estate to his former wife.

His fifth wife was Margaret Penman whom he married in 1969 and had three children with, including Mark Vernon (born 1975). The couple divorced in 1991. Lord Lilford died in 2005 and was succeeded in the barony by his son Mark.

Coat of arms of George Powys, 7th Baron Lilford
Crest A lion's jamb couped and erect Gules, holding a staff headed with a fleur-de-lis also erect Or. Escutcheon Or, a lion's jamb erased in bend dexter, between two cross crosslets fitchee in bend sinister Gules. Supporters Dexter, a reaper habited in a loose shirt, leather breeches loose at the knees, white stockings, and black hat and shoes; in his hat ears of corn, in his right band a reaping-hook, and at his feet a garb, all proper. Sinister, a man in the uniform of the' Northamptonshire yeomanry cavalry, riz. a green long coat, orna-mented on the cuffs and button-holes with gold lace, yellow waistcoat and breeches, and black top boots; a black stock; a round hat, adorned with a white feather in front and a green one behind, the sword-belt inscribed with the letters N.Y. and the exterior hand resting on his sword sheathed and point downwards. Motto Parta Tueri (To maintain acquired possessions).

== Notes ==
Peerage of Great Britain
Preceded by Stephen Powys	Baron Lilford; 1949–2005; Member of the House of Lords (1949–1999)	Succeeded by Mark Powys
