= Richard Powys =

English cricketer

Personal information
- Born: 19 August 1844; Broseley, England
- Died: 10 June 1913 (aged 68); East Sheen, England
- Source: Cricinfo, 20 October 2020

Richard Powys (19 August 1844 – 10 June 1913) was an English cricketer. He played in two first-class matches in New Zealand for Canterbury from 1865 to 1867.

== See also ==
- List of Canterbury representative cricketers
