= Thomas Powys, 2nd Baron Lilford =

British peer (1775-1825)

The Lord Lilford DL
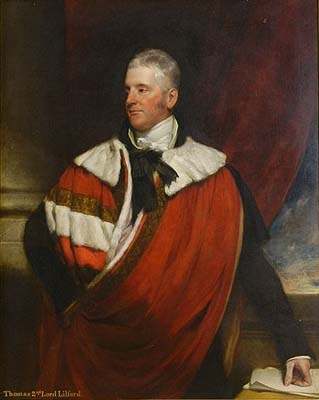
- Thomas Powys 2nd Baron Lilford (portrait by Henry William Pickersgill)
- Born: 8 April 1775; Lilford Hall, Northamptonshire, England
- Died: 4 July 1825 (aged 50); Grosvenor Place, London
- Other names: Thomas Powys, 2nd Baron Lilford
- Education: Eton College
- Alma mater: St John's College, Cambridge
- Occupation: Barrister
- Spouse: Henrietta Maria Vernon Atherton (m. 1797)
- Parents: Thomas Powys, 1st Baron Lilford (father); Mary Mann (mother)

Thomas Powys, 2nd Baron Lilford DL (8 April 1775 – 4 July 1825) was a British peer.

== Early life ==
He was the son of Thomas Powys, 1st Baron Lilford and Mary Mann of Lilford Hall.

He was educated at Eton College, St John's College, Cambridge and Lincoln's Inn (1794).

== Career ==
He succeeded his father as Baron Lilford in 1800.

He was appointed a Deputy Lieutenant of Northamptonshire on 9 May 1803.

== Personal life ==
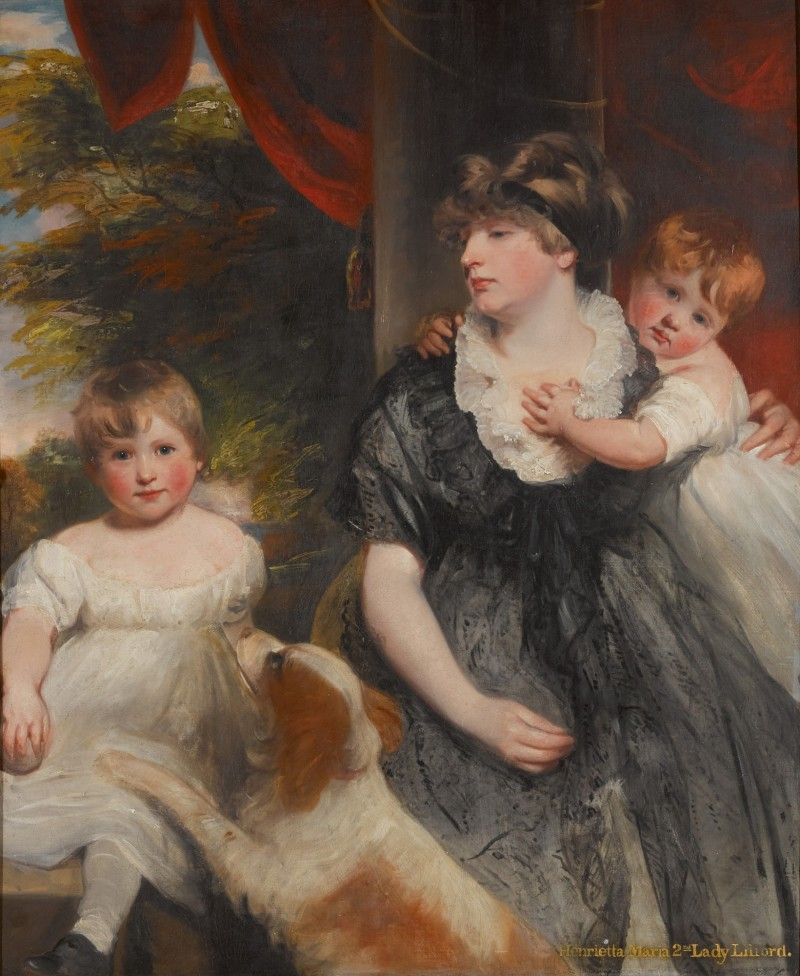
Henrietta Maria Vernon Atherton, 2nd Lady Lilford by John Hoppner, R.A.

On 5 December 1797 at Penwortham, Lancashire, he married Henrietta Maria Vernon Atherton of Atherton Hall, Leigh . Henrietta Maria Atherton (née Legh) inherited Bank Hall which had come to her mother from a first cousin, George Anthony Legh Keck and the Atherton Hall via her father Robert Vernon Atherton Gwillym. Together, they had twelve children:

- Thomas Atherton Powys, 3rd Baron Lilford (1801–1861), who married Hon. Mary Elizabeth Fox, daughter of Henry Fox, 3rd Baron Holland and Elizabeth Vassall, in 1830.
- Hon. Robert Vernon Powys (1802–1854), who married Jane Beckett, daughter of William Beckett, in 1825.
- Hon. Horatio Powys (1805–1877)
- Hon. Atherton Legh Powys (1809–1886)
- Hon. Henry Littleton Powys (1812–1863), who inherited Stoughton Grange, Leicestershire; he married Maria Gore, a daughter of Adm. Sir John Gore.
- Hon. Charles Powys (1813–1897)
- Hon. Henrietta Maria Powys (d. 1870)
- Hon. Eleanor Powys (1800–1880)
- Hon. Mary Powys (1804–1883)
- Hon. Elizabeth Atherton Powys (1807–1891)
- Hon. Frances Hester Powys (d. 1840)
- Hon. Jane Lucy Powys (1810–1905)

Lord Lilford died at Grosvenor Place on 4 July 1825 and was buried on 15 July 1835, at Achurch, Northamptonshire.

== Coat of arms ==
Coat of arms of Thomas Powys, 2nd Baron Lilford
Crest A lion's jamb couped and erect Gules, holding a staff headed with a fleur-de-lis also erect Or. Escutcheon Or, a lion's jamb erased in bend dexter, between two cross crosslets fitchee in bend sinister Gules. Supporters Dexter, a reaper habited in a loose shirt, leather breeches loose at the knees, white stockings, and black hat and shoes; in his hat ears of corn, in his right band a reaping-hook, and at his feet a garb, all proper. Sinister, a man in the uniform of the' Northamptonshire yeomanry cavalry, riz. a green long coat, orna-mented on the cuffs and button-holes with gold lace, yellow waistcoat and breeches, and black top boots; a black stock; a round hat, adorned with a white feather in front and a green one behind, the sword-belt inscribed with the letters N.Y. and the exterior hand resting on his sword sheathed and point downwards. Motto Parta Tueri (To maintain acquired possessions).

Peerage of Great Britain
Preceded by Thomas Powys	Baron Lilford; 1800–1825	Succeeded by Thomas Atherton Powys
