= Baron Lilford =

Barony in the Peerage of Great Britain

- Creation date: 10 October 1797
- Created by: George III
- Peerage: Great Britain
- First holder: Thomas Powys
- Present holder: Mark Vernon Powys
- Heir presumptive: Matthew Paul Powys
- Status: extant
- Former seat: Lilford Hall
- Motto: Parta Tueri (To maintain acquired possessions)

Baron Lilford, of Lilford in the County of Northampton, is a title in the Peerage of Great Britain. It was created in 1797 for Thomas Powys, who had previously represented Northamptonshire in the House of Commons. His grandson, the third Baron, served as a Lord-in-waiting (government whip) from 1837 to 1841 in the Whig administration of Lord Melbourne. He was succeeded by his son, the fourth Baron, an ornithologist.

On the death of his younger son, the sixth Baron (who succeeded his elder brother), in 1949, the line of the third Baron failed. The late Baron was succeeded by his second cousin twice removed, the seventh Baron. He was the great-great-grandson of Robert Vernon Powys, second son of the second Baron. As of 2010, the title is held by his only son Mark Powys, the eighth Baron, who succeeded in 2005. The family seat from 1711 until the 1990s was Lilford Hall in Northamptonshire.

The current Baron Lilford retains ownership of land in Jersey, South Africa and West Lancashire, including the Bank Hall Estate, which were inherited in 1860 by Thomas Atherton Powys, 3rd Baron Lilford, upon the death of his wife's cousin George Anthony Legh Keck.

== Baron Lilford (1797) ==
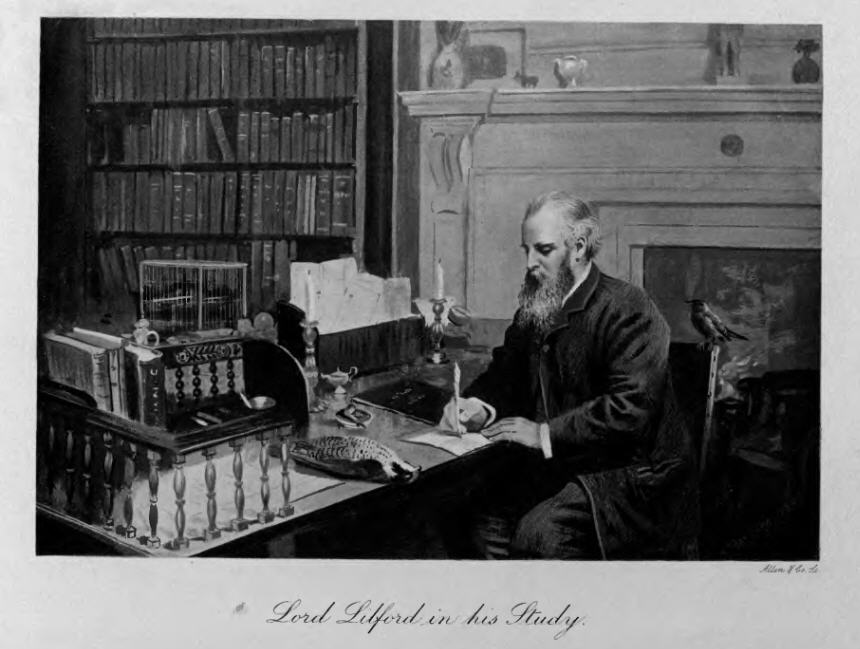
The 4th Baron Lilford in his study at Lilford Hall

- Thomas Powys, 1st Baron Lilford (1743–1800)
- Thomas Powys, 2nd Baron Lilford (1775–1825)
- Thomas Atherton Powys, 3rd Baron Lilford (1801–1861)
- Thomas Littleton Powys, 4th Baron Lilford (1833–1896)
- John Powys, 5th Baron Lilford (1863–1945)
- Stephen Powys, 6th Baron Lilford (1869–1949)
- George Vernon Powys, 7th Baron Lilford (1931–2005)
- Mark Vernon Powys, 8th Baron Lilford (born 1975)

The heir presumptive is the present holder's third cousin once removed, Matthew Paul Powys (born 1996).

=== Title succession chart ===
Title succession chart, Barons Lilford.

Thomas Powys; 1st Baron Lilford; 1743–1800
Thomas Powys; 2nd Baron Lilford; 1775–1825
Thomas Powys; 3rd Baron Lilford; 1801–1861	Hon. Robert Powys; 1802–1854
Thomas Powys; 4th Baron Lilford; 1833–1896	Hon. Leopold Fox-Powys; 1837–1893	Rev. Hon. Edward Powys; 1839–1930	Col. Hon. Charles Powys; 1840–1893	Robert Powys; 1826–1913
Hon. Thomas Powys; 1861–1882	John Powys; 5th Baron Lilford; 1863–1945	Stephen Powys; 6th Baron Lilford; 1869–1949	Mervyn Powys; 1866–1942	George Powys; 1868–1868	Edward Powys; 1870–1940	John Powys; 1857–1923	Robert Powys; 1860–1933	Charles Powys; 1862–1928	Henry Powys; 1866–1929	Wilfred Powys; 1873–1944
Hon. Thomas Powys; 1896–1909	Robert Powys; 1889–1940	Frank Powys; 1902–1972	Harold Powys; 1908–1919	Horace Powys; 1907–1956
George Powys; 7th Baron Lilford; 1931–2005	Robert Powys; 1930–2003	Michael Powys; 1934–2012
Mark Powys; 8th Baron Lilford born 1975	Matthew Powys; 1974–1976	Victor Powys; 1961–2021
Matthew Powys born 1996

== Arms ==
Coat of arms of Baron Lilford
Crest A lion's jamb couped and erect Gules, holding a staff headed with a fleur-de-lis also erect Or. Escutcheon Or, a lion's jamb erased in bend dexter, between two cross crosslets fitchee in bend sinister Gules. Supporters Dexter, a reaper habited in a loose shirt, leather breeches loose at the knees, white stockings, and black hat and shoes; in his hat ears of corn, in his right band a reaping-hook, and at his feet a garb, all proper. Sinister, a man in the uniform of the' Northamptonshire yeomanry cavalry, riz. a green long coat, orna-mented on the cuffs and button-holes with gold lace, yellow waistcoat and breeches, and black top boots; a black stock; a round hat, adorned with a white feather in front and a green one behind, the sword-belt inscribed with the letters N.Y. and the exterior hand resting on his sword sheathed and point downwards. Motto Parta Tueri (To maintain acquired possessions).
