= Thomas Powys, 1st Baron Lilford =

British politician

The Lord Lilford
- Other names: Thomas Powys, 1st Baron Lilford
- Known for: 1st Baron Lilford
- Born: 4 May 1743
- Died: 26 January 1800 (aged 56)

Thomas Powys, 1st Baron Lilford (4 May 1743 – 26 January 1800) was a British politician who sat in the House of Commons from 1774 to 1797 when he was raised to the peerage as Baron Lilford.

== Biography ==
Powys was the eldest son of Thomas Powys of Lilford Hall, Northamptonshire. He attended Eton College from 1755 to 1759 and in 1760 was admitted as fellow-commoner to King's College, Cambridge. He succeeded his father in 1767 and was appointed was High Sheriff of Northamptonshire for 1768–69.

Powys was elected to the House of Commons for Northamptonshire in 1774, a seat he held until 1797. The latter year he was raised to the peerage as Baron Lilford, of Lilford in the County of Northampton.

== Personal life ==
The family seat was Lilford Hall, first acquired by his great-grandfather, the judge, Thomas Powys. He was the son of Thomas Powys (24 Sep 1719 - 2 Apr 1767), only son heir of his gt-uncle Littleton Powys, and Henrietta Spencer ( - 1771). In 1770 he sold Henley Hall to Ralph Knight, who reconstructed the house.

Lord Lilford died in January 1800, aged 56, and was succeeded in the barony by his eldest son Thomas Powys.

Lord Lilford had married Mary, daughter of Galfridus Mann, in 1772 and had six sons and seven daughters. Lady Lilford died in 1823.

Child	Birth	Death
Eleanor Powys	1773	1854
Thomas Powys	1775	1825
Rev. Littleton Powys	1781	1842
Frederick Powys	1782	1850
Charles Powys	1784	1804
Caroline Powys	1787	1813
Horace Powys	1788	(died as infant) (1788)
Louisa Horatia Powys	1800	1871
Henry Powys	Unknown	1812
Lucy Powys	Unknown	1847
Emily Powys	Unknown	1844
Anne Powys and Sophia Powys (twins)	Unknown	Anne 1835 Sophia 1847

== Arms ==
Coat of arms of Thomas Powys, 1st Baron Lilford
Crest A lion's jamb couped and erect Gules, holding a staff headed with a fleur-de-lis also erect Or. Escutcheon Or, a lion's jamb erased in bend dexter, between two cross crosslets fitchee in bend sinister Gules. Supporters Dexter, a reaper habited in a loose shirt, leather breeches loose at the knees, white stockings, and black hat and shoes; in his hat ears of corn, in his right band a reaping-hook, and at his feet a garb, all proper. Sinister, a man in the uniform of the' Northamptonshire yeomanry cavalry, riz. a green long coat, orna-mented on the cuffs and button-holes with gold lace, yellow waistcoat and breeches, and black top boots; a black stock; a round hat, adorned with a white feather in front and a green one behind, the sword-belt inscribed with the letters N.Y. and the exterior hand resting on his sword sheathed and point downwards. Motto Parta Tueri (To maintain acquired possessions).

Parliament of Great Britain
Preceded by Sir John Dolben; Lucy Knightley	Member of Parliament for Northamptonshire; 1774–1797; With: Lucy Knightley 1774–1784; Sir James Langham 1784–1790; Francis Dickins 1790–1797	Succeeded by Francis Dickins; William Ralph Cartwright
Peerage of Great Britain
New creation	Baron Lilford; 1797–1800	Succeeded by Thomas Powys
