= Thomas Powys, 3rd Baron Lilford =

British Baron

The Right Honourable The Lord Lilford

Member of the House of Lords
- Lord Temporal
- In office 4 July 1825 – 15 March 1861
- Preceded by: The 2nd Baron Lilford
- Succeeded by: The 4th Baron Lilford

Personal details
- Born: Thomas Atherton Powys; 2 December 1801 Lilford Hall
- Died: 15 March 1861 (aged 59)
- Occupation: Politician

Thomas Atherton Powys, 3rd Baron Lilford (2 December 1801 – 15 March 1861), was a British peer and Whig politician.

Lilford was the son of Thomas Powys, 2nd Baron Lilford, and Henrietta Maria Atherton of Atherton Hall. He succeeded his father as Baron Lilford in 1825. From 1826 to 1827 he went on a Grand Tour accompanied by Thomas Henry Lister.They visited Weimar and Jena in June 1826, followed by Leipzig and Dresden. In November they visited Italy, that included a stay in Rome of over three months. Lister returned to England in June 1827 while Lord Lilford remained on at Naples. In 1837 he was appointed a Lord-in-waiting (government whip in the House of Lords) in the Whig administration of Lord Melbourne, a post he held until the government fell in August 1841. He never returned to office.

Lord Lilford married Mary Elizabeth Fox, daughter of Henry Vassall-Fox, 3rd Baron Holland, and Lady Holland, in 1830, and had ten children. He inherited Lilford Hall in Northamptonshire from his father in 1825. In 1860, he inherited Bank Hall in Bretherton, Lancashire, on the death of his uncle George Anthony Legh Keck. A year after inheriting he died in March 1861, aged 59, and was succeeded by his eldest son Thomas, a prominent ornithologist. Lady Lilford died in 1891.

Coat of arms of Thomas Powys, 3rd Baron Lilford
Crest A lion's jamb couped and erect Gules, holding a staff headed with a fleur-de-lis also erect Or. Escutcheon Or, a lion's jamb erased in bend dexter, between two cross crosslets fitchee in bend sinister Gules. Supporters Dexter, a reaper habited in a loose shirt, leather breeches loose at the knees, white stockings, and black hat and shoes; in his hat ears of corn, in his right band a reaping-hook, and at his feet a garb, all proper. Sinister, a man in the uniform of the' Northamptonshire yeomanry cavalry, riz. a green long coat, orna-mented on the cuffs and button-holes with gold lace, yellow waistcoat and breeches, and black top boots; a black stock; a round hat, adorned with a white feather in front and a green one behind, the sword-belt inscribed with the letters N.Y. and the exterior hand resting on his sword sheathed and point downwards. Motto Parta Tueri (To maintain acquired possessions).

Peerage of Great Britain
Preceded by Thomas Lilford	Baron Lilford; 1825–1861; Member of the House of Lords (1825–1861)	Succeeded by Thomas Powys
