= John Powys, 5th Baron Lilford =

British peer and cricketer

The Right Honourable The Lord Lilford

Member of the House of Lords
- Lord Temporal
- In office 17 June 1896 – 17 December 1945
- Preceded by: The 4th Baron Lilford
- Succeeded by: The 6th Baron Lilford

Personal details
- Born: John Powys; 12 January 1863 Lilford Hall
- Died: 17 December 1945 (aged 82) Kettering

John Powys, 5th Baron Lilford (12 January 1863 – 17 December 1945), was a British peer and cricketer.

== Biography ==
Powys was born at Lilford Hall, Northamptonshire, the son of ornithologist Thomas Powys, 4th Baron Lilford, and his wife Emma Elizabeth Powys (née Brandling).

He inherited the Lilford barony in 1896 upon the death of his father, along with the Lilford Hall, Bank Hall and Bewsey estates.

Powys was educated at Harrow School, and graduated from Brasenose College, Oxford, in 1886.

He was an officer in the 3rd (2nd Derbyshire Militia) Battalion, Sherwood Foresters, until he resigned with the honorary rank of Major on 4 June 1902. On 29 July 1922, he was appointed a deputy lieutenant of Northamptonshire.

Powys played cricket for Northamptonshire in 1911, making a single first-class appearance against the touring India national cricket team at the County Ground, Northampton.

== Family ==
He married Milly Isabella Louisa Soltau-Symons, a daughter of George William Culme Soltau Symons of Chaddlewood, the marriage took place on 9 August 1894 at Plympton St Mary, Devon. The Lilfords used the Bank Hall estate as a holiday home until 1898. Lady Lilford died on 8 April 1940 at Oundle. He died in Kettering on 17 December 1945 and was buried on 21 December 1945 at St Peters Church, Lilford, Northamptonshire. Their only child, Thomas Atherton Powys (8 May 1896 – 3 August 1909), died aged 13 during an operation for adenoids.

The estates and Lilford barony passed to Stephen Powys, who was the godson of Thomas Powys, 4th Baron Lilford, and adoptive brother of Lord Lilford.

Coat of arms of John Powys, 5th Baron Lilford
Crest A lion's jamb couped and erect Gules, holding a staff headed with a fleur-de-lis also erect Or. Escutcheon Or, a lion's jamb erased in bend dexter, between two cross crosslets fitchee in bend sinister Gules. Supporters Dexter, a reaper habited in a loose shirt, leather breeches loose at the knees, white stockings, and black hat and shoes; in his hat ears of corn, in his right band a reaping-hook, and at his feet a garb, all proper. Sinister, a man in the uniform of the' Northamptonshire yeomanry cavalry, riz. a green long coat, orna-mented on the cuffs and button-holes with gold lace, yellow waistcoat and breeches, and black top boots; a black stock; a round hat, adorned with a white feather in front and a green one behind, the sword-belt inscribed with the letters N.Y. and the exterior hand resting on his sword sheathed and point downwards. Motto Parta Tueri (To maintain acquired possessions).

Peerage of Great Britain
Preceded by Thomas Powys	Baron Lilford; 1896–1945; Member of the House of Lords (1896–1945)	Succeeded by Stephen Powys
