= Thomas Powys, 4th Baron Lilford =

British aristocrat and ornithologist

The Right Honourable The Lord Lilford
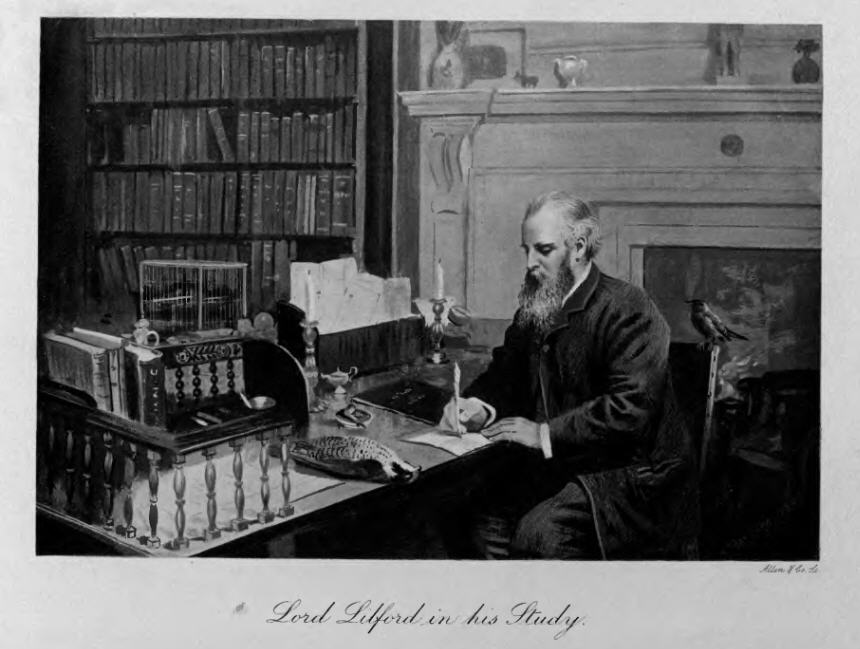
- Lord Lilford in his study at Lilford Hall

Member of the House of Lords
- Lord Temporal
- In office 15 March 1861 – 17 June 1896
- Preceded by: The 3rd Baron Lilford
- Succeeded by: The 5th Baron Lilford

Personal details
- Born: Thomas Littleton Powys; 18 March 1833 Stanhope Street, Mayfair, London
- Died: 17 June 1896 (aged 63) Lilford Hall
- Occupation: Aristocrat and ornithologist

Thomas Littleton Powys, 4th Baron Lilford (18 March 1833 – 17 June 1896), was a British aristocrat and ornithologist.

== Life ==
Lilford was the eldest son of Thomas Powys, 3rd Baron Lilford, and Mary Elizabeth Fox, daughter of Henry Vassall-Fox, 3rd Baron Holland. He was born in Stanhope Street, Mayfair, London, on 18 March 1833.

He succeeded his father in the Lilford barony in 1861. Lilford was one of the eight founders of the British Ornithologists' Union in 1858 and its president from 1867 until his death. He was also the first President of the Northamptonshire Natural History Society.

Lilford travelled widely, especially around the Mediterranean and his extensive collection of birds was maintained in the grounds of Lilford Hall, his second residence was Bank Hall in Bretherton, Lancashire, which he inherited from his father (3rd Baron Lilford), who inherited it from George Anthony Legh Keck. He inherited the Holland Estates from his mother's family.

Until 1891, his aviaries featured birds from around the globe, including rheas, kiwis, pink-headed ducks and a pair of free-flying bearded vultures. He was responsible for the introduction of the little owl into England in the 1880s.

He wrote about birds including Notes on the Birds of Northamptonshire and Neighbourhood (1895) and Coloured Figures of the Birds of the British Islands, which was completed by Osbert Salvin after his death.

A species of European lizard, Podarcis lilfordi, is named in his honour.

== Family ==
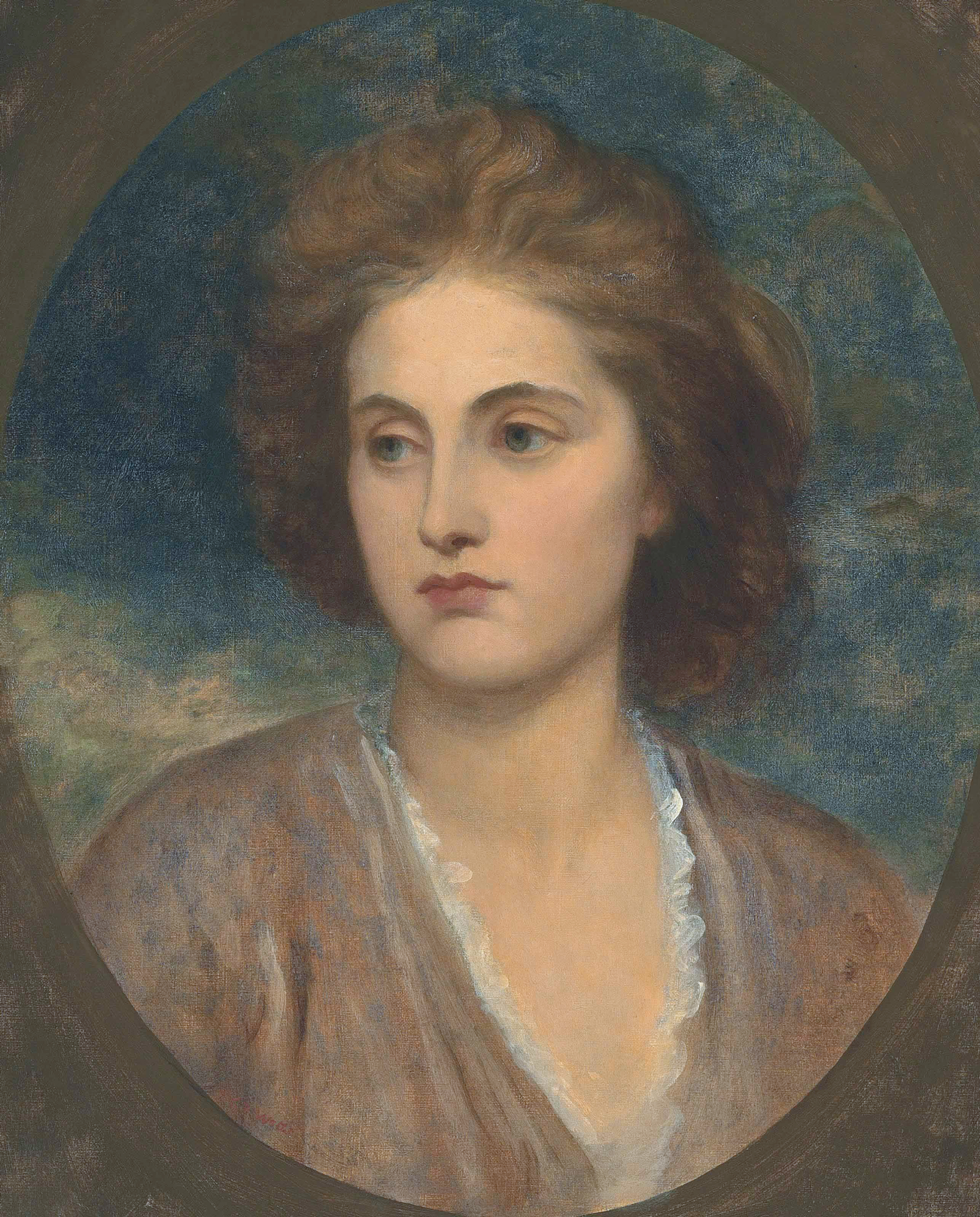
Emma Elizabeth Brandling, later Lady Lilford (George Frederic Watts)

Lord Lilford married, firstly, Emma Elizabeth Brandling, daughter of Robert William Brandling, in 1859. After her death in 1884 he married, secondly, Clementina Georgina, daughter of Ker Baillie-Hamilton, in 1885.

He died in June 1896, aged 63, and was succeeded in the barony by his eldest son from his first marriage, John. Lady Lilford died in 1929. A metal plaque commemorating a "Cedar of Atlantica" planted by Lady Lilford in 1897, was found in 2005 and is displayed in the visitor centre at Bank Hall.

== Bibliography ==
- Powys, Baron Lilford, Thomas Littleton; Salvin, Osbert; Newton, Alfred; Keulemans, John Gerrard (1885). Coloured figures of the birds of the British Islands. London: R.H. Porter. OCLC 1029665771. (in 7 volumes, 1885–1897)

Coat of arms of Thomas Powys, 4th Baron Lilford
Crest A lion's jamb couped and erect Gules, holding a staff headed with a fleur-de-lis also erect Or Escutcheon Or, a lion's jamb erased in bend dexter, between two cross crosslets fitchee in bend sinister Gules Supporters Dexter, a reaper habited in a loose shirt, leather breeches loose at the knees, white stockings, and black hat and shoes; in his hat ears of corn, in his right band a reaping-hook, and at his feet a garb, all proper. Sinister, a man in the uniform of the' Northamptonshire yeomanry cavalry, riz. a green long coat, orna-mented on the cuffs and button-holes with gold lace, yellow waistcoat and breeches, and black top boots; a black stock; a round hat, adorned with a white feather in front and a green one behind, the sword-belt inscribed with the letters N.Y. and the exterior hand resting on his sword sheathed and point downwards Motto Parta Tueri (To maintain acquired possessions)

== Sources ==
- Kidd, Charles, Williamson, David (editors). Debrett's Peerage and Baronetage (1990 edition). New York: St Martin's Press, 1990.
- Leigh Rayment's Peerage Pages

Peerage of Great Britain
Preceded by Thomas Powys	Baron Lilford; 1861–1896; Member of the House of Lords (1861–1896)	Succeeded by John Powys
