= Wrightington Bar =

Village in Lancashire, England

Coordinates: 53.615°N 2.703°W

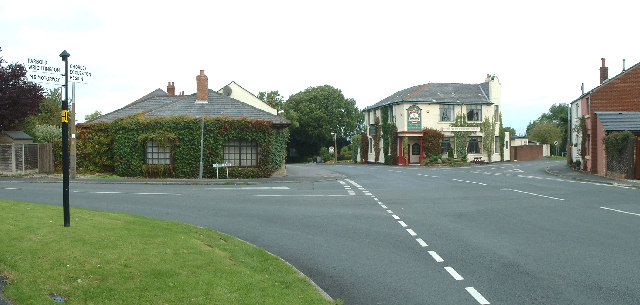
- Wrightington Bar

- Location in West Lancashire Location within Lancashire
- OS grid reference: SD534134
- Civil parish: Wrightington
- District: West Lancashire
- Shire county: Lancashire
- Region: North West
- Country: England
- Sovereign state: United Kingdom
- Post town: WIGAN
- Postcode district: WN6
- Dialling code: 01257
- Police: Lancashire
- Fire: Lancashire
- Ambulance: North West
- UK Parliament: West Lancashire

Wrightington Bar is a small linear village in West Lancashire, England. It is on the B5250 Appley Bridge to Eccleston road, and is in the civil parish of Wrightington.

== See also ==
- Listed buildings in Wrightington
