= Hilldale, Lancashire =

Civil parish in Lancashire, England

Coordinates: 53.603°N 2.765°W

Hilldale
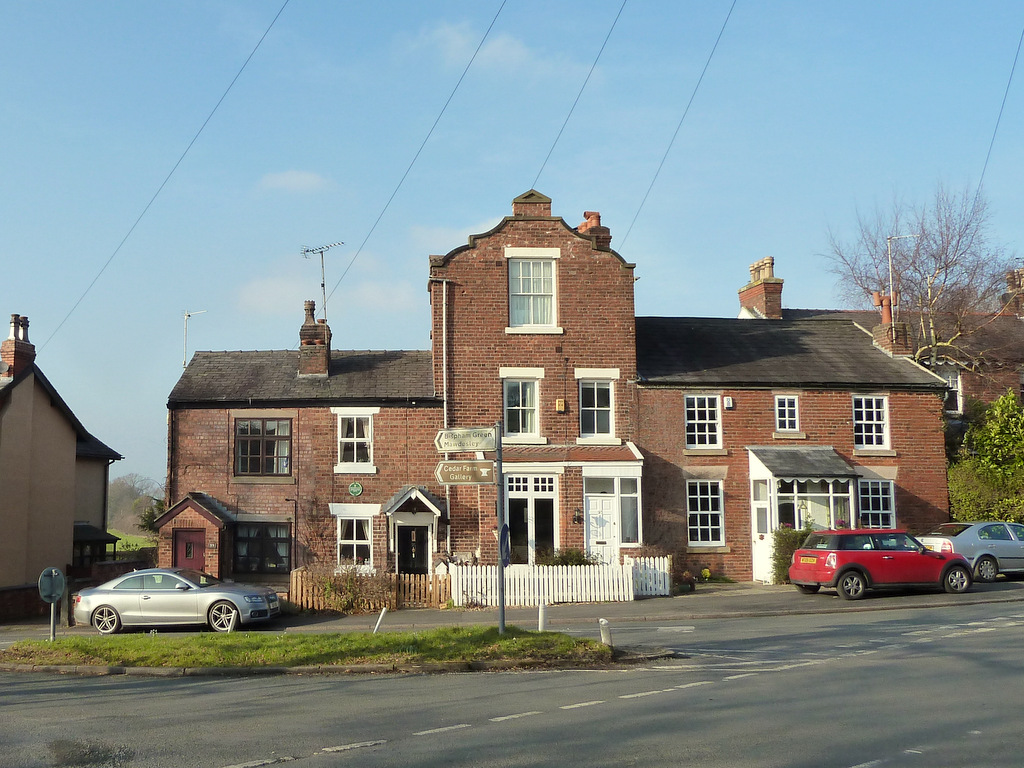
- Houses at the junction of Chorley Road and Maltkiln Lane

- Location in West Lancashire Location within Lancashire
- Area: 3.63 km^{2} (1.40 sq mi)
- Population: 581 (2011 Census)
  - Density: 160/km^{2} (410/sq mi)
- OS grid reference: SD494121
- District: West Lancashire
- Shire county: Lancashire
- Region: North West
- Country: England
- Sovereign state: United Kingdom
- Post town: Skelmersdale, Wigan
- Postcode district: WN8
- Post town: Ormskirk
- Postcode district: L40
- Post town: Chorley
- Postcode district: PR7
- Dialling code: 01257
- Police: Lancashire
- Fire: Lancashire
- Ambulance: North West
- UK Parliament: West Lancashire

Hilldale is a civil parish in the West Lancashire district of Lancashire, England, containing the village of Hill Dale and the neighbouring hamlet of Andertons Mill. Formerly part of Wrightington, Hilldale became a separate civil parish in 1999. As of 2011, Hilldale has a population of 581.

== History ==
In the 19th century, Hilldale had a small population and the settlement consisted of scattered farms and worker's cottages. The opening of the local quarry in the 1880s brought new opportunities to the area and it served as one of the main sources of employment until its closure in the 1970s. Hilldale established its own parish council on 1 April 1999, having previously been a ward of Wrightington civil parish.

== Geography ==
Hilldale is located in rural West Lancashire and is bordered by Bispham and Lathom to the west, Parbold to the south and Wrightington to the east; to the north are Mawdesley and Heskin in the borough of Chorley. The boundary with Lathom is formed by the River Douglas. The civil parish includes the hamlet of Andertons Mill, situated northeast of Hill Dale village.

Hilldale is about 11 miles (18 km) southwest of Preston, the administrative centre of Lancashire, and 183 miles (295 km) northwest of London.

== Demography ==
According to the United Kingdom Census 2011, Hilldale parish had a population of 581 people living in 248 households, with an approximate 47:53 ratio of males to females. The parish covers an area of 363 hectares (3.63 km^{2}; 1.40 sq mi), giving a population density of 1.60 inhabitants per hectare (160/km^{2}; 410/sq mi). The decrease in population from 633 recorded in 2001 represents a decline of 8.2% over ten years.

A majority of 97.9% residents were born in the United Kingdom, and 97.6% identified as being of "White British" ethnicity. Religion was recorded as 80.4% Christian, with 12.4% of residents being of no religion, and 6.5% declining to state; only 0.7% belonged to an alternative religion. Of the 437 residents aged between 16 and 74, a total of 289 were regarded as economically active, with five being unemployed.

== Landmarks ==
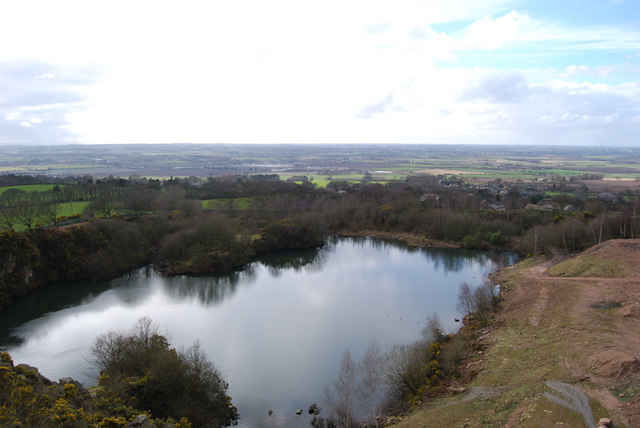
Flooded part of Hunters Hill Quarry

Hilldale has several listed buildings that are recorded on the National Heritage List for England, including Fairhurst Hall, an 18th-century brick house incorporating some older 16th century remains, a medieval stone cross base, and other farmhouses and farm buildings. In addition, West Lancashire Borough Council publishes its own "list of locally important buildings", which features a large brick villa on Robin Lane divided into two dwellings.

There are two designated conservation areas that lie partially within Hilldale: the Lancaster Lane conservation area is largely in Parbold but extends into the southern part of Hilldale and includes the aforementioned Fairhurst Hall, while the Maltkiln Lane/Chorley Road conservation area straddles the boundary with Bispham.

Hunters Hill, a former quarry to the east of Hill Dale village, has been converted into a countryside park and is maintained by the Borough Council.

== Transport ==
There are no main roads in Hilldale; the B5246 road passes through the southern part of the parish, running southeast from Mere Brow to Parbold, where it terminates at its junction with the A5209 about 0.7 miles (1.1 km) to the south. The nearest motorway link is junction 27 of the M6, about 2.2 miles (3.5 km) to the southeast at Wrightington. Parbold railway station is located about 0.6 miles (0.97 km) to the south and provides services to Manchester (via Wigan) and Southport.

== Religious sites ==
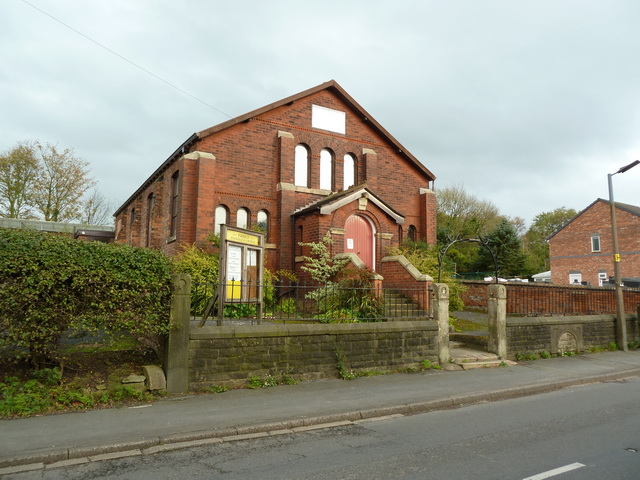
Parbold Evangelical Church

The only place of worship within Hilldale is Parbold Evangelical Church on Chorley Road, which holds a morning and evening service every Sunday. The area of Hilldale is served by the Anglican parish churches of Christ Church in Parbold, and St James the Great Church in Wrightington.
