= Hesketh Arms =

Listed former pub in Shevington, Greater Manchester, England

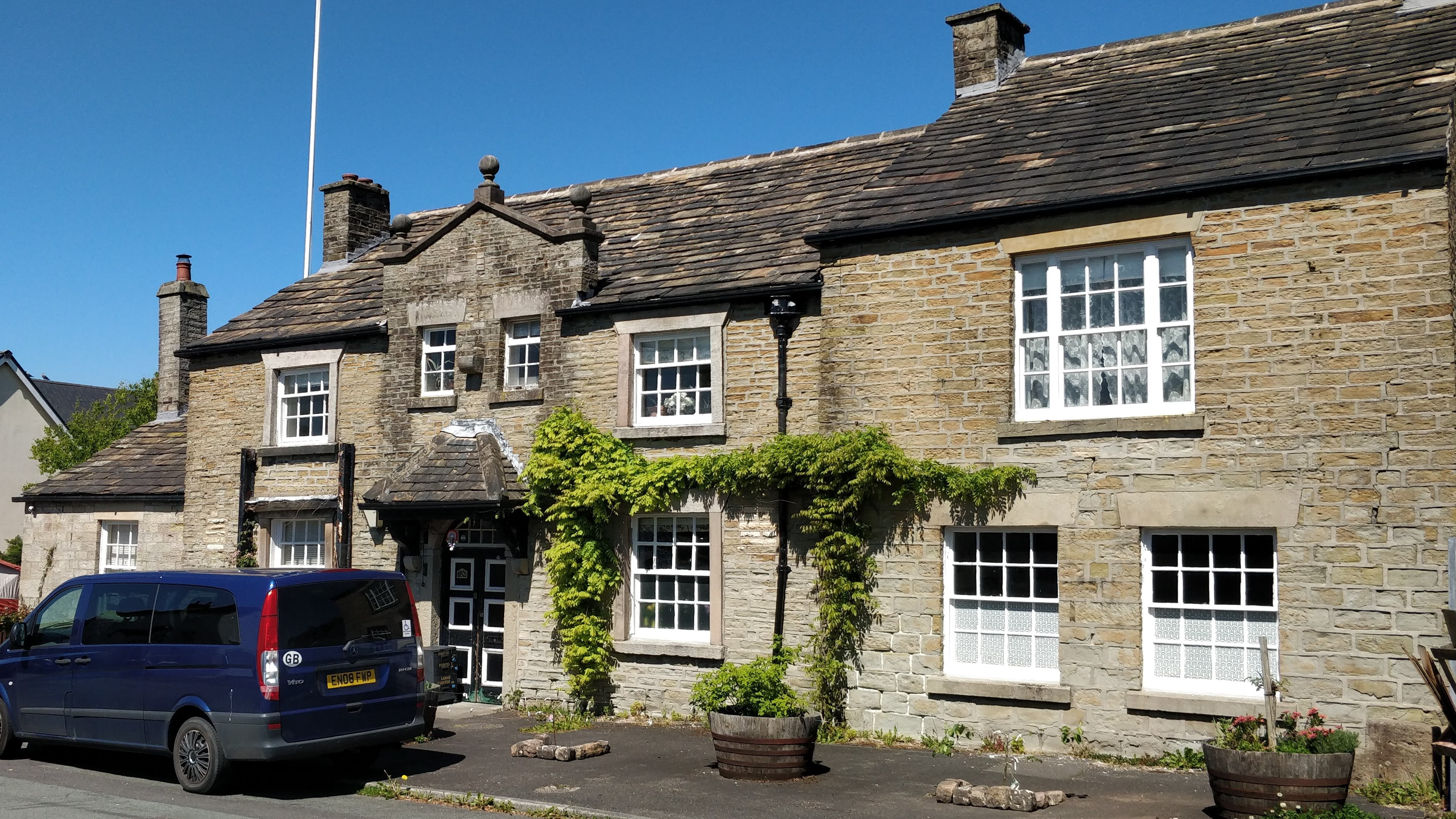
- The former pub in 2020

- Location within Greater Manchester
- Former names: Hesketh Arms Inn

General information
- Status: Converted to residential
- Type: Public house (former)
- Location: 109 Shevington Moor, Shevington, Greater Manchester, England
- Coordinates: 53.5903°N 2.6922°W
- Year built: 18th century
- Renovated: Late 19th and early 20th century (extended)
- Closed: Late 2000s

Design and construction
- Designations

Listed Building – Grade II
- Official name: Hesketh Arms public house and adjacent mounting block
- Designated: 27 January 2010
- Reference no.: 1393531

The Hesketh Arms is a Grade II listed former public house on Shevington Moor in Shevington, a village within the Metropolitan Borough of Wigan, Greater Manchester, England. Built in the 18th century and enlarged in the 19th and early 20th centuries, it traded as an inn and later a pub before closing in the late 2000s. It was listed in 2010 following a successful local campaign, and has since been converted into a five‑bedroom house. In 2026 plans were submitted to change its use to a nursery.

== History ==
The building was constructed in the 18th century, according to its official listing. It was later expanded with an early-19th-century assembly room and further extensions in the later 19th and early 20th centuries. The 1908 Ordnance Survey map marks the building as the Hesketh Arms Inn, while the 1928 edition records it as the Hesketh Arms public house.

On 27 January 2010, the Hesketh Arms was designated a Grade II listed building, following a successful local campaign, having closed as a pub in the late 2000s. The land to the rear was later developed for housing, and the former pub itself was converted into a five‑bedroom house. In early 2026, an application was submitted to Wigan Council to convert the building into a nursery. The proposal included removing several rear and front structures, adding a new rear porch and a first‑floor terrace with obscure glazing and a metal staircase, clearing hardstanding, and providing nine parking spaces. As of October 2026, no further update has been published.

== Architecture ==
The building is thought to have been constructed from locally quarried stone from Appley Bridge, with dressed stone details and stone‑slate roofs, and later slate roofing to the rear. The original part was arranged two rooms deep with a central entrance and a small cellar. An early 19th‑century extension on the east side added an assembly room with large rooms on both floors, heated by a chimney on the outer wall. Further additions were later made to the west and rear.

The main 18th‑century range has two storeys and three bays, built from small, shaped stone blocks. It has a double‑pitched roof with stone slates at the front and slates at the rear, and chimney stacks on both gable ends. The central entrance has a wide arched opening with large stone blocks and a prominent keystone, leading to double doors with a semi-circular glazed panel above. Windows on either side have stone surrounds and traditional sash frames. Smaller first‑floor windows sit above them, also with stone details.

A hipped porch canopy from the early 20th century shelters the doorway, supported by shaped timber brackets on stone corbels. Above it are two small windows with simple stone sills and deep lintels, and between them a stone corbel that once held a pub sign. A small gablet with decorative stonework and finials rises above the eaves.

A two‑step stone mounting block stands beside the south‑east corner of the assembly‑room extension, and it forms part of the listed building.

== See also ==
- Listed buildings in Shevington
- Listed pubs in Greater Manchester
