= Shevington =

Village and civil parish in Greater Manchester, England

Coordinates: 53.572°N 2.690°W

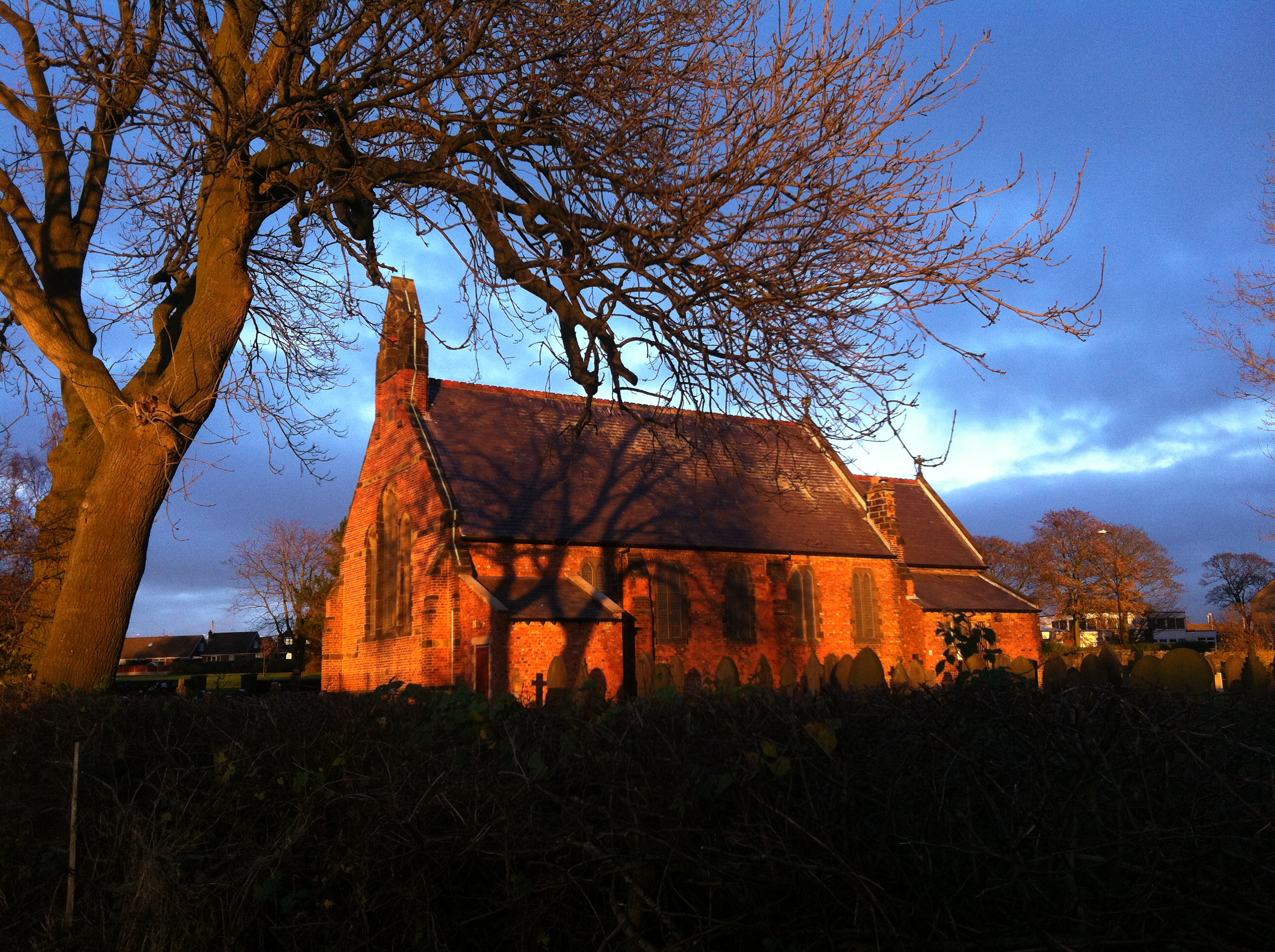
- St Anne's Church in Shevington

- Location within Greater Manchester
- Population: 10,000
- OS grid reference: SD542086
- Civil parish: Shevington
- Metropolitan borough: Wigan
- Metropolitan county: Greater Manchester
- Region: North West
- Country: England
- Sovereign state: United Kingdom
- Post town: WIGAN
- Postcode district: WN6
- Dialling code: 01257
- Police: Greater Manchester
- Fire: Greater Manchester
- Ambulance: North West
- UK Parliament: Wigan

Shevington is a village and civil parish within the Metropolitan Borough of Wigan, Greater Manchester, England. The population of the Wigan ward called Shevington and Lower Ground had increased to 11,482 at the 2011 Census.

Lying within the historic county boundaries of Lancashire, Shevington lies approximately 3 miles (4.8 km) from Wigan town centre and at the 2001 census had a population of 9,786.

== History ==
=== Toponymy ===
Shevington, a farmstead near a hill called shevin, derives from the Celtic cevn meaning a ridge and the Old English tun, a farmstead. It is a hill slope settlement in the Douglas Valley recorded in documents in 1225 as Shefington. Other recorded spellings include Scheuynton in 1253, Sheuington in 1277, Sewinton 1288 and Sheuynton in 1292.

=== History ===
Shevington became a manor, an estate system of local government held of the king by a lord of the manor from the 12th to the 18th centuries. Although the manorial system no longer functions as local government, a lordship of the manor may survive separately as an incorporeal hereditament. The area was included within the ecclesiastical parish of Standish until 1887 when it was granted separate status with the consecration of St Anne's Church.

From earliest times the area had a sparse and scattered population eking out a living from the common and wood and farmlands owned by the church including Burscough Priory, Cockersand Abbey and the Knights Hospitallers until the Dissolution of the Monasteries from 1536, and that of the local gentry included Sir Adam Banastre, Lord of the Manor in 1288 and the Standish, Catterall, Stanley, Rigby, Hulton, Dicconson and Hesketh families, the last Hesketh lord of the manor was in 1798. In 2022 the Lordship of Shevington was conveyed to Darren Poole.

In Tudor times only a handful of families existed, possibly as few as 30, the population reached 335 by 1764, and the first official census in 1801 recorded 646. The 1851 census 1,147, 1,753 in 1,901, reaching 3,057 by 1951 and 8,001 in 1971.

By the 18th century most of the common land had been enclosed forming landed estates and tenant farms where mixed farming was practised. Corn was ground into flour at local water mills – Finch Mill on the Calico Brook and Standish Mill on Mill Brook and skills associated with agriculture developed – smithies, wheelwrights and so on. Handloom weaving and basket making were also undertaken together with primitive coal mining in the Elnup Woods area.

Demand for coal mining during the Industrial Revolution led to an intensification of mining with coal from many local pits transported via the River Douglas at Gathurst when the river was made navigable in 1742 but replaced from the 1780s by the Leeds and Liverpool Canal when much of the coal was loaded on to barges at Crooke. Past industries have included a glue factory and brick and tile works in Appley Bridge and the ICI Roburite Nobel Division Explosives Works (now Orica) at Gathurst from 1941-42 which employed over 500 workers during the Second World War, but was first established south of the River Douglas in 1888. The ICI Nobels Roburite Works was connected to Gathurst railway station by a 2 ft (610 mm) narrow gauge railway.

Shevington's scattered communities became more cohesive with the development of the village school from 1814, residential development from the 1850s the original Plough & Harrow public house, post office and shops near or in the long-recognised centre of the village at Broad o' th' Lane.

== Governance ==
Anciently Shevington lay in the hundred of Leyland in Lancashire. It was a township in the parish of Standish and in 1837 became part of the Poor Law Union of Wigan. In 1894 under the Local Government Act the village achieved the status of a parish council, which included Shevington Vale, part of Appley Bridge, Shevington Moor and Crooke within its ancient boundaries, defined by the Calico Brook, Almond Brook, Mill Brook and the River Douglas. Since local government reforms which took place in 1974, Shevington has formed part of the Metropolitan Borough of Wigan of Greater Manchester, having previously been part of the administrative county of Lancashire.

Following the local elections in May 2012, Shevington now has three Labour District Councillors. This is the first time since 2006 that Labour has held all three seats.

The village currently has a parish council, which receives a precept from the Council Tax.

== Geography ==
Shevington is built on sloping land between Standish and Wigan to the north-east of the River Douglas. Its area is 1,708 acres (6.91 km^{2}). The underlying rocks are coal measures. The Leeds and Liverpool Canal runs parallel to the River Douglas. Shevington is located close to Junction 27 of the M6 motorway and is bordered by the villages of Appley Bridge and Standish, but also has close links to the villages of Wrightington and Standish Lower Ground.

Today there is little evidence of past industrial activity, though there has been a marked increase in residential development between the 1950s and 1980s, attracted by Shevington's pleasant rural setting, still surrounded by much open land and ancient woods. Further residential development, on the former Orica site to the south of the village, was completed in the early 2010s and is called Oakwood Meadows. The 2001 census recorded a population of 11,725 in the Shevington with Lower Ground ward.

== Education ==
Shevington High School is a secondary school. There are three primary schools in and around the village; Millbrook Primary School, St. Bernadette's Roman Catholic Primary School and Shevington Vale Primary School. Unusually, the primary school associated with St. Anne's Church in Shevington is in the neighbouring village of Standish Lower Ground. The village of Appley Bridge is also a neighbour of Shevington.

St.John Rigby College is located in the neighbouring village of Orrell. With an 'Outstanding' Ofsted rating, it is one of the best performing colleges in the country. Ofsted report, St. John Rigby College

== Transport ==
Shevington has good communications via the M6 motorway (junction 27) which progressed through the parish in 1963 and the Manchester to Southport Line railway, with stations at Gathurst and Appley Bridge which first opened in the 1850s. From these stations there are direct rail links to both Southport and Manchester, as well as connections at Wigan to the West Coast Main Line. There is also a connection to the M58 motorway via nearby junction 26 of the M6.

The 113,635 and 362 serve the village of Shevington as well as 640 and 641

== Religion ==
There are three churches and two vicarages in Shevington, the oldest being St. Anne's Church. There is also Shevington Methodist Church and St. Bernadette's Roman Catholic Church. All three churches provide worship for Christians and social and community activities for the whole village.

== Amenities ==
The Shevington community consists of a mixture of private and council housing, predominantly centred on two rows of shops in the centre of the village. Shevington has two pharmacies, one newsagents, a post office, a small supermarket, two bakers' shops, a carpet shop, a fish and chip shop, an estate agent, three hairdressers, a hardware store, three takeaways, a restaurant called juniper, a bistro-style bar, a Conservative club and a public house. There is also a clinic, a doctors' surgery and a library.

Shevington also has a public park, containing a war memorial to those lost during the 20th century's both world wars.

== Sport ==
Shevington has an amateur rugby league club called Shevington Sharks who play in the North West Counties League. Home games are played at Vicarage Lane, Shevington & Bramble Way, Parbold. The Shevington football team, Shevington FC, plays its matches on Vicarage Lane and the recreation ground behind the Methodist church. Gathurst Golf Club is also in the village.

== See also ==
- Listed buildings in Shevington
