= Listed buildings in Wrightington =

Wrightington is a civil parish in the West Lancashire district of Lancashire, England. It contains 35 buildings that are recorded in the National Heritage List for England as designated listed buildings. Of these, four are at Grade II*, the middle grade, and the others are at Grade II, the lowest grade. The parish is mainly rural, and contains the village of Appley Bridge and the community of Wrightington Bar. A high proportion of the listed buildings in the parish are houses or cottages and associated structures, or farmhouses and farm buildings. The Leeds and Liverpool Canal runs through the parish and two of its locks are listed. The other listed buildings include churches, a school, a bridge, and a milestone.

== Key ==
| Grade | Criteria |
|---|---|
| II* | Particularly important buildings of more than special interest |
| II | Buildings of national importance and special interest |

== Buildings ==
| Name and location | Photograph | Date | Notes | Grade |
|---|---|---|---|---|
| Barn, Harrock Hall; 53.60690°N 2.74548°W | — | 16th century (probable) | The barn was altered in the 18th century. It is cruck framed with sandstone walls and a shingle roof. The barn has a wagon entrance, a doorway, and ventilation slits. To the east is a shippon wing, containing doorways, pitching holes, and with external stone steps. Inside the barn are seven cruck trusses. | II |
| Former barn and riding school, Wrightington Hall; 53.59076°N 2.70903°W | — | 16th or 17th century (probable) | The barn was probably originally timber framed and encased in stone in the early 18th century. A cross-wing extending to the north was added later, and in the 17th or 18th century a riding school was added to the east end. Both buildings have been used later for other purposes. They are in sandstone with slate roofs. | II |
| Harrock Hall; 53.60621°N 2.74548°W | | Early 17th century | A country house that was extended in the 19th century. It is in two storeys and has a symmetrical plan with a central range, protruding cross wings, and porches in the angles. In the centre of the front is a canted bay window with five sides of an octagon. The windows are mullioned and transomed, and at the top are rounded battlements. The porches have two storeys and contain round-headed outer doorways with imposts, and inner doorways with Tudor arched heads. The wings have quoins and contains three-light sash windows with Gothick tracery. | II* |
| Charity Farmhouse; 53.61773°N 2.72688°W | — | 17th century | A sandstone house with a stone-slate roof in two storeys. It consists of a main range and a cross wing at the left. The windows are mullioned with hood moulds, and the doorway has a moulded surround and a segmental head. There is another doorway in the cross wing with plain reveals. | II |
| Draper's Farmhouse; 53.58511°N 2.72796°W | — | 17th century | The farmhouse is in sandstone with a concrete tile roof, and is in two storeys. The main range has a south front of two bays, with a gabled cross wing to the right that has an east front of three bays. Most of the windows are mullioned, and there is also a French window. The doorway has a glazed porch. | II |
| North Tunley Farmhouse; 53.61537°N 2.71374°W | — | 17th century | The farmhouse is in brick, mostly rendered, with sandstone dressings and an artificial stone roof, and is in two storeys. On the front is a two-storey porch, there is one bay on each side, and a cross wing to the left. The porch has a doorway with a chamfered surround and a canted head. The windows are 20th-century casements. Inside the house is a bressumer. | II |
| Barn, North Tunley Farm; 53.61513°N 2.71413°W | — | 17th century (probable) | The barn is partly timber-framed with brick infill, and partly in brick, and it has a roof of slate and stone-slate. There are lean-to additions at both ends, and at the right is an addition at right angles that has external stone steps leading to a doorway in the gable. Inside the barn are two cruck trusses with wattle and daub panels. | II |
| South Tunley Hall Farmhouse; 53.60414°N 2.70555°W | | 17th century | This was originally a house with an H-shaped plan that was partly demolished in 1958, leaving the west cross wing and a rebuilt hall range. It is in brick on a sandstone plinth with quoins and a slate roof. There are two storeys with an attic. The main range has two bays, and a single-storey lean-to sandstone porch containing a doorway with a chamfered surround and a canted head with an inscribed lintel. | II |
| Spring Bank; 53.58351°N 2.71965°W | — | 17th century | A house partly timber-framed and partly in sandstone with a stone-slate roof, in two storeys. The windows are mixed; some are mullioned, and others are sashes, of which some are horizontal sliding sashes. The doorway has plain reveals. | II |
| Douglas Bank Farmhouse; 53.57076°N 2.72470°W | — | 1656 | The former farmhouse has a front of sandstone, with brick on the sides and rear, and a stone-slate roof. It has two storeys and attics, and an H-shaped plan with a one-bay central range and two-bay cross wings. The porch is in the east wing, and has a Tudor arched doorway with a chamfered surround, above which is a datestone. Most of the windows are mullioned. At the rear of the west wing is a stair turret, and at the rear of the east wing is another doorway with a Tudor arched head. Inside the house are an inglenook and a bressumer. | II |
| Copyhold Farmhouse; 53.61889°N 2.69709°W | — | 1659 | The farmhouse is mainly in brick on a sandstone plinth with sandstone dressings and a stone-slate roof. It has two storeys and an attic, with a two-storey porch and a cross wing at the right. The front wall of the wing is in sandstone. The windows are mullioned, and there is blue brick diapering on the front. Above the doorway is an inscribed lintel. Inside the house is an unusual large decorative plaster wall panel in deep relief. | II |
| Aspinall's Farmhouse; 53.57050°N 2.72318°W | | 1663 | A sandstone farmhouse on a plinth in two storeys with a basement and an attic. On the front is a 20th-century gabled porch above which is a datestone. To the left of the porch is a mullioned window in each floor, and to the right is a casement window in each floor. In the west gable wall are more mullioned windows, and attic window, and two datestones. At the rear are a basement doorway with a Tudor arched head, more doorways, a sliding sash window, and a stair window. | II* |
| Barn, Aspinall's Farm; 53.57070°N 2.72342°W | | 1663 | The barn is mainly in sandstone with a south gable wall in brick and a stone-slate roof. It has five bays, and contains a full-height wagon doorway, another doorway, windows, and a loading door. | II |
| Farm buildings, Halliwell Farm; 53.57190°N 2.72891°W | — | 1663 | The farm buildings consist of a barn and a cart shed, and are in sandstone with quoins and a composition tile roof. The barn has four bays, containing an aisle. and a west wing. There is a full-height wagon entrance, ventilation slits, and a datestone. In the wing are two segmental-headed arches and a loft doorway. | II |
| Halliwell Farmhouse; 53.57176°N 2.72924°W | — | 1671 | Originally a country house, then a farmhouse, and later a private house, it was reduced and altered in the 18th century. The house is in sandstone with a plinth, quoins, and a stone-slate roof. It consists of an 18th-century one-bay main range, and a 17th-century two-bay cross wing at the east. The two-storey gabled porch contains a round-headed doorway with a moulded surround and imposts, above which is a datestone. The windows are mullioned or mullioned and transomed. Inside the house is a timber-framed partition. | II* |
| Higher Barn Farmhouse; 53.60603°N 2.73416°W | — | Late 17th century | The farmhouse contains earlier material, and is in sandstone with a stone-slate roof. There is a two-storey porch with one bay on each side. The windows were originally mullioned but most of the mullions have been lost. The doorway has plain reveals. Inside the farmhouse are timber-framed partitions, part of a cruck truss, and an inglenook with a bressumer. | II |
| Raby Fold Farmhouse and Cottage; 53.61173°N 2.70751°W | — | Late 17th century (probable) | The building is in sandstone with quoins and slate roofs, and is in two storeys with attics. It has a modified T-shaped plan, with a two-bay main range, a small porch wing to the front, and a rear wing incorporating a cottage with an extension. Most of the windows are mullioned, although some mullions have been lost. There is a doorway with a Tudor arched head and an inscribed lintel. Inside the main range is a timber-framed partition, and both the main range and the cottage contain an inglenook and a bressumer. | II |
| Skull House; 53.58419°N 2.72166°W | — | Late 17th century (probable) | The house contains earlier material and it was later altered. It is basically cruck-framed, and encased in brick and stone, which is pebbledashed, and has an artificial stone roof. There is a central two-storey gabled range, and two flanking wings of one storey with attics. The windows are mullioned. Attached to the house is a large water trough carved from a single block of sandstone. Inside the house is at least one cruck truss, and there is also a bressumer. | II |
| Willow Barn; 53.62368°N 2.69385°W | — | Late 17th century | The house is in brick on a stone plinth with additions in stone and with a roof of stone slate at the front and slate at the rear. It is in two storeys. The windows in the ground floor have plain reveals and in the upper floor they are mullioned. | II |
| South Tunley Farmhouse; 53.60428°N 2.70425°W | — | 1675 | A sandstone farmhouse with quoins and a concrete tile roof in two storeys. It has a half-H-shaped plan with a central range and cross wings. There is a single-storey gabled porch that has a doorway with a chamfered surround and a canted head, above which is an inscribed stone. The windows are mullioned, and inside the house is a bressumer. | II |
| Cowlings Farmhouse; 53.61611°N 2.70634°W | — | 1677 | The farmhouse is rendered on a stone base with a concrete tile roof, and is in two storeys. On the front is a two-storey gabled porch, and to the right of it are two bays. The porch contains a segmental-headed doorway that has a keystone carved with a vase, and above it is an inscribed plaque. The windows are 20th-century casements. | II |
| Tunley Presbyterian Church and Sunday School; 53.60619°N 2.69918°W | | 1691 | The church and school were rebuilt in 1880. They are in sandstone, the church has a roof in stone-slate, and the school has a slate roof. The church windows are mullioned, there is an open timber bellcote on the west gable, and against the west wall is a porch added in 1971. The roof of the school runs at right angles to the church. In its south gable wall is a window and a doorway, both with plain reveals, and a datestone. | II |
| Gate piers and garden wall, Harrock Hall; 53.60649°N 2.74529°W | — | c. 1700 | The walls and piers are in sandstone. There is a pair of piers in the centre, a pier at each end, and a smaller pier and the midpoint of both walls. All the piers are square with a cornice and a ball finial, and the central and end piers have channelled rustication. | II |
| Gate piers and garden wall, South Tunley Farmhouse; 53.60421°N 2.70415°W | — | c. 1700 | The pair of gate piers and the garden wall are in sandstone. The wall has half-round copings with quoined reveals. It is surmounted by slim square piers with cornices and ball finials. | II |
| Wrightington Hall; 53.59017°N 2.70926°W | | c. 1700 | Originally a country house, later part of a hospital, it is in sandstone with a hipped slate roof. The building has a symmetrical east front of seven bays, the middle three bays recessed, a south front of five bays, and a west front of seven bays with a single-storey porch in front of the central three bays. To the north is a three-storey three-bay former link to a building, now demolished. Many of the windows have been altered; some have architraves with pediments, and there are 19th-century attic dormers. | II* |
| Toogood Farmhouse; 53.61275°N 2.71850°W | — | 1708 | A sandstone farmhouse with a stone-slate roof in two storeys. It has a two-storey gabled porch flanked by one bay on each side. In the porch is a doorway with an architrave, a blocked window, and a carved plaque. The windows have stone sills and lintels, and plain reveals. | II |
| Highmoor; 53.60107°N 2.74501°W | — | 18th century | A sandstone house with chamfered quoins and an artificial stone roof. It has two storeys and a symmetrical two-bay front. The doorway has a rusticated surround, a keystone, and stepped voussoirs. The windows are 20th-century casements, and have architraves with keystones. | II |
| Southern lock, Appley Locks; 53.58031°N 2.72880°W | | 1774 (probable) | The lock is lined with sandstone, and there is a footbridge at the western end. | II |
| Wrightington Bridge; 53.59210°N 2.70531°W | | 1778 | The bridge, which was widened in 1927, carries the A5209 road (Hall Lane) over Wrightington Pond. It is in sandstone and consists of three segmental arches, the central arch being the largest. It has a balustrade canted upward towards the centre, a moulded cornice below, and at the ends are panelled piers. | II |
| Eastern lock, Appley Locks; 53.58097°N 2.73062°W | — | Early 19th century (probable) | The lock is lined with sandstone and has double gates. There is a footbridge at the western end, and to the north is a spillway lined with sandstone. | II |
| Milestone; 53.61453°N 2.70509°W | — | 19th century | The milestone is in sandstone and has a square plan and a rounded top. It has a cast iron plate inscribed with the distance in miles to Preston. | II |
| Terrace Wall, Wrightington Hall; 53.59001°N 2.70919°W | — | Mid 19th century | The garden wall retaining the terrace to the south and west of the hall is in sandstone and has copings. The wall contains tapering piers surmounted by urn finials. | II |
| Station House; 53.57871°N 2.71927°W | | 1855 | A railway station and stationmaster's house built by the Lancashire and Yorkshire Railway for the line between Wigan and Southport. It is in sandstone with a slate roof, and is in Tudor style. The central portion has two storeys with a projecting gabled wing containing a canted bay window and a two-light window above. On the sides are Tudor arched doorways. Flanking the central section are single-storey wings. | II |
| St James' Church; 53.61693°N 2.71745°W | | 1857 | The church, designed by E. G. Paley, is in sandstone with a slate roof. It consists of a nave, a south aisle and porch, and a chancel. The gabled west wall contains a wheel window, and on the apex is a bellcote. The other windows are lancets. | II |
| St Joseph's Church and presbytery 53.59265°N 2.70077°W | | 1892–94 | A Roman Catholic church by James Sinnott, in sandstone with a slate roof. It consists of a nave with a south porch, transepts, a tower with a pyramidal roof at the crossing, and a chancel with a three-sided apse. In the north transept are two lancet windows and a rose window. The south transept also has a rose window and a single-storey link to the presbytery. Inside the church is an intricate ironwork canopy. The presbytery has two square bay windows with hipped roofs containing sashes with mullions. | II |
