= Bispham, Lancashire =

Bispham, Lancashire may refer to:

- Bispham, Blackpool
- Bispham, a civil parish containing the village of Bispham Green, West Lancashire
