= Andy Saunders (author, born 1974) =

British author and Imaging specialist

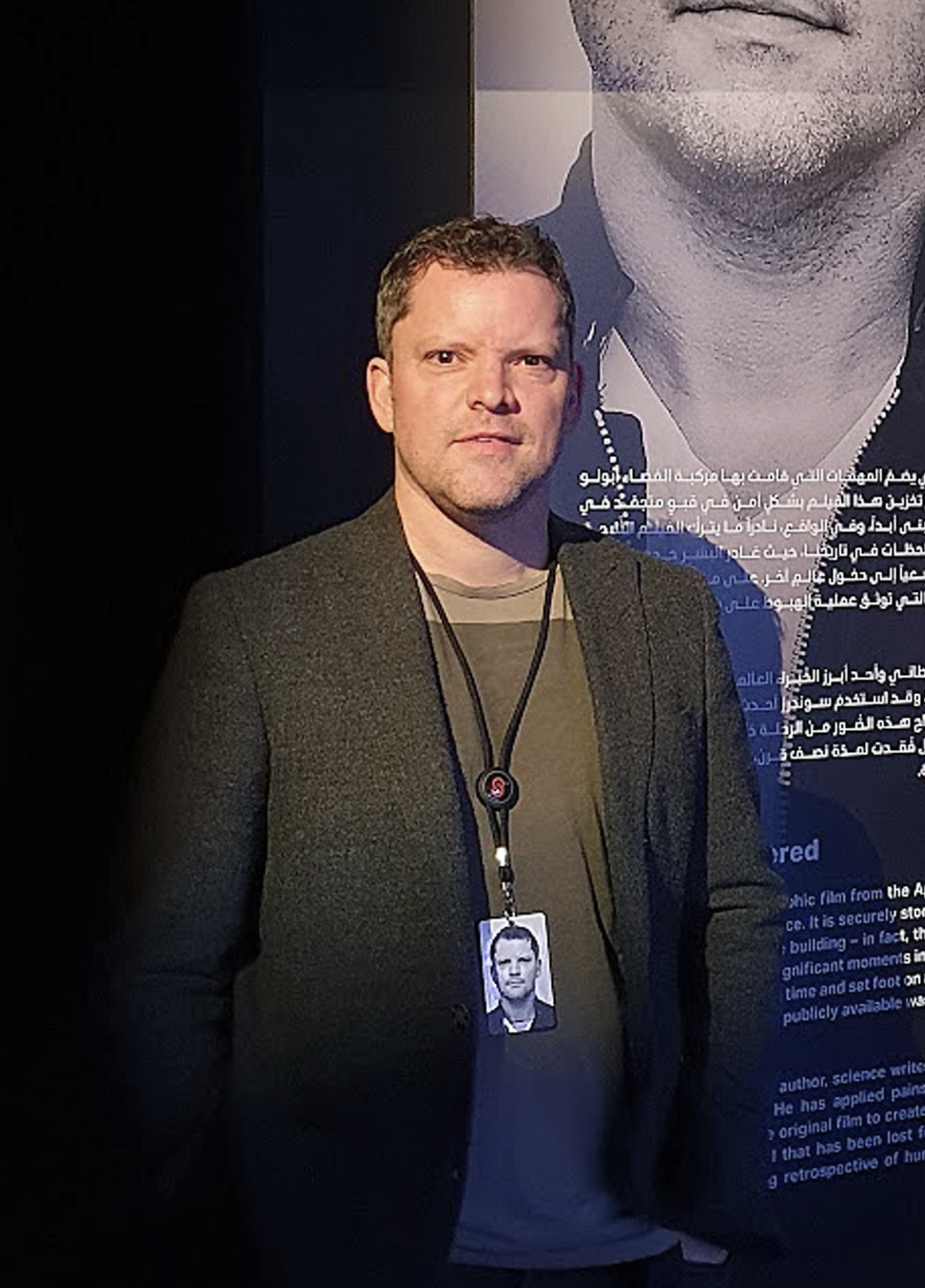
Andy Saunders at Xposure 2023

Andy Saunders is a British author and imaging specialist who specialises in historical NASA imagery. He is best known for creating the only clear image of Neil Armstrong on the moon and for his book, Apollo Remastered.

== Early life ==
Saunders was born in 1974 in Appley Bridge, near Wigan in England and went to Loughborough University.

He moved to Culcheth, near Warrington, where he worked in logistics management and home renovations before he began restoring old film of the Apollo space missions.

== Film restoration ==
Saunders started working on historic film in around 2010 when he applied a stacking technique to 16 mm movie footage "to produce a clear, recognisable image of Neil Armstrong on the moon". He released the image in 2019, which made the front page of The Daily Telegraph on Apollo 11's 50th anniversary.

In 2020 he developed a digital processing technique for film which helped reveal life on board Apollo 13 mission, and published a detailed photographic analysis for NASA, of the damage caused by the explosion that crippled the Service Module. In 2021 he produced more digitally enhanced images. Also in 2021, he produced clear images of the moment Alan Shepard became the first American in space in 1961. Then in 2022, he produced a further series of images for the 60th anniversary of John Glenn's orbital flight.

From 2019 to 2022, Saunders undertook a project to assess NASA's archive of 35,000 still photographs and 10 hours of 16 mm movie footage and digitally remaster the film. The remastered images are widely regarded by astronauts and publications as the "highest quality" photographs produced of humankind's first missions to the moon.

A book, Apollo Remastered, was released in September 2022 by Penguin Random House in the UK, and Hachette Book Group in the US. The book contains 400 images of the Apollo missions as well as chapters covering the development of specialist photographic equipment, the history of space photography and the techniques used to remaster the images. Apollo Remastered became the highest-grossing photography book for 20 years and the biggest selling book on the Apollo programme since records began. Timed with the 50th anniversaries of each Apollo mission, Saunders released restored images.

In 2023 Saunders collaborated with Tom Hanks, Christopher Riley and 59 Productions as Consultant Producer on The Moonwalkers: A Journey With Tom Hanks, an immersive experience show at London's Lightroom.

In August 2025, Gemini and Mercury Remastered, was released by Penguin Random House in the UK, and Hachette Book Group in the US. The book contains remastered images and commentary about space travel dating back to the 1960s.

== Apollo Remastered exhibition ==
The Apollo Remastered exhibition opened in September 2022 at London's Royal Albert Hall, before moving to Glasgow, the United Arab Emirates, Jodrell Bank, the Williamson Art Gallery and Museum in north west England and Hexham Art and Hexham Art Centre In late 2023, an outdoor exhibition was also hosted around King's Cross in London.

The Gemini and Mercury Remastered exhibitions will be held at Jodrell Bank and the Royal Albert Hall in 2025.

== Awards ==
- 2023: Award for Scientific Imaging Winner, Royal Photographic Society
- 2023: Book Of The Year, Space Hipsters
- 2024: Sir Arthur Clarke Award for Space Achievement – Media, broadcast and written Individual, from the Arthur C. Clarke Foundation / British Interplanetary Society
- 2025: Hurter and Driffield Medal, Royal Photographic Society
