= Listed buildings in Shevington =

Shevington is a civil parish in the Metropolitan Borough of Wigan, Greater Manchester, England. The parish contains eight listed buildings that are recorded in the National Heritage List for England. All the listed buildings are designated at Grade II, the lowest of the three grades, which is applied to "buildings of national importance and special interest". The parish contains the villages of Shevington and Gathurst and the surrounding countryside. The Leeds and Liverpool Canal passes through the parish, and the listed buildings associated with it are a bridge, locks, and a lock-keeper's cottage. The other listed buildings are a farmhouse, farm buildings, a public house with a mounting block, and a school and master's house.

== Buildings ==
Name and location	Photograph	Date	Notes
Barn, Club House Farm; 53.57184°N 2.68540°W	—	1660	The barn is in stone with some brick, quoins, and a slate roof. It has four bays, a cow house with a catslide roof to the north, and a lean-to garage on the south. The building contains barn doors, windows, a datestone, vents, and a pitching hole.
Club House Farmhouse; 53.57169°N 2.68516°W	—	1663	The farmhouse is timber framed with stone cladding and a slate roof. There are two storeys and four bays, the left bay projecting forward and gabled and the right bay an extension. Some windows are mullioned and transomed, some are casements, and there are two French windows. Inside is a bressumer, and timber framed partitions with wattle and daub infill.
Farm building, Forest Fold Farm; 53.56922°N 2.70981°W	—	Late 17th century	The farm building is in brick on a stone plinth, with stone dressings, quoins, a band, and a concrete tile roof. There are two storeys, with external steps leading up to a granary. It contains mullioned windows and doorways, all with keyed lintels, ventilation holes in stone concave-sided diamonds, and a pitching hole.
Hesketh Arms public house and adjacent mounting block 53.59033°N 2.69222°W		18th century	Originally a public house, the building was later converted for other uses and had earlier been enlarged with a 19th-century assembly room and subsequent extensions. The building is in millstone grit with stone-slate roofs with some slate, and has two storeys. The original part has three bays, a central round-headed doorway with voussoirs, a giant keystone, and a fanlight. Above it is a canopy with a hipped roof. At the top of the bay is a pedimented gable and three ball finials. The windows are sashes with wedge lintels. The assembly roof has two bays and sash windows, and in front of it is a two-step mounting block.
Dean Locks; 53.56162°N 2.70260°W		c. 1781	A pair of staggered parallel locks on the Leeds and Liverpool Canal. They are in stone, the northern lock has timber gates, and the southern lock has iron gates. There are timber footbridges, and a weir between the two locks.
Gathurst Bridge; 53.56148°N 2.69512°W		1780s	The bridge carries Gathurst Lane (B5206 road) over the Leeds and Liverpool Canal. It is in stone, and consists of a single elliptical arch with a cambered band, a parapet, and end piers.
Dean Locks Cottage; 53.56159°N 2.70306°W		Late 18th or early 19th century	A house adjacent to Dean Locks on the Leeds and Liverpool Canal, it is in stone with a concrete tile roof. There are two storeys, two bays, a gabled outshut on the right, and a brick outshut at the rear. The doorway has an architrave and a fanlight, and the windows are sashes with architraves. In the right outshut is a canted bay window with a hipped roof.
Master's house and school 53.57175°N 2.70089°W		1814	The house and school are in stone with a slate roof, four bays, and a single-depth plan. There are windows on two storeys, to the right is a single-story entrance lobby, and the house has a separate entrance to the left. On the upper floor is an inscribed plaque. At the rear are two French windows, and mullioned windows, one of which also has a transom.
