= Theodore Major =

English artist (1908–1999)

Theodore Major (19 February 1908 – 17 January 1999) was an English artist who was considered a great individualist of British Art. Major's pictures have been described as "among the best English paintings of our time".

== Biography ==
Born in Wigan, Lancashire, England, Major insisted that he was essentially self-taught as an artist. He studied at Wigan Art School between 1927 and 1932, and taught there between 1930 and 1950, and in 1952 founded the Wigan Arts Club.

Major established a reputation as a Lancashire artist. He drew cartoons for the Daily Mail and The Manchester Guardian. He shared exhibitions with his friend and contemporary L. S. Lowry and had shows at the art galleries of Carlisle and Blackburn which were sponsored by the Arts Council. He was a member of the Manchester Group, along with Lowry, exhibiting at the Mid-Day Studios founded and run by Margo Ingham and Ned Owens.

Major is especially known for his gritty impasto monochrome industrial paintings, poignant Atomic Series, savage Monsters of War series, flowing nudes, lonely seascapes and atmospheric landscapes. "To disturb and extend consciousness in the mind of the viewer" was his declared aim. He declined to sell pictures, "not to the people who want them, the rich people". He eventually had to buy the house, next door to his studio in Appley Bridge, as a store. He used a small front bedroom, with a good light, as a studio. He kept around 3000 of his pictures back from sale, saying that they were painted for ordinary people, not money. He used the house next door as a gallery and the general public were welcome to view his paintings free of charge.

The art critic and novelist John Berger has described Major's pictures as "among the best English paintings of our time".
