= Richard Durning's Endowed Primary School =

- Bispham Green; United Kingdom

Information
- Former name: Bispham Free Grammar School (until 1951)
- Founder: Richard Durning
- Authority: Lancashire
- Principal: Rebecca Whitfield
- Age range: 3 to 11
- Enrollment: 86 pupils in 2025
- Website: https://www.richarddurnings.lancs.sch.uk/

Richard Durning's Endowed Primary School is Voluntary controlled school for 3-11 year olds in Bispham Green in Lancashire in the United Kingdom. It was founded in 1692, when Richard Durning left £100 in his will for a school.

== History ==
The school was founded in 1692 and was endowed with £100 from Richard Dunning's will. The building was in Bispham, next to the Inn.

By 1825 the school had 35 boys attending, but was described as being in decline.

The commissioners report in 1868 was grim, describing the school as one of the best endowed but least efficient. Children attending were from poor families: their parents were quarrymen, colliers, farmers and labourers. Boys and girls had previously been taught together but were now taught separately. The commissioner wrote that attendance was irregular, especially for the older girls.

In 2016 the school received an "Outstanding" grade from Ofsted.
