= Royal Albert Edward Infirmary =

British hospital

- Wrightington, Wigan and Leigh NHS Foundation Trust
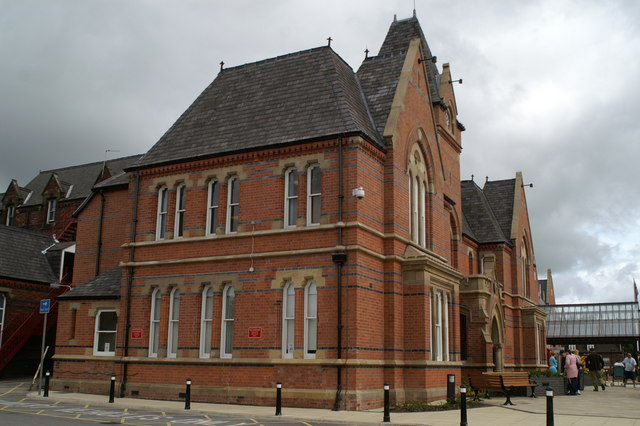
- Royal Albert Edward Infirmary

- Shown in Greater Manchester

Geography
- Location: Wigan Lane, Wigan, Greater Manchester, England, United Kingdom
- Coordinates: 53.5581°N 2.6296°W

Organisation
- Care system: Public NHS
- Type: General hospital

Services
- Emergency department: Yes Accident & Emergency

History
- Founded: 1796

Links
- Website: www.wwl.nhs.uk
- Lists: Hospitals in England

The Royal Albert Edward Infirmary, also known as the Wigan Infirmary, is a health facility in Wigan Lane, Wigan, Greater Manchester, England. It is managed by the Wrightington, Wigan and Leigh NHS Foundation Trust.

== History ==
The facility has its origins in the Wigan Dispensary which was established in King Street in 1796. The foundation stone for the current facility in Wigan Lane was laid by the Earl of Crawford in 1870. General Sir James Lindsay, who had seen action in the Red River Rebellion, was in attendance for the ceremony. The new building, which was designed by Thomas Worthington and Joseph Hanson, was opened by the Prince and Princess of Wales in 1873. A children's ward was added in 1877 and it joined the National Health Service in 1948. A major extension, in the same architectural style as the original building, was completed in 2004. In September 2019 the trust announced that an extra ward might be created to respond to growing demand for beds.

In May 2020, a new ward dedicated to treating COVID-19 patients was opened in the hospital. The Bryn Ward has 50 beds with 27 of those being used for intensive care. The modular unit was built in the Infirmary's car park.

In 2021, a new £7.6 million community assessment unit, with 21 beds, was opened in the Infirmary.
