= Shevington High School =

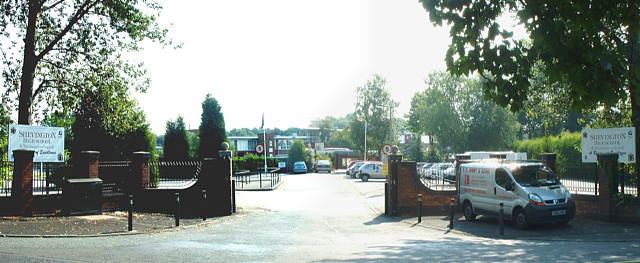
- Entrance to Shevington High

Location
- Shevington Lane; Shevington; Wigan, Greater Manchester, WN6 8AB; England; 53°34′47″N 2°41′02″W

Information
- Type: Community school
- Motto: Committed to excellence
- Established: 1959; 67 years ago
- Local authority: Wigan Council
- Department for Education URN: 106529 Tables
- Ofsted: Reports
- Headteacher: John Bennett
- Gender: Coeducational
- Age: 11 to 16
- Enrolment: 792 as of April 2022
- Website: http://www.shevingtonhigh.org.uk/

Shevington High School is a coeducational secondary school located in Shevington in the Metropolitan Borough of Wigan in Greater Manchester, England.

It is a community school administered by Wigan Metropolitan Borough Council, and offers GCSEs. Graduating students often go on to attend St John Rigby College, Runshaw College, Wigan and Leigh College, Southport College or Winstanley College.

It was founded as a County Secondary School in 1959, as part of Lancashire County Council's Education Expansion Programme, on its site near Stockley Wood where it still is based today. During the 1970s, it became a comprehensive school under the control of Wigan Council after the 1974 local government reorganisation.

== Notable former pupils ==
- Ben Batt, actor
- Junior Nsemba, professional rugby league footballer at Wigan Warriors
- Neil Whitworth, former professional footballer
