= Gathurst =

Coordinates: 53.559°N 2.697°W

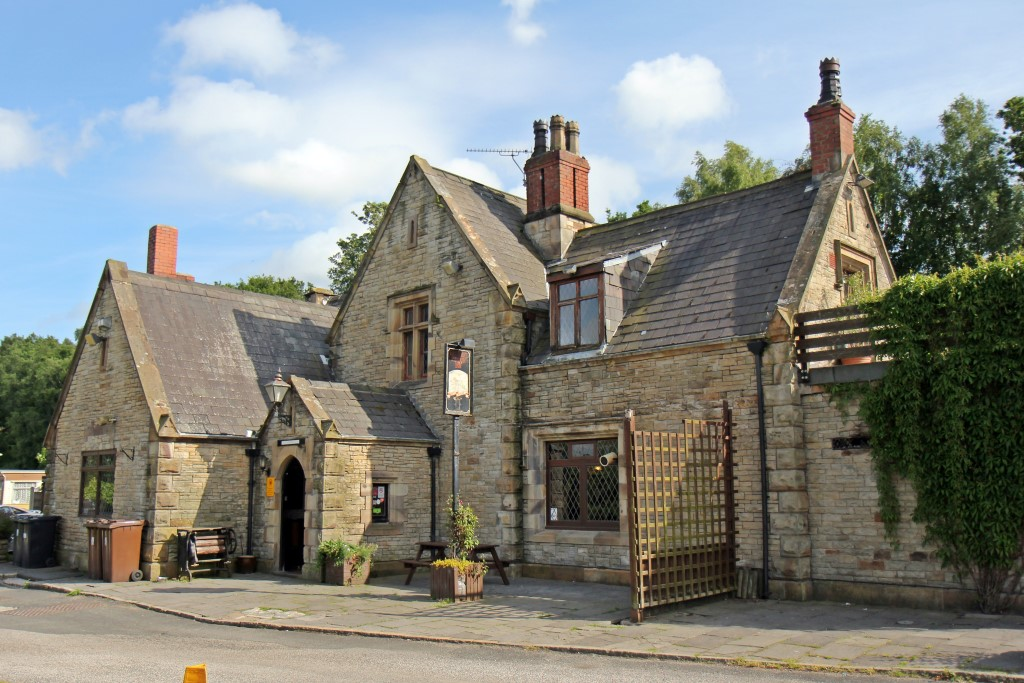
- The Gathurst Station Inn public house, Gathurst

- Location within Greater Manchester
- OS grid reference: SD538071
- Metropolitan borough: Wigan
- Metropolitan county: Greater Manchester
- Region: North West
- Country: England
- Sovereign state: United Kingdom
- Post town: WIGAN
- Postcode district: WN6
- Dialling code: 01257
- Police: Greater Manchester
- Fire: Greater Manchester
- Ambulance: North West
- UK Parliament: Wigan

Gathurst (/ɡæθɜːst/, locally /ɡæθʊst/) is the name given to a small section of the township of Shevington, a Civil Parish within the Metropolitan Borough of Wigan, Greater Manchester, England. It was historically a part of Lancashire. The village is served by a railway station Gathurst railway station which is located on the Manchester-Southport line and managed by Northern. The station also serves the nearby village of Shevington.

== Transport ==
- Gathurst railway station

== See also ==
- Listed buildings in Shevington
