= Wrightington, Wigan and Leigh NHS Foundation Trust =

NHS Foundation Trust

Wrightington, Wigan and Leigh Teaching Hospitals NHS Foundation Trust
- Former name: Wrightington, Wigan and Leigh NHS Foundation Trust; Wrightington Hospital NHS Trust; Wigan and Leigh Health Services NHS Trust
- Type: NHS hospital trust
- Established: 1 April 2001
- Headquarters: Royal Albert Edward Infirmary, Wigan
- Region served: NATIONAL
- Population: 326,000
- Budget: £397 million
- Hospitals: Royal Albert Edward Infirmary; Wrightington Hospital; Leigh Infirmary
- Chair: Robina Shah
- Chief executive: Mary Fleming
- Website: www.wwl.nhs.uk

Wrightington, Wigan and Leigh Teaching Hospitals (WWL) NHS Foundation Trust is an NHS Foundation Trust providing services in the Metropolitan Borough of Wigan and Wrightington in West Lancashire, England. It was formed on 1 April 2001 by the merger of Wrightington Hospital NHS Trust and Wigan and Leigh Health Services NHS Trust, and became an NHS Foundation Trust in December 2008. "Teaching Hospitals" has been included in its name since 1 April 2020.

== Facilities ==
The Trust operates several hospital and outpatient sites:

- Royal Albert Edward Infirmary (Wigan)
- Leigh Infirmary
- Wrightington Hospital
- Thomas Linacre Centre
- Hanover Diagnostic and Treatment Centre
- WWL Eye Unit

In June 2013, a new children's outpatient department was opened at the Thomas Linacre Centre; it has bright decor inspired by the colours of the rainbow and a games console in the main waiting area.

On 1 April 2019, community services transferred into the foundation trust and these are delivered from numerous premises across Wigan.

== Performance ==
According to the most recent Care Quality Commission report published in March 2018, the Trust handled 74,367 inpatient admissions, 676,690 outpatient attendances, 88,718 A&E attendances, 2,436 deliveries and 1,362 deaths between August 2016 and July 2017.

=== A&E ===
WWL has not met the NHS four-hour A&E target since October 2015. However, the latest figures, from May 2018, show that the Trust only just fell below the 95% target, with 94.3% of patients seen within four hours, compared to the national average of 90.4%. This ranked WWL 25 out of 133 trusts. In 2022 it was reported that it was “increasingly common” for patients to die in the accident and emergency department. The report said "Of the 72 patients in A&E as I write this, 16 have been there over 24 hours and 34 over 12 hours. The longest stay is almost 48 hours."

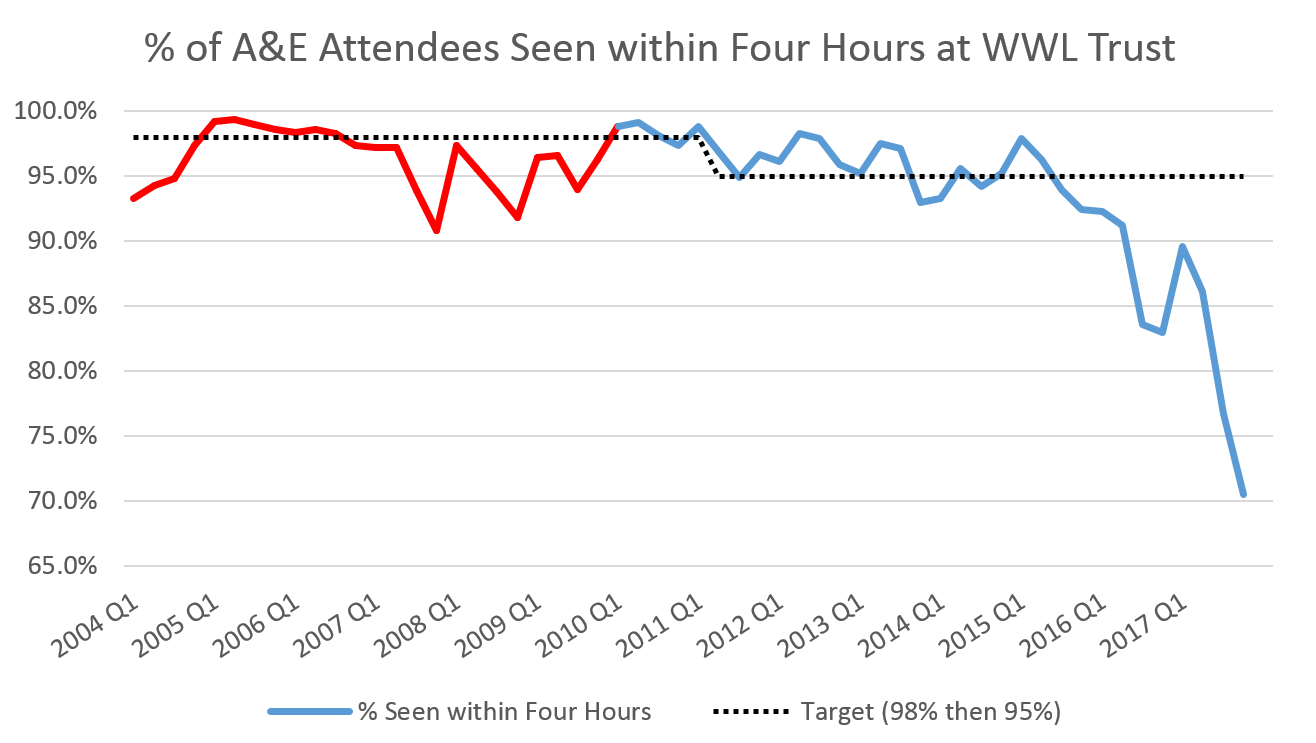
WWL Four-Hour A&E Performance, from NHS England quarterly figures

=== Cancer Care ===
In April 2018, WWL ranked 18 out of 133 trusts in the area of cancer care, with 91.7% of patients beginning treatment within 62 days of an urgent GP referral. This is above the target of 85% and well exceeds the national average of 82.3%.

=== Planned Operations ===
In April 2018, WWL ranked 5 out of 128 trusts when it came to planned operations and care, with 94.3% of patients waiting less than 18 weeks. This is above the target of 92% and well exceeds the national average of 87.5%.

=== Awards ===
The Health Service Journal named WWL as Provider Trust of the Year in November 2014 on the basis that their strong focus on staff engagement had helped them to reduce mortality rates while achieving a cash surplus. It also won the awards for Improving Environmental and Social Sustainability and Patient Safety. In 2015, it was named by the Health Service Journal as the second best acute trust to work for. At that time, it had 4,169 full-time equivalent staff and a sickness absence rate of 4.71%. 78% of staff recommend it as a place for treatment and 77% recommended it as a place to work.

== Controversy ==
=== WWL Solutions ===
On 3 November 2017, the Trust established a subsidiary company, WWL Solutions Ltd, in an attempt to transfer 900 estates and facilities staff, which was ultimately unsuccessful.

The intention was to reduce the Trust's costs by taking advantage of VAT loopholes present in the Value Added Tax Act 1994. The Act provides a mechanism through which NHS trusts can qualify for refunds on services that are contracted out, in comparison to in-house NHS services, which can only claim back VAT on a small subset of goods and services.

The subsidiary company would have also produced payroll savings, by recruiting new staff on less expensive non-NHS contracts.

== See also ==
- Healthcare in Greater Manchester
- List of NHS trusts
