= Appley Bridge railway station =

Railway station in West Lancashire, England

Coordinates: 53.579°N 2.719°W

Appley Bridge
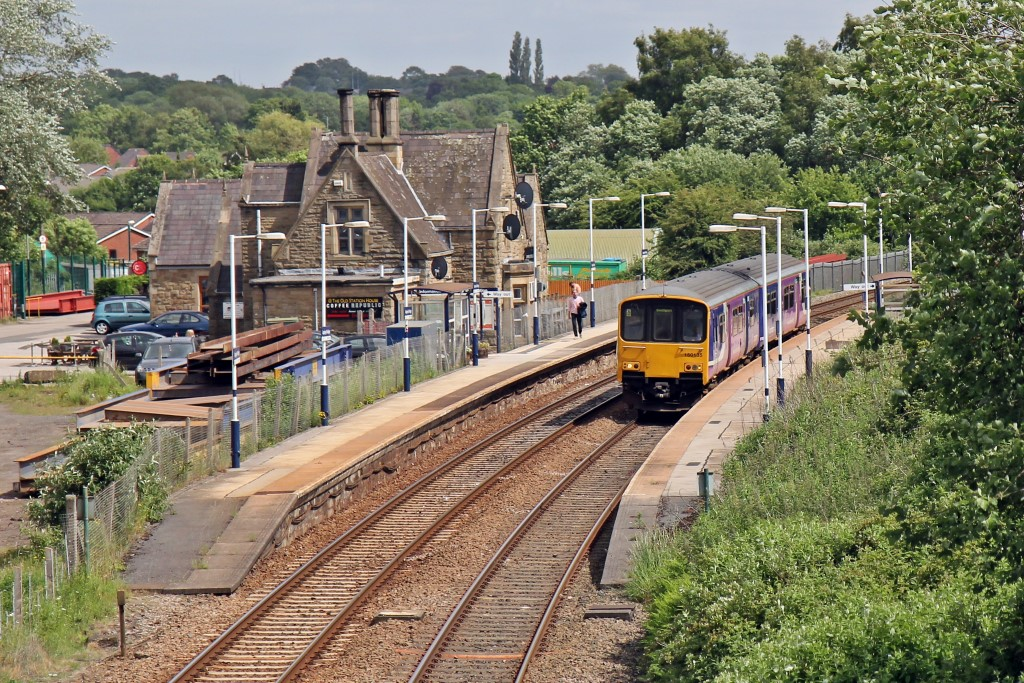
- Appley Bridge station in 2015, with a Northern Rail Class 150 at the Southport-bound platform, seen from the Appley Lane North road bridge.

General information
- Location: Appley Bridge, West Lancashire; England
- Grid reference: SD524093
- Managed by: Northern Trains
- Transit authority: Greater Manchester
- Platforms: 2

Other information
- Station code: APB
- Classification: DfT category F1

History
- Opened: 9 April 1855
- Original company: Lancashire and Yorkshire Railway
- Pre-grouping: Lancashire and Yorkshire Railway
- Post-grouping: London Midland and Scottish Railway

Passengers
- 2020/21: ▼39,006
- 2021/22: ▲0.128 million
- 2022/23: ▲0.131 million
- 2023/24: ▼0.129 million
- 2024/25: ▼0.126 million
Location
Notes
- Passenger statistics from the Office of Rail and Road

Appley Bridge railway station serves the villages of Appley Bridge in West Lancashire and Shevington in the Metropolitan Borough of Wigan, Greater Manchester in England. The station is 4.4 miles (7 km) north-west of Wigan Wallgate on the Manchester-Southport Line. The station is in Lancashire, but is supported by Transport for Greater Manchester (TfGM), and as such is within the TfGM ticketing zone. It is operated by Northern Trains.

The main stone-built station building survives adjacent to the Wigan-bound platform, but is now a public house; there are modest shelters on both platforms for rail travellers.

== History ==
The station opened on 9 April 1855 when the Lancashire and Yorkshire Railway (L&YR) opened the line from Wigan Wallgate to Southport London Street, the line and station had been planned, authorised and construction started by the Manchester and Southport Railway before it was acquired by the L&YR on 3 July 1854. The main stone-built station building (no longer in use) was built during this time, in the standard L&YR style which had been described as "solid, substantial, well built of stone in the Elizabethan style, neat without undue ornament". The L&YR amalgamated with the London and North Western Railway on 1 January 1922, and this, in turn, was grouped into the London, Midland and Scottish Railway (LMS) in 1923. Nationalisation followed in 1948. When sectorisation was introduced in the 1980s, the station was served by Regional Railways until the privatisation of British Rail.

A Greater Manchester Council landfill site and transfer terminal was formerly located a short distance west of the station, served by a siding connection from the up (eastbound) line. This received regular trainloads of domestic waste from terminals in and around Manchester from the early 1980s until 1995, when the site reached capacity and was closed. The defunct siding is still intact and is visible from passing trains.

== Facilities ==
The station is unstaffed, but there is a ticket machine provided to allow passengers to buy prior to travel or collect pre-paid tickets. Train running information can be obtained by phone and timetable posters. There is step-free access to both platforms from the nearby road bridge via ramps.

== Services ==
On Monday to Saturday, there are two trains an hour westbound to Southport and eastbound to Wigan. Beyond here, services run via Bolton to either Stalybridge via Manchester Victoria or Manchester Oxford Road (services beyond there towards Manchester Piccadilly and points south ended at the winter 2022 timetable change).

On Sundays, there is an hourly service to Southport and Blackburn via Walkden and Manchester Victoria.

Preceding station	National Rail	Following station
Parbold	Northern Trains Southport to Manchester Line	Gathurst

== See also ==
- Listed buildings in Wrightington

== Bibliography ==
- Grant, Donald J. (2017). Directory of the Railway Companies of Great Britain (1st ed.). Kibworth Beauchamp, Leicestershire: Troubador Publishing Ltd. ISBN 978-1-78803-768-6.
- Marshall, John (1969). The Lancashire & Yorkshire Railway. Vol. 1. Newton Abbot: David & Charles. ISBN 978-0-7153-4352-4.
- Quick, Michael (2023) [2001]. Railway passenger stations in Great Britain: a chronology (PDF). version 5.05. Railway & Canal Historical Society.
