= Ben Batt =

English actor

- Born: 7 February 1986 (age 40); Wigan, Greater Manchester, England
- Education: Guildhall School of Music and Drama
- Occupation: Actor
- Years active: 2008–present
- Spouse: Rebecca Atkinson (m. 2025)
- Children: 1

Ben Batt (born 7 February 1986) is an English actor, best known for his role as Joe Pritchard in Channel 4's comedy drama Shameless. He has also appeared in Scott & Bailey as DC Kevin Lumb, Alf Rutter in The Village and in Sirens as Craig Scruton, the fireman. He starred as Ted Burgess in the BBC production of The Go-Between broadcast on 20 September 2015. In the 2011 film Weekender set within the late 1980s rave culture, he played the main antagonist John Anderson.

He has also had many smaller roles, such as in Captain America: The First Avenger as an Enlistment Office MP and in The Promise as Private Derek Toogood. Other minor parts include roles in Accused, Salvage, Wire in the Blood, Lewis, Casualty, The Edge of Love, Spooks: Code 9 and Death in Paradise. In season 3 of Jamestown (2019), Batt played Willmus Crabtree, a trader from England with unknown motives and intentions. In 2016, he starred as Stanley Kowalski in A Streetcar Named Desire by Tennessee Williams at the Royal Exchange, Manchester which was directed by Sarah Frankcom.

== Early and personal life ==
Batt was born in Wigan, to parents Alan and Beth. He has an older sister, Sarah, and a younger sister, Holly. He played for Orrell and Lancashire rugby teams as a child. He attended Shevington High School before that St David's primary in Aspull. After sustaining an injury he began acting and enrolled at London's Guildhall School of Music and Drama. He left when he was offered a small role in the film The Edge of Love in 2008.

His wife is Shameless co-star, Rebecca Atkinson, who played Karen Maguire. They met on the set in 2008 and shared numerous storylines together. The couple have a son, born in 2016. Batt and Atkinson were married in March 2025.

== Filmography ==
=== Film ===
Year	Title	Role	Notes
2008	The Edge of Love	Sergeant	
2009	Salvage	Trooper Jones	
2011	Weekender	John Anderson	
2011	Captain America: The First Avenger	Enlistment Officer MP	
2012	A Running Jump	Footballer	Short film
2014	Electricity	Dave	
2016	Despite the Falling Snow	Oleg	
2016	The Windmill Massacre	Jackson	
2018	Dusty and Me	Little Eddie	

=== Television ===
Year	Title	Role	Notes
2008	Casualty	Ian Milton	Episode: "Where's the Art in Heartache?"
2008	Lewis	Milo Hardy	Episode: "Music to Die For"
2008	Spooks: Code 9	Leo Whitelaw	Episode #1.5
2008	Wire in the Blood	Matthew	2 episodes
2009–2010	Shameless	Joe Pritchard	Main role
2010	Accused	Peter MacShane	Episode: "Frankie's Story"
2011	The Promise	Private Derek Toogood	4 episodes
2011	Sirens	Craig Scruton	5 episodes
2011–2013	Scott & Bailey	DC Kevin Lumb	Main role
2013	Death in Paradise	Damon Ryan	Episode: "A Deadly Storm"
2013	Prisoners Wives	Danny	2 episodes
2014	From There to Here	Newell	3 episodes
2014	The Village	Alf Rutter	5 episodes
2015	The Go-Between	Ted Burgess	Television film
2015	From Darkness	Chris Templeton	Miniseries; 2 episodes
2015	Prey	Joseph Kijek	Episode #2.2
2016	Barbarians Rising	Spartacus	Episode: "Rebellion"
2017	In The Dark	DI Paul Hopkins	Miniseries; 4 episodes
2017	W1A	Ryan Chelford	2 episodes
2018	Vera	Tony Everitt	Episode: "Black Ice"
2018–2020	Our Girl	Blue	3 episodes
2019	Jamestown	Willmus Crabtree	8 episodes
2020	The English Game	John Cartwright	6 episodes
2021–2023	Domina	Agrippa	12 episodes
2022	Rules of The Game	Owen Jenkins	4 episodes
2022	McDonald & Dodds	DCI Ethan Fletcher / Philip Henry	Episode: "A Billion Beats"
2024–present	G'wed	Disneyland Darren	Recurring role
2026	Van der Valk	Daan Franken	Episode: "Safe in Amsterdam"
2025	Toxic Town	Pat Miller	Miniseries; 4 episodes
2025	Riot Women	Rudy	5 episodes
2025	Murder Before Evensong	Ned Thwaite	5 episodes
2026	Silent Witness	Jason Marklow	Episode: "Grace of God"

== Stage credits ==
Year	Title	Role	Location
2016	A Streetcar Named Desire	Stanley Kowalski	Royal Exchange
2018	The York Realist	George	Donmar Warehouse
