= Leigh Infirmary =

British hospital

- Wrightington, Wigan and Leigh NHS Foundation Trust
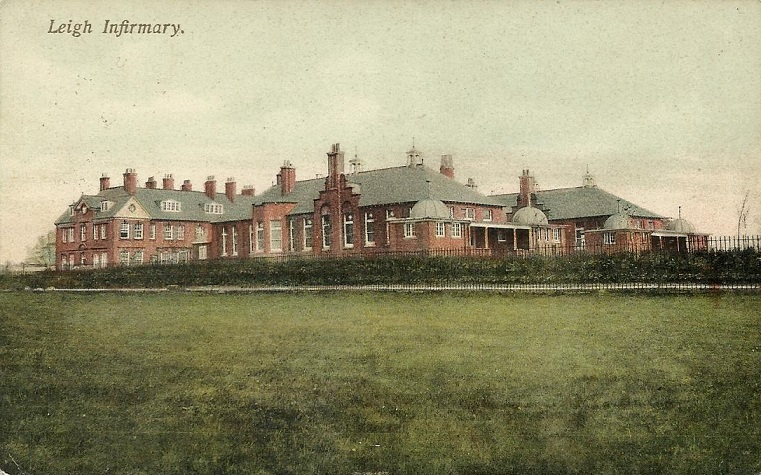
- Leigh Infirmary

- Shown in Greater Manchester

Geography
- Location: The Avenue, Leigh, Greater Manchester, England
- Coordinates: 53.5041°N 2.5121°W

Organisation
- Care system: NHS
- Type: Community hospital

Services
- Emergency department: No

History
- Founded: 1906

Links
- Website: www.wwl.nhs.uk
- Lists: Hospitals in England

Leigh Infirmary is a healthcare facility in The Avenue, Leigh, Greater Manchester, England. It is managed by the Wrightington, Wigan and Leigh NHS Foundation Trust.

== History ==
The site for the facility was a gift from Lord Lilford of Atherton Hall. The facility itself, which was financed by a legacy from Miss Elizabeth Farnworth and by other subscribers, was completed in 1906. A ward was allocated for the treatment of military casualties at the start of the First World War. It joined the National Health Service in 1948. A new diagnostic and treatment centre was officially opened by Andy Burnham, the Shadow Health Secretary and Member of Parliament for the town, in January 2014.
