= Listed buildings in Bispham, West Lancashire =

Civil Parish

Bispham is a civil parish in the West Lancashire district of Lancashire, England. It contains three listed buildings that are recorded in the National Heritage List for England. All the listed buildings are designated at Grade II, the lowest of the three grades, which is applied to "buildings of national importance and special interest". Apart from the village of Bispham Green, the parish is rural. The listed buildings comprise a farmhouse and two farm buildings.

== Buildings ==
Name and location	Photograph	Date	Notes
Barn, Spencer's Farm; 53.61890°N 2.78805°W		c. 1700	A sandstone barn with a stone-slate roof and a plinth. It contains a cart entrance with a segmental head, ventilation slits, a lower entrance, a window, two doorways, and a pitching door.
Bispham Hall Farmhouse; 53.61150°N 2.78088°W	—	Early 18th century	A sandstone house with a stone-slate roof, in two storeys with a symmetrical front of four bays. The two central bays have a cornice and a gable treated as a pediment. The doorway is flanked by pilaster strips. In the pediment is a circular stone sundial with a keystone.
Barn and farm buildings, Grange Farm; 53.61353°N 2.77208°W	—	Undated	The buildings consist of two ranges at right angles to each other, in sandstone with stone-slate roofs. The openings include doors, windows, a cart entrance with a segmental arch, and a pitching door. One of the doorways is blocked. and above it is a re-set inscribed plaque. (Note: Street View in March 2009 shows that the buildings have been converted into domestic use.)

== Notes and references ==
=== Sources ===
- Historic England, "Barn at Spencer's Farm, Bispham (1361831)", National Heritage List for England
- Historic England, "Bispham Hall Farmhouse, Bispham (1278413)", National Heritage List for England
- Historic England, "Barn and attached farm buildings at Grange Farm, Bispham (1230842)", National Heritage List for England
- Historic England, Listed Buildings
