= Gathurst railway station =

Railway station in Greater Manchester, England

Coordinates: 53.5594°N 2.6937°W

Gathurst
- Gathurst railway station in 2024.

General information
- Location: Gathurst, Wigan; England
- Grid reference: SD541071
- Manager: Northern Trains
- Transit authority: Greater Manchester
- Platforms: 2

Other information
- Station code: GST
- Classification: DfT category F1

History
- Opened: 9 April 1855
- Original company: Lancashire and Yorkshire Railway
- Pre-grouping: Lancashire and Yorkshire Railway
- Post-grouping: London Midland and Scottish Railway

Key dates
- about 1934: renamed Gathurst for Shevington
- 5 May 1975: renamed Gathurst

Passengers
- 2020/21: ▼14,426
- 2021/22: ▲71,014
- 2022/23: ▲80,454
- 2023/24: ▼73,518
- 2024/25: ▲74,078
Location
Notes
- Passenger statistics from the Office of Rail and Road

Gathurst railway station is a two-platform railway station on the outskirts of the Metropolitan Borough of Wigan, Greater Manchester, England. The station is on the Southport line 2 3/4 miles (4.4 kilometres) north west of Wigan Wallgate station. It is currently operated by Northern Trains.

The main stone-built station building survives adjacent to the Wigan-bound platform, but is now in use for non-railway purposes (as a public house), modest shelters now being provided on both platforms for rail travellers.

== History ==
The station opened on 9 April 1855 when the Lancashire and Yorkshire Railway (L&YR) opened the line from Wigan Wallgate to Southport London Street, the line and station had been planned, authorised and construction started by the Manchester and Southport Railway before it was acquired by the L&YR on 3 July 1854. The main stone-built station building (no longer in use) was built during this time, in the standard L&YR style which had been described as "solid, substantial, well built of stone in the Elizabethan style, neat without undue ornament".

The station was renamed Gathurst for Shevington around 1934 and then back to Gathurst on 5 May 1975.

The L&YR amalgamated with the London and North Western Railway on 1 January 1922 and in turn was grouped into the London, Midland and Scottish Railway (LMS) in 1923. Nationalisation followed in 1948. When Sectorisation was introduced in the 1980s, the station was served by Regional Railways until the privatisation of British Rail. The goods yard served as an exchange with the ICI Nobels Roburite Works narrow gauge railway.

== Facilities ==
The station is unstaffed and has no ticket machine, so all tickets must be bought prior to travel or on the train. Train running information can be obtained by phone and timetable posters. There is step-free access to both platforms.

== Services ==
On Monday to Saturday, there are two trains an hour westbound to Southport and eastbound to Wigan. Beyond here, services run via Bolton to either Stalybridge via Manchester Victoria or Manchester Oxford Road (services beyond there towards Manchester Piccadilly and points south ended at the winter 2022 timetable change). There are no direct trains via Atherton, except on a Sunday (travellers to these destinations and for stations along the Calder Valley line now need to change at Wigan).

Sunday services are hourly each way and continue to Blackburn eastbound.

Preceding station	National Rail	Following station
Appley Bridge	Northern Trains Manchester–Southport line	Wigan Wallgate

== Bibliography ==
- Grant, Donald J. (2017). Directory of the Railway Companies of Great Britain (1st ed.). Kibworth Beauchamp, Leicestershire: Troubador Publishing Ltd. ISBN 978-1-78803-768-6.
- Marshall, John (1969). The Lancashire & Yorkshire Railway. Vol. 1. Newton Abbot: David & Charles. ISBN 978-0-7153-4352-4.
- Quick, Michael (2023) [2001]. Railway passenger stations in Great Britain: a chronology (PDF). version 5.05. Railway & Canal Historical Society.
