= Wrightington Hospital =

British hospital

- Wrightington, Wigan and Leigh NHS Foundation Trust
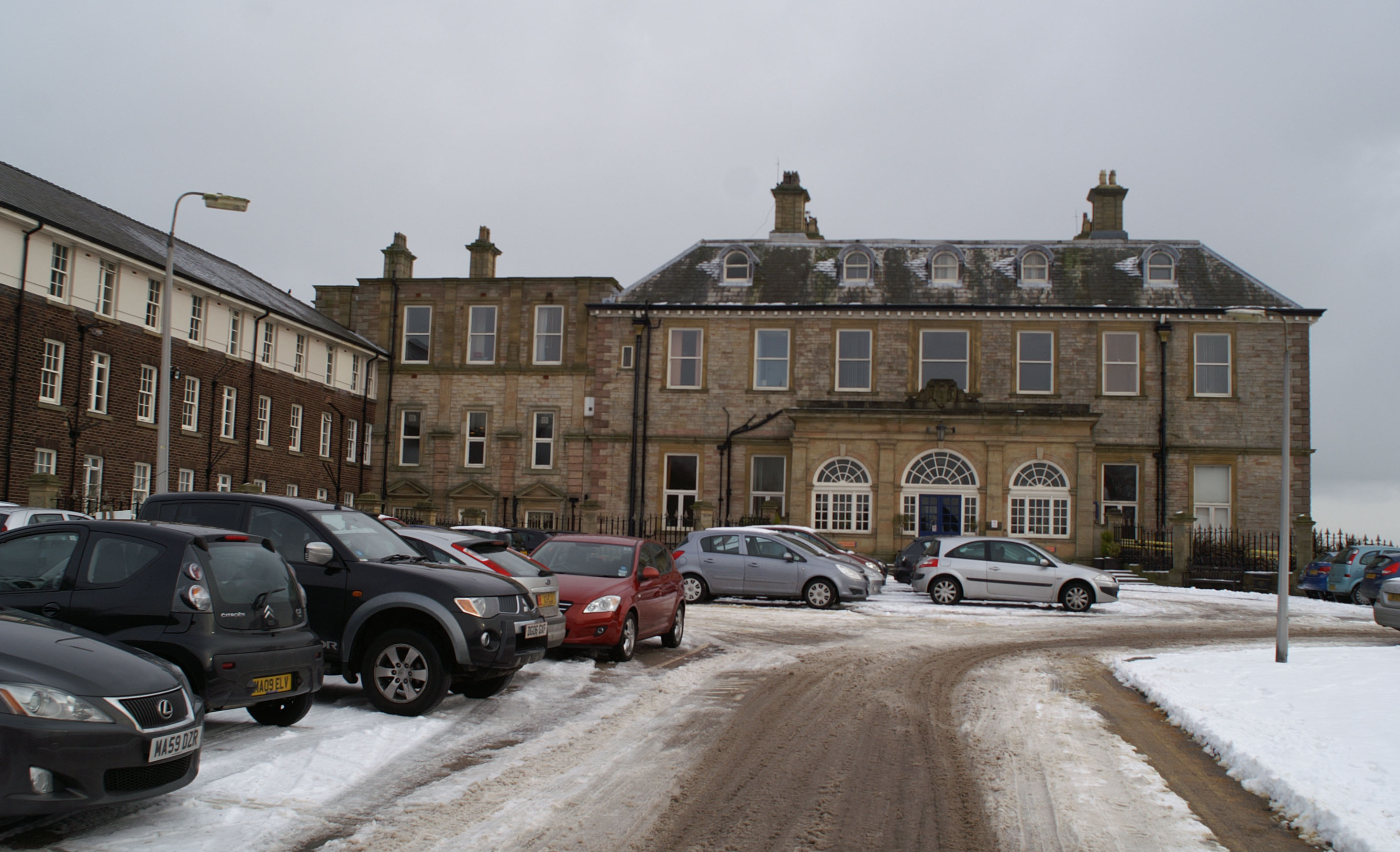
- Wrightington Hospital

- Shown in Lancashire

Geography
- Location: Wrightington, Lancashire, England
- Coordinates: 53.5897°N 2.7115°W

Organisation
- Care system: NHS
- Type: Community hospital

Services
- Emergency department: No

History
- Founded: 1933

Links
- Website: www.wwl.nhs.uk
- Lists: Hospitals in England

Wrightington Hospital is a health facility in Wrightington, Lancashire, England. It is managed by the Wrightington, Wigan and Leigh NHS Foundation Trust.

== History ==
The facility was built as a private house known as Wrightington Hall, which was completed in 1748 and extended in 1860. In 1918 the building was acquired for £16,473 by Lancashire County Council, who converted it, for the cost of £129,520, into a hospital. It officially opened as a facility for the treatment of tuberculosis on 16 June 1933. After the hospital joined the National Health Service in 1948, it specialised in hip and orthopedic surgery and rheumatology. This work was led by Sir John Charnley who was one of the pioneers of the modern hip replacement operation and created the "Wrightington centre for hip surgery."

A new orthopedic centre and theatre complex built for £18 million opened in December 2015. The trust secured planning permission for an additional 33,000 sq ft extension to the hospital in September 2018.
