= Victoria Knowles =

English author and actress

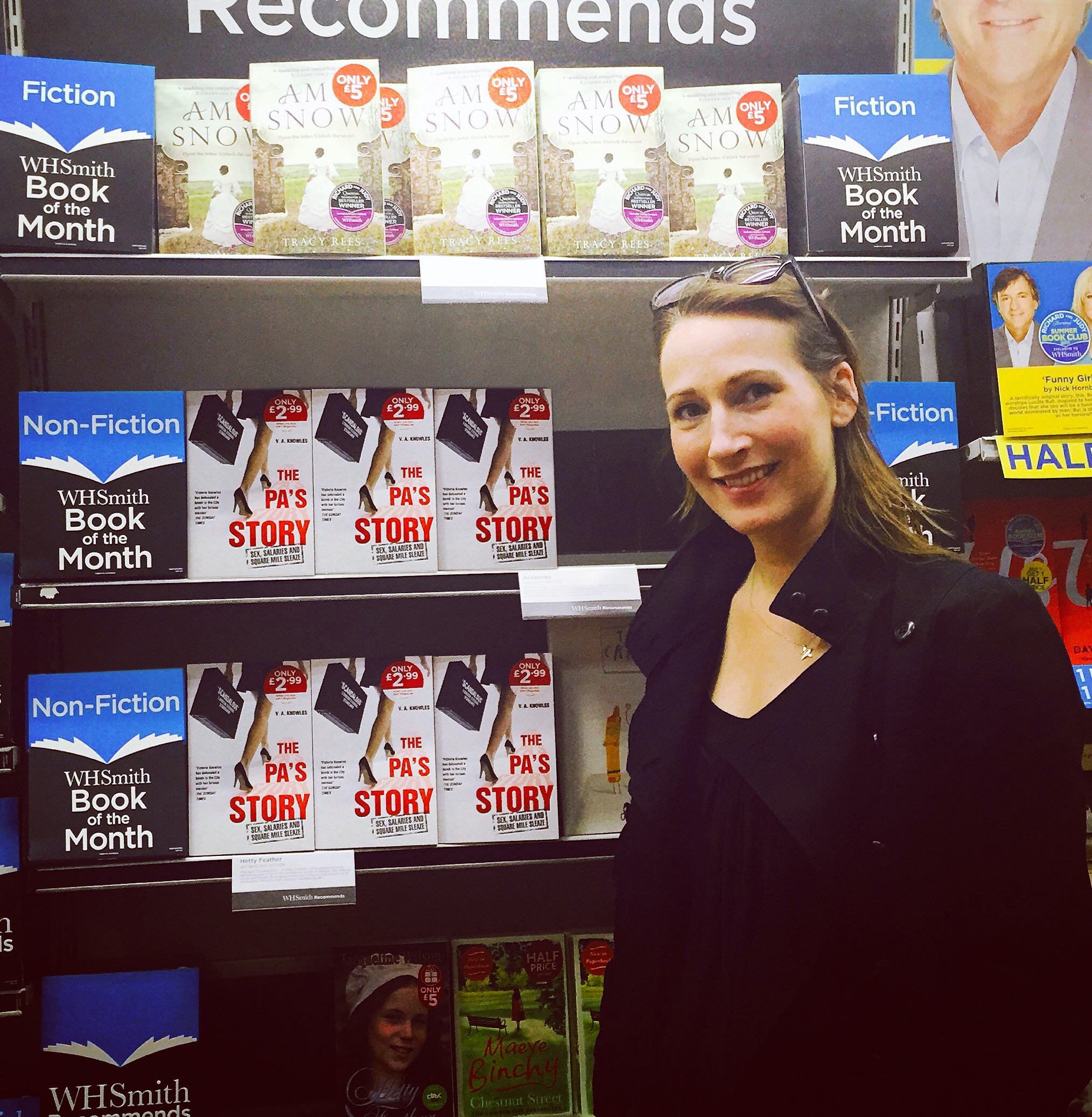
- Knowles attends the WHSmith Oxford Street book signing of The PA's Story
- Born: Victoria Jenkins; 16 April 1976 (age 50); United Kingdom
- Education: Guildford School of Acting
- Occupations: Author, actress, singer, producer and entrepreneur
- Spouse: Edward Knowles (m. 2014)
- Children: 1
- Writing career
- Language: English

Victoria Knowles (née Jenkins; born 16 April 1976) is an English author, actress, singer, producer and entrepreneur.

== Career ==
=== It’s Breast Cancer and Wig Bank London ===
In January 2022, Knowles was diagnosed with triple positive breast cancer. Her treatment consisted of 16 rounds of chemotherapy, surgery and radiotherapy. She didn’t want her diagnosis to be for nothing, so she set about creating a support website called Breast Cancer Chat, and Wig Bank London; a wig recycling service aimed at offering cancer patients wigs at reduced prices.

She also wrote a memoir called ‘It’s Breast Cancer - three little words that change your life’ charting her cancer journey and what she did to improve her prognosis, which was released in late January 2023.

=== The PA and The PA's Story ===
In June 2014, Knowles self-published an e-book titled The PA, an autobiographical account of her time working as a personal assistant to various high profile personalities in the City of London. The PA reached No1 in both the Apple iTunes and Amazon chart for paid books and received widespread media attention.

Subsequent to the success of the ebook, The PA, Knowles was offered a publishing deal to release the book as a paperback with John Blake Publishing, retitled as The PA's Story, it went on sale in the United Kingdom on 4 June 2015.

In July 2019, Knowles completed the screenplay for the film adaptation of The PA. Subsequently, in February 2020, a UK film production company optioned the rights to make the film, which is in the development stage.

=== Friday Night Sucks ===
In 2009, Knowles founded the social networking site, Friday Night Sucks, which was aimed at people that were new to London. The inspiration for the site came when Knowles first moved to London and struggled to make new friends and fill her free time. An alternative to the dating website model, Friday Night Sucks offered new visitors to the capital a more authentic night out.

=== Other activities ===
Knowles, a trained actress and graduate of the Guildford School of Acting in Surrey, has appeared in several British soap operas including Brookside, Hollyoaks and Coronation Street, as well as on stage. In 2008, Knowles co-wrote, starred in and produced the online mockumentary series, Bev Allen, Life Coach, with her partner, Edward Knowles. The show garnered a cult online following, subsequently receiving interest from production companies and networks with a view to develop it for television.

Knowles released her debut EP, This is Rees, under the name of Rees in 2012 and has appeared as a lead vocalist with the band Real Experts.

== Personal life ==
Knowles lives in Greenwich, London, with her husband, son and cat.
