= Bispham Green =

Village in Lancashire, England

Coordinates: 53.615°N 2.773°W

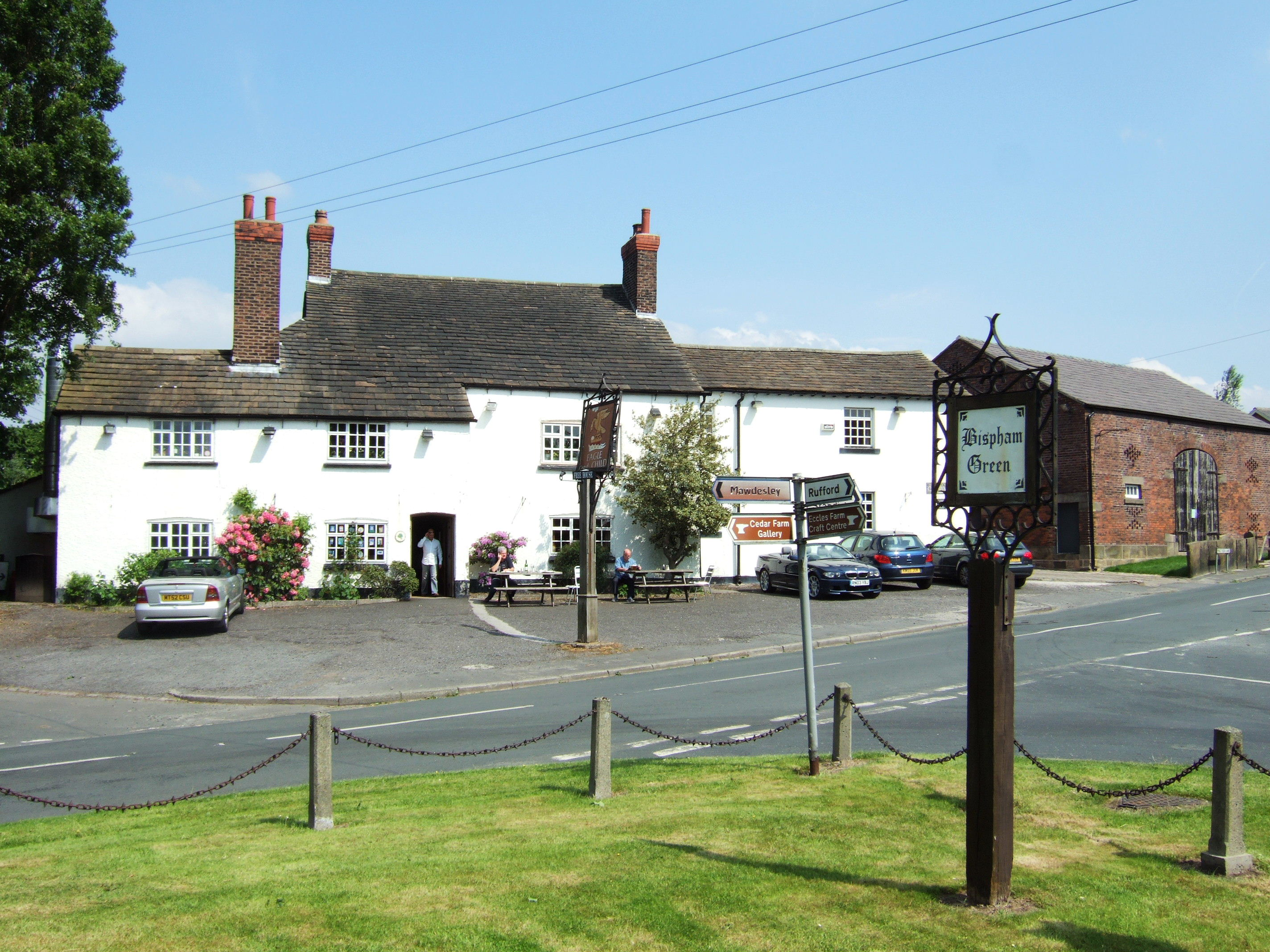
- The Eagle and Child public house

- Location in West Lancashire Location within Lancashire
- Population: 238 (civil parish, 2011)
- OS grid reference: SD488134
- Civil parish: Bispham
- District: West Lancashire
- Shire county: Lancashire
- Region: North West
- Country: England
- Sovereign state: United Kingdom
- Post town: ORMSKIRK
- Postcode district: L40
- Dialling code: 01257
- Police: Lancashire
- Fire: Lancashire
- Ambulance: North West
- UK Parliament: West Lancashire

Bispham Green is a village in the West Lancashire district of Lancashire, England. It is 1 mile (1.6 km) south of Mawdesley and less than 1 mile (1.6 km) north of Parbold.

The civil parish of Bispham is the only one in the West Lancashire district that is served by a parish meeting instead of a town or parish council. At the 2011 census the parish had a population of 238. The surrounding areas was once popular for osier (willow growing) for the basket weaving trade, but since the 1950s the land has reverted solely to agricultural use. There are no industrial buildings and no future planning for any extensive development.

== Geography ==
Bispham is south of Croston, Mawdesley and Tarleton, north of Hilldale and Parbold, west of Heskin, Wrightington and Eccleston. The River Douglas travels through Bispham and it is a tributary to the River Ribble and has two tributaries itself, the River Tawd and the River Yarrow. It shares its local parish with Mawdesley as Bispham has no actual churches on its land. The land around Bispham is both pastoral and arable and abundant with wildlife. Bispham covers an area of approximately 1,000 acres (4.0 km^{2}) of grade 2 agricultural land. Rising to 80 metres above sea level at its eastern tip, it is bounded on the south side of the River Douglas, and on the north side of Bentley Brook.

== Richard Durning's Endowed Primary School ==
Richard Durning's Endowed Primary School was known as Bispham Free Grammar School up until 1951. The name was changed to Richard Durning's because Richard Durning himself had funded the building of the school in his will after he died in 1692. He had set aside £100 for the school and the land (known as Higher Jacks field) was purchased for £10. He also left money of which "a yearly sum of £4 is to be paid to four or six poor people of Bispham such as by age, sickness, lameness, or any other infirmity should have need, (bastards always excepted) £2 for repairing the high lanes of Bispham Green and Grimshaw Green and the house of Peter Travis, and the high lanes of Wrightington, £5 for the binding of poor children apprentices in the townships of Bispham, Parbold, Mawdesley and Wrightington, £5 to be paid and distributed among two or more of my poor kindred, £2 towards the support of a preaching minister at Douglas Chapel." Today the Trustees of the Charity administer its assets, the income from which is used to provide special benefits to the school and to award grants towards the cost of the education and training of young people under the age of 25 who are pupils or former pupils of the school or who reside in the civil parishes of Bispham, Parbold, Mawdesley, Wrightington and Croston. Part of the school building dates back to 1693. It is located on Chorley Road, in Bispham. Richard Durning was a local yeoman, who was born in 1615 and died in 1692 at the age of 75. He is buried in the Chancel of St Michael an All Angels Parish Church in Croston.

== See also ==
- Listed buildings in Bispham, West Lancashire
