= St James the Great Church, Wrightington =

Coordinates: 53.6169°N 2.7175°W

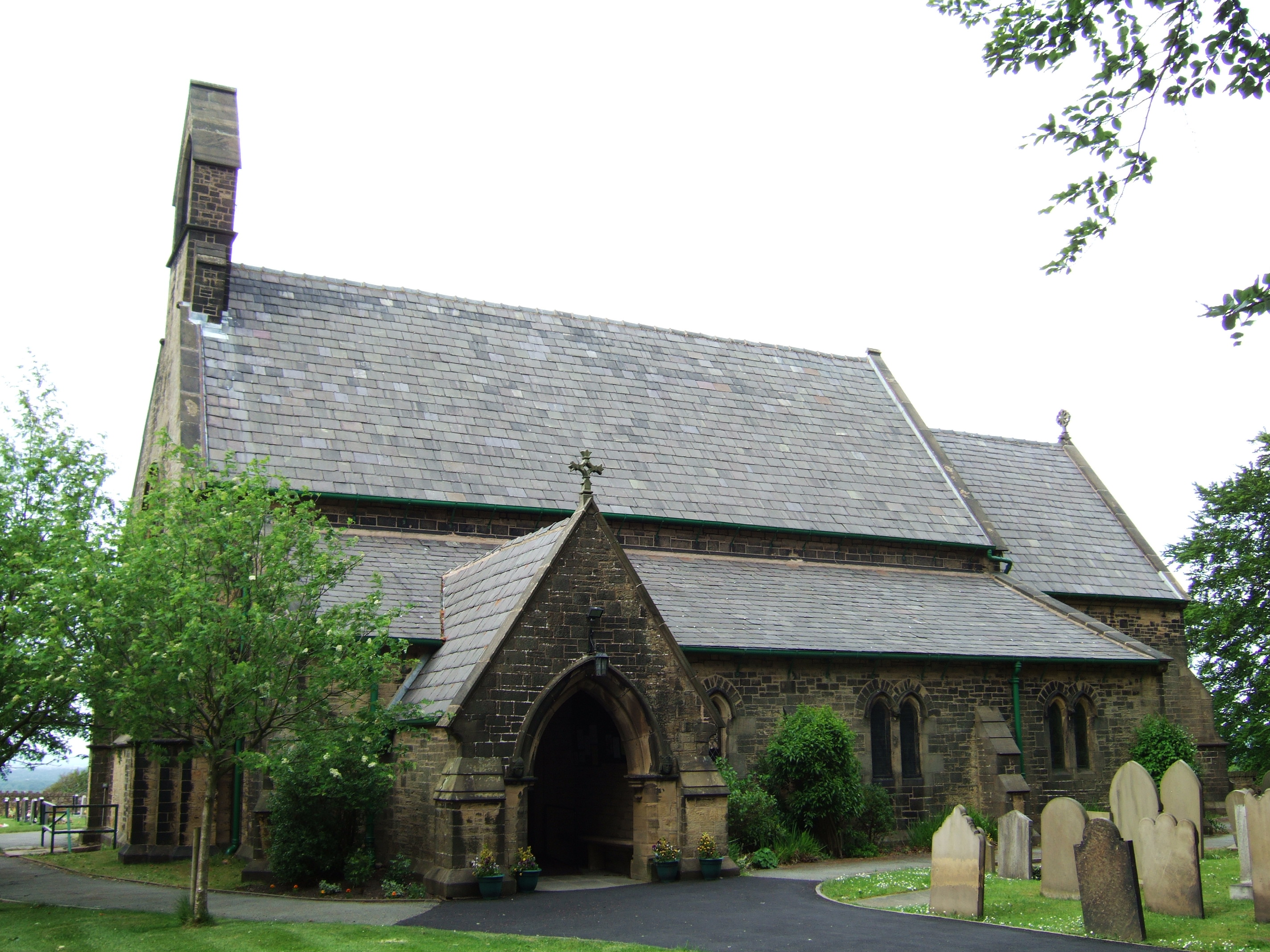
- St James the Great Church, Wrightington, from the south

- Location in the Borough of West Lancashire
- OS grid reference: SD 526,136
- Location: Wrightington, Lancashire
- Country: England
- Denomination: Anglican
- Website: St James the Great

History
- Status: Parish church
- Dedication: Saint James
- Consecrated: 1857

Architecture
- Functional status: Active
- Heritage designation: Grade II
- Designated: 19 August 1988
- Architect: E. G. Paley
- Architectural type: Church
- Style: Gothic Revival
- Completed: 1857

Specifications
- Materials: Sandstone rubble, slate roof

Administration
- Province: York
- Diocese: Blackburn
- Archdeaconry: Blackburn
- Deanery: Chorley
- Parish: Wrightington

Clergy
- Vicar: Revd Polly Mason

St James the Great Church is in Church Lane, to the west of Wrightington in Lancashire, England. It is an active Anglican parish church in the deanery of Chorley, the archdeaconry of Blackburn, and the diocese of Blackburn. The church is recorded in the National Heritage List for England as a designated Grade II listed building.

The Church's community also runs a theatre group, known as 'The St James Players', for people of all age to participate in, and performs an annual play or pantomime in the theatre building directly across from the Church itself.

== History ==
The church was designed by the Lancaster architect E. G. Paley. It was built in 1854, but not consecrated until 1857. As originally built, it provided seating for 400 people.

== Architecture ==
=== Exterior ===
St James' is constructed in sandstone rubble and has a slate roof. Its plan consists of a four-bay nave with a south aisle, a south porch, and a chancel. At the west end is a rose window, above which is a gabled bellcote. Along the north wall of the nave are four pairs of lancet windows, between which are buttresses, and along the south wall of the aisle are three similar windows. The chancel has two lancets in the south wall, and a triple stepped lancet window at the east end.

=== Interior ===
Inside the church is an arcade carried on alternate round and octagonal piers. The church has an open timber roof. The two-manual organ was made in 1916 by Jardine of Manchester and modified in about 1985 by Pendlebury of Cleveleys. The authors of the Buildings of England series express the opinion that the church is "nothing special".

== External features ==
The churchyard contains the war graves of a soldier and an airman of World War II.

== See also ==
- Listed buildings in Wrightington
- List of ecclesiastical works by E. G. Paley
