= Appley Bridge =

Village in Lancashire, England

Coordinates: 53.5790°N 2.7210°W

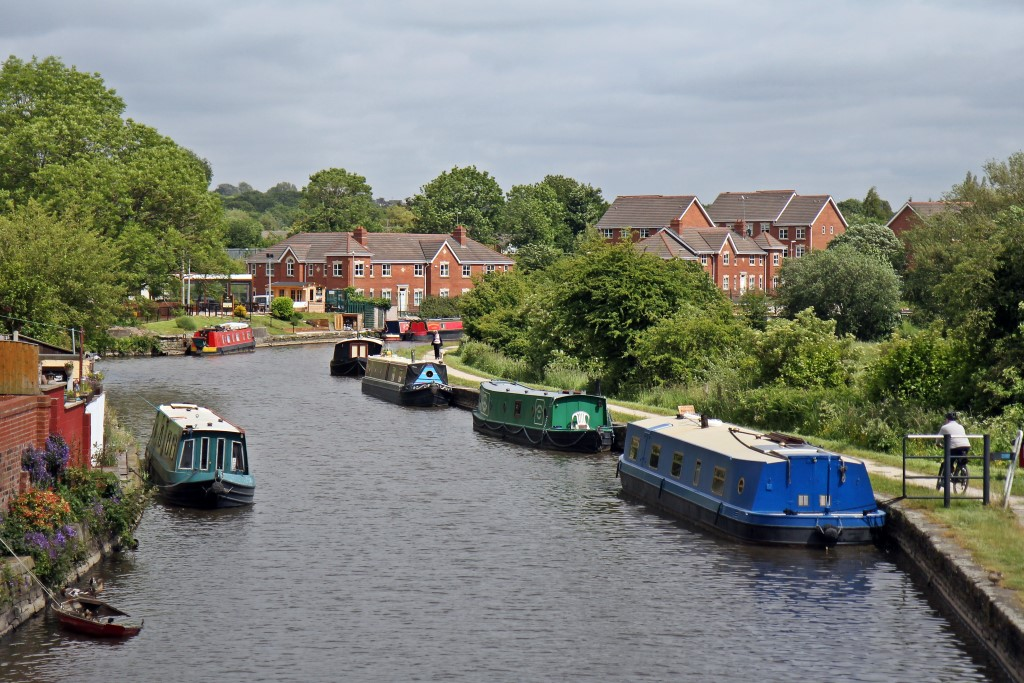
- The Leeds and Liverpool Canal

- Location in West Lancashire Location within Lancashire
- Population: 18,500 (2001 Census)
- OS grid reference: SD531096
- Civil parish: Wrightington
- District: West Lancashire
- Shire county: Lancashire
- Region: North West
- Country: England
- Sovereign state: United Kingdom
- Post town: WIGAN
- Postcode district: WN6
- Dialling code: 01257
- Police: Lancashire
- Fire: Lancashire
- Ambulance: North West
- UK Parliament: West Lancashire

Appley Bridge is a village in West Lancashire, England. It straddles the borders of Greater Manchester and Lancashire, England. It is located off Junction 27 of the M6 motorway and is nestled in the Douglas Valley alongside the Leeds and Liverpool Canal.

== Toponymy ==
Appley comes from Apple lea (on the River Douglas), from (boscus de "Woodland") Appelae, Appeleie, or Appeleye, found in 13th-century Chartulary of Cockersand Abbey; also "Appley Moor"; within the township of Wrightington in the ancient parish of Eccleston.

== Community ==
Appley Bridge was a thriving industrial village with a paint and linoleum works, several quarries, and clay pits for the Wigan brick company, today the village still has several factories including a weighbridge manufacturer and a caravan factory.

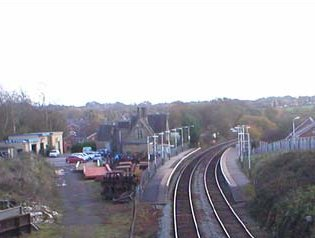
Appley Bridge railway station

Appley Bridge has two churches, (Methodist and Church of England), and is in the Deanery of Chorley, Diocese of Blackburn.

Most of the children residing in Appley Bridge attend All Saints primary school, Shevington Vale primary school and Shevington high school.

Appley Bridge railway station, opened in 1855 by the Lancashire & Yorkshire Railway, is situated on the Southport to Manchester line. The village contains a few convenience shops, a football field, multiple children's playing areas, several country pubs and a post office. Appley Bridge converges into the village of Shevington Vale which is within the Greater Manchester border.

== Recreation ==
There are many open spaces in Appley Bridge where the local population play football, cricket and rugby etc. The organised football team is called Appley Bridge F.C. And plays matches on the football pitch on Appley Lane South facing the old local pub, The Bridge Inn, near the Leeds and Liverpool Canal. Appley Bridge F.C. which is a Football Association Charter club has many junior teams from the under age 8 up to the under age 16. This is complemented by senior teams and a successful over-35s team. The Senior team enjoys good support and the junior teams have at various age groups been very successful over the past seasons.

19th Wigan Boys' Brigade and 1st Appley Bridge Girls' Brigade meet regularly at Vale Methodist Church Hall.

Appley Bridge Golf Club (now defunct) was founded in 1907. The club had disappeared by the early 1950s. The local golf club is now Gathurst Golf Club, which is approximately 2 miles from Appley Bridge.

== Skull House ==
In between Appley Lane North and Miles Lane is a road called Skull House Lane. The lane takes its name from a cottage known as Skull House, which is located about halfway down Appley Lane North, and the cottage in turn takes its name from a discoloured human skull on the living room mantelpiece of the house.

Some inhabitants of Appley Bridge claim that throughout the history of the house, many residents have tried to get rid of the skull, and all have experienced disastrous results after doing so. Recent tests indicate that the skull is female.

== Appley Bridge meteorite ==
At around 8.45pm on Tuesday evening of 13 October 1914, the inhabitants of Appley Bridge (indeed Lancashire and Cheshire too) were treated to a sudden and spectacular illumination of the night sky, caused by a meteorite that was found in a farmer's field in the village the following day. Found just 18 inches below the surface of the field, with the appearance of burnt iron, the small rock weighed almost 33 lb (15 kg). An article in the "Scientific News" (No. 2588, 30 October 1914) stated, "a small fragment which had been detached from the larger mass was put on view in a shop-window at Appley Bridge." In September 2014 a book about the meteorite, by local author Russell Parry, was published ( ISBN 0954953126 ).

== Millbank flood 1987 ==
Floodwater in the street; the water has not yet reached its highest level

Syd Hill comes to the rescue with a small personally owned motor launch – the top of a car is visible on the drive, giving a clear indication of water depth

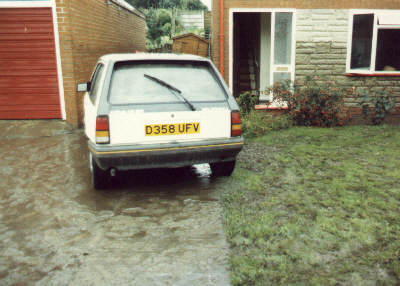
After the flood – the waterline is clearly visible on the side of the house

On 22 August 1987, parts of Appley Bridge were affected by severe flooding – worst affected was the Millbank estate, off Mill Lane.

During heavy rain, the entrance to the culvert that carries Calico Brook beneath the estate became blocked by debris (leaves, branches etc.) and overtopped into the estate, causing extensive flooding to most of the properties. Most residents spent the next few months – up to December 1987 – in caravans parked on their front gardens, whilst repairs were carried out. The properties required extensive repair: re-plastering, new woodwork (doors, window frames etc.), with only the higher houses at the entrance to the estate being unaffected.

Here are quotes from a West Lancs District Council (WLDC) information item and a press release, dated 11 September 1987:

"When severe flooding occurred in several parts of the district on Saturday 22nd August 1987 - Parbold and parts of Skelmersdale were badly affected, whilst the Millbank estate in Appley Bridge was flooded out, with several houses being filled by water to first floor level and almost all of the remainder having water in their ground floor, varying from about two feet to five or six feet in depth. An amateur meteorologist with a weather station at Hilldale recorded the fall of 3.8 inches (97 mm) of rain during the 48 hours beginning at 8.00am on Saturday, 22nd August: over two thirds of that rainfall - about 2.6 inches - being in a four hour period on Saturday afternoon..."

"...From preliminary information, it would appear that the storm frequency was in the order of 1 in 75 year occurrence and this led to widespread flooding throughout the region..."

From information item presented to a meeting of the WLDC Technical Services Committee:

"...The most severe flooding incident was at Millbank Estate, Appley Bridge, where a 60" diameter piped culvert running through the estate could not cope with the sudden flow of surface water in the Calico brook. The brook overflowed the culvert and flooded the estate, which lies in a hollow, to a depth of about 8 feet (2.4 m). at the lower end, approximately 40 houses being involved. The Fire Brigade were called to give assistance and they and the Police helped to evacuate the residents. The North West Water Authority Rivers Division also provided assistance with workmen and pumping equipment to pump the water away. The estate was not cleared of water until about Saturday midnight..."

Soon after the flood, the council undertook simple remedial works to reduce the risk of further flooding. They were considered to be temporary works, with a permanent solution to follow. The works that were carried out consisted of the building of a restriction to flow, as part of a bridge across the stream in the local woods (known as "the slacks"), they also cut a "notch" into the quarry side wall. In the event of heavy rain, the stream will back-up against the restriction in the bridge and overflow through the notch into the nearby quarry. A wider spaced grill was also placed at the entrance to the culvert allowing small items, such as leaves, to pass through the culvert without blocking it.

In March 2012, twenty-four years after the flooding, work was finally started to replace the 1988 "temporary" works with a permanent project called the "Calico Brook Flood Risk Management Scheme". This scheme of work has been completed, and consists of a concrete structure linked into an emergency overflow pipe. Normally, water passes through the structure and continues on to the brooks normal course, but in times of high discharge, the brook spills over into the emergency pipeline, which channels the water through a low-friction pipe directly to the River Douglas lower down the valley.

== Notable people ==
- Joe Edelston (1891–1970), footballer who played 184 games also a manager for Reading
- Theodore Major (1908–1999), artist and a great individualist of British Art, had a local studio
- Jo Moran (1930–2021), ornithologist, wildlife photographer, mountaineer and climber
- Eva Pope (born 1967), an English actress, played headmistress Rachel Mason in Waterloo Road
- Andy Saunders (born ca.1970), a film restorer who specialises in historical NASA imagery.
- Darren Almond (born 1971), an English artist, who works in a variety of media including photography and film
- Victoria Knowles (born 1976), author, actress, singer, producer and entrepreneur.
- Andy Fisher (born 1998), footballer who has played over 130 games

== See also ==
- Listed buildings in Wrightington
