= Wrightington =

Civil parish in Lancashire, England

Coordinates: 53.608°N 2.701°W

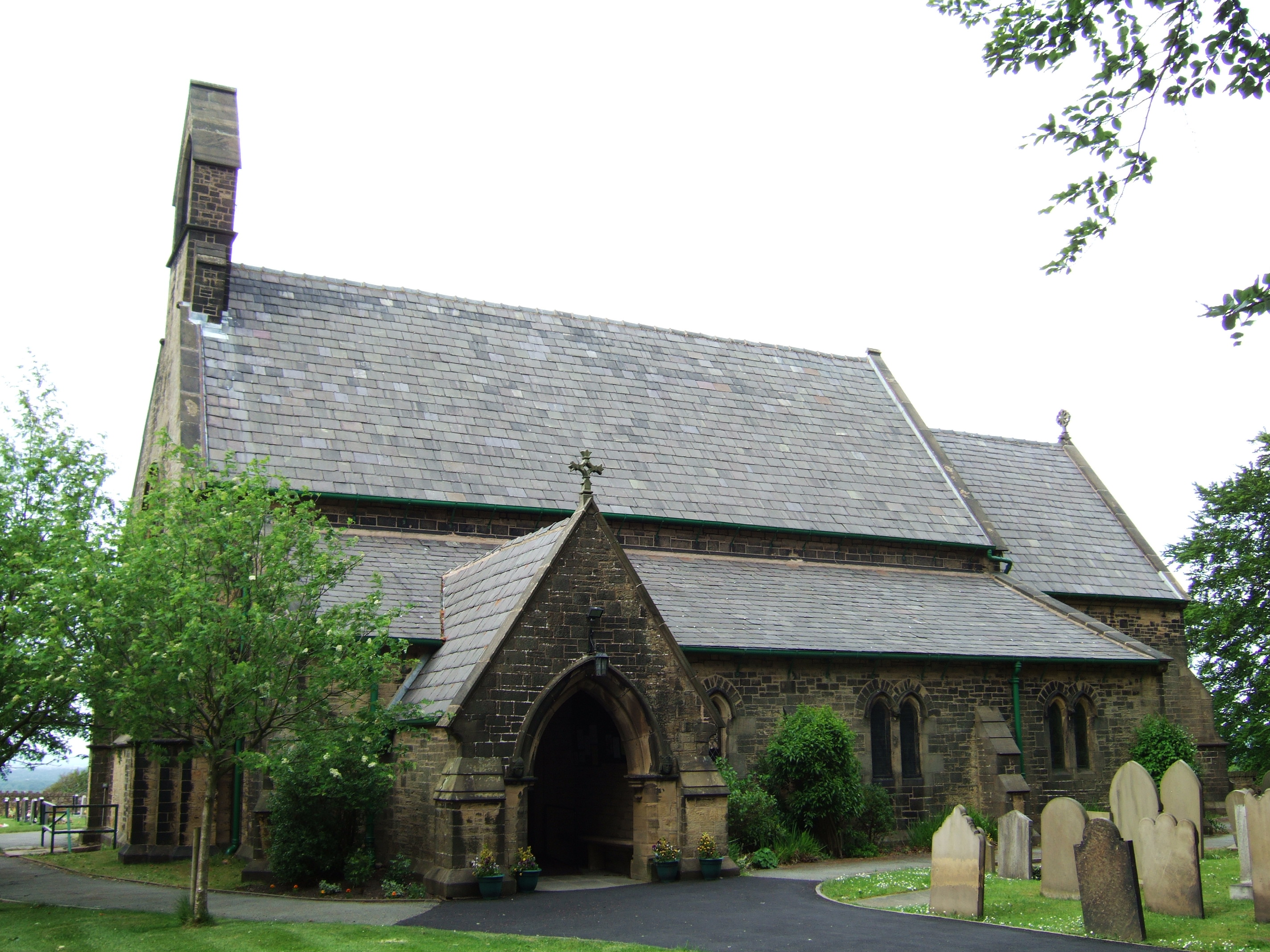
- St James the Great Church

- Location in West Lancashire Location within Lancashire
- Population: 2,886 (2011 census)
- OS grid reference: SD536126
- Civil parish: Wrightington
- District: West Lancashire
- Shire county: Lancashire
- Region: North West
- Country: England
- Sovereign state: United Kingdom
- Post town: WIGAN
- Postcode district: WN6
- Dialling code: 01257
- Police: Lancashire
- Fire: Lancashire
- Ambulance: North West
- UK Parliament: West Lancashire

Wrightington is a civil parish in West Lancashire, England, with an area of 3,915½ acres. The surface is hilly, rising to over 400 ft. at Harrock on the border of Parbold, and then falling to the north, northeast and southeast. On the southern border, the boundary at Appley Bridge touches the River Douglas. Wrightington Hall is to the north of this point. Tunley and Broadhurst lie to the north of the park, and Fairhurst, to the west of Harrock, reaches down to the River Douglas. At the 2011 census, Wrightington had a population of 2,886.

== History ==
Boar's Den Tumulus

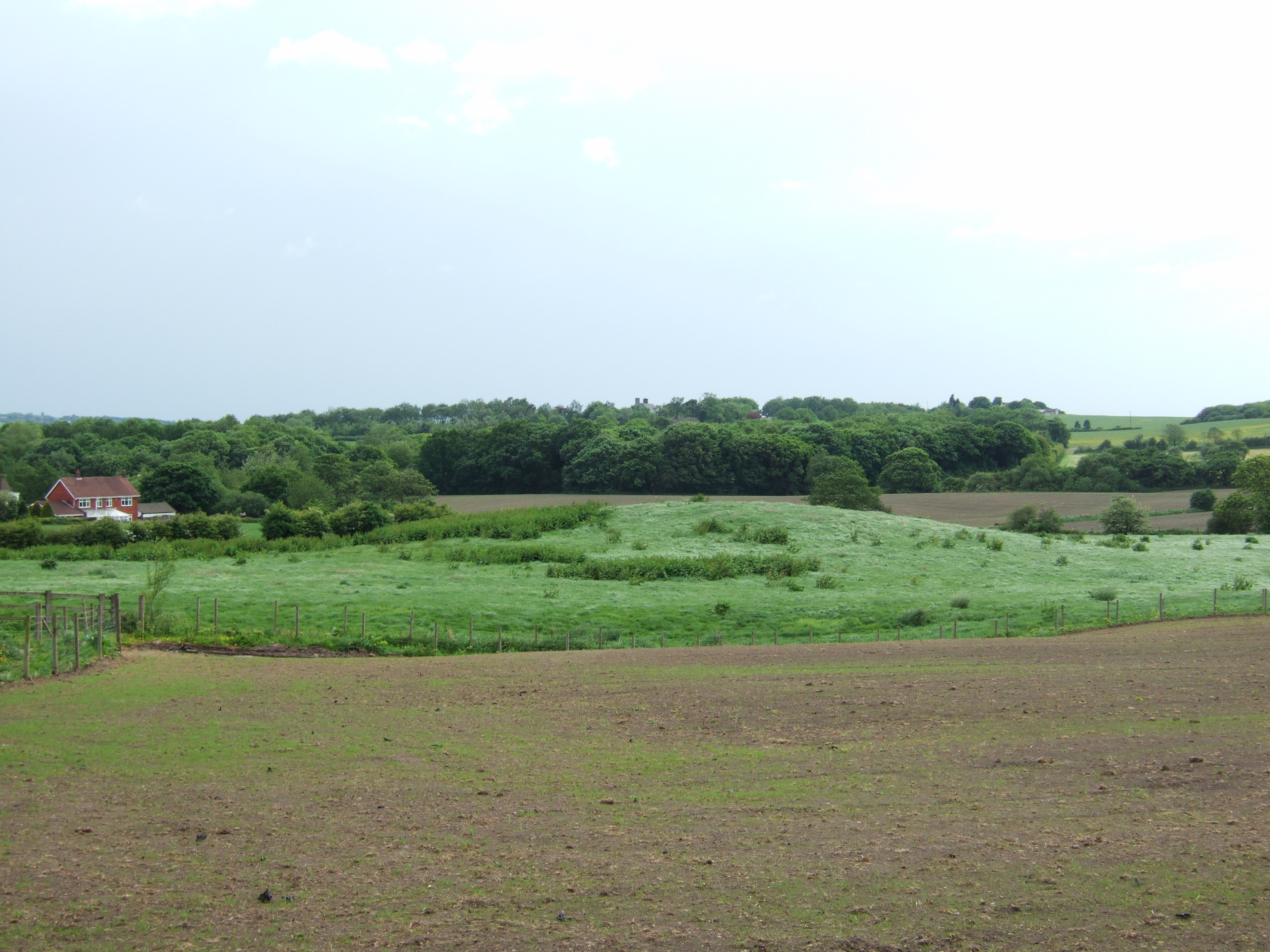
Boar's Den Tumulus at High Moor

Boar's Den, thought to be a Bronze Age round barrow, is relatively undisturbed and consists of an earth and stone mound 73 yards (67 m) (E/W) by 68 yards (62 m) (N/S) with a maximum height of 8 feet (2.4 m) that suffered some plough damage in the past and is now used only as grazing land. If this round barrow were not marked on a map, despite being fairly extensive, it might be missed on the ground, mistaken as a natural lump in the middle of the field.

In 1691, the first church in Wrightington was built. The curate, Jonathan Scholefield, ejected from Douglas Chapel, Parbold, in 1662 for his Puritan beliefs, found refuge at Tunley, where a group of Presbyterians started meeting regularly for worship at South Tunley Hall, the home of Thomas and Elizabeth Wilson. Twenty-two years after his death in 1667, the passing of the Toleration Act 1688 allowed dissenters to worship openly. For the free exercise of their Divine worship, Thomas Wilson of "Tunley within Wrightington " erected a chapel for Protestants dissenting from the Church of England. About a century later the congregation became Unitarian before the building was given to the Scottish Presbyterians. It now belongs to the Presbyterian Church of England. The original church building is believed to be the oldest building in England that was built as a Presbyterian church.

St. James the Great was built in 1857 by E. G. Paley for the services of the Church of England. In November 2000, to commemorate the millennium, a new stained glass window was added combining traditional imagery and contemporary elements. The church is set in lovely countryside, commanding views stretching from Southport to the Lake District. The central theme, the Nativity of Jesus, is surrounded by finely drawn landscapes and well known buildings from the surrounding area: the famous Wrightington Hospital, the church and the 400-year-old Heskin School.

Founded before 1893, the Carr House Lane Primitive Methodist Church was an early 19th century (1807) secession from the Wesleyan Methodist church. It was particularly successful in evangelising agricultural and industrial communities at open meetings. In 1932, the Primitive Methodists joined with the Wesleyan Methodists and the United Methodists to form the Methodist Church of Great Britain. The chapel is now closed.

Fairhurst Hall was at one time a place of worship for Roman Catholicism and a priest had been maintained at Wrightington Hall from the 1680s and a private chapel dedicated to St. Joseph was provided for the family, tenantry and employees until the building of St. Joseph's in 1892 by Charles Clifton Dicconson.

== Parish council ==
Wrightington has a parish council which consists of two wards, Mossy Lea and Appley Bridge each represented by three councillors. Hilldale, formerly a ward of Wrightington, became a separate civil parish in 1999.

== Wrightington Hall ==
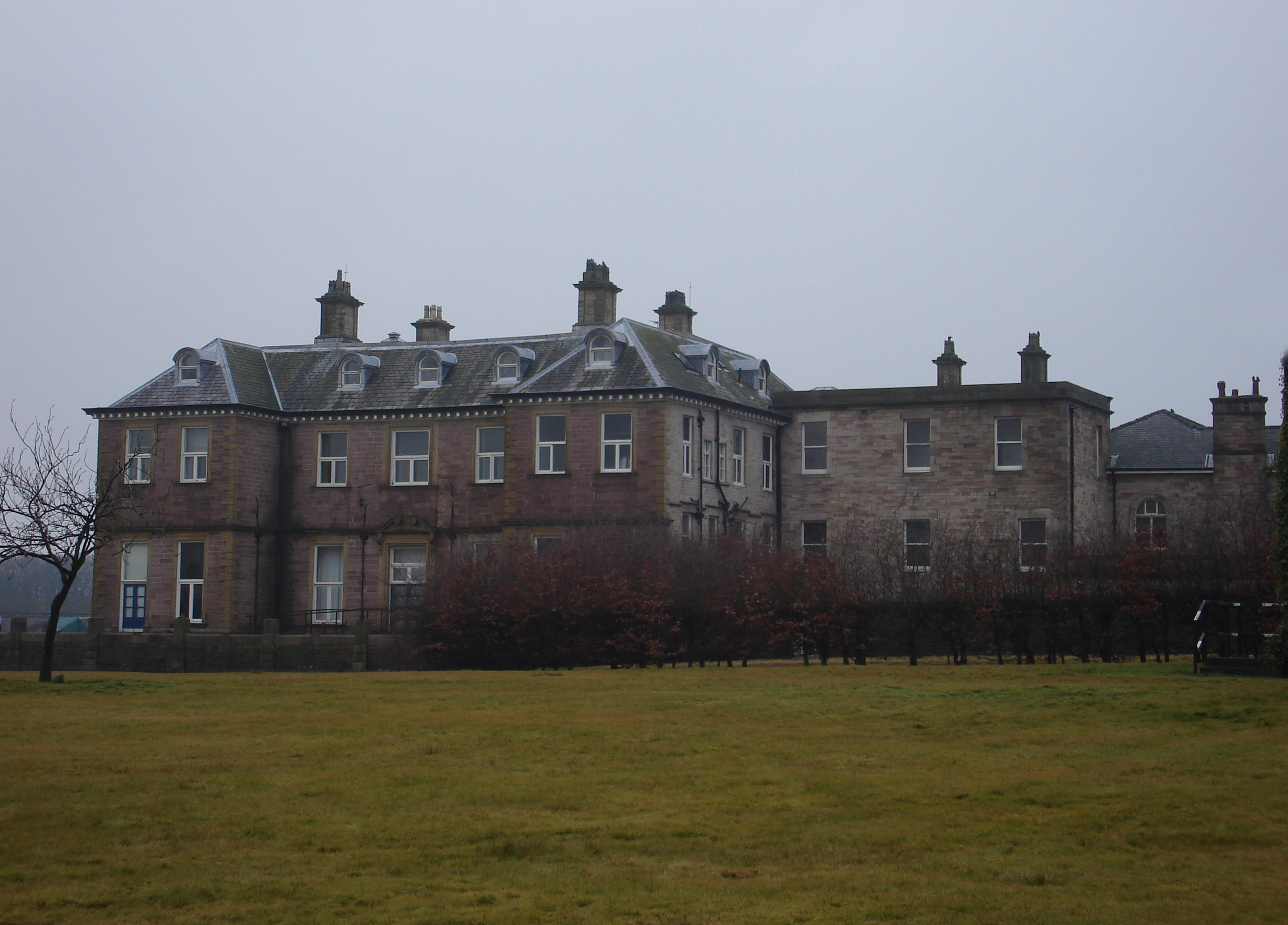
Wrightington Hall

For several centuries, Wrightington Hall was the home of the Wrightington family, who are said to have been descended from Fitz Orm, the son of Orm, a powerful noble in this part of Lancashire in the 12th century, credited with the founding of the Church of St Peter and St Paul, Ormskirk's parish church.

When Sir Edward Wrightington died in 1658, his heir, Hugh Dicconson, erected a very fine tomb for Sir Edward in St Wilfred's Parish Church, Standish.

Two of Hugh Dicconson's sons, William and Roger, became Roman Catholics and were implicated in a plot to overthrow the government of the day under William III and Mary II and bring back the exiled King James II.

William, along with several other Catholic Lancastrians, was put on trial in Manchester for treason in 1694. They were acquitted for lack of sufficient evidence to convict them. However, immediately afterwards, William fled to France to join James II in exile, where he was appointed "governor" (tutor) to Bonnie Prince Charlie, and his wife became "Maid of Honour" to the exiled Queen, Mary of Modena.

William's brother, Roger, was living at Wrightington Hall and supported the Old Pretender in the abortive 1715 rebellion. Surprisingly, the estate did not suffer for his part in it.

The ancient hall was then a typical Tudor manor house no longer survives: the present structure was constructed in 1748 and extended in 1860.

In 1918 the hall was acquired by Lancashire County Council who converted it into a health facility now known as Wrightington Hospital.

== Peter Lathom's charity ==
Peter Lathom of Bispham was a great-grandson of Richard Lathom of Allerton Hall (1563-1602) Lancashire, England- whose family's lands and hereditaments were confiscated for treason in 1652 (fn. 20) and ordered to be sold by Parliament. His family now poor, Peter took to the roads and became a beggar, relying on the goodwill of the surrounding villagers for occasional jobs, food and shelter. In his will (1700), he left money for the children of these villages, including Wrightington:

Peter Lathom's life (1651–1701) was cast in very stormy times. He grew up during some of the most disturbed periods of English history. He saw the confiscation of the Parbold. Wrightington and Allerton estates; he witnessed the extremes of poverty into which this Confiscation had thrown the Lathom family; he saw some of them with not the value of 5/- (25p) either in goods or lands, and constantly harried by religious and civil strife; and seeing all these things it is hardly surprising that he leaves money for the benefit of the poor – among whom the Lathoms of Parbold were now to be numbered; that he remembers the St. John Roman Catholic Mission in which Christopher Lathom, the priest and a possible relative, is interested; that he bequeaths £40 to the children of another possible relative, Mistress Katherine Lethem; that he forbids any public officer to be employed in the distribution of his charity- an understandable family dislike of the officialdom which had oppressed the Lathoms of Parbold- and that he does not forget even the poor prisoners in Lancaster Castle, in which again he may have had some family interest.

From his will, which he signed in his own handwriting and other legal sources we learn that he called himself Peter Lathom, yeoman, of Bispham; that the Will was dated 2 April 1700, with a codicil dated 19 February 1701; that the "Testator departed this life October, 1701," and finally that the will was proved in the Consistory Court of Chester on 11 February 1702.

An English paper says: — "The trustees of the charity of Peter Lathom, once a beggar, of Mawdesley, near Preston, have just met. It was reported that the property, which originally cost a few hundreds, was now worth £570,000 - One block had recently been sold for £87,000, the fabulous advance in value being owing to the discovery of coal on the land. Lathom left the land for the benefit of the thirteen townships through which he begged, to keep and apprentice four lads, to further education, and other philanthropic uses."

Today, the key objectives of the charity are to provide financial assistance for the education and training of persons under the ages of 25 years.

== Amenities ==
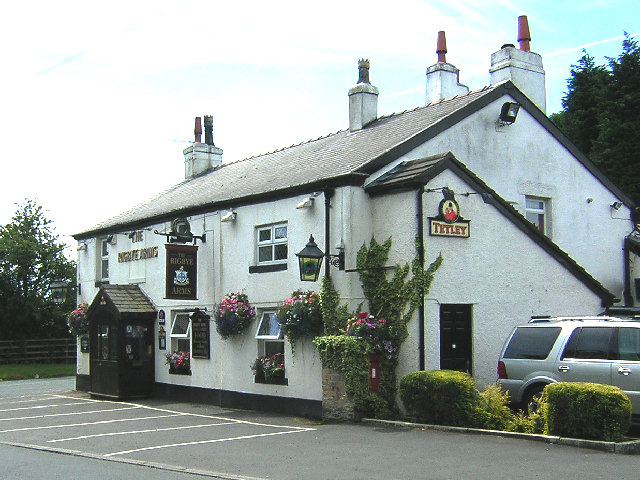
Rigbye Arms at High Moor

There are five churches in Wrightington Parish. Wrightington has two primary schools, Mossy Lea Primary School and St. Joseph's Catholic Primary School, a hairdresser and two service stations. There are three pubs along the main road through the centre of the village and country pubs and restaurants in the outlying part of the village.

== Agriculture and industry ==
Wrightington is a rural community of farms and equestrian establishments. Dairy, sheep and fish farming together with stables contribute to the agricultural economy.

Established in the village in 1976, Ainscough Crane Hire has since grown through expansion and acquisition to become the UK's largest crane hire operator.

== Community ==
The parish council, working in partnership with Lancashire College, now offers Mossy Lea Village Hall as a learning facility with computer courses, family learning courses, tai chi and yoga classes. There is also a village hall at Appley Bridge.

== Recreation and sport ==
There are two bowling greens.

Sports facilities at the Wrightington Country Club include: a state of the art gymnasium, an eighteen-metre (59.1 ft) swimming pool, an aromatic fibre lit steam room, toning tables, a solarium, a jacuzzi, a dance studio and squash courts.

== Notable people ==
- Sir James Pemberton (1550–1613), an English goldsmith who was Lord Mayor of London in 1611.
- Edward Dicconson (1670–1752), Roman Catholic bishop - Vicar Apostolic of the Northern District of England from 1740 to 1752.

== See also ==
- Listed buildings in Wrightington
- Scheduled monuments in Lancashire
