= Grade II* listed buildings in Daventry District =

There are over 20,000 Grade II* listed buildings in England. This page is a list of these buildings in the former district of Daventry in Northamptonshire, now part of the unitary authority area of West Northamptonshire.

== List of buildings ==
Name	Location	Type	Completed (Note: The date given is the date used by Historic England as significant for the initial building or that of an important part in the structure's description.)	Date designated	Grid ref. (Note: The grid reference is based on the British national grid reference system, sometimes known as OSGB36, used by the Ordnance Survey.) Geo-coordinates	Entry number (Note: The "List Entry Number" is a unique number assigned to each listed building and scheduled monument by Historic England.)	Image
Althorp, Gardeners House	Althorp	Estate cottage	Mid-18th century	2 November 1954	SP6820564502; 52°16′28″N 1°00′06″W	1356630	Upload Photo
Althorp, Stables	Althorp	Stables	c.1730	2 November 1954	SP6813165040; 52°16′45″N 1°00′10″W	1054034	Althorp, Stables More images
Church of St Andrew	Arthingworth	Church	12th century	2 November 1954	SP7547381421; 52°25′32″N 0°53′29″W	1067030	Church of St Andrew More images
Manor House	Ashby St. Ledgers	House	16th century	18 September 1953	SP5733668289; 52°18′35″N 1°09′38″W	1367130	Manor House More images
Timber-framed house attached to north side of Manor House	Ashby St. Ledgers	House	1903	18 January 1968	SP5733368308; 52°18′36″N 1°09′38″W	1342976	Upload Photo
Church of St Mary the Virgin	Badby	Church	14th century	18 January 1968	SP5597058737; 52°13′26″N 1°10′55″W	1075276	Church of St Mary the Virgin More images
Church of St Mary	Barby	Church	13th century	18 January 1968	SP5433270295; 52°19′41″N 1°12′15″W	1076479	Church of St Mary More images
Church of St Peter and St Paul	Brockhall	Church	13th century	18 January 1968	SP6328062684; 52°15′31″N 1°04′28″W	1075243	Church of St Peter and St Paul More images
Manor Farmhouse	Brockhall	Farmhouse	1677	18 September 1953	SP6339462685; 52°15′31″N 1°04′22″W	1075246	Manor Farmhouse
The Hall	Brockhall	Country house	Early 17th century	18 January 1968	SP6326262662; 52°15′31″N 1°04′28″W	1075245	The Hall More images
Manor House	Byfield	Manor house	Early 18th century	18 January 1968	SP5175853425; 52°10′36″N 1°14′40″W	1075339	Manor House More images
Canons Ashby House, gates and gatepiers to Green Court	Canons Ashby	Gate	Early 18th century	18 January 1968	SP5767050691; 52°09′05″N 1°09′31″W	1367449	Canons Ashby House, gates and gatepiers to Green Court More images
Canons Ashby House, South Lion Gates and gatepiers to garden	Canons Ashby	Gate	Early 18th century	18 January 1968	SP5761650523; 52°09′00″N 1°09′34″W	1187120	Upload Photo
Packhorse bridge over River Cherwell	River Cherwell, Charwelton	Bridge	15th century	18 January 1968	SP5349956078; 52°12′01″N 1°13′07″W	1075316	Packhorse bridge over River Cherwell More images
Church of St Botolph	Church Brampton	Church	14th century	2 November 1954	SP7180465712; 52°17′06″N 0°56′56″W	1067098	Church of St Botolph More images
Church of St Andrew	Clay Coton	Church	14th century	18 January 1968	SP5938476967; 52°23′15″N 1°07′44″W	1287640	Church of St Andrew More images
The Chestnuts	Clipston	House	Mid-18th century	2 November 1954	SP7095981590; 52°25′40″N 0°57′28″W	1067034	Upload Photo
Church of St Denys	Cold Ashby	Church	12th century to 14th century	2 November 1954	SP6561076269; 52°22′50″N 1°02′15″W	1216470	Church of St Denys More images
Church of St Michael	Creaton	Church	Late 12th century	2 November 1954	SP7063271847; 52°20′25″N 0°57′53″W	1067105	Church of St Michael More images
Moot Hall	Daventry	House	Mid-18th century	4 December 1953	SP5739562618; 52°15′31″N 1°09′38″W	1067667	Moot Hall More images
Saracen's Head Inn	Daventry	Public house	Mid-18th century	4 December 1953	SP5712062503; 52°15′28″N 1°09′52″W	1067693	Saracen's Head Inn More images
Wheatsheaf Hotel	Daventry	Care home	Early 17th century	4 December 1953	SP5721862341; 52°15′23″N 1°09′47″W	1298930	Wheatsheaf Hotel More images
36 High Street	Daventry	House	Late 17th or early 18th century	4 December 1953	SP5728562543; 52°15′29″N 1°09′44″W	1054690	36 High Street
27 High Street	Daventry	House	Late 17th century	4 December 1953	SP5732462503; 52°15′28″N 1°09′42″W	1054700	27 High Street
57 and 59 High Street	Daventry	House	Mid-18th century	4 December 1953	SP5720362491; 52°15′27″N 1°09′48″W	1067663	Upload Photo
2 Sheaf Street	Daventry	House	17th century	4 December 1953	SP5711662468; 52°15′27″N 1°09′53″W	1067679	2 Sheaf Street
20 & 22 Sheaf Street	Daventry	House	16th or early 17th century	4 December 1953	SP5717162421; 52°15′25″N 1°09′50″W	1067680	20 & 22 Sheaf Street
29 High Street	Daventry	House	18th century	4 December 1953	SP5729662511; 52°15′28″N 1°09′43″W	1356578	29 High Street
1 Tavern Street	Daventry	House	17th century	4 December 1953	SP5713662479; 52°15′27″N 1°09′52″W	1067682	1 Tavern Street
7 New Street	Daventry	Grammar school	1600	4 December 1953	SP5743462502; 52°15′28″N 1°09′36″W	1054755	7 New Street More images
Church of St Catherine	Draughton	Church	Late 12th century	2 November 1954	SP7619276814; 52°23′03″N 0°52′55″W	1067038	Church of St Catherine More images
Church of St Mary	East Haddon	Church	12th–14th century	2 November 1954	SP6673068166; 52°18′27″N 1°01′22″W	1356896	Church of St Mary More images
Church of St Mary	Farthingstone	Church	Late 13th century	18 January 1968	SP6132055007; 52°11′24″N 1°06′16″W	1054931	Church of St Mary More images
Fawsley Farm, well house to south-west	Fawsley	Well house	Early 16th century	24 February 1987	SP5533056554; 52°12′16″N 1°11′30″W	1343553	Upload Photo
Church of All Saints	Flore	Church	13th century	18 January 1968	SP6419359847; 52°13′59″N 1°03′41″W	1055753	Church of All Saints More images
Church of St Helen	Great Oxendon	Church	13th–14th century	2 November 1954	SP7355783938; 52°26′54″N 0°55′09″W	1367480	Church of St Helen More images
Church of St Ethelreda	Guilsborough	Church	14th century	2 November 1954	SP6760672681; 52°20′53″N 1°00′32″W	1067072	Church of St Ethelreda More images
Stables of Harlestone House	Lower Harlestone, Harlestone	House	Early 19th century	2 November 1954	SP7006364558; 52°16′29″N 0°58′28″W	1067077	Stables of Harlestone House More images
Church of St Michael	Haselbech	Church	13th century	2 November 1954	SP7117777309; 52°23′21″N 0°57′20″W	1067001	Church of St Michael More images
Church of St John the Baptist	Hellidon	Church	Medieval	18 January 1968	SP5157358192; 52°13′10″N 1°14′47″W	1075284	Church of St John the Baptist More images
The Grange	Hellidon	House	1850	24 February 1987	SP5158558021; 52°13′05″N 1°14′47″W	1075290	Upload Photo
Church of All Saints	Holdenby	Church	14th century	2 November 1954	SP6918767599; 52°18′08″N 0°59′12″W	1281660	Church of All Saints More images
Holdenby House	Holdenby	Country house	c.1583	2 November 1954	SP6927767774; 52°18′13″N 0°59′08″W	1067053	Holdenby House More images
The Old Stone House	Teeton, Hollowell	Farmhouse	Early 17th century	2 November 1954	SP6949070326; 52°19′36″N 0°58′54″W	1067058	The Old Stone House More images
Church of St Denys	Kelmarsh	Church	14th century	2 November 1954	SP7352279220; 52°24′22″N 0°55′14″W	1370062	Church of St Denys More images
Church of St Faith	Kilsby	Church	13th century	18 January 1968	SP5631671137; 52°20′08″N 1°10′30″W	1031370	Church of St Faith More images
North entrance to Kilsby Railway Tunnel	London to Birmingham Railway, Kilsby	Railway tunnel portal	c.1838	11 March 1987	SP5647671459; 52°20′18″N 1°10′21″W	1076405	North entrance to Kilsby Railway Tunnel
North ventilation shaft, Kilsby Tunnel	London to Birmingham Railway, Kilsby	Ventilation shaft	c.1838	11 March 1987	SP5694270876; 52°19′59″N 1°09′57″W	1076406	North ventilation shaft, Kilsby Tunnel More images
South entrance to Kilsby Tunnel	London to Birmingham Railway, Kilsby	Railway tunnel portal	c.1838	11 March 1987	SP5786369733; 52°19′22″N 1°09′09″W	1354762	South entrance to Kilsby Tunnel
South ventilation shaft, Kilsby Tunnel	London to Birmingham Railway, Kilsby	Ventilation shaft	c.1838	11 March 1987	SP5740870300; 52°19′40″N 1°09′33″W	1343043	South ventilation shaft, Kilsby Tunnel More images
The Old Rectory	Lamport	House	c.1727–30	2 November 1954	SP7586074610; 52°21′51″N 0°53′14″W	1356930	The Old Rectory More images
Church of St Lawrence	Long Buckby	Church	Medieval	18 January 1968	SP6272467744; 52°18′15″N 1°04′53″W	1203352	Church of St Lawrence More images
Holly House	Long Buckby	House	17th century	11 March 1987	SP6292267549; 52°18′09″N 1°04′43″W	1077036	Upload Photo
Church of St Mary the Virgin	Maidwell	Church	12th, 13th century	2 November 1954	SP7491676936; 52°23′07″N 0°54′03″W	1067857	Church of St Mary the Virgin More images
Church of All Saints	Naseby	Church	Early 13th century	2 November 1954	SP6889278133; 52°23′49″N 0°59′20″W	1343441	Church of All Saints More images
Church Farmhouse	Newnham	House	17th century	29 April 1987	SP5804459627; 52°13′54″N 1°09′06″W	1076540	Upload Photo
Church of All Saints	Pitsford	Church	12th century	2 November 1954	SP7542768193; 52°18′24″N 0°53′43″W	1067059	Church of All Saints More images
Church of St Peter and St Paul	Preston Capes	Church	13th century	18 January 1968	SP5742554900; 52°11′22″N 1°09′41″W	1075292	Church of St Peter and St Paul More images
Church of St Denys	Ravensthorpe	Church	13th century	2 November 1954	SP6700070346; 52°19′38″N 1°01′06″W	1227982	Church of St Denys More images
Church of St Peter and St Paul	Scaldwell	Church	12th–14th century	2 November 1954	SP7686872574; 52°20′45″N 0°52′23″W	1343570	Church of St Peter and St Paul More images
Church of St Helen	Sibbertoft	Church	13th century	2 November 1954	SP6814682768; 52°26′19″N 0°59′56″W	1228308	Church of St Helen More images
Church of St Helen	Thornby	Church	13th century	2 November 1954	SP6696275636; 52°22′29″N 1°01′04″W	1228640	Church of St Helen More images
Church of St Peter and St Paul	Lower Weedon, Weedon Bec	Church	Late 12th century	18 January 1968	SP6333659283; 52°13′41″N 1°04′27″W	1076520	Church of St Peter and St Paul More images
Former Weedon Barracks: canal enclosure wall to north	Lower Weedon, Weedon Bec	Wall	Early 19th century	1 August 1982	SP6258059563; 52°13′51″N 1°05′07″W	1076513	Upload Photo
Former Weedon Barracks: canal enclosure wall to south	Lower Weedon, Weedon Bec	Wall	Early 19th century	1 August 1982	SP6257459550; 52°13′50″N 1°05′07″W	1281680	Former Weedon Barracks: canal enclosure wall to south
Former Weedon Barracks: east blast house of series of four in magazine enclosure	Lower Weedon, Weedon Bec	Powder magazine	1807–11	29 April 1987	SP6229759567; 52°13′51″N 1°05′21″W	1342985	Upload Photo
Former Weedon Barracks: East Lodge	Lower Weedon, Weedon Bec	Footbridge	1811–14	29 April 1987	SP6293359587; 52°13′51″N 1°04′48″W	1076511	Former Weedon Barracks: East Lodge More images
Former Weedon Barracks: east magazine of series of four in magazine enclosure	Lower Weedon, Weedon Bec	Magazine	Early–mid-19th century	29 April 1987	SP6227759565; 52°13′51″N 1°05′22″W	1203530	Upload Photo
Former Weedon Barracks: inner east of series of four blast houses in magazine enclosure	Lower Weedon, Weedon Bec	Powder magazine	Early–mid-19th century	29 April 1987	SP6225659560; 52°13′51″N 1°05′24″W	1281642	Upload Photo
Former Weedon Barracks: inner east of series of four magazines n magazine enclosure	Lower Weedon, Weedon Bec	Magazine	1807–11	29 April 1987	SP6223459563; 52°13′51″N 1°05′25″W	1076518	Upload Photo
Former Weedon Barracks: inner west of series of four blast houses in magazine enclosure	Lower Weedon, Weedon Bec	Powder magazine	1807–11	29 April 1987	SP6221259559; 52°13′51″N 1°05′26″W	1076519	Upload Photo
Former Weedon Barracks: inner west of series of four blast houses in magazine enclosure	Lower Weedon, Weedon Bec	Magazine	1807–11	29 April 1987	SP6219259559; 52°13′51″N 1°05′27″W	1281632	Upload Photo
Former Weedon Barracks: large magazine to west of the series of four magazines in magazine enclosure	Lower Weedon, Weedon Bec	Magazine	c.1857	29 April 1987	SP6209959552; 52°13′50″N 1°05′32″W	1203528	Upload Photo
Former Weedon Barracks: outer wall and north-west bastion	Lower Weedon, Weedon Bec	Boundary wall	1804–10	6 August 1982	SP6253459617; 52°13′52″N 1°05′09″W	1076512	Upload Photo
Former Weedon Barracks: outer wall, south-east and south-west bastions and gate piers to south-east	Lower Weedon, Weedon Bec	Gate	1804–10	1 August 1982	SP6271359476; 52°13′48″N 1°05′00″W	1342980	Upload Photo
Former Weedon Barracks: outer walls and north-east bastion	Lower Weedon, Weedon Bec	Gate	1804–10	6 August 1982	SP6292759648; 52°13′53″N 1°04′48″W	1281700	Upload Photo
Former Weedon Barracks: outer walls to magazine enclosure	Lower Weedon, Weedon Bec	Boundary wall	1807–11	6 August 1982	SP6225259510; 52°13′49″N 1°05′24″W	1342983	Upload Photo
Former Weedon Barracks: Storehouse Number 1	Lower Weedon, Weedon Bec	Warehouse	1804–10	29 April 1987	SP6286159602; 52°13′52″N 1°04′52″W	1342981	Upload Photo
Former Weedon Barracks: Storehouse Number 17	Lower Weedon, Weedon Bec	Warehouse	1902	6 August 1982	SP6249159565; 52°13′51″N 1°05′11″W	1281668	Upload Photo
Former Weedon Barracks: Storehouse Number 2	Lower Weedon, Weedon Bec	Warehouse	1804–10	29 April 1987	SP6286359548; 52°13′50″N 1°04′52″W	1076515	Former Weedon Barracks: Storehouse Number 2
Former Weedon Barracks: Storehouse Number 3	Lower Weedon, Weedon Bec	Warehouse	1804–10	29 April 1987	SP6278659598; 52°13′52″N 1°04′56″W	1203495	Upload Photo
Former Weedon Barracks: Storehouse Number 4	Lower Weedon, Weedon Bec	Warehouse	1804–10	29 April 1987	SP6279559544; 52°13′50″N 1°04′55″W	1342982	Former Weedon Barracks: Storehouse Number 4
Former Weedon Barracks: Storehouse Number 5	Lower Weedon, Weedon Bec	Warehouse	1804–10	29 April 1987	SP6268059589; 52°13′51″N 1°05′01″W	1076514	Upload Photo
Former Weedon Barracks: Storehouse Number 6	Lower Weedon, Weedon Bec	Warehouse	1804–10	29 April 1987	SP6269459536; 52°13′50″N 1°05′01″W	1203512	Former Weedon Barracks: Storehouse Number 6
Former Weedon Barracks: Storehouse Number 7	Lower Weedon, Weedon Bec	Workshop	1804–10	29 April 1987	SP6260859586; 52°13′51″N 1°05′05″W	1203504	Upload Photo
Former Weedon Barracks: Storehouse Number 8	Lower Weedon, Weedon Bec	Warehouse	1804–10	29 April 1987	SP6261059530; 52°13′50″N 1°05′05″W	1076516	Former Weedon Barracks: Storehouse Number 8
Former Weedon Barracks: west blast house of series of four in magazine enclosure	Lower Weedon, Weedon Bec	Powder magazine	1807–11	29 April 1987	SP6217159558; 52°13′51″N 1°05′28″W	1342984	Upload Photo
Former Weedon Barracks: West Lodge	Lower Weedon, Weedon Bec	Gate	Early 19th century	29 April 1987	SP6254159548; 52°13′50″N 1°05′09″W	1203443	Former Weedon Barracks: West Lodge
Former Weedon Barracks: west magazine of series of four in magazine enclosure	Lower Weedon, Weedon Bec	Magazine	1807–11	29 April 1987	SP6214959558; 52°13′51″N 1°05′29″W	1076517	Upload Photo
Church of St Mary	Welford	Church	13th–15th century	2 November 1954	SP6412380336; 52°25′02″N 1°03′31″W	1228655	Church of St Mary More images
Church of St Martin	Welton	Church	14th century	18 January 1968	SP5810966026; 52°17′21″N 1°08′58″W	1077025	Church of St Martin More images
Church of St Michael	Winwick	Church	13th century	18 January 1985	SP6256973864; 52°21′33″N 1°04′58″W	1229677	Church of St Michael More images
Gate arch approx. 30m south of south front of Manor House	Winwick	Manor house	Early 17th century	18 September 1953	SP6256173931; 52°21′36″N 1°04′58″W	1278961	Gate arch approx. 30m south of south front of Manor House
Winwick Manor	Winwick	House	16th century	18 September 1953	SP6260173953; 52°21′36″N 1°04′56″W	1229787	Winwick Manor More images
Church of St Mary the Virgin	Woodford Halse, Woodford cum Membris	Church	13th century	18 January 1968	SP5431252881; 52°10′17″N 1°12′26″W	1203286	Church of St Mary the Virgin More images
Manor House	Hinton, Woodford cum Membris	Manor house	Late 17th century	18 September 1953	SP5383652543; 52°10′07″N 1°12′51″W	1355036	Upload Photo

== See also ==
- Grade I listed buildings in Northamptonshire
- Grade II* listed buildings in Northamptonshire
  - Grade II* listed buildings in Corby
  - Grade II* listed buildings in East Northamptonshire
  - Grade II* listed buildings in Kettering (borough)
  - Grade II* listed buildings in Northampton
  - Grade II* listed buildings in South Northamptonshire
  - Grade II* listed buildings in Wellingborough (borough)
