= Anglican Diocese of Peterborough =

Diocese of the Church of England

Coordinates: 52°34′21″N 0°14′20″W

Diocese of Peterborough Dioecesis Petroburgensis
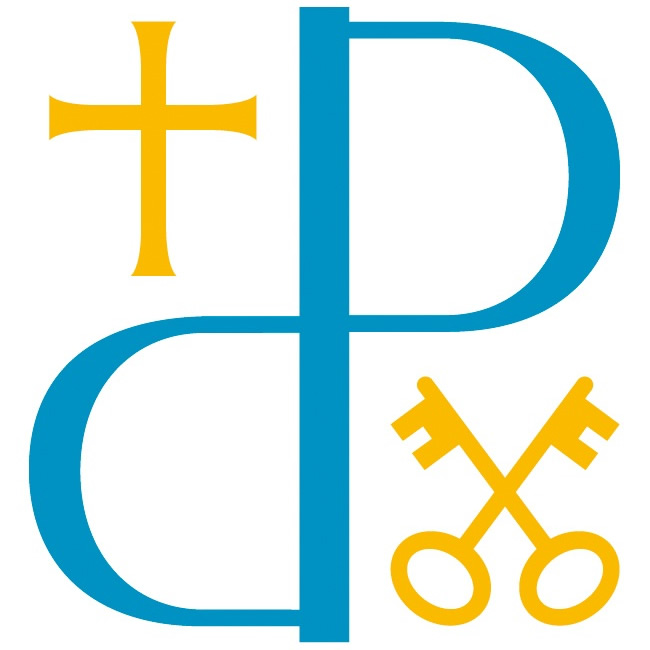
- Diocesan logo

- Coat of arms

Location
- Ecclesiastical province: Canterbury
- Archdeaconries: Northampton, Oakham

Statistics
- Parishes: 352
- Churches: 386

Information
- Cathedral: Peterborough Cathedral
- Language: English

Current leadership
- Bishop: Debbie Sellin
- Suffragan: Alex Hughes, Bishop of Brixworth
- Archdeacons: Richard Ormston, Archdeacon of Northampton; Alison Booker, Archdeacon of Oakham

Website
- peterborough-diocese.org.uk

The Diocese of Peterborough forms part of the Province of Canterbury in England. Its seat is the Cathedral Church of Saint Peter, Saint Paul and Saint Andrew, which was founded as a monastery in AD 655 and re-built in its present form between 1118 and 1238.

== History ==
Founded at the Dissolution of the Monasteries in 1541 (it was until then part of the Diocese of Lincoln), the Diocese covers the areas of:

- The Soke of Peterborough
- The county of Northamptonshire and
- The county of Rutland.

From 1839 till 1927 the Peterborough diocese covered the territory of the Archdeaconry of Leicester which is now the (modern) Diocese of Leicester.

Peterborough Abbey became a cathedral at the Reformation, one of six wholly new bishoprics founded under Henry VIII. On 4 September 1541 letters patent were issued converting the abbey church of Peterborough into a cathedral church, with a dean and chapter and ecclesiastical staff. The last abbot, John Chambers, was consecrated in his former abbey church on 23 October 1541 as the first Bishop of Peterborough.

A link with the Anglican Church of Kenya Diocese of Bungoma was formed by the two bishops following the Lambeth Conference in 1998.

In 1851 the diocese comprised the following rural deaneries:

- Covering Leicestershire: Akeley, Christianity, Framland, Gartree, Goscote, Guthlaxton, Sparkenhoe.
- Covering Northamptonshire: Brackley, Daventry, Haddon, Higham Ferrers, Northampton, Oundle, Peterborough Preston, Rothwell, Weldon.
- Covering Rutland: Rutland.

== Organisation ==
The Diocese is divided into two Archdeaconries:

- The Archdeaconry of Northampton, and
- The Archdeaconry of Oakham (created in 1875 by splitting the Archdeaconry of Northampton).

The parts of the City of Peterborough that are south of the River Nene, and so were in the historic county of Huntingdonshire rather than the Soke of Peterborough, fall within the Diocese of Ely. The previous Bishop of Peterborough was commissioned as Assistant Bishop in the Ely Diocese so he could exercise pastoral care in these parishes, which include Stanground, Orton, Woodston, Yaxley and Fletton. Thorney, historically in the Isle of Ely and now within the boundaries of the Peterborough unitary authority area, is unaffected by this arrangement.

=== Bishops ===
The Bishop of Peterborough (Debbie Sellin) leads the diocese, and is assisted by the Bishop suffragan of Brixworth (vacant). The suffragan see of Brixworth was created by Order in Council on 26 July 1988.

Alternative episcopal oversight (for parishes in the diocese which reject the ministry of priests who are women) is provided by the provincial episcopal visitor, Luke Irvine-Capel, Bishop suffragan of Richborough, who is licensed as an honorary assistant bishop of the diocese in order to facilitate his work there. There is also one former bishop, Ed Condry, living in the diocese who is licensed as honorary assistant bishop.

== Territorial irregularities ==
The diocese comprises the areas of Northamptonshire, Rutland and Peterborough with the following exceptions (clockwise from Stamford):

- The areas of Wothorpe and St Martin's Without in Peterborough belong to the Diocese of Lincoln.
- The areas of North Side (to the south of Thorney), Stanground, Fletton, Woodston, Hampton and Orton in Peterborough belong to the Diocese of Ely.
- The areas of Stibbington, Water Newton and Washingley in Cambridgeshire belong to the Diocese of Peterborough.
- The eastern half of Salcey Forest in Northamptonshire belongs to the Diocese of Oxford.
- A small area at Brackley Hatch, between Syresham and Silverstone, is an exclave of the Diocese of Oxford.
- The area of Onley to the west of Barby in Northamptonshire belongs to the Diocese of Coventry.
- The areas of Stanford-on-Avon, Hothorpe and Little Oxendon in Northamptonshire belong to the Diocese of Leicester.
- The area of Holyoaks, south-west of Stoke Dry, in Leicestershire, belongs to the Diocese of Peterborough.
- The area of Carlby, and two small areas on the western edge of Stamford, in Lincolnshire, belong to the Diocese of Peterborough.

== List of churches ==
=== Extra-parochial places ===
- Althorp (population 26)
- Borough Fen (population 120)
- Canons Ashby (population 43): St Mary's Church, Canons Ashby (medieval, closed C20th)
- Leighfield (population 2)
- Mawsley (population 14)
- Minster Precincts (population 246): Cathedral Church of St Peter, St Paul and St Andrew, Peterborough (medieval)
- Salcey Forest (population 19)
- Undivided Land Between Badby and Newnham (population 8)

=== Archdeaconry of Northampton ===
==== Deanery of Brackley ====
- Benefice of Astwell
  - Parish of Helmdon with Stuchbury and Radstone (population 923)
    - St Mary Magdalene's Church, Helmdon (medieval)
    - St Lawrence's Church, Radstone (medieval, parishes merged 1971)
    - St John's Church, Stuchbury (medieval, destroyed C16th, parishes merged 1560)
  - Parish of Lois Weedon (population 327)
    - SS Mary & Peter's Church, Weedon Lois (medieval)
    - St John the Baptist's Church, Plumpton (medieval, parishes merged 1928, closed)
  - Parish of Syresham (population 875): St James the Great's Church (medieval)
  - Parish of Wappenham (population 355): St Mary the Virgin's Church (medieval)
  - Parish of Whitfield (population 209): St John the Evangelist's Church (medieval)
- Benefice of Astwick Vale
  - Parish of Aynho (population 643): St Michael's Church (medieval)
  - Parish of Croughton (population 1,219): All Saints' Church (medieval)
  - Parish of Evenley (population 591): St George's Church (medieval, rebuilt 1864)
  - Parish of Farthinghoe (population 339): St Michael & All Angels' Church (medieval)
  - Parish of Hinton-In-The-Hedges with Steane (population 256)
    - Most Holy Trinity Church, Hinton-in-the-Hedges (medieval)
    - St Peter's Church, Steane (medieval, parishes merged C16th)
- Benefice and Parish of Brackley St Peter with St James (population 16,326)
  - St Peter's Church, Brackley (medieval)
  - Halse Mission Chapel (1900)
  - St James's Church, Brackley (medieval, demolished 1836)
  - St Mary's Chapel, Halse (medieval, closed c. C17th)
- Benefice of Chenderit
  - Parish of Chacombe (population 693): SS Peter & Paul's Church (medieval)
  - Parish of Greatworth (population 113): St Peter's Church (medieval)
  - Parish of Marston St Lawrence (population 779): St Lawrence's Church (medieval)
  - Parish of Middleton Cheney: All Saints (population 4,114): All Saints' Church (medieval)
  - Parish of Sulgrave (population 425): St James the Less's Church (medieval)
  - Parish of Thenford (population 73): St Mary the Virgin's Church (medieval)
  - Parish of Thorpe Mandeville (population 178): St John the Baptist's Church (medieval)
  - Parish of Warkworth (population 256): St Mary's Church (medieval)
- Benefice of Culworth
  - Parish of Chipping Warden (population 554): SS Peter & Paul's Church (medieval)
  - Parish of Culworth (population 416): St Mary the Virgin's Church (medieval)
  - Parish of Edgcote (population 69): St James's Church (medieval)
  - Parish of Moreton Pinkney (population 367): St Mary the Virgin's Church (medieval)
- Benefice of Five Ways
  - Parish of Aston-le-Walls (population 306): St Leonard's Church (medieval)
  - Parish of Boddington (population 705): St John the Baptist's Church, Upper Boddington (medieval)
  - Parish of Byfield (population 1,318): Holy Cross Church (medieval)
  - Parish of Eydon (population 431): St Nicholas' Church (medieval)
  - Parish of Woodford Halse (population 4,280): St Mary the Virgin's Church (medieval)
- Benefice of King's Sutton and Newbottle and Charlton
  - Parish of King's Sutton (population 2,320)
    - SS Peter & Paul's Church (medieval)
    - St Rumbold's Chapel, Walton (medieval, closed C16th)
  - Parish of Newbottle with Charlton (population 538): St James's Church, Newbottle (medieval)

==== Deanery of Brixworth ====
- Benefice of Brixworth with Holcot
  - Parish of Brixworth (population 5,756): All Saints' Church (Saxon)
  - Parish of Holcot (population 425): St Mary & All Saints' Church (medieval)
- Benefice of Crick and Yelvertoft with Clay Coton and Lilbourne
  - Parish of Crick (population 2,411): St Margaret of Antioch's Church (medieval)
  - Parish of Lilbourne (population 451): All Saints' Church (medieval)
  - Parish of Yelvertoft with Clay Coton (population 910)
    - All Saints' Church, Yelvertoft (medieval)
    - St Andrew's Church, Clay Coton (medieval, closed 1950s, parishes merged 1972)
    - Elkington Parish Church (medieval, closed C15th)
- Benefice of Faxton
  - Parish of Arthingworth (population 237): St Andrew's Church (medieval)
  - Parish of Draughton (population 71): St Catherine's Church (medieval)
  - Parish of East Farndon (population 317): St John the Baptist's Church (medieval)
  - Parish of Harrington (population 144): SS Peter & Paul's Church (medieval)
  - Parish of Lamport with Faxton (population 244)
    - All Saints' Church, Lamport (medieval)
    - St Denis' Church, Faxton (medieval, closed 1939, demolished 1959)
  - Parish of Maidwell (population 346)
    - St Mary the Virgin's Church (medieval)
    - St Peter's Church (medieval, demolished 1543)
  - Parish of Oxendon (population 334): St Helen's Church, Great Oxendon (medieval)
- Benefice of Long Buckby with Watford and West Haddon with Winwick
  - Parish of Long Buckby (population 4,463)
    - St Lawrence's Church (medieval)
    - Long Buckby Wharf Mission Church (1875, closed 1960s)
  - Parish of Watford (population 347): SS Peter & Paul's Church (medieval)
  - Parish of West Haddon (population 1,975): All Saints' Church (medieval)
  - Parish of Winwick (population 114): St Michael & All Angels' Church (medieval)
- Benefice of Naseby
  - Parish of Clipston (population 696)
    - All Saints' Church (medieval)
    - Nobold Church (medieval, abandoned c. C16th)
  - Parish of Haselbech (population 107): St Michael's Church (medieval)
  - Parish of Kelmarsh (population 102): St Denys' Church (medieval)
  - Parish of Marston Trussell (population 148): St Nicholas' Church (medieval)
  - Parish of Naseby (population 780): All Saints' Church (medieval)
  - Parish of Sibbertoft (population 348): St Helen's Church (medieval)
  - Parish of Welford (population 1,328)
    - St Mary the Virgin's Church (medieval)
    - St Botolph's Church, Sulby (medieval, abandoned c. 1400)
- Benefice of Pitsford with Boughton
  - Parish of Boughton (population 2,303)
    - St John the Baptist's New Church (medieval, formerly chapel)
    - St John the Baptist's Old Church (medieval, ruined C18th)
  - Parish of Pitsford (population 719): All Saints' Church (medieval)
- Benefice of Spencer
  - Parish of Brington (population 486)
    - St Mary's Church, Great Brington (medieval)
    - St John's Church, Little Brington (1855, demolished except tower 1947)
  - Parish of Church Brampton with Chapel Brampton (population 786)
    - St Botolph's Church, Church Brampton (medieval)
    - St Margaret's Chapel, Chapel Brampton (medieval, closed Middle Ages)
  - Parish of East Haddon and Holdenby (population 786)
    - St Mary the Virgin's Church, East Haddon (medieval)
    - All Saints' Church, Holdenby (medieval, closed and parishes merged 1972)
  - Parish of Harlestone (population 1,125): St Andrew's Church (medieval)
  - Parish of Norton (population 373)
    - All Saints' Church (medieval)
    - St John the Baptist's Chapel, Thrupp (medieval, ruined C16th)
  - Parish of Whilton (population 301): St Andrew's Church (medieval)
- Benefice of Uplands
  - Parish of Cold Ashby (population 284): St Denys' Church (medieval)
  - Parish of Cottesbrooke (population 131): All Saints' Church (medieval)
  - Parish of Great Creaton (population 436): St Michael & All Angels' Church, Creaton (medieval)
  - Parish of Guilsborough (population 740): St Etheldreda's Church (medieval)
  - Parish of Hollowell (population 320): St James' Church (1840, parish church 1850)
  - Parish of Ravensthorpe (population 717): St Denys' Church (medieval)
  - Parish of Spratton (population 1,357): St Andrew's Church (medieval)
  - Parish of Thornby (population 180): St Helen's Church (medieval)
- Benefice of Walgrave
  - Parish of Hannington (population 269): SS Peter & Paul's Church (medieval)
  - Parish of Old (population 464): St Andrew's Church (medieval)
  - Parish of Scaldwell (population 291): SS & Paul's Church (medieval)
  - Parish of Walgrave (population 946): St Peter's Church (medieval)

==== Deanery of Daventry ====
- Benefice of Barby and Kilsby
  - Parish of Barby (population 1,087)
    - St Mary's Church (medieval)
    - Onley Chapel (abandoned Middle Ages)
  - Parish of Kilsby (population 1,330): St Faith's Church (medieval)
- Benefice of Braunston, Ashby St Ledgers and Welton
  - Parish of Ashby St Ledgers (population 146): The Blessed Virgin Mary & St Leodegarius' Church (medieval)
  - Parish of Braunston (population 1,826): All Saints' Church (medieval, rebuilt 1849)
  - Parish of Welton (population 594): St Martin's Church (medieval)
- Benefice of Bugbrooke, Harpole, Kislingbury and Rothersthorpe
  - Parish of Bugbrooke (population 3,027): St Michael & All Angels' Church (medieval)
  - Parish of Harpole (population 1,550): All Saints' Church (medieval)
  - Parish of Kislingbury (population 2,888): St Luke's Church (medieval)
  - Parish of Rothersthorpe (population 458): SS Peter & Paul's Church (medieval)
- Benefice and Parish of Daventry (population 28,104)
  - Holy Cross Church (medieval, rebuilt 1758)
  - St James's Church (1839, parish created 1840, closed 1962)
- Benefice of Heyford with Stowe Nine Churches and Flore with Brockhall
  - Parish of Brockhall (population 88): SS Peter & Paul's Church (medieval)
  - Parish of Flore (population 1,449): All Saints' Church (medieval)
  - Parish of Heyford (population 1,721): SS Peter & Paul's Church, Nether Heyford (medieval)
  - Parish of Stowe Nine Churches (population 255)
    - St Michael's Church, Church Stowe (Saxon/medieval)
    - St James's Church, Upper Stowe (1855)
- Benefice of Knightley
  - Parish of Badby (population 891): St Mary's Church (medieval)
  - Parish of Charwelton (population 215): Holy Trinity Church (medieval)
  - Parish of Fawsley (population 24): St Mary the Virgin's Church (medieval)
  - Parish of Newnham (population 410): St Michael & All Angels' Church (medieval)
  - Parish of Preston Capes (population 201): SS Peter & Paul's Church (medieval)
- Benefice of Staverton, Hellidon and Catesby
  - Parish of Catesby (population 60)
    - SS Mary & Edmund's Church, Lower Catesby (C17th, rebuilt 1862)
    - St Mary's Church, Upper Catesby (medieval, ruined C16th)
  - Parish of Hellidon (population 205): St John the Baptist's Church (medieval)
  - Parish of Staverton (population 478): St Mary the Virgin's Church (medieval)
- Benefice of Weedon Bec with Everdon and Dodford
  - Parish of Dodford (population 195): St Mary the Virgin's Church (medieval)
  - Parish of Everdon (population 353): St Mary's Church (medieval)
  - Parish of Weedon Bec (population 2,870): SS Peter & Paul's Church (medieval)

==== Deanery of Greater Northampton ====
- Benefice and Parish of Abington (population 7,667): SS Peter & Paul's Church (medieval, rebuilt except tower 1821)
- Benefice and Parish of Billing (population 15,261)
  - St Andrew's Church, Great Billing (medieval)
  - All Saints' Church, Little Billing (medieval)
- Benefice of Dallington and St James
  - Parish of Dallington (population 4,595): St Mary's Church (medieval)
  - Parish of Northampton St James (population 9,188): St James's Church, St James's End (1868, parish church 1872)
- Benefice and Parish of Duston and Upton (population 26,035)
  - St Luke's Church, Duston (medieval)
  - St Francis' Church, Duston (1967)
  - Grace Church Upton (2021, meets in primary school)
  - St Michael's Church, Upton (medieval chapelry to St Peter's Northampton, parish church 1851, closed 1981)
  - St Barnabas' Church, New Duston (1887, closed C20th)
- Benefice and Parish of King's Heath (population 4,726)
  - Church on the Heath Local Ecumenical Partnership (2007, meets in primary school since 2022)
  - Church on the Heath Local Ecumenical Partnership Old Building (built 1950s as Baptist church, closed 2021)
  - St Augustine's Church (1950s, parish church 1964, closed 2006)
- Benefice and Parish of Kingsthorpe (population 23,929)
  - St John the Baptist's Church (medieval chapelry to St Peter's Northampton, parish church 1850, rebuilt C19th)
  - St David's Church (1940, parish church 1967)
  - St Mark's Church (c. 1960)
- Benefice of Living Brook
  - Parish of Hardingstone (population 2,246): St Edmund King & Martyr's Church (medieval)
  - Parish of Piddington with Horton (population 1,852)
    - St John the Baptist's Church, Piddington (medieval)
    - St Mary Magdalene's Church, Horton (medieval, closed 2012)
  - Parish of Quinton and Preston Deanery (population 280)
    - St John the Baptist's Church, Quinton (medieval)
    - SS Peter & Paul's Church, Preston Deanery (medieval, closed 1972)
- Benefice and Parish of Moulton (population 7,779): SS Peter & Paul's Church (medieval)
- Benefice of Northampton All Saints Holy Sepulchre
  - Parish of Northampton All Saints with St Katherine and St Peter (population 2,878)
    - All Saints' Church (medieval, rebuilt 1680)
    - St Peter's Church (medieval, closed 1995)
    - St Katherine's Church (built and parish church 1839, parishes merged 1949, demolished 1950)
    - St Gregory's Church (medieval, closed C16th)
    - St Mary's Church by the Castle (medieval, closed C16th, parish abolished 1589)
    - St Margaret's Church without Westgate (medieval, closed in or before C16th)
    - St Katherine's Chapel (medieval, closed C16th)
    - St Martin's Chapel (medieval, closed C14th/15th)
    - St Thomas's Chapel (medieval, closed Middle Ages)
  - Parish of Northampton Holy Sepulchre with St Andrew & St Lawrence (population 6,189)
    - Holy Sepulchre Church (medieval)
    - St Andrew's Church (1841, parish church 1842, parishes merged 1965, demolished 1970s)
    - St Lawrence the Martyr's Church (built 1878, parish church 1879, closed C20th)
    - St Crispin's Chapel of Ease (1884, closed 1920s)
    - St Bartholomew's Church without Northgate (medieval, closed late C15th)
    - St Michael's Church (medieval, closed C16th)
- Benefice of Northampton Christ Church St Michael
  - Parish of Northampton Christ Church (population 4,751): Christ Church (parish 1898, built 1906)
  - Parish of Northampton St Michael & All Angels with St Edmund (population 11,762)
    - St Michael & All Angels' Church (1882, parish church 1883)
    - St Edmund's Church (parish 1846, built 1850, demolished c. 1980)
    - St Gabriel's Church (1894, closed 1925)
- Benefice and Parish of Northampton Emmanuel (population 29,995)
  - Emmanuel Church (1974)
  - Boothville Community Church (1990s, meets in community centre)
  - Rectory Farm Community Church (1990s, meets in community centre)
- Benefice and Parish of Northampton Holy Trinity and St Paul (population 10,371)
  - Holy Trinity Church (c. 1910, parish 1907)
  - St Paul's Church (parish 1877, built 1890, closed C20th)
- Benefice and Parish of Northampton St Alban the Martyr (population 11,882): St Alban's Church (1938, parish church 1951)
- Benefice and Parish of Northampton St Benedict (population 19,176): St Benedict's Church, West Hunsbury, Northampton (1982)
- Benefice and Parish of Northampton St Giles (population 4,603)
  - St Giles' Church (medieval)
  - St Edmund's Church without Eastgate (medieval, closed c. 1550)
- Benefice and Parish of Northampton St Mary the Virgin (population 11,939): St Mary the Virgin's Church, Far Cotton (1875, built 1885)
- Benefice and Parish of Northampton St Matthew (population 7,635): St Matthew's Church (1893)
- Benefice and Parish of Weston Favell (population 8,089): St Peter's Church (medieval)
- Benefice and Parish of Wootton (population 14,550)
  - St George the Martyr's Church (medieval)
  - Grange Park Church Local Ecumenical Partnership (2000s, meets in a community centre)

==== Deanery of Towcester ====
- Benefice of Amelcote
  - Parish of Cold Higham (population 319): St Luke's Church (medieval)
  - Parish of Gayton (population 547): St Mary's Church (medieval)
  - Parish of Pattishall (population 1,453): Holy Cross Church (medieval)
  - Parish of Tiffield (population 333): St John the Baptist's Church (medieval)
- Benefice of Grand Union
  - Parish of Alderton (population 106): St Margaret's Church (medieval, rebuilt 1528, rebuilt except tower 1848)
  - Parish of Blisworth (population 1,854): St John the Baptist's Church (medieval)
  - Parish of Grafton Regis (population 138): St Mary's Church (medieval)
  - Parish of Milton Malsor (population 805): Holy Cross Church (medieval)
  - Parish of Stoke Bruerne (population 700)
    - St Mary the Virgin's Church (medieval)
    - St Anne's New Chapel, Shutlanger (1885)
    - St Anne's Old Chapel, Shutlanger (medieval, closed C16th)
- Benefice of Lambfold
  - Parish of Adstone (population 95): All Saints' Church (medieval chapel to Canons Ashby, parish church 1867)
  - Parish of Blakesley (population 703): St Mary's Church (medieval)
  - Parish of Farthingstone (population 190): St Mary the Virgin's Church (medieval)
  - Parish of Litchborough (population 336): St Martin's Church (medieval)
  - Parish of Maidford (population 198): SS Peter & Paul's Church (medieval)
- Benefice and Parish of Passenham with Old Stratford with Deanshanger (population 6,542)
  - St Guthlac's Church, Passenham (medieval)
  - Holy Trinity Church, Deanshanger (1853)
- Benefice of Salcey
  - Parish of Ashton (population 543): St Michael & All Angels' Church (medieval)
  - Parish of Collingtree (population 2,543): St Columba's Church (medieval)
  - Parish of Courteenhall (population 112): SS Peter & Paul's Church (medieval)
  - Parish of Hartwell (population 1,880)
    - St John the Baptist's Church (1851)
    - St John the Baptist's Old Chapel (medieval, closed c. C16th)
  - Parish of Roade (population 3,582): St Mary the Virgin's Church (medieval)
- Benefice of South Cleley
  - Parish of Cosgrove (population 649): SS Peter & Paul's Church (medieval)
  - Parish of Potterspury with Furtho and Yardley Gobion (population 2,933)
    - St Nicholas' Church, Potterspury (medieval)
    - St Leonard's Church, Yardley Gobion (1864)
    - St Bartholomew's Church, Furtho (medieval, parishes merged 1921, closed 1989)
  - Parish of Wicken (population 340)
    - St John the Evangelist's Church, Wick Dive (medieval)
    - St James's Church, Wick Hamon (medieval, parishes merged 1587, demolished 1619)
- Benefice of Tove
  - Parish of Bradden (population 149): St Michael's Church (medieval)
  - Parish of Easton Neston (population 1,443): St Mary's Church (medieval)
  - Parish of Greens Norton (population 1,680): St Bartholomew's Church (medieval)
  - Parish of Towcester (population 10,121)
    - St Lawrence's Church (medieval)
    - St Augustine's Mission Chapel, Caldecote (C19th/20th)
- Benefice of Whittlewood
  - Parish of Abthorpe (population 351): St John the Baptist's Church (medieval chapel to Towcester, parish church 1737, rebuilt 1871)
  - Parish of Paulerspury (population 1,116): St James the Great's Church (medieval)
  - Parish of Silverstone (population 2,830): St Michael's Church (medieval, rebuilt 1780, 1884)
  - Parish of Slapton (population 83): St Botolph's Church (medieval)
  - Parish of Whittlebury (population 566): St Mary's Church (medieval)

==== Deanery of Wellingborough ====
- Benefice and Parish of Earls Barton (population 6,361): All Saints' Church (Saxon)
- Benefice of Great Doddington and Wilby and Ecton
  - Parish of Ecton (population 489): St Mary Magdalene's Church (medieval)
  - Parish of Great Doddington (population 3,055): St Nicholas' Church (medieval)
  - Parish of Wilby (population 639): St Mary the Virgin's Church (medieval)
- Benefice of Great Harrowden with Little Harrowden and Orlingbury and Isham with Pytchley
  - Parish of Great Harrowden (population 1,033): All Saints' Church (medieval)
  - Parish of Isham (population 814): St Peter's Church (medieval)
  - Parish of Little Harrowden (population 962): St Mary the Virgin's Church (medieval, parish church 1725)
  - Parish of Orlingbury (population 454): St Mary's Church (medieval, rebuilt 1843)
  - Parish of Pytchley (population 499): All Saints' Church (medieval)
- Benefice and Parish of Irchester with Stanton Cross (population 4,911): St Katharine's Church, Irchester (medieval)
- Benefice of Mears Ashby
  - Parish of Hardwick (population 94): St Leonard's Church (medieval)
  - Parish of Mears Ashby (population 458): All Saints' Church (medieval)
  - Parish of Sywell with Overstone (population 2,171)
    - SS Peter & Paul's Church, Sywell (medieval)
    - St Nicholas' New Church, Overstone (1807)
    - St Nicholas' Old Church, Overstone (medieval, ruined C18th)
- Benefice and Parish of North Wellingborough (population 6,525): North Wellingborough Anglican Church (1990, formerly Gleneagles Anglican Church, meets in a primary school)
- Benefice and Parish of Wellingborough All Hallows (population 5,617): All Hallows' Church (medieval)
- Benefice and Parish of Wellingborough All Saints (population 10,288): All Saints' Church (1868, parish church 1872)
- Benefice of Wellingborough St Andrew St Barnabas
  - Parish of Wellingborough St Andrew (population 6,314): St Andrew's Church (1936; parish church 1964)
  - Parish of Wellingborough St Barnabas (population 6,571): St Barnabas' Church (1873, rebuilt 1893, parish church 1910)
- Benefice and Parish of Wellingborough St Mark (population 9,507): St Mark's Church (1960s, parish church 1969)
- Benefice and Parish of Wellingborough St Mary the Virgin (population 6,366): St Mary the Virgin's Church (built 1908–1930, parish church 1904)
- Benefice of Wymersley
  - Parish of Brafield-on-the-Green (population 649): St Laurence's Church (medieval)
  - Parish of Cogenhoe (population 1,429): St Peter's Church (medieval)
  - Parish of Great Houghton (population 667): St Mary the Virgin's Church (medieval)
  - Parish of Little Houghton (population 457): St Mary the Virgin's Church (medieval)
- Benefice of Wollaston with Strixton and Bozeat and Easton Maudit
  - Parish of Bozeat (population 2,074): St Mary the Virgin's Church (medieval)
  - Parish of Easton Maudit (population 103): St Peter & St Paul's Church (medieval)
  - Parish of Wollaston with Strixton (population 3,572)
    - St Mary's Church, Wollaston (medieval, rebuilt 1737)
    - St Romwald's Church, Strixton (medieval, rebuilt 1873, parishes merged 1929)
- Benefice of Yardley Hastings
  - Parish of Castle Ashby (population 115): St Mary Magdalene's Church (medieval)
  - Parish of Denton (population 750): St Margaret's Church (medieval, rebuilt 1828, parish church 1892)
  - Parish of Grendon (population 555): St Mary's Church (medieval)
  - Parish of Whiston (population 44): St Mary the Virgin's Church (medieval, rebuilt C16th)
  - Parish of Yardley Hastings (population 748): St Andrew's Church (medieval)

=== Archdeaconry of Oakham ===
==== Deanery of Corby ====
- Benefice and Parish of Corby St Columba (population 18,667): St Columba and the Northern Saints' Church (1940, current building 1957)
- Benefice and Parish of Corby St John the Baptist with the Epiphany (population 11,591)
  - St John the Baptist Church, Corby (medieval)
  - Church of the Epiphany, Corby (C20th, closed 2011, now a gym)
- Benefice and Parish of Corby St Peter & St Andrew with Kingswood Church (population 17,385)
  - SS Peter & Andrew's Church (1961, current building 1967)
  - Kingswood Church, Corby (C20th?, closed)
- Benefice and Parish of Great and Little Oakley (population 14,194)
  - St Michael & All Angels' Church, Great Oakley (medieval)
  - St Peter's Church, Little Oakley (parishes merged 1972, closed 1977)
- Benefice of Gretton with Rockingham and Cottingham with East Carlton
  - Parish of Cottingham (population 1,419): St Mary Magdalene's Church (medieval)
  - Parish of East Carlton (population 225): St Peter's Church (medieval, rebuilt 1788)
  - Parish of Gretton (population 1,525)
    - St James the Great's Church (medieval)
    - Kirby Church (medieval, demolished C17th)
  - Parish of Rockingham (population 672): St Leonard's Church (medieval, rebuilt C19th)
- Benefice of Harpers Brook
  - Parish of Brigstock with Stanion (population 4,582)
    - St Andrew's Church, Brigstock (medieval)
    - St Peter's Church, Stanion (medieval)
  - Parish of Lowick (population 215): St Peter's Church (medieval)
  - Parish of Sudborough (population 195): All Saints' Church (medieval)
- Benefice of Stoke Albany with Wilbarston and Ashley with Weston-By-Welland and Sutton Bassett
  - Parish of Ashley (population 249): St Mary the Virgin's Church (medieval)
  - Parish of Stoke Albany (population 322): St Botolph's Church (medieval)
  - Parish of Weston-by-Welland (population 270)
    - St Mary the Virgin's Church (medieval, rebuilt 1865)
    - All Saints' Church, Sutton Bassett (medieval)
  - Parish of Wilbarston (population 695): All Saints' Church (medieval)
- Benefice and Parish of Weldon with Deene (population 7,005)
  - St Mary the Virgin's Church, Weldon (medieval)
  - St Peter's Church, Deene (medieval, closed C20th)

==== Deanery of Higham ====
- Benefice and Parish of Finedon (population 4,536): St Mary the Virgin's Church (medieval)
- Benefice of Four Spires
  - Parish of Hargrave (population 214): All Hallows' Church (medieval)
  - Parish of Raunds (population 9,869): St Peter's Church (medieval)
  - Parish of Ringstead (population 2,059): Church of the Nativity of the Blessed Virgin Mary (medieval)
  - Parish of Stanwick (population 1,885): St Laurence's Church (medieval)
- Benefice of Higham Ferrers and Chelveston
  - Parish of Chelveston (population 554): St John the Baptist's Church (medieval)
  - Parish of Higham Ferrers (population 8,900): St Mary the Virgin's Church (medieval)
- Benefice of Nene Crossings
  - Parish of Great Addington (population 300): All Saints' Church (medieval)
  - Parish of Irthlingborough (population 9,980)
    - St Peter's Church (medieval)
    - All Saints' Church (medieval, abandoned C16th)
  - Parish of Little Addington (population 322): St Mary the Virgin's Church (medieval)
  - Parish of Woodford (population 1,480): St Mary the Virgin's Church (medieval)
- Benefice of Rushden St Mary with Newton Bromswold
  - Parish of Newton Bromswold (population 62): St Peter's Church (medieval)
  - Parish of Rushden St Mary (population 11,394): St Mary's Church (medieval)
- Benefice and Parish of Rushden St Peter (population 9,387): St Peter's Church (1907, parish church 1913)
- Benefice of Rushden Whitefriars (population 10,783): Whitefriars Church (1992, meets in a school)

==== Deanery of Kettering ====
- Benefice of Barton Seagrave with Warkton
  - Parish of Barton Seagrave (population 8,592): St Botolph's Church (medieval)
  - Parish of Warkton (population 145): St Edmund King & Martyr's Church (medieval)
- Benefice of Broughton with Cransley and Mawsley
  - Parish of Broughton (population 1,990): St Andrew's Church (medieval)
  - Parish of Cransley and Mawsley (population 3,101)
    - St Andrew's Church, Cransley (medieval)
    - Mawsley Church (C21st, meets in community centre)
- Benefice and Parish of Burton Latimer (population 10,551): St Mary the Virgin's Church (medieval)
- Benefice of Cranford, Grafton Underwood and Twywell
  - Parish of Cranford (population 364)
    - St John the Baptist's Church, Cranford St John (medieval)
    - St Andrew's Church, Cranford St Andrew (medieval, parishes merged 1954, closed c. 1996)
  - Parish of Grafton Underwood (population 130): St James the Apostle's Church (medieval)
  - Parish of Twywell (population 202): St Nicholas' Church (medieval)
- Benefice of Desborough, Brampton Ash, Dingley and Braybrooke
  - Parish of Brampton Ash (population 85): St Mary the Virgin's Church (medieval)
  - Parish of Braybrooke (population 399): All Saints' Church (medieval)
  - Parish of Desborough (population 11,902): St Giles' Local Ecumenical Partnership (medieval)
  - Parish of Dingley (population 183): All Saints' Church (medieval)
- Benefice of Geddington with Weekley
  - Parish of Geddington (population 1,560)
    - St Mary Magdalene's Church (medieval)
    - St Faith's Church, Little Newton (medieval, closed 1973)
    - St Leonard's Chapel, Great Newton (medieval, abandoned C16th)
  - Parish of Weekley (population 226): St Mary the Virgin's Church (medieval)
- Benefice and Parish of Kettering All Saints (population 9,987): All Saints' Church (1898, parish church 1916, rebuilt 1928)
- Benefice and Parish of Kettering Christ the King (population 6,281): Church of Christ the King (1969, building 1987)
- Benefice and Parish of Kettering St Andrew (population 6,637): St Andrew's Church (1869, parish church 1916)
- Benefice and Parish of Kettering St Mary (population 10,848)
  - St Mary the Virgin's Church (1895, parish church 1916)
  - St John the Evangelist's Church (C19th/20th)
- Benefice and Parish of Kettering SS Peter & Paul (population 20,719)
  - SS Peter & Paul's Church (medieval)
  - St Michael & All Angels' Church (1908)
- Benefice and Parish of Slipton (population 46): St John the Baptist's Church (medieval)
- Benefice of Tresham (population 9,881)
  - Parish of Loddington (population 441): St Leonard's Church (medieval)
  - Parish of Rothwell with Orton (population 8,659)
    - Holy Trinity Church, Rothwell (medieval)
    - All Saints' Church, Orton (medieval, closed 1966)
  - Parish of Rushton with Glendon and Pipewell (population 640)
    - All Saints' Church, Rushton (medieval)
    - St Mary's Chapel, Pipewell (1881)
    - St Helen's Church, Glendon (medieval, closed c. 1500, demolished C18th, parishes merged 1923)
    - St Peter's Church, Rushton (medieval, parishes merged late C16th, demolished 1799)
    - St Mary's Church, Pipewell (medieval, rebuilt 1311, demolished C16th)
    - St Martin's Chapel, Barford (demolished C17th)
  - Parish of Thorpe Malsor (population 141): All Saints or St Leonard's Church (medieval)

==== Deanery of Oundle ====
- Benefice of Seven Churches
  - Parish of Aldwincle (population 336)
    - St Peter's Church (medieval)
    - All Saints' Church (medieval, parishes merged 1879, closed 1976)
  - Parish of Clopton (population 138): St Peter's Church (medieval, rebuilt 1863)
  - Parish of Pilton (population 55): All Saints' & St Mary's Church (medieval)
  - Parish of Stoke Doyle (population 83): St Rumbold's Church (medieval, rebuilt 1725)
  - Parish of Thorpe Achurch (population 306)
    - St John the Baptist's Church (medieval)
    - St Peter's Church, Lilford (medieval, parishes merged 1778, demolished 1788)
  - Parish of Titchmarsh (population 617): St Mary the Virgin's Church (medieval)
  - Parish of Wadenhoe (population 106): St Michael & All Angels' Church (medieval)
- Benefice of Barnwell, Hemington, Luddington in the Brook, Lutton, Polebrook and Thurning
  - Parish of Barnwell (population 387)
    - St Andrew's Church (medieval)
    - All Saints' Church (medieval, parishes merged 1821)
  - Parish of Hemington (population 94): SS Peter & Paul's Church (medieval, rebuilt except tower 1666)
  - Parish of Luddington-in-the-Brook (population 63): St Margaret's Church (medieval)
  - Parish of Lutton (population 212)
    - St Peter's Church (medieval)
    - Washingley Parish Church (medieval, closed C15th)
  - Parish of Polebrook (population 441): All Saints' Church (medieval)
  - Parish of Thurning (population 111): St James the Great's Church (medieval, in Huntingdonshire until 1888)
- Benefice of King's Cliffe
  - Parish of Bulwick and Blatherwycke (population 202)
    - St Nicholas' Church, Bulwick (medieval)
    - Holy Trinity Church, Blatherwycke (closed 1976)
    - St Mary Magdalene's Church, Blatherwycke (closed 1448)
  - Parish of Collyweston (population 553): St Andrew's Church (medieval)
  - Parish of Easton-on-the-Hill (population 1,105): All Saints' Church (medieval)
  - Parish of King's Cliffe (population 1,576): All Saints' Church (medieval)
  - Parish of Laxton (population 197): All Saints' Church (medieval)
- Benefice of Oundle with Ashton and Benefield with Glapthorn
  - Parish of Benefield (population 387): St Mary the Virgin's Church (medieval)
  - Parish of Glapthorn (population 309): St Leonard's Church (medieval, parish church 1922)
  - Parish of Oundle with Ashton (population 6,441)
    - St Peter's Church, Oundle (medieval)
    - St Mary Magdalene's Chapel, Ashton (1706, closed)
    - Churchfield Chapel (medieval, closed Middle Ages)
- Benefice of Thrapston, Denford and Islip
  - Parish of Denford (population 285): Holy Trinity Church (medieval)
  - Parish of Thrapston and Islip (population 8,043)
    - St James's Church, Thrapston (medieval)
    - St Nicholas' Church, Islip (medieval)
- Benefice of Warmington
  - Parish of Cotterstock (population 157): St Andrew's Church (medieval)
  - Parish of Fotheringhay (population 119): St Mary the Virgin & All Saints' Church (medieval)
  - Parish of Southwick (population 177): St Mary the Virgin's Church (medieval)
  - Parish of Tansor (population 203): St Mary's Church (medieval)
  - Parish of Warmington (population 1,048): St Mary the Blessed Virgin's Church (medieval)
- Benefice of Watersmete
  - Parish of Apethorpe (population 145)
    - St Leonard's Church (medieval chapel to Nassington)
    - St Nicholas' Church, Hale (medieval, abandoned C14th)
  - Parish of Nassington (population 868): St Mary the Virgin & All Saints' Church (medieval)
  - Parish of Thornhaugh and Wansford (population 810)
    - St Andrew's Church, Thornhaugh (medieval)
    - St Mary the Virgin's Church, Wansford (medieval)
    - Sibberton Church (medieval, abandoned C15th)
  - Parish of Woodnewton (population 463): St Mary's Church (medieval chapel to Nassington)
  - Parish of Yarwell (population 507): St Mary Magdalene's Church (medieval)

==== Deanery of Peterborough ====
- Benefice of Barnack and District
  - Parish of Bainton (population 329): St Mary's Church (medieval)
  - Parish of Barnack with Ufford (population 1,540)
    - St John the Baptist's Church, Barnack (medieval)
    - St Andrew's Church, Ufford (medieval, closed 2014)
  - Parish of Helpston (population 1,257): St Botolph's Church (medieval)
  - Parish of Wittering (population 2,671): All Saints' Church (medieval)
- Benefice of Castor
  - Parish of Castor with Upton and Stibbington and Water Newton (population 2,114)
    - St Kyneburgha's Church, Castor (medieval)
    - St John the Baptist's Church, Upton (medieval chapel to Castor)
    - St John the Baptist's Church, Stibbington (medieval)
    - St Remigius' Church, Water Newton (medieval)
    - Sibson Parish Church (medieval, abandoned C13th)
  - Parish of Marholm (population 151): St Mary the Virgin's Church (medieval)
  - Parish of Sutton (population 132): St Michael & All Angels' Church (medieval chapel to Castor)
- Benefice of Eye, Newborough and Thorney
  - Parish of Eye (population 5,557): St Matthew's Church (medieval, rebuilt 1857)
  - Parish of Newborough (population 1,879): St Bartholomew's Church (1830)
  - Parish of Thorney (population 2,665): SS Mary & Botolph's Abbey Church (medieval)
- Benefice and Parish of Longthorpe (population 3,373): St Botolph's Church (medieval, parish church 1850)
- Benefice of Nine Bridges
  - Parish of Etton (population 136): St Stephen's Church (medieval)
  - Parish of Glinton (population 1,747): St Benedict's Church (medieval, parish church 1865)
  - Parish of Maxey (population 1,224): St Peter's Church (medieval)
  - Parish of Northborough (population 1,333): St Andrew's Church (medieval)
  - Parish of Peakirk (population 485): St Pega's Church (medieval)
- Benefice and Parish of Paston (population 18,252): All Saints' Church (medieval)
- Benefice and Parish of Peterborough All Saints (population 9,947): All Saints' Church (1891)
- Benefice and Parish of Peterborough Bretton (population 13,573): Church of the Holy Spirit, Bretton, Peterborough (1977)
- Benefice and Parish of Peterborough Christ the Carpenter (population 11,532): Church of Christ the Carpenter, Dogsthorpe, Peterborough (1950, building 1957, parish church 1973)
- Benefice and Parish of Peterborough St John the Baptist (population 7,796)
  - St John the Baptist's New Church (1407)
  - St Luke's Church (1901)
- Benefice and Parish of Peterborough St Jude (population 9,035): St Jude's Church (1964, parish church 1969)
- Benefice and Parish of Peterborough St Mark (population 9,053)
  - St Mark's Church (1856, parish church 1858)
  - St Barnabas' Church (1899, parish church 1933, closed C20th)
- Benefice and Parish of Peterborough: St Mary (population 16,491)
  - St Mary's Church, Boongate, Peterborough (parish created 1857, built 1860, rebuilt 1990–91)
  - St James' Mission Chapel, Eastgate, Peterborough (1884, closed 1960s)
  - St Michael's Mission Chapel, Newark, Peterborough (1872, demolished 1980)
  - St John the Baptist's Old Church (medieval, demolished 1402)
- Benefice and Parish of Peterborough St Paul (population 8,649): St Paul's Church, New England, Peterborough (1869)
- Benefice and Parish of Werrington (population 12,127)
  - St John the Baptist's Church (medieval chapel to Paston, parish church 1877)
  - Emmanuel Church (1987)

=== Deanery of Rutland ===
- Benefice of Cottesmore
  - Parish of Clipsham (population 130): St Mary's Church (medieval)
  - Parish of Cottesmore and Burley with Thistleton (population 3,429)
    - St Nicholas' Church, Cottesmore (medieval)
    - St Nicholas' Church, Thistleton (medieval, rebuilt except tower 1879, parishes merged 2017)
    - Holy Cross Church, Burley (medieval, closed 1976)
    - Barrow Chapel (medieval, closed)
  - Parish of Exton with Horn (population 585)
    - SS Peter & Paul's Church, Exton (medieval)
    - All Saints' Church, Horn (medieval, ruined C15th)
  - Parish of Greetham (population 848): St Mary the Virgin's Church (medieval)
  - Parish of Stretton (population 1,325): St Nicholas' Church (medieval)
- Benefice of Great Casterton and Tickencote and Little Casterton with Pickworth
  - Parish of Great Casterton and Tickencote (population 1,592)
    - SS Peter & Paul's Church (medieval)
    - St Peter's Church, Tickencote (medieval, rebuilt 1792, closed 2019)
  - Parish of Little Casterton (population 284): All Saints' Church (medieval)
  - Parish of Pickworth (population 73)
    - All Saints' New Church (1821)
    - All Saints' Old Church (medieval, abandoned C15th-17th)
- Benefice of Gwash and Glen
  - Parish of Carlby (population 526): St Stephen's Church (medieval)
  - Parish of Essendine (population 453): St Mary Magdalene's Church (medieval)
  - Parish of Ryhall (population 1,646): St John the Evangelist's Church (medieval)
- Benefice of Ketton and Tinwell
  - Parish of Ketton (population 1,945): St Mary the Virgin's Church (medieval)
  - Parish of Tinwell (population 809): All Saints' Church (medieval)
- Benefice of Lyddington
  - Parish of Bisbrooke (population 214): St John the Baptist's Church (medieval, rebuilt 1871)
  - Parish of Caldecott (population 268): St John the Evangelist's Church (medieval)
  - Parish of Glaston (population 194): St Andrew's Church (medieval)
  - Parish of Harringworth (population 231): St John the Baptist's Church (medieval)
  - Parish of Lyddington (population 396): St Andrew's Church (medieval)
  - Parish of Seaton (population 262): All Hallows' Church (medieval)
  - Parish of Stoke Dry (population 39): St Andrew's Church (medieval)
- Benefice of Oakham
  - Parish of Ashwell (population 246): St Mary's Church (medieval)
  - Parish of Braunston (population 394): All Saints' Church (medieval)
  - Parish of Brooke (population 63): St Peter's Church (medieval)
  - Parish of Egleton (population 90): St Edmund's Church (medieval)
  - Parish of Hambleton (population 141): St Andrew's Church (medieval)
  - Parish of Langham (population 3,737)
    - SS Peter & Paul's Church (medieval)
    - St Peter's Chapel, Barleythorpe (medieval, closed)
  - Parish of Market Overton (population 500): SS Peter & Paul's Church (medieval)
  - Parish of Oakham (population 11,146): All Saints' Church (medieval)
  - Parish of Teigh (population 61): Holy Trinity Church (medieval, rebuilt 1782)
  - Parish of Whissendine (population 1,257): St Andrew's Church (medieval)
- Benefice of Rutland Water
  - Parish of Edith Weston (population 1,082)
    - St Mary the Virgin's Church (medieval)
    - St Matthew's Church, Normanton (medieval, rebuilt 1764/1829, closed and partially flooded 1970)
  - Parish of Empingham (population 948): St Peter's Church (medieval)
  - Parish of Lyndon (population 90): St Martin's Church (medieval)
  - Parish of Manton (population 372)
    - St Mary the Virgin's Church (medieval)
    - St Martin's Church, Martinsthorpe (medieval, abandoned C16th–17th)
    - Gunthorpe Chapel (medieval, closed Middle Ages)
  - Parish of North Luffenham (population 744): St John the Baptist's Church (medieval)
  - Parish of Pilton (population 28): St Nicholas' Church (medieval)
  - Parish of Preston (population 194): SS Peter & Paul's Church (medieval)
  - Parish of Ridlington (population 181): SS Mary Magdalene & Andrew's Church (medieval)
  - Parish of Whitwell (population 61): St Michael & All Angels' Church (medieval)
  - Parish of Wing (population 315): SS Peter & Paul's Church (medieval)
- Benefice of Uppingham
  - Parish of Belton with Wardley (population 403)
    - St Peter's Church, Belton-in-Rutland (medieval)
    - St Botolph's Church, Wardley (medieval, closed 2010)
  - Parish of Uppingham with Ayston (population 4,771)
    - SS Peter & Paul's Church, Uppingham (medieval)
    - St Mary the Virgin's Church, Ayston (medieval, closed 2012)
- Benefice of Welland Fosse
  - Parish of Barrowden and Wakerley (population 581)
    - St Peter's Church, Barrowden (medieval)
    - St John the Baptist's Church, Wakerley (medieval, redundant 1972)
  - Parish of Duddington (population 161): St Mary's Church (medieval, parish church 1733)
  - Parish of Morcott (population 338): St Mary the Virgin's Church (medieval)
  - Parish of South Luffenham (population 461): St Mary the Virgin's Church (medieval)
  - Parish of Tixover (population 160): St Luke's Church (medieval)

== Progression of church numbers ==
Period	Additions	Closures	Total at end
Medieval	[391 medieval churches]		391
C13th		Sibson	390
C14th		Chapel Brampton?, Churchfield?, Gunthorpe?, Hale, Onley?, Northampton St Thomas?	384
C15th		Blatherwycke St Mary Magdalene, Elkington, Glendon, Horn, Northampton St Bartholomew, Northampton St Martin, Sibberton, Sulby, Washingley	375
Reformation/C16th	Peterborough Cathedral	Barleythorpe?, Barrow?, Great Newton, Hartwell, Irthlingborough All SS, Maidwell St Peter, Nobold, Northampton St Edmund, Northampton St Gregory, Northampton St Katherine, Northampton St Margaret, Northampton St Mary, Northampton St Michael, Pipewell, Shutlanger, Stuchbury, Thrupp, Upper Catesby, Walton	357
C17th	Lower Catesby	Barford, Halse, Kirby, Martinsthorpe, Pickworth, Wick Hamon	352
C18th	Ashton	Boughton Old, Lilford, Rushton St Peter	350
1820s	Pickworth		351
1830s	Daventry St James, Newborough, Northampton St Katherine	Brackley St James	353
1840s	Hollowell, Northampton St Andrew		355
1850s	Deanshanger, Hartwell, Little Brington, Northampton St Edmund, Peterborough St Mark, Upper Stowe		361
1860s	Kettering St Andrew, Northampton St James, Peterborough St Mary, Peterborough St Paul, Wellingborough All SS, Yardley Gobion		367
1870s	Long Buckby Wharf, Northampton St Lawrence, Northampton St Mary, Northampton St Paul, Peterborough St Michael, Wellingborough St Barnabas		373
1880s	New Duston, Northampton St Crispin, Northampton St Michael, Peterborough St James, Pipewell, Shutlanger		379
1890s	Caldecote?, Kettering All SS, Kettering St Mary, Northampton St Gabriel, Northampton St Matthew, Peterborough All SS, Peterborough St Barnabas		386
1900s	Halse, Kettering St John?, Kettering St Michael, Northampton Christ Ch, Peterborough St Luke, Rushden St Peter, Wellingborough St Mary		393
1910s	Northampton Trinity		394
1920s		Northampton St Crispin, Northampton St Gabriel	392
1930s	Northampton St Alban, Wellingborough St Andrew	Canons Ashby?, Faxton	392
1940s	Corby St Columba, Northampton St David	Little Brington	393
1950s	Northampton St Augustine, Peterborough Christ the Carpenter	Ashton?, Clay Coton, Deene?, Northampton St Katherine, Plumpton?	390
1960s	Corby SS Peter & Andrew, Kettering Christ the King, Northampton St Francis, Northampton St Mark, Peterborough St Jude, Wellingborough St Mark	Daventry St James, Long Buckby Wharf, New Duston?, Orton, Peterborough St James	391
1970s	Corby Epiphany?, Corby Kingswood?, Northampton Emmanuel, Peterborough Holy Spirit	Aldwincle All SS, Holdenby, Blatherwycke Trinity, Burley, Little Newton, Little Oakley, Normanton, Northampton St Andrew, Northampton St Lawrence?, Northampton St Paul?, Preston Deanery, Wakerley	383
1980s	Northampton St Benedict, Peterborough Emmanuel	Furtho, Northampton St Edmund, Peterborough St Michael, Upton	381
1990s	Northampton Boothville, Northampton Rectory Farm, Rushden Whitefriars, Wellingborough North	Cranford St Andrew, Northampton St Peter	383
2000s	Northampton Grange Park	Corby Kingswood?	383
2010s	Mawsley	Ayston, Corby Epiphany, Horton, Tickencote, Ufford, Wardley	378
2020s	Northampton Upton		379

== Dedications ==
=== Medieval parish churches ===
Chapels are in italics. See also List of civil parishes in Northamptonshire#Medieval parishes.

- All Saints: Adstone, Aldwincle, Barnwell, Braunston, Braunston-in-Rutland, Braybrooke, Brixworth, Clipston, Cottesbrooke, Croughton, Dingley, Easton on the Hill, Flore, Great Addington, Great Harrowden, Hargrave, Harpole, Holdenby, Horn, Irthlingborough, Kings Cliffe, Lamport, Laxton, Lilbourne, Little Billing, Little Casterton, Mears Ashby, Middleton Cheney, Naseby, Northampton, Norton, Oakham, Orton, Paston, Pickworth, Pitsford, Polebrook, Pytchley, Rushton, Seaton, Sudborough, Sutton Bassett, Thorpe Malsor, Tinwell, Wellingborough, West Haddon, Wilbarston, Wittering, Yelvertoft
- Holy Cross: Burley, Byfield, Daventry, Milton Malsor, Pattishall
- Holy Sepulchre: Northampton
- Holy Trinity: Blatherwycke, Charwelton, Denford, Hinton in the Hedges, Rothwell, Teigh
- St Andrew: Arthingworth, Barnwell, Brigstock, Broughton, Clay Coton, Collyweston, Cotterstock, Cranford, Cransley, Earls Barton, Glaston, Great Billing, Hambleton, Harlestone, Lyddington, Northborough, Old, Spratton, Stoke Dry, Thornhaugh, Ufford, Whilton, Whissendine, Yardley Hastings
- St Anne: Shutlanger
- St Bartholomew: Furtho, Greens Norton, Northampton
- St Benedict: Glinton
- St Botolph: Barton Seagrave, Church Brampton, Helpston, Longthorpe, Slapton, Stoke Albany, Sulby, Wardley
- St Catherine: Draughton, Irchester, Northampton
- St Columba: Collingtree
- St Cyneburh: Castor
- St Denys: Cold Ashby, Faxton, Kelmarsh, Ravensthorpe
- St Edmund: Egleton, Hardingstone, Northampton, Warkton
- St Etheldreda: Guilsborough
- St Faith: Kilsby, Newton
- St George: Evenley, Wootton
- St Giles: Desborough, Northampton
- St Gregory: Northampton
- St Guthlac: Passenham
- St Helen: Glendon, Great Oxendon, Sibbertoft, Thornby
- St James: Brackley, Edgcote, Grafton Underwood, Gretton, Newbottle, Paulerspury, Syresham, Thrapston, Thurning, Wick Hamon
- St James the Less: Sulgrave
- St John the Baptist: Abthorpe, Barnack, Bisbrooke, Blisworth, Boughton, Chelveston-cum-Caldecott, Corby, Cranford, East Farndon, Harringworth, Hartwell, Hellidon, Kingsthorpe, North Luffenham, Peterborough, Piddington, Plumpton, Quinton, Slipton, Stibbington, Stuchbury, Thorpe Achurch, Thorpe Mandeville, Thrupp, Tiffield, Upper Boddington, Upton (Peterborough), Wakerley, Werrington
- St John the Evangelist: Caldecott (Rutland), Ryhall, Whitfield, Wicken
- St Lawrence: Brafield on the Green, Long Buckby, Marston St Lawrence, Radstone, Stanwick, Towcester
- St Leodegarius: Ashby St Ledgers
- St Leonard: Apethorpe, Aston le Walls, Glapthorn, Great Newton, Hardwick, Loddington, Rockingham
- St Luke: Cold Higham, Duston, Kislingbury, Tixover
- St Margaret: Alderton, Chapel Brampton, Crick, Denton, Luddington, Northampton
- St Martin: Barford, Litchborough, Lyndon, Northampton, [Stamford Baron], Welton
- St Mary: Ashley, Ashwell, Ayston, Badby, Bainton, Barby, Benefield, Blakesley, Bozeat, Brampton Ash, Brington, Burton Latimer, Canons Ashby, Catesby, Clipsham, Culworth, Dallington, Dodford, Duddington, East Haddon, Easton Neston, Edith Weston, Everdon, Farthinghoe, Fawsley, Finedon, Gayton, Grafton Regis, Great Houghton, Great Weldon, Greetham, Grendon, Halse, Higham Ferrers, Ketton, Little Addington, Little Harrowden, Little Houghton, Maidwell, Manton, Marholm, Morcott, Moreton Pinkney, Northampton, Orlingbury, Pipewell, Raunds, Ringstead, Roade, Rushden, South Luffenham, Southwick, Staverton, Stoke Bruerne, Tansor, Thenford, Titchmarsh, Wansford, Wappenham, Warkworth, Warmington, Weekley, Welford, Weston by Welland, Whiston, Whittlebury, Wilby, Wollaston, Woodford, Woodford Halse, Woodnewton
- St Mary & All Saints: Fotheringhay, Holcot, Nassington, Pilton (Northants)
- SS Mary & Botolph: Thorney
- SS Mary & Peter: Weedon Lois
- St Mary Magdalene: Blathewycke, Castle Ashby, Cottingham, Ecton, Essendine, Geddington, Helmdon, Horton, Yarwell
- SS Mary Magdalene & Andrew: Ridlington
- St Matthew: Eye, Normanton
- St Michael: Ashton, Aynho, Bradden, Bugbrooke, Farthinghoe, Great Creaton, Great Oakley, Haselbech, Newnham, Northampton, Silverstone, Stowe IX Churches, Sutton, Upton (Northampton), Wadenhoe, Whitwell, Winwick (Northants)
- St Nicholas: Bulwick, Cottesmore, Eydon, Great Doddington, Hale, Islip, [Little Bowden], Marston Trussell, Overstone, Pilton (Rutland), Potterspury, Stanford, Stretton, Thistleton, Twywell, Winwick (Cambs)
- St Pega: Peakirk
- St Peter: Aldwincle, Barrowden, Belton, Brackley, Brooke, Clopton, Cogenhoe, Deene, East Carlton, Empingham, Greatworth, Irthlingborough, Isham, Lilford, Little Oakley, Lowick, Lutton, Maidwell, Maxey, Newton Bromswold, Northampton, Oundle, Rushton, Stanion, Steane, Tickencote, Walgrave, Weston Favell
- SS Peter & Paul: Abington, Brockhall, Chalcombe, Chipping Warden, Cosgrove, Courteenhall, Easton Maudit, Exton, Great Casterton, Hannington, Harrington, Hemington, Kettering, Kings Sutton, Langham, Maidford, Market Overton, Moulton, Nether Heyford, Preston (Rutland), Preston Capes, Preston Deanery, Rothersthorpe, Scaldwell, Sywell, Uppingham, Watford, Weedon Bec, Wing
- St Remigius: Water Newton
- St Rumbald/Romwald: Stoke Doyle, Strixton, Walton
- St Stephen: Carlby (Lincs), Etton
- St Thomas: Northampton
- Dedication unknown/no dedication: Barrow, Churchfield, Elkington, Kirby, Nobold, Onley, Sibson, Washingley

=== Post-medieval churches ===
- All Saints: Kettering (1898), Peterborough (1891), Pickworth (1821), Wellingborough (1868)
- Christ Church: Northampton (1904)
- Christ the Carpenter: Peterborough (1950)
- Christ the King: Kettering (1969)
- Emmanuel: Northampton (1974), Werrington (1987)
- Epiphany: Corby (C20th)
- Grace Church: Upton (2021)
- Holy Spirit: Bretton (1977)
- Holy Trinity: Deanshanger (1853), Northampton (1910)
- St Alban: Northampton (1938)
- St Andrew: Kettering (1869), Northampton (1841), Wellingborough (1936)
- St Anne: Shutlanger (1885)
- St Augustine: Caldecote (C19th/20th), King's Heath (c. 1950)
- St Barnabas: New Duston (1887), Peterborough (1899), Wellingborough (1873)
- St Bartholomew: Newborough (1830)
- St Benedict: Northampton (1982)
- St Catherine: Northampton (1839)
- St Columba & the Northern Saints: Corby (1940)
- St Crispin: Northampton (1884)
- St David: Kingsthorpe (1940)
- St Edmund: Northampton (1850)
- St Francis: Duston (1968)
- St Gabriel: Northampton (1894)
- St James: Daventry (1839), Hollowell (1840), Northampton (1868), Peterborough (1884), Upper Stowe (1855)
- St John the Baptist: Hartwell (1851)
- St John the Evangelist: Kettering (C19th/20th), Little Brington (1855)
- St Jude: Peterborough (1964)
- St Lawrence: Northampton (1878)
- St Leonard: Yardley Gobion (1864)
- St Luke: Peterborough (1901)
- St Mark: Kingsthorpe (c. 1960), Peterborough (1856), Wellingborough (1960s)
- St Mary: Far Cotton (1875), Kettering (1893), Peterborough (1860), Pipewell (1881), Wellingborough (1908)
- SS Mary & Edmund: Catesby (C17th)
- St Mary Magdalene: Ashton (1706)
- St Matthew: Northampton (1893)
- St Michael: Kettering (1908), Northampton (1881), Peterborough (1872)
- St Nicholas: Overstone (1807)
- St Paul: Northampton (1877), Peterborough (1869)
- St Peter: Rushden (1907)
- SS Peter & Andrew: Corby (1961)
- Dedication unknown/no dedication: Corby Kingswood (C20th), Grange Park (c. 2000), Halse (1900), King's Heath (2007), Long Buckby Wharf (1875), Mawsley (C21st), Rushden (1992), Wellingborough (1990)

== Benefices by population ==
Benefice	Population	Churches	Clergy (Oct 2025)
Corby SS Peter & Andrew // Great and Little Oakley	31,579	2	1 Joint Priest-in-Charge
Kettering SS Peter & Paul // Kettering All Saints	30,706	3	Vacant, 1 Joint Curate, 1 Joint NSM
Northampton Emmanuel	29,995	3	1 Team Rector, 1 Curate, 1 Hon. Curate
Daventry	28,104	1	1 Rector
Northampton Duston and Upton	26,035	3	1 Team Rector
Northampton Kingsthorpe	23,929	3	1 Team Rector, 1 Team Vicar, 1 NSM
Northampton St Benedict	19,176	1	1 Vicar
Corby St Columba and the Northern Saints	18,667	1	1 Vicar
Peterborough Paston	18,252	1	1 Rector, 1 NSM
Oakham	17,635	10	2 Team Vicars, 1 NSM
Northampton Christ Church St Michael	16,513	2	1 Vicar, 2.5 NSMs
Peterborough St Mary	16,491	1	1 Vicar
Brackley	16,326	2	1 Vicar, 1 Curate
Northampton St Mary // Living Brook	16,317	4	1 Joint Vicar/Priest-in-Charge, 1 Joint Hon. Curate, 1 Hon. Curate
Wellingborough All Hallows // Wellingborough All SS	15,905	2	1 Joint Vicar, 1 Joint Curate
Corby St John // Gretton, Rockingh, Cottingh, E Carlton	15,432	5	1 Joint Rector/Priest-in-Charge, 1 Joint Curate
Northampton Billing	15,261	2	1 Rector
Northampton Wootton	14,550	2	1 Priest-in-Charge, 1 Curate, 1 Minister
Four Spires	14,027	4	1 Rector
Northampton Dallington and St James	13,783	2	1 Vicar
Peterborough Bretton	13,573	1	1 Vicar
Tove	13,393	5	1 Vicar, 2 Curates
Wellingborough St Andrew St Barnabas	12,885	2	1 Vicar, 1 NSM
Desborough, Brampton Ash, Dingley and Braybrooke	12,569	4	1 Rector, 1 Curate
Peterborough Werrington	12,127	2	1 Vicar, 2 Curates, 1 NSM
Nene Crossings	12,082	4	1 Rector, 2 Curates
Northampton St Alban	11,882	1	Vacant, 1 Curate
Peterborough Christ the Carpenter	11,532	1	1 Vicar
Rushden St Mary with Newton Bromswold	11,456	2	1 Rector, 1 Hon. Curate
Kettering St Mary (under Bishop of Richborough)	10,848	2	1 Priest-in-Charge
Rushden Whitefriars	10,783	1	Vacant
Burton Latimer	10,551	1	1 Rector
Northampton Holy Trinity and St Paul	10,371	1	1 Vicar, 0.5 NSM
Eye, Newborough and Thorney	10,101	3	1 Vicar
Peterborough All Saints	9,947	1	1 Vicar
Tresham	9,881	5	1 Rector
Wellingborough St Mark	9,507	1	Vacant
Higham Ferrers and Chelveston	9,454	2	1 Vicar
Rushden St Peter	9,387	1	Vacant
Northampton All Saints Holy Sepulchre (AS is B of R)	9,067	2	1 Rector, 1 Curate
Peterborough St Mark	9,053	1	1 Priest-in-Charge
Peterborough St Jude	9,035	1	1 Priest-in-Charge, 1 Hon. Curate
Barton Seagrave with Warkton (Bishop of Ebbsfleet)	8,737	2	1 Rector, 1 Curate
Salcey	8,660	5	1 Priest-in-Charge
Peterborough St Paul	8,649	1	1 Vicar
Thrapston, Denford and Islip	8,328	3	1 Rector, 1 Curate
Northampton Weston Favell	8,089	1	1 Rector, 3 NSMs
Bugbrooke, Harpole, Kislingbury & Rothersthorpe	7,923	4	Vacant
Peterborough St John the Baptist	7,796	2	1 Vicar, 2 Curates
Moulton (under Bishop of Ebbsfleet)	7,779	1	1 Vicar, 1 Curate
Northampton Abington	7,667	1	1 Rector, 1 Curate
Northampton St Matthew	7,635	1	1 Vicar
Oundle with Ashton and Benefield with Glapthorn	7,137	3	1 Rector, 1 Curate
Five Ways	7,040	5	1 Rector
Weldon with Deene	7,005	1	1 Rector, 1 Curate, 1 NSM
Long Buckby w Watford & West Haddon w Winwick	6,899	4	1 Vicar
Kettering St Andrew	6,637	1	1 Vicar, 1 Curate
Chenderit	6,631	8	1 Rector
Passenham with Old Stratford with Deanshanger	6,542	2	1 Rector
Wellingborough North	6,525	1	1 Vicar, 2 Curates
Wellingborough St Mary the Virgin (Bp of Richborough)	6,366	1	1 Vicar
Earls Barton	6,361	1	1 Vicar, 1 NSM
Cottesmore	6,317	6	1 Vicar, 1 Curate
Kettering Christ the King	6,281	1	Vacant, 1 Curate
Brixworth with Holcot	6,181	2	1 Vicar
Barnack and District	5,797	4	1 Vicar
Wollaston with Strixton & Bozeat & Easton Maudit	5,749	4	Vacant, 1 Curate
Uppingham	5,174	2	Vacant
Broughton with Cransley and Mawsley	5,091	3	1 Rector, 1 Curate
Harpers Brook	4,992	4	1 Rector
Whittlewood	4,946	5	1 Rector
Nine Bridges	4,925	5	1 Vicar
Irchester with Stanton Cross	4,911	1	1 Vicar
Northampton King's Heath	4,726	1	1 Vicar
Northampton St Giles	4,603	1	1 Vicar
Finedon	4,536	1	1 Vicar
Great Doddington and Wilby and Ecton	4,183	3	1 Rector
Uplands	4,165	8	1 Rector, 2 Curates, 2 NSMs
Rutland Water	4,015	10	Vacant
South Cleley	3,922	4	Vacant (since 2020)
Spencer	3,857	6	1 Rector, 1 Curate, 1 NSM
Crick & Yelvertoft w Clay Coton & Lilbourne	3,772	3	Vacant
The Harrowdens & Orlingbury & Isham with Pytchley	3,762	5	Vacant
King's Cliffe	3,633	5	1 Vicar
Grand Union	3,603	6	1 Rector, 1 NSM
Heyford w Stowe IX Churches & Flore w Brockhall	3,513	5	1 Rector
Naseby	3,509	7	1 Rector, 1 NSM
Weedon Bec with Everdon and Dodford	3,418	3	Vacant
Peterborough Longthorpe	3,373	1	1 Vicar, 1 Curate
Wymersley	3,202	4	1 Rector, 1 NSM
Astwick Vale	3,048	6	1 Rector
Pitsford with Boughton	3,022	2	1 Rector
King's Sutton, Newbottle, Charlton (Bp of Richborough)	2,858	2	1 Vicar
Watersmete	2,793	6	1 Vicar
Ketton and Tinwell	2,754	2	Vacant
Astwell	2,689	6	1 Rector
Mears Ashby	2,723	4	1 Rector
Amelcote	2,652	4	1 Rector
Gwash and Glen	2,625	3	Vacant (since 2022)
Braunston, Ashby St Ledgers and Welton	2,566	3	1 Rector
Barby and Kilsby	2,417	2	1 Rector
Castor	2,397	6	Vacant, 1 Curate
Yardley Hastings	2,212	5	Vacant
Walgrave	1,970	4	1 Rector
Great and Little Casterton, Tickencote and Pickworth	1,949	3	1 Priest-in-Charge
Geddington with Weekley	1,786	2	1 Priest-in-Charge, 1 NSM
Knightley	1,741	5	Vacant
Warmington	1,704	5	1 Vicar
Welland Fosse	1,701	5	1 Rector
Faxton	1,693	7	1 Curate
Seven Churches	1,641	7	Vacant (since 2021)
Lyddington	1,604	7	1 Vicar
Stoke Albany, Wilbarston, Ashley, Weston-by-W, Sutton B	1,536	5	1 Priest-in-Charge, 1 Curate (both also Curates in Gretton benef.)
Lambfold	1,522	5	1 Rector
Culworth	1,406	4	Vacant
Barnwell, Hemingt, Luddingt, Lutton, Polebrook, Thurning	1,308	7	Vacant (since 2022)
Staverton, Hellidon and Catesby	743	3	1 Rector
Cranford, Grafton Underwood and Twywell // Slipton	742	4	1 Joint Priest-in-Charge
[Peterborough Cathedral	246	1	1 Dean, 2 Canons Residentiary]

There are a total of 118 benefices (counting multiple benefices held simultaneously by the same cleric as one).

== Deaneries by population ==
Deanery	Population	Churches	Clergy (Oct 2025)	Popn. per stip. cl.
Greater Northampton	247,378	32	7 Rectors, 10 Vicars, 1 P-in-Ch, 1 Minister, 6 Curates, 7 NSMs, 3 Hon. Curates	9,895
Peterborough	143,048	31	1 Rector, 11 Vicars, 2 Priests-in-Charge, 6 Curates, 2 NSMs, 1 Hon. Curate	7,152
Kettering	103,829	28	5 Rectors, 1 Vicar, 3 Priests-in-Charge, 6 Curates, 2 NSMs	6,922
Wellingborough	84,291	34	3 Rectors, 6 Vicars, 4 Curates, 3 NSMs	6,484
Corby	79,211	18	3 Rectors, 1 Vicar, 2 Priests-in-Charge, 3 Curates, 1 NSM	8,801
Higham	71,725	16	3 Rectors, 2 Vicars, 2 Curates, 1 Hon. Curate	10,246
Daventry	50,433	26	5 Rectors	10,087
Towcester	45,240	36	5 Rectors, 1 Vicar, 1 Priest-in-Charge, 2 Curates, 1 NSM	5,027
Rutland	43,774	48	1 Rector, 4 Vicars, 1 Priest-in-Charge, 1 Curate, 1 NSM	6,253
Brackley	39,998	33	4 Rectors, 2 Vicars, 1 Curate	5,714
Brixworth	35,068	43	5 Rectors, 2 Vicars, 4 Curates, 4 NSMs	3,188
Oundle	26,544	36	2 Rectors, 3 Vicars, 2 Curates	3,792
Totals	970,539	381	135 stipendiary clergy, 26 non-stipendiary	average: 7,189

== Archdeaconries by population ==
Archdeaconry	Population	Churches	Clergy (Nov 2025)	Popn. per stip. cl.
Northampton	502,408	204	70 stipendiary, 18 non-stipendiary	7,177
Oakham	468,131	177	65 stipendiary, 8 non-stipendiary	7,202

== See also ==
- Bishop of Peterborough
- Peterborough Cathedral
