= St Mary the Virgin's Church, Maidwell =

Church in Northamptonshire, England

Coordinates: 52.3853°N 0.9004°W

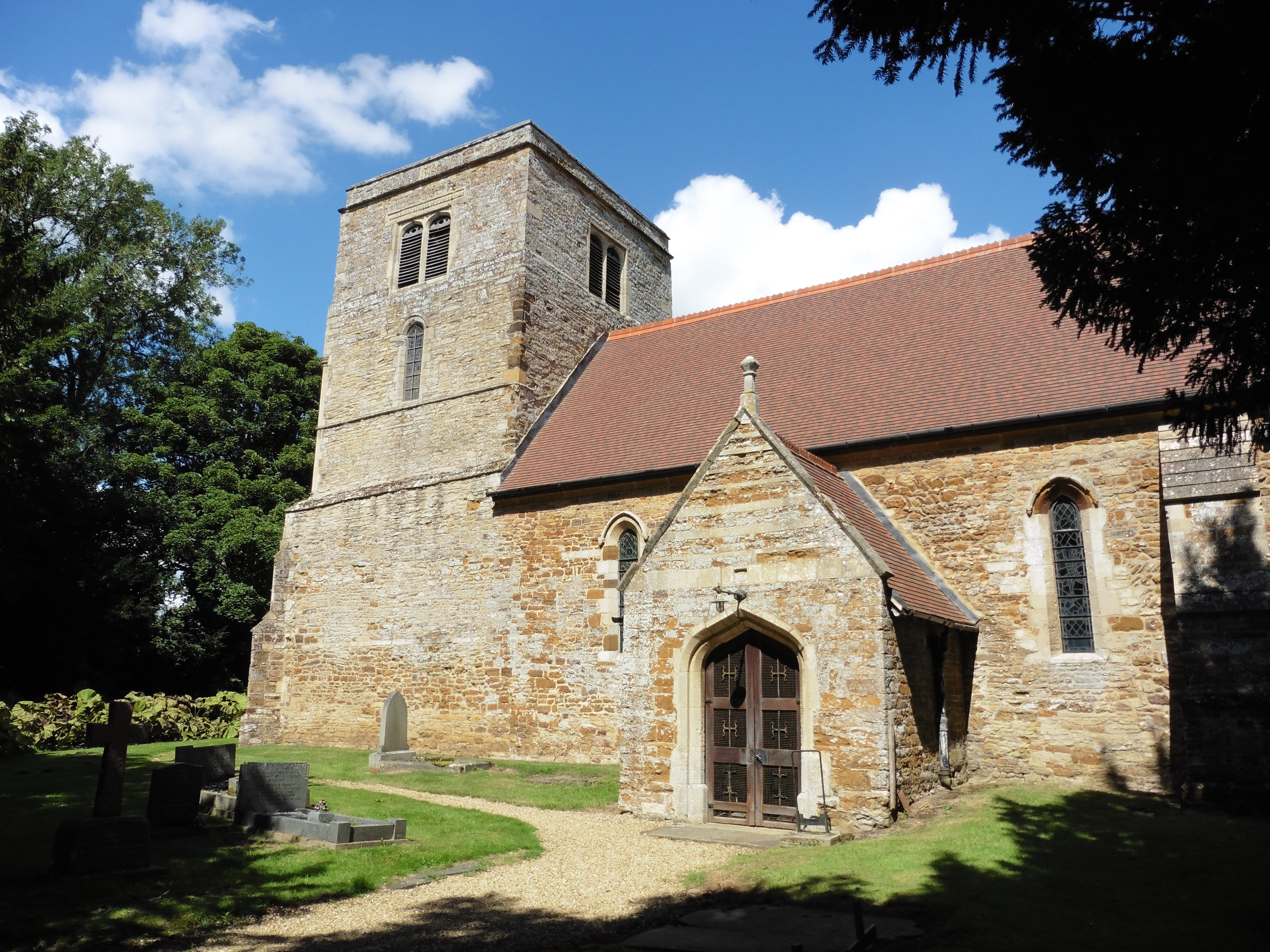
- St Mary the Virgin's Church, Maidwell
- Denomination: Church of England
- Website: http://www.faxtongroup.org.uk/stmarymaidwell.htm

Architecture
- Architect: James Piers St Aubyn (chancel)

Administration
- Province: Canterbury
- Diocese: Diocese of Peterborough
- Archdeaconry: Northampton
- Deanery: Brixworth

Clergy
- Rector: Rev Canon Mary Garbutt

St Mary the Virgin's Church is an Anglican Church and the parish church of Maidwell, Northamptonshire. It is a Grade II* listed building and stands on the south side of Draughton Road.

There is no reference to a church or priest in the entry for the parish in the Domesday Book, which was compiled in 1086. This may indicate the absence of a church building at that stage or, alternatively, only the absence of a resident priest.

The church consists of a nave, chancel and west tower. The main structure of the present building was erected in the 12th and 13th centuries. The oldest parts are the north and south doorway dating from the 12th century. The tower dates from the 13th century. The chancel was constructed in 1891 to a design by James Piers St Aubyn. There are monuments to Catherine, Lady Gorges (1634) erected by her husband Edward Gorges, Lord Dundalk and also a tablet to the Haslewood family erected 1695 by Elizabeth, Viscountess Hatton. A detailed description of the building appears on the Historic England website

A notable Rector was George Folbury (d. 1540) Master of Pembroke Hall, Cambridge from 1537.

The parish registers survive from 1708 and, apart from those currently in use, are kept at Northamptonshire Record Office. Details of its location and opening times can be found on the Record Office website.

Maidwell is part of a united Benefice along with Draughton, Faxton and Lamport. Except for Faxton, each parish retains its own church building.
