= St Catherine's Church, Draughton =

Church in Northamptonshire, England

Coordinates: 52.3841°N 0.8820°W

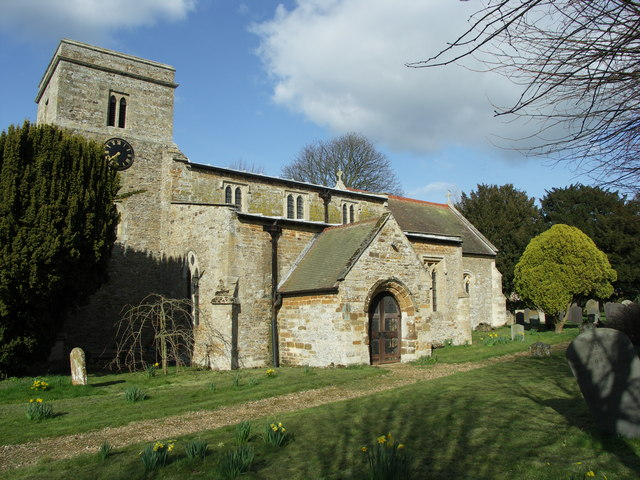
- St Catherine's Church, Draughton
- Denomination: Church of England
- Website: http://www.faxtongroup.org.uk/stcatherinesdraughton.htm

Administration
- Province: Canterbury
- Diocese: Diocese of Peterborough
- Archdeaconry: Northampton
- Deanery: Brixworth

Clergy
- Rector: Rev Canon Mary Garbutt

St Catherine's Church is an Anglican Church and the parish church of Draughton in Northamptonshire. It is a Grade II* listed building and stands in the village of Draughton.

There is no reference to a church or priest in the entry for the parish in the Domesday Book, which was compiled in 1086. This may indicate the absence of a church building at that stage or, alternatively, only the absence of a resident priest.

The main structure of the present building was erected in the 12th and 13th centuries. The chancel was remodelled in about 1885. The church consists of a nave, north and south aisles, chancel and west tower. A detailed description appears on the Historic England website

The parish registers survive from 1559 and, apart from those currently in use, are kept at Northamptonshire Record Office in Wootton, Northamptonshire. Details of its location and opening times can be found on the Record Office website.

Draughton is part of a united Benefice along with Faxton, Lamport, and Maidwell. Except for Faxton, each parish retains its own church building.
