= St John the Baptist's Church, Boughton =

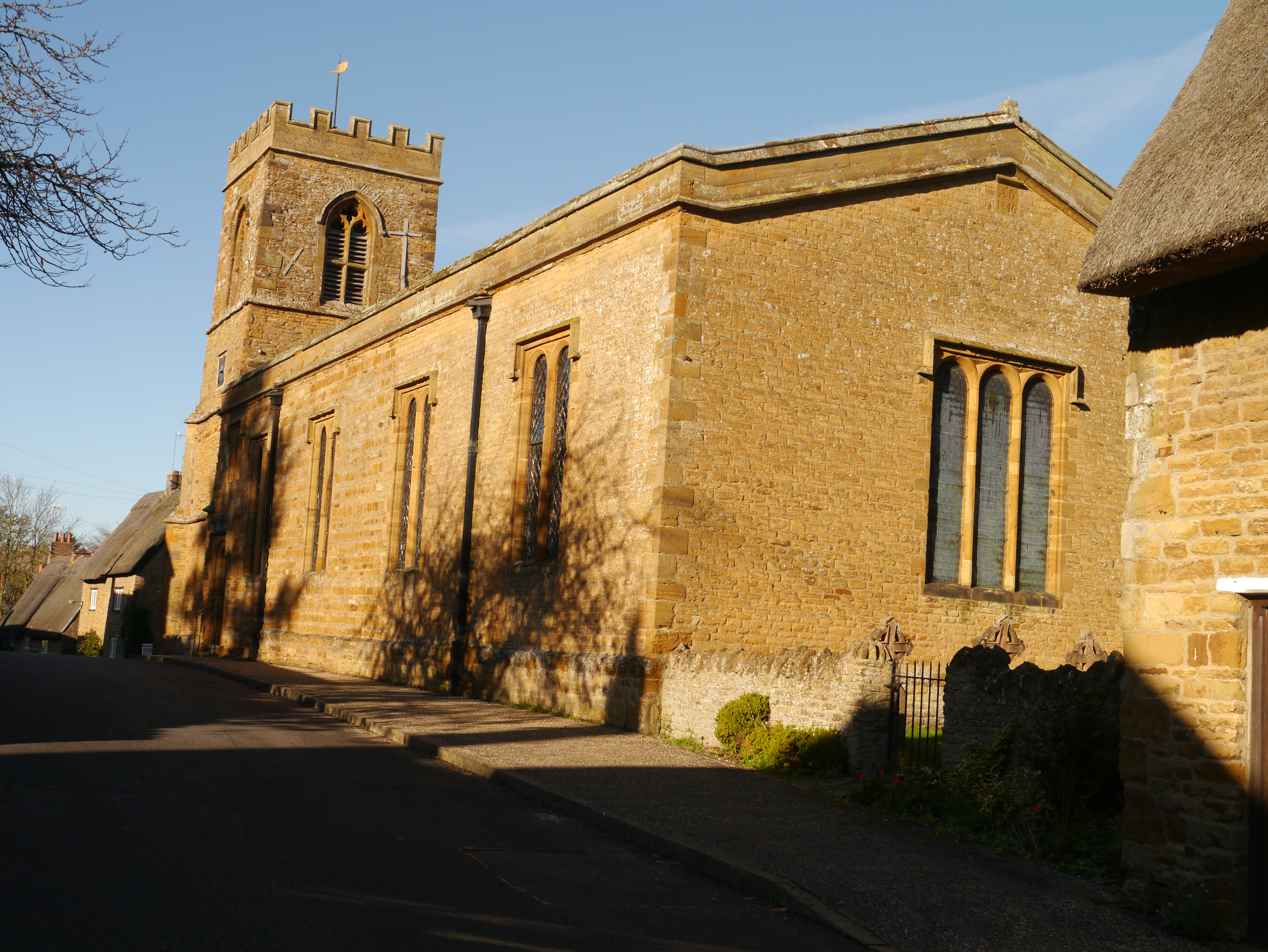
- St John the Baptist's Church, Boughton
- 52.2860°N 0.8972°W
- Denomination: Church of England
- Website: https://www.achurchnearyou.com/church/16441/

Administration
- Province: Canterbury
- Diocese: Diocese of Peterborough
- Archdeaconry: Northampton
- Deanery: Brixworth

Clergy
- Rector: Rev Stephen Trott

St John the Baptist's Church is an Anglican Church and the parish church of Boughton. It is a Grade II listed building and stands on the east side of Church Street.

There is no reference to a church or priest in the entry for Boughton in the Domesday Book.

There have been two churches in the parish of Boughton, both now dedicated to St John. The remains of a 14th-century building can be seen on a site to the north of the junction of Moulton Lane and Boughton Road, east of the outskirts of the village of Boughton. It was already in ruins by the early 18th century and the tower and spire collapsed about 1784.

The present-day parish church stands within the village. Before the Reformation it was a Chantry Chapel for Boughton Hall, dedicated to St Thomas the Martyr. Its tower dates from around 1400 but otherwise the building is the product of a series of developments that were carried out during the 19th century. It consists of a nave, chancel and west tower.

Detailed descriptions of both churches appear on the Historic England website and in the Victoria County History of Northamptonshire.

The parish registers survive from 1549, the historic registers being deposited at Northamptonshire Record Office.

Boughton is part of a united Benefice along with Pitsford. Each parish retains its own church building.
