= All Saints' Church, Pitsford =

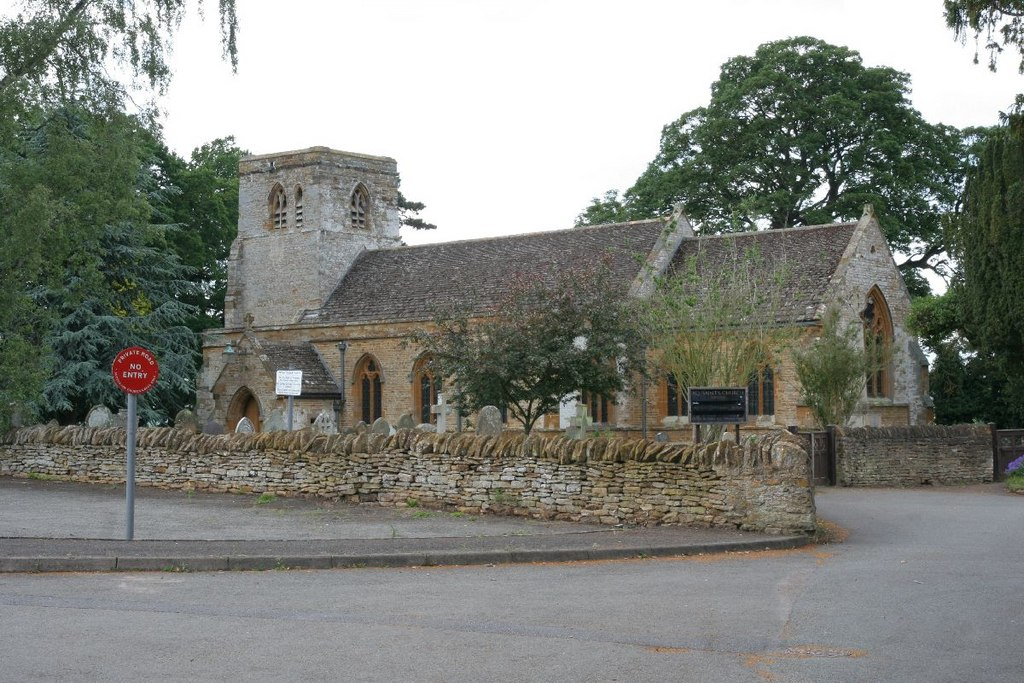
- All Saints' Church, Pitsford
- 52.3067°N 0.8952°W
- Location: Church Lane, Pitsford, Northamptonshire, NN6 9AJ
- Country: England
- Denomination: Church of England
- Website: https://www.achurchnearyou.com/church/16426/

History
- Status: Active

Architecture
- Functional status: Parish church
- Heritage designation: Grade II* listed

Administration
- Province: Province of Canterbury
- Diocese: Diocese of Peterborough
- Archdeaconry: Archdeaconry of Northampton
- Deanery: Brixworth
- Parish: Pitsford

Clergy
- Rector: The Rev Stephen Trott

All Saints' Church is an Anglican Church and the parish church of Pitsford, in the Diocese of Peterborough. It is a Grade II* listed building and stands on the west side of Church Lane on the northern edge of the village.

== History ==
There is no reference to a church or priest in the entry for Pitsford in the Domesday Book of 1086. Parts of the church date to the Norman Conquest, with the tympanum over the main church door dating to that period.

The main structure of the present building was erected in the 12th to 14th centuries. Restoration in 1867 included rebuilding of the south aisle, porch and chancel and extensive internal alterations. The church consists of a nave, north and south aisles, chancel and west tower. Detailed descriptions appear on the Historic England website and in the Victoria County History of Northamptonshire.

The Reverend Robert Skinner, who succeeded his father as Rector of Pitsford in 1628, was subsequently Bishop of Bristol (1636), Bishop of Oxford (1641) and following the Restoration became Bishop of Worcester in 1663.

The parish registers survive from 1560, the historic registers being deposited at Northamptonshire Record Office.

=== Present day ===
On 2 November 1954, the church was designated a Grade II* listed building. Pitsford is part of a united benefice along with Boughton. Each parish retains its own church building.
