= George Folbury =

George Folbury (also Folberry or Folbery) (died 1540) was an English churchman and academic, master of Pembroke Hall, Cambridge from 1537. His reputation as a poet, orator, and epigrammatist is supported only by contemporary report, and none of his works is known to have survived.

== Life ==
He was of the family of Fowbery, of Fowberry Tower, Chatton, Northumberland. He graduated BA at Cambridge in 1515, and MA in 1517, having become a Fellow of Clare Hall in 1515. He took the higher degrees of BD in 1524, and DD at some point in Montpellier, France.

He was preacher to the university in 1519, and was presented to a canonry and to the prebend of North Newbald in York Cathedral in March 1531. He was then presented to the rectory of Maidwell, Northamptonshire, on 20 February 1534. There is a long-standing theory that he was tutor to Henry FitzRoy, and Beverley Murphy in a recent biography of this illegitimate son of Henry VIII proposes that Folbury succeeded Richard Croke as tutor and remained until the boy was 12 in 1531, his subsequent preferment coming after this appointment which would have started in the late 1520s.

Folbury was elected master of Pembroke Hall in 1537, and died between 10 July and 10 November 1540. Among those taught by him was William Turner, elected Fellow of Pembroke in 1531.

== Notes ==
Academic offices
| Preceded by Robert Swinburn | Master of Pembroke College, Cambridge; 1537–1540 | Succeeded by Nicholas Ridley |
