= St Michael & All Angels' Church, Winwick =

Church in Northamptonshire, England

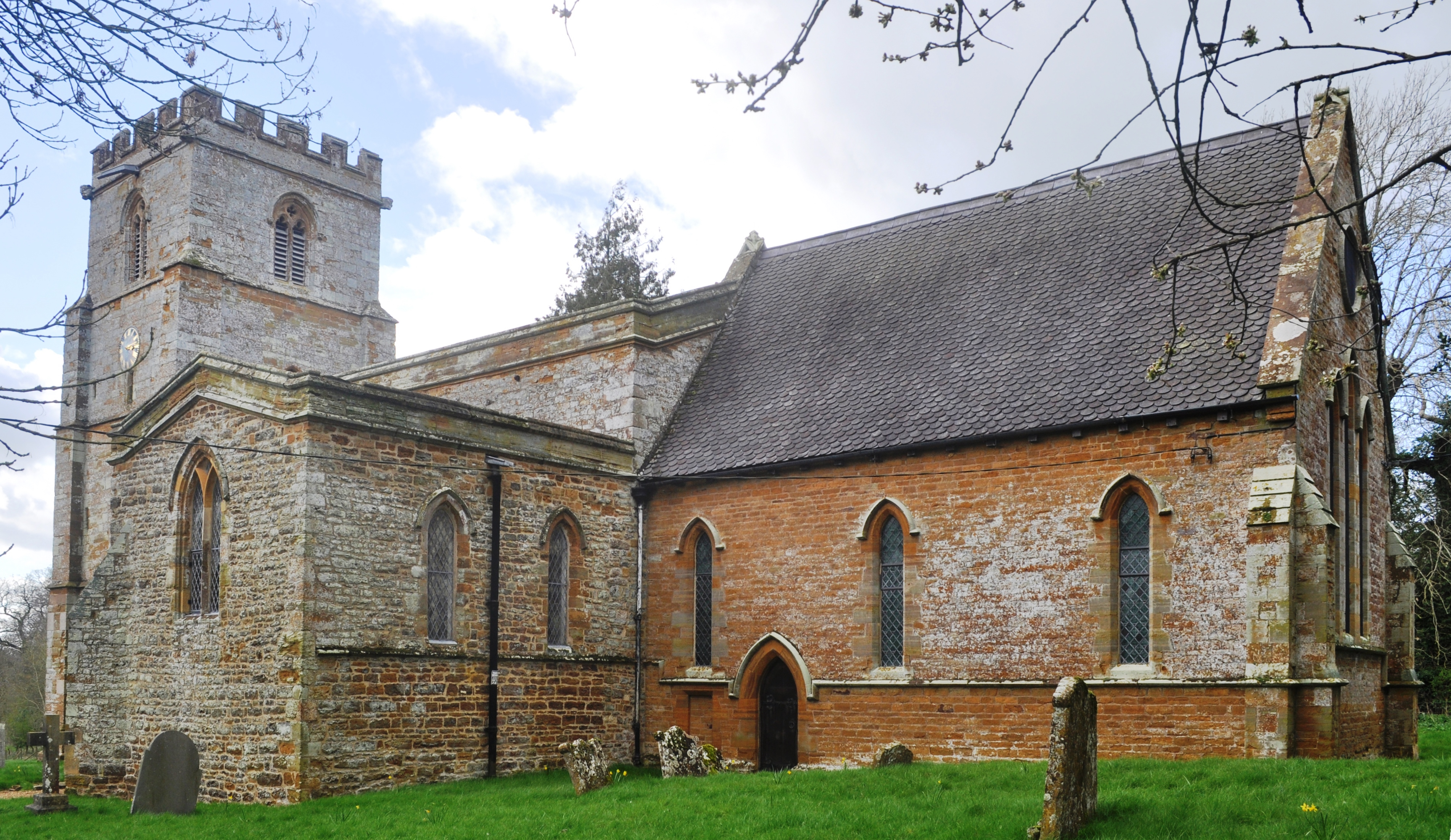
- St Michael & All Angels' Church, Winwick
- 52.3593°N 1.0826°W
- Denomination: Church of England

Administration
- Province: Canterbury
- Diocese: Diocese of Peterborough
- Archdeaconry: Northampton
- Deanery: Brixworth

Clergy
- Vicar: Rev Graham Collingridge

St Michael & All Angels' Church is an Anglican Church and the parish church of Winwick, Northamptonshire. It is a Grade II* listed building.

There was presumably a church at Winwick in 1086, when the Domesday Book records the presence of a priest there, although it does not mention a church building as such.

The main structure of the present building was erected in the 13th and 14th centuries, but the present chancel was built in 1853 to a design by E F Law. The church has a cruciform plan with a west tower. A detailed description appears on the Historic England website.

The parish registers survive from 1567, the historic registers being deposited at Northamptonshire Record Office.

Winwick is part of a united benefice along with Long Buckby, Watford and West Haddon. Each parish retains its own church building.
