= All Saints Church, Sutton Bassett =

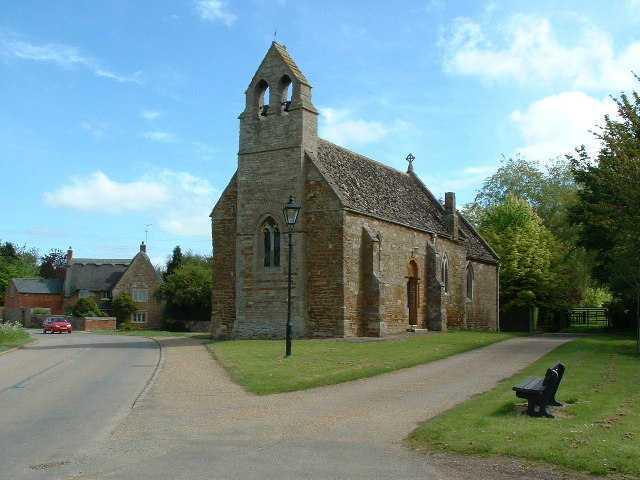

- Location in Northamptonshire
- 52°30′22″N 0°51′50″W
- Country: England
- Denomination: Church of England

Architecture
- Heritage designation: Grade II listed

Administration
- Diocese: Diocese of Peterborough
- Archdeaconry: Oakham
- Deanery: Corby
- Parish: Sutton Bassett

Clergy
- Vicar: Revd Sally Lorraine Hughes

All Saints is the local parish Church of England church for Sutton Bassett, Northamptonshire. It was built as an annexe to St. Mary's Church in the nearby village of Weston by Welland. Originally it fell within the boundaries of the Diocese of Lincoln, and transferred to the Diocese of Peterborough in 1539.

The church dates from the 12th century, but some opinions date it slightly earlier to the late 11th century. Unlike most parish churches, All Saints does not have a graveyard.

It is a Grade II listed building.
