= Arthingworth Manor =

Manor house in Arthingworth, Northamptonshire, England

Coordinates: 52.427340°N 0.886643°W

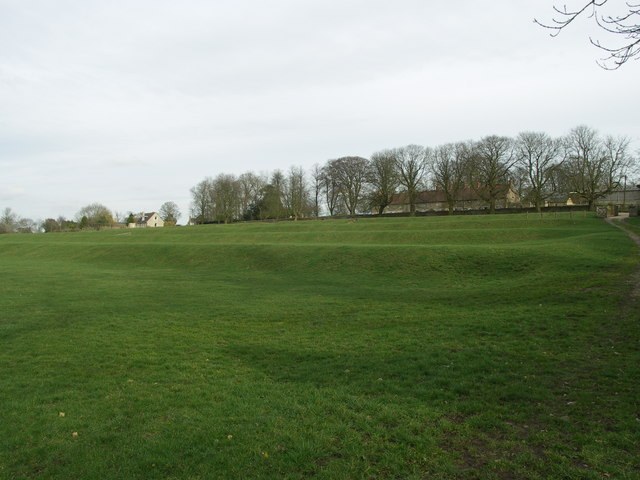
Manorial earthworks

Arthingworth Manor is a Grade II listed country house in Arthingworth, Northamptonshire, England, about 5 miles (8.0 km) southeast of Market Harborough. The estate consists of two manor houses; an older listed house and a stable block converted into a house.

== History ==
The current house was built in the mid 19th century for the Rokeby family. In the 20th century it belonged to the Nunburnholme family. The estate was acquired by Savills in 1954, who put it on the market in 2011 for about $8 million. It became a listed building on 19 July 1985.

== Architecture ==
Arthingworth Manor is a two-storey brick house. Stone wall traces remain from an earlier 18th century dwelling. The left projecting wing no longer exists. The right wing features a canted end, and a flat roof, added in the 20th century. It contains a staircase with quarter landings and a turned balustrade. The dining room is situated in the eastern side, and has a large bay overlooking the eastern and southern gardens.

The stables to the east date to the 18th century and have been converted into a house by Kellet & Partners, which is now known as "The Manor" and the older house the "Old Manor".

== Grounds ==
The estate covers about 678 acres in total. The gardens of the old Manor are well-landscaped, and consist of lime, oak and silver birch trees and a circular pond and box hedging. In the northern end are numerous greenhouses and outbuildings. At the end of the driveway is Manor Lodge, a small two-bedroom brick lodge with a slated roof. Manor Farm lies in the eastern side of the grounds and comprises 209.96 acres of farmland and livestock buildings. The River Ise flows to the south, Desborough Road passes to the north and Braybook Road to the east.
