= Exton and Horn =

Civil parish in Rutland, England

Coordinates: 52.695°N 0.610°W

Exton and Horn is a civil parish in Rutland, England, formed in 2016 upon the merger of the historic parishes of Exton and Horn.

== History ==
By 1614, the two villages were under the ownership of Sir James Harrington. In 1614, they were purchased by Sir Baptist Hicks along with the village of Whitwell. The villages' land later fell into the ownership of the Earls of Gainsborough. In 2016, it was decided by Rutland County Council to merge the villages of Exton and Horn. This was done on the grounds that Horn no longer existed as a village and was just a small hamlet based around a mill. On 1 April 2016, the two villages were merged to become a single parish. The village of Exton had previously been referred to as Exton (with Horn) in official records.

== Village hall ==
In 1931, the village hall was constructed because of donations from the Countess of Gainsborough. In the 21st century, Exton and Horn Parish Council wanted to register the village hall for charitable purposes. However there was doubt as to if the council was actually the legal owner of the hall. Investigations by solicitors found that whilst the council and the Countess (and her successors as Earl/Countess of Gainsborough) were to be joint trustees to the hall, the hall was legally the property of the council and could be registered as a charity property though any land registration would have to be done with joint agreement.
