= Moot Hall, Daventry =

Municipal building in Daventry, Northamptonshire, England

The Moot Hall
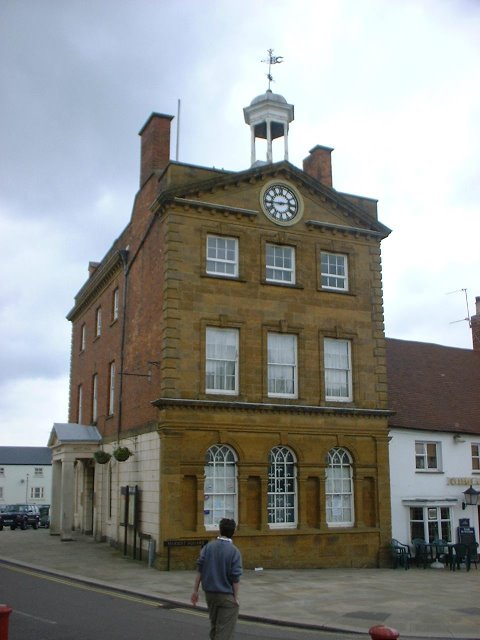
- The Moot Hall

- Shown in Northamptonshire
- 52.2588°N 1.1605°W
- Location: Chapel Lane, Daventry

History
- Built: 1769

Site notes
- Architectural style: Neoclassical style

Listed Building – Grade II*
- Official name: Moot Hall
- Designated: 4 December 1953
- Reference no.: 1067667

The Moot Hall is a municipal building in Chapel Lane in Daventry, Northamptonshire, England. The building, which was the headquarters of Daventry Borough Council, is a Grade II* listed building.

== History ==
The first moot hall in the town was a medieval structure erected on the east side of New Street in around 1150. In the early 19th century civic leaders decided to demolish the old moot hall and, as a replacement, to make appropriate alterations to an existing house in Chapel Lane, which had been designed in the neoclassical style and built in ironstone in 1769. The design of the house involved a symmetrical main frontage with three bays facing onto Abbey Street; the ground floor featured three round headed windows with archivolts and keystones flanked by niches created with short Doric order pilasters and entablatures. At the corners of the ground floor there were larger Doric order pilasters supporting a wider entablature and a cornice. The first and second floors featured sash windows with archivolts and keystones and at roof level there was a modillioned pediment. A cupola and a weather vane were erected at roof level.

In 1806, following its acquisition by the town authorities under the Daventry Improvement, Market and Moot Hall Act 1806 (46 Geo. 3. c. cxviii), the Chapel Lane building was remodelled to create a new moot hall with the Chapel Lane elevation and much of the internal structure being rebuilt in red brick. A new porch was erected on that elevation and the pediment on the Abbey Street side was augmented by the installation of a 17th century clock, which had been recovered from the old moot hall, in the tympanum. The original staircase from the building was transferred to the Manor House in Welton. The moot hall became the meeting place of the local borough council as well as the venue for the weekly hearings of the local magistrates' courts. The original mechanically operated clock was replaced with an electrically operated one during the mid-20th century.

The moot hall continued to serve as the headquarters of the borough council for much of the 20th century but ceased to be the local seat of government after the enlarged Daventry District Council was formed with its offices in Church Walk in 1974. A local history museum was established in the moot hall in the early 1980s: items on display included the original mechanically operated clock as well as a set of imperial measures, typically held by local authorities to ensure tradesmen comply with the Weights and Measures Act 1824. The building also accommodated the local tourist information office at that time.

After the museum and tourist information office moved to New Street in 2004, the moot hall operated as an Indian restaurant from May 2006 and then saw a variety of commercial uses before being converted to become a children's nursery in January 2020.

== See also ==
- Grade II* listed buildings in Daventry District
