= All Saints' Church, Horn =

Church in Horn, Rutland

History
- Dedication: All Saints

Administration
- Parish: Horn, Rutland

All Saints' Church was a church in Horn, Rutland.

== History ==
The church fell into ruin in the 15th century. The church was taxed in 1428 but in 1539 was described as being destroyed.

After it fell into disrepair, rectors were still appointed. One was installed under a thorn tree in 1471. Rev. Leland Noel (1797–1870), son of Sir Gerard Noel, 2nd Baronet, was appointed rector of Horn and vicar of Exton in 1832.
