= St Lawrence's Church, Long Buckby =

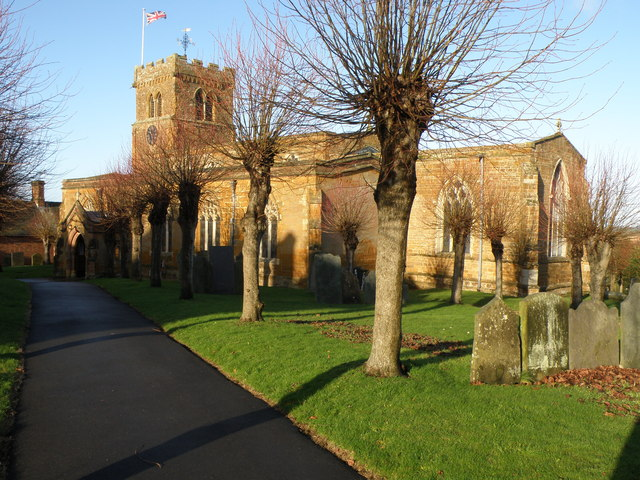
- St Lawrence's Church, Long Buckby
- 52°18′15″N 1°04′54″W
- Denomination: Church of England
- Website: https://onechurch4parishes.co.uk/

Administration
- Province: Canterbury
- Diocese: Diocese of Peterborough
- Archdeaconry: Northampton
- Deanery: Brixworth

Clergy
- Vicar: Rev Kevin Montgomery

St Lawrence's Church is an Anglican Church and the parish church of Long Buckby, Northamptonshire. It is a Grade II* listed building and stands on the north side of Church Street.

There is no reference to a church or priest in the entry for Long Buckby in the Domesday Book.

The main structure of the present building is medieval, with restoration in 1862 by George Gilbert Scott and in 1883–87 by William Bassett-Smith. The church consists of a chancel, nave, north and south aisles, south porch and west tower. A detailed description appears on the Historic England website.

The parish registers survive from 1558, the historic registers being deposited at Northamptonshire Record Office.

Long Buckby is part of a united Benefice along with Watford, West Haddon and Winwick. Each parish retains its own church building.
