= St Mary's Church, Welford =

Church in Northamptonshire, England

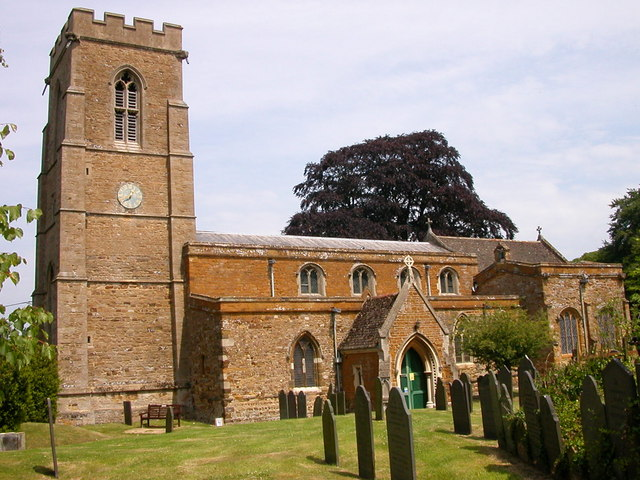
- St Mary's Church, Welford
- 52.4173°N 1.0587°W
- Denomination: Church of England
- Website: www.welfordchurches.org.uk

Architecture
- Architect(s): E F Law (North aisle and arcade, 1872)

Administration
- Province: Canterbury
- Diocese: Diocese of Peterborough
- Archdeaconry: Northampton
- Deanery: Brixworth

Clergy
- Rector: Rev Janet Donaldson

St Mary's Church is an Anglican church and the parish church of Welford. It is a Grade II* listed building and stands on the east side of the junction of Church Lane and West Street.

There was presumably a church at Welford by 1086, when the Domesday Book records the presence of a priest there, although it does not mention a church building as such.

The main structure of the present building was erected in the 13th to 15th centuries. In 1872, it was restored and the north aisle rebuilt by E F Law. The church now consists of a nave, north and south aisles, chancel and west tower. A detailed description appears on the Historic England website.

The parish registers survive from 1561, the historic registers being deposited at Northamptonshire Record Office.

The monumental inscriptions inside the church and in its old graveyard have been transcribed and published. A monument in the churchyard, approximately 10 metres south of the south aisle, is a Grade II listed building in its own right. The description on the Historic England website is “Pair of headstones. Late 17th century. Lias ashlar with moulded heads. Oval inscription panel with partially legible inscription to Elizabeth Woodford dated 1677.”

Welford is part of a united benefice along with Marston Trussell and Sibbertoft. Each parish retains its own church building.
