= Horn, Rutland =

Former civil parish in Rutland, England

Coordinates: 52.697°N 0.591°W

Horn
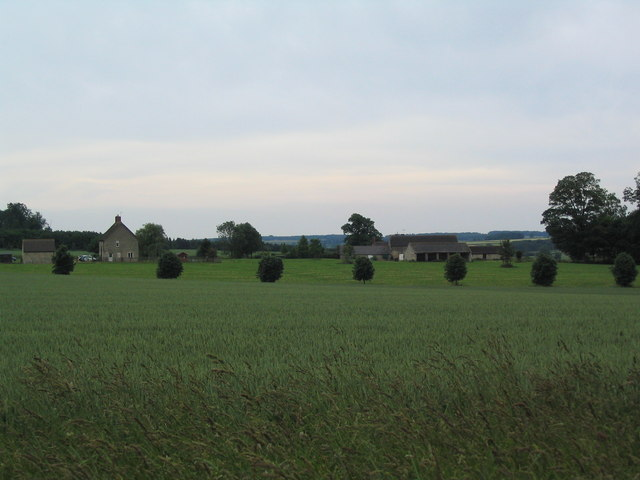
- Horn House

- Location within Rutland
- Area: 1.48 sq mi (3.8 km^{2})
- Population: 9 2001 Census
  - Density: 6/sq mi (2.3/km^{2})
- OS grid reference: SK962123
  - London: 85 miles (137 km) SSE
- Civil parish: Exton and Horn
- Unitary authority: Rutland
- Shire county: Rutland
- Ceremonial county: Rutland
- Region: East Midlands
- Country: England
- Sovereign state: United Kingdom
- Post town: STAMFORD
- Postcode district: PE9
- Dialling code: 01780
- Police: Leicestershire
- Fire: Leicestershire
- Ambulance: East Midlands
- UK Parliament: Rutland and Stamford

Horn is a former civil parish, now in the parish of Exton and Horn, in the county of Rutland, England. In 2001 it had a population of 9, which was included in the civil parish of Empingham at the 2011 census. The parish is part of the Exton Hall estate of the Earls of Gainsborough. The civil parish, with just three properties, was abolished on 1 April 2016 and merged with Exton to form "Exton and Horn".

== History ==
The village's name means 'Horn-shaped feature'. It has been thought that this alludes to a slight bend in the North Brook, yet the earthworks of the village are likewise situated close to a ridge.

The village of Horn was mentioned in the Domesday survey, as 'Two hides in Horn of which Langfer had been tenant under Edward the Confessor were held of the king by the Bishop of Durham'.

In 1287, Richard son of Richard de Seyton had a manor house at Horne and in 1378 Sir John Seyton had his capital messuage here, although the manor was reportedly valueless in 1376. The land was turned from arable to pasture, which has been suggested as the cause of depopulation.

All Saints' Church, fell into disrepair and new rectors were installed under a thorn tree in 1471, and until the last appointment in 1832.

Horn is part of the Alstoe hundred of Rutland.

Proximity to the parish meant that the 1470 Battle of Losecoat Field during the War of the Roses was once called the Battle of Hornfield.
