= St Andrew's Church, Arthingworth =

Anglican church in Northamptonshire, England

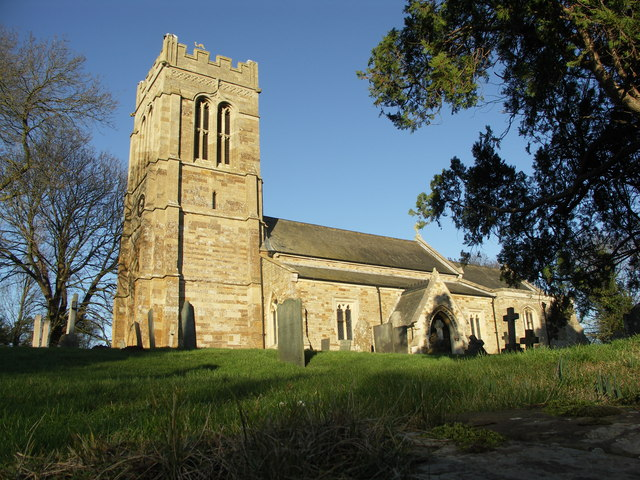
- St Andrew's Church, Arthingworth
- 52°25′32″N 0°53′30″W
- Denomination: Church of England
- Website: http://www.faxtongroup.org.uk/standrewschurcharthingworth.htm

Architecture
- Heritage designation: Grade II*
- Designated: 2 November 1954

Administration
- Province: Canterbury
- Diocese: Diocese of Peterborough
- Archdeaconry: Northampton
- Deanery: Brixworth

Clergy
- Rector: Rev Canon Mary Garbutt

St Andrew's Church is an Anglican Church and the parish church of Arthingworth. It is a Grade II* listed building and stands on the north side of Braybrooke Road.

There is no reference to a church or priest in the entry for the parish in the Domesday Book, which was compiled in 1086. This may indicate the absence of a church building at that stage or, alternatively, only the absence of a resident priest.

The main structure of the present building was erected in the 12th and 14th centuries. Restoration was carried out in the 19th century. The church consists of a nave, north and south aisles, chancel and west tower. A detailed description appears on the Historic England website.

The parish registers survive from 1650 and, apart from those currently in use, are kept at Northamptonshire Record Office. Details of its location and opening times can be found on the Record Office website.

Arthingworth is part of a united Benefice along with East Farndon, Harrington and Oxendon. Each parish retains its own church building.
