= Arthingworth =

Village in Northamptonshire, England

Coordinates: 52.4263°N 0.8911°W

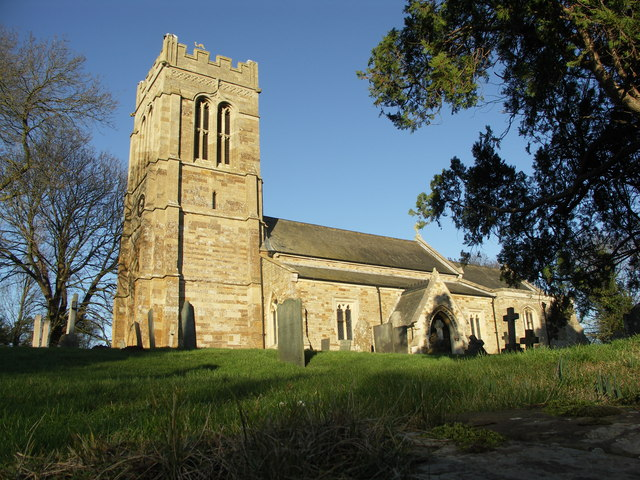
- St. Andrew's Church, Arthingworth

- Location within Northamptonshire
- Population: 231 (2011)
- OS grid reference: SP755815
- Unitary authority: West Northamptonshire
- Ceremonial county: Northamptonshire
- Region: East Midlands
- Country: England
- Sovereign state: United Kingdom
- Post town: MARKET HARBOROUGH
- Postcode district: LE16
- Dialling code: 01858
- Police: Northamptonshire
- Fire: Northamptonshire
- Ambulance: East Midlands
- UK Parliament: Kettering

Arthingworth is a civil parish and village in the West Northamptonshire area of the county of Northamptonshire, England. The population of the civil parish at the 2011 census was 238.

The villages name probably means, 'enclosure connected with Earn(a)'.Earn referring to a river, suggesting the village was near a body of water. In the Domesday book the village appears as Erthingworde, at the time of the Domesday survey the village was owned by William the Conqueror.

== Location and communications ==
The nearest towns are Market Harborough about 4 miles (6.4 km) north and Kettering 9 miles (14.5 km) east via the A14 road which connects the town to the M1, M6 and M11 motorways.

Between 1859 and 1960 the village was served by Kelmarsh railway station about 1 mile south-west of the village and running trains between Northampton in the south and Market Harborough in the north.

== Administration ==
The village has its own Parish Council.

== Notable buildings ==
The Historic England website contains details of a total of eight listed buildings in the parish of Arthingworth, all of which are Grade II apart from St Andrew's Church, which is Grade II*. They include:

- St Andrew's Church, Braybrooke Road
- Arthingworth Lodge, Kelmarsh Road
- Arthingworth Manor. This was left as a shell in 1967 revealing walls probably from an older house. A stable block remains, now converted to a house but incorporating the Manor House staircase.
- Bosworth House
- Glebe House, Kelmarsh Road
- Hall Farmhouse, Oxendon Road
