= Pitsford =

Village in Northamptonshire, England

Coordinates: 52.3064°N 0.8927°W

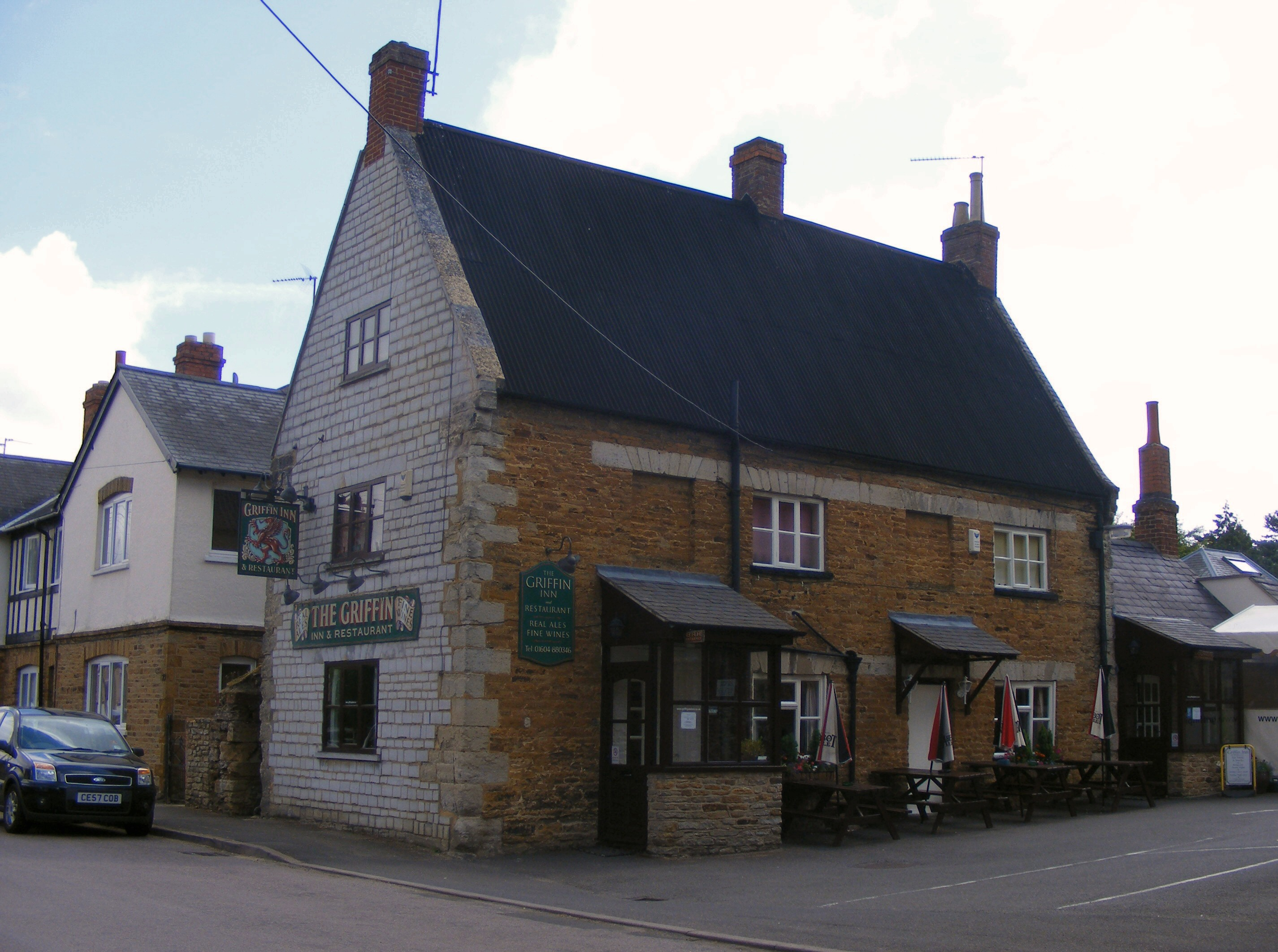
- The Griffin Inn, Pitsford

- Location within Northamptonshire
- Population: 671 (2011)
- OS grid reference: SP7568
- Unitary authority: West Northamptonshire
- Ceremonial county: Northamptonshire
- Region: East Midlands
- Country: England
- Sovereign state: United Kingdom
- Post town: Northampton
- Postcode district: NN6
- Dialling code: 01604
- Police: Northamptonshire
- Fire: Northamptonshire
- Ambulance: East Midlands
- UK Parliament: Kettering

Pitsford is a village and civil parish in the West Northamptonshire unitary authority area of Northamptonshire, England. The village is around 5 miles (8 km) north of Northampton. According to 2001 census, the parish's population was 636 people, increasing to 671 at the 2011 census.

The village's name means 'Peoht's ford'.

Pitsford Water, which is used for fishing and sailing as well as storing water for the local area, is north-west of the village, but only part of it lies within the parish. Pitsford Airstrip is at Moulton Grange Farm.

== Notable buildings ==
The Historic England website contains details of a total of 15 entries for listed buildings in the parish of Pitsford, all of which are Grade II except for All Saints' Church which is Grade II*. These include:

- All Saints' Church, Church Lane. The church has a Norman doorway. The other parts are later. the Church was restored and the chancel rebuilt in 1867.
- Griffin Inn, High Street, old coaching inn where during the battle of Naseby King Charles 1st stayed and was informed of the defeat before retreating to London.
- Pitsford Hall, Moulton Road, which is now used by Pitsford School. The Hall was originally built before 1785 to the design of John Johnson who also designed Kingsthorpe Hall and the County (or City) Rooms in Leicester. Pitsford Hall has been altered since 1945.
- Sedgebrook Hall which was built in 1861 and is now a venue for special events.

== Quarrying ==
Ironstone is quarried at Pitsford and was formerly transported by rail. From 1925 to 1965 the quarrying was to obtain iron ore. It began to the south of the road from the A508 to Pitsford and Brampton Station and worked its way eastward to the A508. From 1959 the quarry was on the east side of the A508. The stone was transported to the main railway by a standard gauge branch operated by steam locomotives.That main railway line is now part of the preserved Northampton & Lamport Railway which has its headquarters at Pitsford and Brampton railway station. From 1925 to 1939 gannister was also obtained and this was taken from the western part of the quarry to the standard gauge branch by a short 2 foot gauge tramway with its own steam locomotive. Quarrying for the iron industry ceased in 1965 The quarry to the west of the main road was smoothed over as was the route of the branch railway by Spring 1967 but the quarry to the east of the A508 was later reopened for the obtaining of stone for road building, the stone being taken away by lorry. Steam quarrying machines were used at first but diesel machines were introduced from 1927 onwards. The steam machines were scrapped in 1958. Electric machines were also used from 1955.

20,000 trees have been planted on the later quarried area since 2002.

== Notable inhabitants ==
- Judy Carne, TV actress, lived here from the late 1980s until her death in 2015.
- Stanisław Kościałkowski, Polish historian, lived here from 1950 until his death in 1960.
- Bishop Robert Skinner (Bishop of Bristol, Oxford and Worcester) was born in the village on 10 February 1591
- Henry Watkin, printer and socialist, was born in the village in 1824.
