= Draughton, Northamptonshire =

Village in Northamptonshire, England

Coordinates: 52.3837°N 0.8848°W

Draughton
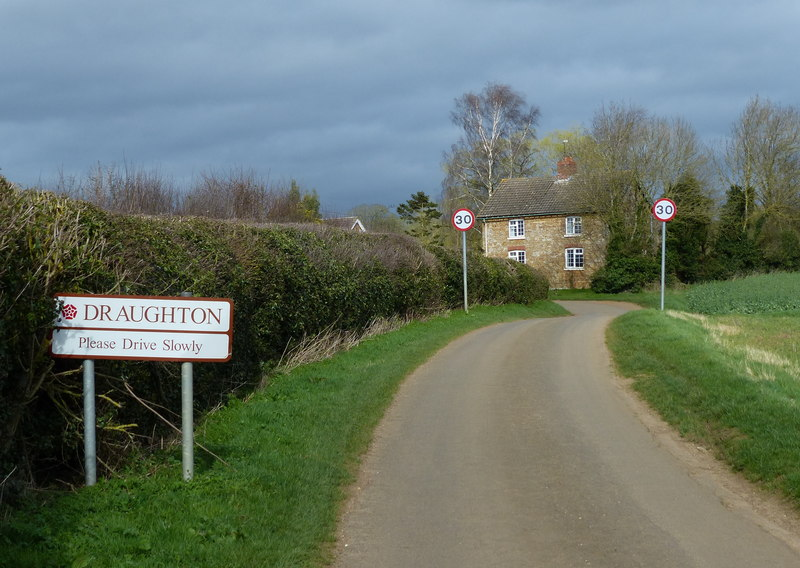

- Location within Northamptonshire
- OS grid reference: SP7676
- Unitary authority: West Northamptonshire
- Ceremonial county: Northamptonshire
- Region: East Midlands
- Country: England
- Sovereign state: United Kingdom
- Post town: Northampton
- Postcode district: NN6
- Dialling code: 01604
- Police: Northamptonshire
- Fire: Northamptonshire
- Ambulance: East Midlands
- UK Parliament: Kettering

Draughton (/ˈdrɔːtən/ DRAW-tən) is a village and civil parish in West Northamptonshire, England. It is situated approximately one mile east of Maidwell at grid reference SP762767.

The villages name means 'dray farm/settlement'.

== Notable buildings ==
The Historic England website contains details of a total of five listed buildings in the parish of Draughton, all of which are Grade II apart from St Catherine's Church, which is Grade II*. They include:

- St Catherine's Church
- Church Farmhouse
- Old Rectory
- Thor missile site at former RAF Harrington
- K6 telephone kiosk
