= Maidwell =

Village in Northamptonshire, England

Coordinates: 52°23′06.4″N 0°54′15.6″W

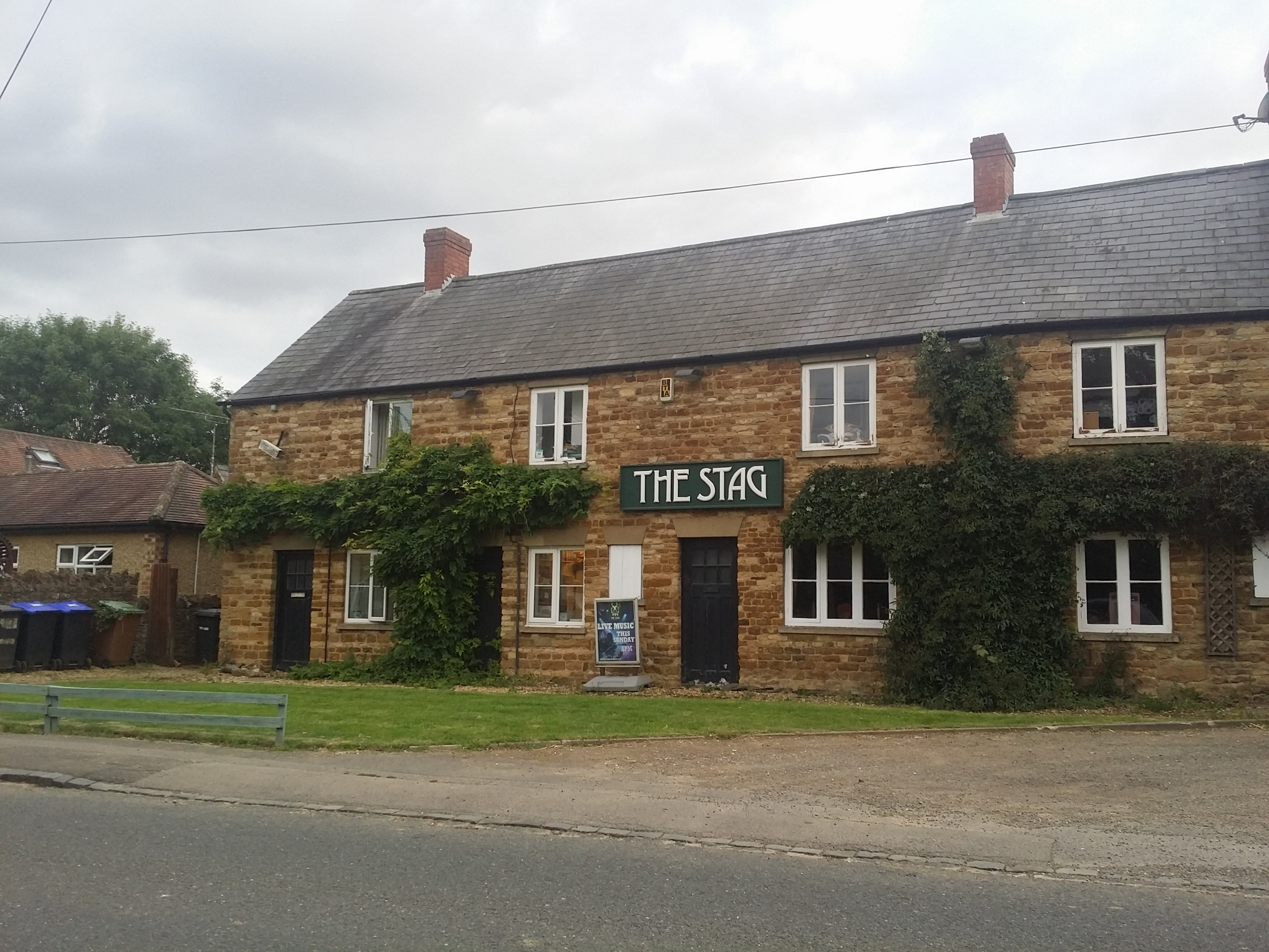
- The Stag Inn, Maidwell

- Location within Northamptonshire
- Population: 429 (2011)
- OS grid reference: SP7476
  - London: 78 miles (126 km)
- Unitary authority: West Northamptonshire
- Ceremonial county: Northamptonshire
- Region: East Midlands
- Country: England
- Sovereign state: United Kingdom
- Post town: Northampton
- Postcode district: NN6
- Dialling code: 01604
- Police: Northamptonshire
- Fire: Northamptonshire
- Ambulance: East Midlands
- UK Parliament: Kettering

Maidwell is a village and civil parish in West Northamptonshire in England. At the time of the 2001 census, the parish had 325 inhabitants, including Draughton, and this increased to 429 at the 2011 census.

The village's name means 'maidens' spring/stream'.

== Location ==
The A508 road runs through its western end and the village is about halfway between the market town of Market Harborough, Leicestershire, and the county town of Northampton which is about 7 miles (11.3 km) south. It is about 1 mile (1.6 km) south of junction 2 of the major A14 road.

== Notable buildings ==
The Historic England website contains details of a total of nine listed buildings in the parish of Maidwell, all of which are Grade II apart from St Mary the Virgin's Church, which is Grade II*. They include the following:

- Church of St Mary the Virgin, Draughton Road
- Maidwell Hall (until 2025, Maidwell Hall School)
- Old Bakehouse, Draughton Road
- Old House, Harborough Road
- Old Rectory, Draughton Road

== Railway ==
Lamport railway station on the Northampton and Market Harborough railway opened on 16 February 1859 serving Maidwell as well as other nearby villages. The line closed to passenger traffic in 1960, and later completely closed to all traffic.

== Maidwell Hall School ==
Maidwell Hall was an independent boys and girls boarding and day preparatory school for children from 4–13 years old. It closed in July 2025.
