= Northamptonshire Record Office =

Coordinates: 52.2132°N 0.9007°W

The Northamptonshire Record Office is the county record office for Northamptonshire. The archives are held at Wootton Hall Park, Wootton, Northampton, and run by Northamptonshire County Council.

The site also houses the Northamptonshire Record Society.
