= Grade I listed buildings in Northamptonshire =

Northamptonshire shown within England

There are more than 9,000 Grade I listed buildings in England. This page is a list of these buildings in the county of Northamptonshire, by local government district.

Northamptonshire was reorganised into two unitary authority areas in April 2021, North Northamptonshire and West Northamptonshire. This list is broken up into the districts prior to April 2021, shown as subheadings.

== North Northamptonshire ==
=== Corby ===
Name	Location	Type	Completed (Note: The date given is the date used by Historic England as significant for the initial building or that of an important part in the structure's description.)	Date designated	Grid ref. (Note: The grid reference is based on the British national grid reference system, sometimes known as OSGB36, used by the Ordnance Survey.) Geo-coordinates	Entry number (Note: The "List Entry Number" is a unique number assigned to each listed building and scheduled monument by Historic England.)	Image
Church of St Mary Magdalene	Cottingham, Corby	Parish Church	12th century	25 February 1957	SP8461289944; 52°30′03″N 0°45′18″W	1051745	Church of St Mary Magdalene More images
Church of St Peter	East Carlton, Corby	Parish Church	1788	25 February 1957	SP8313689329; 52°29′44″N 0°46′37″W	1192313	Church of St Peter More images
Church of St James the Great	Gretton, Corby	Parish Church	Early 12th century	25 February 1957	SP8985494417; 52°32′25″N 0°40′36″W	1051731	Church of St James the Great More images
Kirby Hall (that part in Bulwick Civil Parish)	Deene, Gretton, Corby	Country House	1570-1575	17 April 1972	SP9258492694; 52°31′27″N 0°38′13″W	1374889	Kirby Hall (that part in Bulwick Civil Parish) More images
Kirby Hall, attached walls and archways	Gretton, Corby	Country House	1570-75	17 April 1972	SP9258092698; 52°31′27″N 0°38′13″W	1372559	Kirby Hall, attached walls and archways More images
Rockingham Castle	Rockingham, Corby	Castle	13th century	25 October 1951	SP8670091375; 52°30′48″N 0°43′26″W	1193409	Rockingham Castle More images
Church of St Peter	Stanion, Corby	Parish Church	Mid 13th century	25 February 1957	SP9148086848; 52°28′19″N 0°39′17″W	1193621	Church of St Peter More images
Church of St Mary	Weldon, Corby	Parish Church	Early 13th century	25 February 1957	SP9278289336; 52°29′39″N 0°38′05″W	1372577	Church of St Mary More images

=== East Northamptonshire ===
Name	Location	Type	Completed	Date designated	Grid ref. Geo-coordinates	Entry number	Image
Church of All Saints	Aldwincle	Church	13th century	25 May 1967	TL0112281522; 52°25′20″N 0°30′52″W	1191528	Church of All Saints More images
Church of St Peter	Aldwincle	Church	Late 12th century	23 May 1967	TL0061681862; 52°25′32″N 0°31′18″W	1040308	Church of St Peter More images
Lyveden New Bield	Aldwincle	Summerhouse	1604-5	31 July 1987	SP9840385309; 52°27′25″N 0°33′12″W	1371907	Lyveden New Bield More images
Lyveden Old Bield and attached Outbuildings	Aldwincle	House	Earlier	23 May 1967	SP9816885882; 52°27′43″N 0°33′24″W	1040347	Lyveden Old Bield and attached Outbuildings More images
Apethorpe Hall	Apethorpe Park, Apethorpe	Country house	15th century	23 May 1967	TL0231895458; 52°32′51″N 0°29′33″W	1040083	Apethorpe Hall More images
Church of St Leonard	Apethorpe	Church	14th century to 15th century	23 May 1967	TL0249695701; 52°32′58″N 0°29′23″W	1371995	Church of St Leonard More images
Barnwell Castle	Barnwell St Andrew, Barnwell	Castle	About 1266	25 January 1988	TL0491785203; 52°27′17″N 0°27′27″W	1294426	Barnwell Castle More images
Church of St Andrew	Barnwell St Andrew, Barnwell	Church	Late 13th century	23 May 1967	TL0491884968; 52°27′09″N 0°27′27″W	1040245	Church of St Andrew More images
Church of St Andrew	Brigstock	Church	Late 10th century	23 May 1967	SP9461385212; 52°27′24″N 0°36′33″W	1371950	Church of St Andrew More images
Church of St Nicholas	Bulwick	Church	13th century	23 May 1967	SP9628394252; 52°32′15″N 0°34′55″W	1191576	Church of St Nicholas More images
Church of St Andrew	Cotterstock	Church	Late 12th century	23 May 1967	TL0489890549; 52°30′10″N 0°27′22″W	1040253	Church of St Andrew More images
Cotterstock Hall and attached Outbuildings	Cotterstock	Country House	1658	1 July 1975	TL0459290669; 52°30′14″N 0°27′38″W	1293978	Upload Photo
Deene Hall	Deene Park, Deene	Country House	16th century to 19th century	23 May 1967	SP9502392705; 52°31′26″N 0°36′03″W	1040131	Deene Hall More images
Church of the Holy Trinity	Denford	Boiler House	19th century	23 May 1967	SP9914676626; 52°22′43″N 0°32′42″W	1040320	Church of the Holy Trinity More images
Church of All Saints	Easton on the Hill	Church	12th century	23 May 1967	TF0110904726; 52°37′51″N 0°30′27″W	1266419	Church of All Saints More images
Church of St Mary and All Saints	Fotheringhay	Church	1434	23 May 1967	TL0599593143; 52°31′33″N 0°26′21″W	1371944	Church of St Mary and All Saints More images
Church of St John the Baptist	Harringworth	Church	Late 12th century	23 May 1967	SP9166097444; 52°34′02″N 0°38′57″W	1040119	Church of St John the Baptist More images
Market Cross, approx. 10 Metres North West of Cross Farmhouse	Harringworth	Market Cross	14th century	23 May 1967	SP9172697318; 52°33′57″N 0°38′53″W	1192445	Market Cross, approx. 10 Metres North West of Cross Farmhouse More images
Bede House	Higham Ferrers	Church Hall	19th century	23 September 1950	SP9614068486; 52°18′22″N 0°35′29″W	1191999	Bede House More images
Chantry Chapel of All Souls	Higham Ferrers	Chapel	Early 15th century	23 September 1950	SP9610368527; 52°18′23″N 0°35′31″W	1040359	Chantry Chapel of All Souls More images
Chichele College, North Range and attached Foundations	Higham Ferrers	Theological College	c. 1422	17 June 1987	SP9599468665; 52°18′28″N 0°35′36″W	1371908	Chichele College, North Range and attached Foundations
Chichele College, South and East Ranges and attached Foundations	Higham Ferrers	Gate	c. 1422	17 June 1987	SP9602168645; 52°18′27″N 0°35′35″W	1040390	Chichele College, South and East Ranges and attached Foundations
Church of St Mary	Higham Ferrers	Church	13th century	23 September 1950	SP9614068527; 52°18′23″N 0°35′29″W	1191957	Church of St Mary More images
Churchyard Cross approx. 8 Metres West of Chantry Chapel of All Souls	Higham Ferrers	Cross	Early 14th century	23 September 1950	SP9608868519; 52°18′23″N 0°35′32″W	1040360	Churchyard Cross approx. 8 Metres West of Chantry Chapel of All Souls More images
Market Cross 56 Metres North of Town Hall	Higham Ferrers	Market Cross	14th century	23 September 1950	SP9604168497; 52°18′22″N 0°35′34″W	1192024	Market Cross 56 Metres North of Town Hall More images
Church of St Peter	Irthlingborough	Church	1889-1893	8 May 1950	SP9478770648; 52°19′33″N 0°36′38″W	1040366	Church of St Peter More images
Irthlingborough Old Bridge and attached Causeway (that Part in Irthlingborough Civil Parish)	Irthlingborough	Bridge	Mid 14th century	8 May 1950	SP9569370612; 52°19′31″N 0°35′50″W	1040368	Irthlingborough Old Bridge and attached Causeway (that Part in Irthlingborough Civil Parish) More images
Market Cross at Junction of Station and Finedon Roads	Irthlingborough	Market Cross	Mid 14th century	8 May 1950	SP9473170763; 52°19′36″N 0°36′41″W	1192144	Market Cross at Junction of Station and Finedon Roads
Church of St Nicholas	Islip	Church	14th century	23 May 1967	SP9867178911; 52°23′58″N 0°33′04″W	1040326	Church of St Nicholas More images
Church of All Saints	King's Cliffe	Church	Early 12th century	23 May 1967	TL0069497080; 52°33′44″N 0°30′58″W	1225733	Church of All Saints More images
Lilford Hall	Lilford Park, Lilford-cum-Wigsthorpe	Country House	18th century	23 May 1967	TL0292884069; 52°26′42″N 0°29′13″W	1189554	Lilford Hall More images
Church of St Mary	Little Addington	Church	Late 13th century	23 May 1967	SP9589373563; 52°21′06″N 0°35′37″W	1040336	Church of St Mary More images
Church of St Peter	Lowick	Church	Early 14th century	23 May 1967	SP9776381006; 52°25′06″N 0°33′50″W	1040265	Church of St Peter More images
Drayton House	Drayton Park, Lowick	Country House	Late C13/Early 14th century	23 May 1967	SP9629980019; 52°24′35″N 0°35′09″W	1040293	Drayton House More images
Gates, Gatepiers and attached Screens approx. 600 Metres South East of South Front of Drayton House	Drayton Park, Lowick	Gate	Early 18th century	23 May 1967	SP9673379737; 52°24′26″N 0°34′46″W	1040294	Gates, Gatepiers and attached Screens approx. 600 Metres South East of South Front of Drayton House More images
Gates, Gatepiers and Screen approx. 70 Metres South East of South Front of Drayton House	Drayton Park, Lowick	Gate	1701	23 May 1967	SP9640379993; 52°24′34″N 0°35′03″W	1371919	Gates, Gatepiers and Screen approx. 70 Metres South East of South Front of Drayton House More images
Church of St Peter	Lutton	Church	Saxon	23 May 1967	TL1121087789; 52°28′36″N 0°21′50″W	1040231	Church of St Peter More images
Church of St Mary the Virgin and All Saints	Nassington	Cross	Saxon	23 May 1967	TL0632996174; 52°33′11″N 0°25′59″W	1065930	Church of St Mary the Virgin and All Saints More images
Prebendal Manor House	Nassington	Farmhouse	Until 1836	23 May 1967	TL0629096126; 52°33′09″N 0°26′02″W	1065975	Prebendal Manor House More images
Church of St Peter	Newton Bromswold	Church	Mid 13th century to mid 14th century	28 May 1954	SP9981865858; 52°16′55″N 0°32′18″W	1371900	Church of St Peter More images
Berrystead	Oundle	House	c. 1700	18 June 1955	TL0427888208; 52°28′55″N 0°27′57″W	1190983	Berrystead More images
Cobthorne	Oundle	House	1700	18 June 1955	TL0403088059; 52°28′50″N 0°28′11″W	1372161	Cobthorne More images
Parish Church of St Peter	Oundle	Parish Church	Norman	18 June 1955	TL0419988196; 52°28′54″N 0°28′02″W	1190787	Parish Church of St Peter More images
The Talbot Hotel, incl. Ranges of Stables and Barns at rear, Mounting Block near main Carriage Entrance	Oundle	Stables	1552	18 June 1955	TL0406688126; 52°28′52″N 0°28′09″W	1372145	The Talbot Hotel, incl. Ranges of Stables and Barns at rear, Mounting Block near main Carriage Entrance More images
Church of All Saints	Polebrook	Church	Late 12th century	23 May 1967	TL0684087060; 52°28′16″N 0°25′43″W	1040232	Church of All Saints More images
Church of St Peter	Raunds	Church	12th century	26 April 1950	TL0004073087; 52°20′48″N 0°31′58″W	1192206	Church of St Peter More images
Church of the Nativity of the Blessed Virgin Mary	Ringstead	Church	12th century	23 May 1967	SP9860875125; 52°21′55″N 0°33′12″W	1286678	Church of the Nativity of the Blessed Virgin Mary More images
Church of St Mary	Rushden	Church	Early 13th century	9 December 1949	SP9577266536; 52°17′19″N 0°35′50″W	1266098	Church of St Mary More images
Southwick Hall, attached Walls and Stable Block	Southwick	Hall	16th century	23 May 1967	TL0213692177; 52°31′04″N 0°29′46″W	1040240	Southwick Hall, attached Walls and Stable Block More images
Church of St Laurence	Stanwick	Church	13th century	26 April 1950	SP9801771457; 52°19′57″N 0°33′47″W	1192232	Church of St Laurence More images
Castle Barn approx. 50 Metres North East of Thorpe Castle House	Thorpe Waterville, Thorpe Achurch	Barn	Early 14th century	23 May 1967	TL0225881433; 52°25′17″N 0°29′52″W	1040149	Upload Photo
Church of St Mary the Virgin	Titchmarsh	Church	Mid 12th century	23 May 1967	TL0220579866; 52°24′26″N 0°29′56″W	1265555	Church of St Mary the Virgin More images
Church of St John the Baptist	Wakerley	Church	12th century	23 May 1967	SP9567299218; 52°34′57″N 0°35′22″W	1234011	Church of St John the Baptist More images
Church of St Mary the Virgin	Warmington	Church	Late 12th century	23 May 1967	TL0773691010; 52°30′23″N 0°24′51″W	1191333	Church of St Mary the Virgin More images
Church of St Mary	Woodford	Church	Mid 12th century	23 May 1967	SP9693876732; 52°22′48″N 0°34′38″W	1225983	Church of St Mary More images
Glebe Farmhouse	Woodford	Farmhouse	c1260-1320	23 May 1967	SP9692876759; 52°22′49″N 0°34′39″W	1225981	Upload Photo

=== Kettering ===
Name	Location	Type	Completed	Date designated	Grid ref. Geo-coordinates	Entry number	Image
Church of St Mary	Ashley, Kettering	Church	Late 13th century	25 February 1957	SP7942291014; 52°30′40″N 0°49′52″W	1052127	Church of St Mary More images
Church of Saint Botolph	Barton Seagrave, Kettering	Church	Early 12th century	27 February 1950	SP8883677087; 52°23′05″N 0°41′46″W	1051640	Church of Saint Botolph More images
Church of St Mary	Brampton Ash, Kettering	Church	13th century	25 February 1957	SP7886687480; 52°28′46″N 0°50′25″W	1052135	Church of St Mary More images
Burton Latimer Hall and Wall attached to South	Burton Latimer, Kettering	Country House	Medieval	18 January 1950	SP8984875286; 52°22′06″N 0°40′54″W	1372367	Burton Latimer Hall and Wall attached to South More images
Church of St Mary	Burton Latimer, Kettering	Parish Church	12th century	18 January 1950	SP9031475017; 52°21′57″N 0°40′30″W	1372364	Church of St Mary More images
Church of St Andrew	Cransley, Kettering	Parish Church	Early 14th century	25 February 1957	SP8284576523; 52°22′50″N 0°47′04″W	1213539	Church of St Andrew More images
Anglican and Methodist Church of St Giles	Desborough, Kettering	Cross	Anglo-Saxon	24 January 1950	SP8030683056; 52°26′23″N 0°49′12″W	1213584	Anglican and Methodist Church of St Giles More images
Flats 1, 2, 3, Porch House, Bell Tower, Cloisters, South Wing, Pediment, Corner House and Tower House at Dingley Hall	Dingley, Kettering	Apartment	Late C20	25 October 1951	SP7710387782; 52°28′57″N 0°51′58″W	1294135	Upload Photo
Church of St Mary Magdalene	Geddington, Kettering	Parish Church	Anglo-Saxon	25 February 1957	SP8952483027; 52°26′16″N 0°41′04″W	1052076	Church of St Mary Magdalene More images
Queen Eleanor's Cross	Geddington, Kettering	Statue	Shortly after 1290	25 February 1957	SP8944683024; 52°26′16″N 0°41′08″W	1286992	Queen Eleanor's Cross More images
Church of St James	Grafton Underwood, Kettering	Parish Church	Late C12/Early 13th century	25 February 1957	SP9219880226; 52°24′44″N 0°38′45″W	1052049	Church of St James More images
Dovecote, circa 160 Metres North East of Newton Field Centre	Newton and Little Oakley, Kettering	Dovecote	Late C16/Early 17th century	25 February 1957	SP8856083412; 52°26′29″N 0°41′55″W	1192042	Dovecote, circa 160 Metres North East of Newton Field Centre More images
Church of All Saints	Pytchley, Kettering	Church	19th century	25 February 1957	SP8600374776; 52°21′51″N 0°44′18″W	1288885	Church of All Saints More images
Church of Holy Trinity	Rothwell, Kettering	Parish Church	12th century	12 June 1950	SP8162081144; 52°25′20″N 0°48′04″W	1288778	Church of Holy Trinity More images
Rothwell Market House	Rothwell, Kettering	Local Government Office	1895	12 June 1950	SP8166981209; 52°25′22″N 0°48′02″W	1288812	Rothwell Market House More images
Rushton Hall School	Rushton, Kettering	Courtyard House	Early 16th century	25 October 1951	SP8364682758; 52°26′11″N 0°46′16″W	1192160	Rushton Hall School More images
Rushton Triangular Lodge	Rushton, Kettering	Lodge	1593-5	25 February 1957	SP8304083072; 52°26′22″N 0°46′47″W	1052038	Rushton Triangular Lodge More images
Church of St Edmund	Warkton, Kettering	Parish Church	12th century	25 February 1957	SP8930779835; 52°24′33″N 0°41′19″W	1192374	Church of St Edmund More images
Boughton House	Boughton Park, Weekley, Kettering	Great House	Early 16th century	25 October 1951	SP8997681532; 52°25′28″N 0°40′42″W	1192643	Boughton House More images
Church of St Mary	Weekley, Kettering	Parish Church	c. 1100	25 February 1957	SP8883580990; 52°25′11″N 0°41′43″W	1192452	Church of St Mary More images
Stable Block at Boughton House	Boughton Park, Weekley, Kettering	Stable	1700-4	25 October 1951	SP9007381577; 52°25′29″N 0°40′37″W	1372406	Stable Block at Boughton House More images
Church of St Peter and St Paul	Kettering	Church	c. 1300	27 February 1950	SP8673978414; 52°23′49″N 0°43′36″W	1051642	Church of St Peter and St Paul More images
Orangery at Barton Seagrave Hall	Barton Seagrave, Kettering	Orangery	Late 18th century	27 February 1950	SP8868077336; 52°23′13″N 0°41′54″W	1051650	Upload Photo

=== Wellingborough ===
Name	Location	Type	Completed	Date designated	Grid ref. Geo-coordinates	Entry number	Image
Church of St Mary	Bozeat, Wellingborough	Church	12th century	28 May 1954	SP9061659204; 52°13′25″N 0°40′29″W	1040795	Church of St Mary More images
Church of All Saints	Earls Barton, Wellingborough	Church	Late 10th century	28 May 1954	SP8519063814; 52°15′57″N 0°45′11″W	1294226	Church of All Saints More images
Church of St Peter and St Paul	Easton Maudit, Wellingborough	Church	Late 13th century	28 May 1954	SP8886458819; 52°13′14″N 0°42′02″W	1189610	Church of St Peter and St Paul More images
Church of St Mary Magdalene	Ecton, Wellingborough	Church	13th century	28 May 1954	SP8286163547; 52°15′50″N 0°47′14″W	1294128	Church of St Mary Magdalene More images
Church of St Mary the Virgin	Finedon, Wellingborough	Church	Mid 14th century	23 September 1950	SP9123971966; 52°20′18″N 0°39′44″W	1371745	Church of St Mary the Virgin More images
The Old Vicarage	Great Doddington, Wellingborough	Manor House	16th century	28 May 1954	SP8817164825; 52°16′28″N 0°42′33″W	1371672	Upload Photo
Harrowden Hall (Wellingborough Golf Club)	The Slips, Great Harrowden, Wellingborough	Country House	15th century	28 May 1954	SP8819470855; 52°19′43″N 0°42′26″W	1040730	Harrowden Hall (Wellingborough Golf Club) More images
Church of St Katherine	Irchester, Wellingborough	Church	Late 12th century	28 May 1954	SP9256466010; 52°17′04″N 0°38′40″W	1040713	Church of St Katherine More images
Church of All Hallows	Wellingborough	Church	c. 1070	23 September 1950	SP8918067960; 52°18′09″N 0°41′37″W	1371761	Church of All Hallows More images
Church of St Mary the Virgin	Wellingborough	Village Hall	1908 TO 1930	9 June 1970	SP9013068043; 52°18′11″N 0°40′47″W	1371787	Church of St Mary the Virgin More images
Tithe Barn	Wellingborough	Public Hall	C20	23 September 1950	SP8912567744; 52°18′02″N 0°41′40″W	1293485	Tithe Barn More images

== West Northamptonshire ==
=== Daventry ===
Name	Location	Type	Completed	Date designated	Grid ref. Geo-coordinates	Entry number	Image
Althorp House	Althorp, Daventry	Country House	c. 1508	2 November 1954	SP6817865141; 52°16′49″N 1°00′07″W	1356626	Althorp House More images
Althorp, Falconry or Hawking Tower	Althorp, Daventry	Hunting Lodge	c. 1611	2 November 1954	SP6800865706; 52°17′07″N 1°00′16″W	1356628	Upload Photo
Church of St Leodegarius	Ashby St Ledgers, Daventry	Church	C14-C15	18 January 1968	SP5732468206; 52°18′32″N 1°09′38″W	1076499	Church of St Leodegarius More images
Church of St Mary	Great Brington, Brington, Daventry	Manor House	Late 13th century	2 November 1954	SP6672165219; 52°16′52″N 1°01′24″W	1067622	Church of St Mary More images
Church of All Saints	Brixworth, Daventry	Parish Church	10th century	2 November 1954	SP7475071217; 52°20′02″N 0°54′16″W	1054866	Church of All Saints More images
Church of Holy Cross	Byfield, Daventry	Church	14th century	2 February 1964	SP5192853000; 52°10′22″N 1°14′32″W	1343540	Church of Holy Cross More images
Canons Ashby House	Canons Ashby, Daventry	Country House	Earlier origins	18 September 1953	SP5773150655; 52°09′04″N 1°09′28″W	1075304	Canons Ashby House More images
Church of St Mary	Canons Ashby, Daventry	Church	13th century	18 January 1963	SP5779250524; 52°09′00″N 1°09′24″W	1187152	Church of St Mary More images
Church of Holy Trinity	Charwelton, Daventry	Church	14th century	18 January 1968	SP5447455523; 52°11′43″N 1°12′16″W	1370027	Church of Holy Trinity More images
Church of All Saints	Clipston, Daventry	Manor House	Early 13th century	2 November 1954	SP7138481565; 52°25′39″N 0°57′06″W	1067033	Church of All Saints More images
Church of All Saints	Cottesbrooke, Daventry	Church	Late 13th century	2 November 1954	SP7100973531; 52°21′19″N 0°57′32″W	1067102	Church of All Saints More images
Cottesbrooke Hall	Cottesbrooke, Daventry	Country House	c1702-13	2 November 1954	SP7110874001; 52°21′34″N 0°57′26″W	1356891	Cottesbrooke Hall More images
Church of St Margaret	Crick, Daventry	Church	C14-C15	18 January 1968	SP5882872490; 52°20′50″N 1°08′16″W	1342994	Church of St Margaret More images
Church of the Holy Cross	Daventry, Daventry	Church	1752-1758	4 December 1953	SP5750662571; 52°15′30″N 1°09′32″W	1067696	Church of the Holy Cross More images
Church of St Mary the Virgin	Dodford, Daventry	Church	Early 12th century	18 January 1968	SP6124660545; 52°14′23″N 1°06′16″W	1075249	Church of St Mary the Virgin More images
Church of St John the Baptist	East Farndon, Daventry	Church	13th century and 14th century	2 November 1954	SP7163984757; 52°27′22″N 0°56′50″W	1054010	Church of St John the Baptist More images
East Haddon Hall	East Haddon, Daventry	Country House	c1780-1	2 November 1954	SP6675968306; 52°18′32″N 1°01′20″W	1031915	Upload Photo
Church of St Mary	Everdon, Daventry	Church	14th century	18 January 1968	SP5946457434; 52°12′43″N 1°07′52″W	1076554	Church of St Mary More images
Church of St Mary the Virgin	Fawsley, Daventry	Church	13th century	18 January 1968	SP5653756792; 52°12′23″N 1°10′27″W	1343552	Church of St Mary the Virgin More images
Fawsley Hall	Fawsley, Daventry	Country House	Early 16th century	18 September 1953	SP5622456804; 52°12′24″N 1°10′43″W	1075281	Fawsley Hall More images
Church of St Peter and St Paul	Hannington, Daventry	Manor House	Late 13th century	2 November 1954	SP8115770929; 52°19′50″N 0°48′38″W	1067000	Church of St Peter and St Paul More images
Church of St Andrew	Lower Harlestone, Harlestone, Daventry	Manor House	14th century	2 November 1954	SP7008464612; 52°16′31″N 0°58′27″W	1067076	Church of St Andrew More images
Church of St Mary and All Saints	Holcot, Daventry	Church	C13, C14	2 November 1954	SP7923069833; 52°19′15″N 0°50′20″W	1045863	Church of St Mary and All Saints More images
Holdenby House, carriage arch about 130m north east	Holdenby, Daventry	Country house	1583	2 November 1984	SP6939967714; 52°18′11″N 0°59′01″W	1203593	Holdenby House, carriage arch about 130m north east
Holdenby House, carriage arch about 130m south east	Holdenby, Daventry	Country house	1583	2 November 1954	SP6937167659; 52°18′10″N 0°59′03″W	1356907	Holdenby House, carriage arch about 130m south east
Kelmarsh Hall	Kelmarsh, Daventry	Manor House	c1727-32	2 November 1954	SP7363179602; 52°24′34″N 0°55′08″W	1067012	Kelmarsh Hall More images
Church of All Saints	Lamport, Daventry	Church	Late 12th century	2 November 1954	SP7580974557; 52°21′50″N 0°53′17″W	1367031	Church of All Saints More images
Lamport Hall	Lamport Hall, Lamport, Daventry	Country House	16th century to 19th century	2 November 1954	SP7588374504; 52°21′48″N 0°53′13″W	1054842	Lamport Hall More images
Church of All Saints	Lilbourne, Daventry	Church	12th century	18 January 1968	SP5603977410; 52°23′31″N 1°10′41″W	1287539	Church of All Saints More images
Church of St Nicholas	Marston Trussell, Daventry	Church	13th century	2 November 1954	SP6936385929; 52°28′01″N 0°58′49″W	1216629	Church of St Nicholas More images
Church of St Peter and St Paul	Moulton, Daventry	Church	Saxon	2 November 1954	SP7835866419; 52°17′25″N 0°51′09″W	1356515	Church of St Peter and St Paul More images
Church of St Michael and All Angels	Newnham, Daventry	Church	13th century	18 January 1968	SP5809759727; 52°13′58″N 1°09′03″W	1076538	Church of St Michael and All Angels More images
Church of All Saints	Norton, Daventry	Church	13th century	18 January 1968	SP6030763701; 52°16′05″N 1°07′04″W	1076507	Church of All Saints More images
Church of St Andrew	Old, Daventry	Church	13th century and 14th century	2 November 1954	SP7854573120; 52°21′02″N 0°50′54″W	1376651	Church of St Andrew More images
Church of St Andrew	Spratton, Daventry	Church	12th century	2 November 1954	SP7176970100; 52°19′28″N 0°56′54″W	1356914	Church of St Andrew More images
Church of St Nicholas	Stanford, Daventry	Church	c. 1300	18 January 1968	SP5885178853; 52°24′16″N 1°08′11″W	1228501	Church of St Nicholas More images
Church of St Mary	Staverton, Daventry	Church	Early C14-C15	18 January 1968	SP5409361120; 52°14′44″N 1°12′33″W	1203555	Church of St Mary More images
Church of St Michael	Church Stowe, Stowe IX Churches, Daventry	Church	Saxon	18 January 1968	SP6389057684; 52°12′49″N 1°03′59″W	1343558	Church of St Michael More images
Church of St Peter and St Paul	Watford, Daventry	Church	Early C14-C15	18 January 1968	SP6032769035; 52°18′58″N 1°06′59″W	1077018	Church of St Peter and St Paul More images
Church of All Saints	West Haddon, Daventry	Church	12th century to 14th century	18 January 1968	SP6301971834; 52°20′28″N 1°04′35″W	1229379	Church of All Saints More images
Church of All Saints	Yelvertoft, Daventry	Church	13th century	18 January 1968	SP6025075222; 52°22′18″N 1°06′59″W	1229692	Church of All Saints More images

=== Northampton ===
Name	Location	Type	Completed	Date designated	Grid ref. Geo-coordinates	Entry number	Image
Church of St Andrew	Great Billing, Billing, Northampton	Church	12th century or earlier	3 May 1968	SP8081062910; 52°15′30″N 0°49′03″W	1039722	Church of St Andrew More images
Church of Saint Luke	Duston, Northampton	Church	12th century	9 December 1968	SP7249561050; 52°14′34″N 0°56′23″W	1039755	Church of Saint Luke More images
Church of Saint Michael	Upton, Northampton	Church	12th century	3 May 1968	SP7174760235; 52°14′08″N 0°57′03″W	1372152	Church of Saint Michael More images
Upton Hall (Quinton House School)	Upton, Northampton	Country House	Mid 18th century	3 May 1968	SP7165660210; 52°14′08″N 0°57′08″W	1039760	Upton Hall (Quinton House School) More images
Church of St George	Wootton, Northampton	Church	13th century	3 May 1968	SP7624056530; 52°12′06″N 0°53′09″W	1293986	Church of St George More images
Abington Abbey (museum)	Abington Park, Northampton	House	Early 16th century	19 January 1952	SP7747861497; 52°14′46″N 0°52′00″W	1039763	Abington Abbey (museum) More images
Church of All Saints	Northampton	Church	Medieval	19 January 1952	SP7545760447; 52°14′13″N 0°53′47″W	1372129	Church of All Saints More images
Church of St Giles	Northampton	Church	12th century	19 January 1952	SP7591260576; 52°14′17″N 0°53′23″W	1052403	Church of St Giles More images
Church of St John the Baptist	Kingsthorpe, Northampton	Church	LATE SAXON OR EARLY NORMAN	19 January 1952	SP7466863116; 52°15′40″N 0°54′27″W	1190502	Church of St John the Baptist More images
Church of St Peter	Northampton	Church	SAXON ORIGINS	19 January 1952	SP7497960376; 52°14′11″N 0°54′12″W	1052417	Church of St Peter More images
Church of the Holy Sepulchre	Northampton	Parish Church	About 1100	19 January 1952	SP7539160939; 52°14′29″N 0°53′50″W	1052407	Church of the Holy Sepulchre More images
Sessions House	Northampton	House	1676-1678	19 January 1952	SP7551060426; 52°14′13″N 0°53′44″W	1039664	Sessions House More images
St John's Hall	Northampton	Church Hall	14th century	19 January 1952	SP7541360176; 52°14′05″N 0°53′50″W	1039750	St John's Hall More images
St John's Roman Catholic Church	Northampton	Roman Catholic Church	15th century	19 January 1952	SP7542660187; 52°14′05″N 0°53′49″W	1039749	St John's Roman Catholic Church More images
The Eleanor Cross	Northampton	Cross	1877	9 December 1968	SP7542458222; 52°13′01″N 0°53′51″W	1039797	The Eleanor Cross More images
The Town and County War Memorial	Northampton	War memorial	1926	28 October 2015	SP7549660465; 52°14′14″N 0°53′45″W	1191327	The Town and County War Memorial More images

=== South Northamptonshire ===
Name	Location	Type	Completed	Date designated	Grid ref. Geo-coordinates	Entry number	Image
Church of St Leonard	Aston Le Walls, South Northamptonshire	Church	C12/C13	4 February 1969	SP4955550808; 52°09′12″N 1°16′38″W	1040412	Church of St Leonard More images
Aynhoe Park	Aynho, South Northamptonshire	Country house	Early 17th century	11 September 1953	SP5136633030; 51°59′36″N 1°15′12″W	1040532	Aynhoe Park More images
Church of St Michael	Aynho, South Northamptonshire	Parish Church	14th century	4 February 1969	SP5145133060; 51°59′37″N 1°15′07″W	1371796	Church of St Michael More images
Church of St John the Baptist	Upper Boddington, Boddington, South Northamptonshire	Church	13th century	4 February 1969	SP4824453189; 52°10′29″N 1°17′45″W	1041214	Church of St John the Baptist More images
Church of St Peter	Brackley, South Northamptonshire	Parish Church	Norman	22 April 1950	SP5917837303; 52°01′52″N 1°08′20″W	1371808	Church of St Peter More images
Castle Ashby	Castle Ashby Park, Castle Ashby, South Northamptonshire	Country House	1574-c1600	3 May 1968	SP8626959249; 52°13′29″N 0°44′18″W	1371298	Castle Ashby More images
Church of St Mary Magdalen	Castle Ashby Park, Castle Ashby, South Northamptonshire	Church	14th century	3 May 1968	SP8636659137; 52°13′25″N 0°44′13″W	1294095	Church of St Mary Magdalen More images
Church of St Peter and St Paul	Chacombe, South Northamptonshire	Church	Early 14th century	4 February 1969	SP4907443947; 52°05′30″N 1°17′06″W	1041190	Church of St Peter and St Paul More images
Church of St James	Chipping Warden and Edgcote, South Northamptonshire	Church	Early 13th century	4 February 1969	SP5050247906; 52°07′38″N 1°15′49″W	1041169	Church of St James More images
Church of St Peter and St Paul	Chipping Warden and Edgcote, South Northamptonshire	Church	Late 13th century	4 February 1969	SP4989248700; 52°08′04″N 1°16′21″W	1041206	Church of St Peter and St Paul More images
Edgcote House	Chipping Warden and Edgcote, South Northamptonshire	Country House	1748-54	11 September 1953	SP5053147958; 52°07′39″N 1°15′48″W	1041170	Edgcote House More images
Church of St Mary the Virgin	Whiston, Cogenhoe and Whiston, South Northamptonshire	Church	Early 16th century pre 1534	3 May 1968	SP8519360520; 52°14′11″N 0°45′14″W	1190018	Church of St Mary the Virgin More images
Church of St Peter and St Paul	Cosgrove, South Northamptonshire	Church	13th century	17 May 1960	SP7909242457; 52°04′29″N 0°50′51″W	1040847	Church of St Peter and St Paul More images
Church of All Saints	Croughton, South Northamptonshire	Parish Church	12th century	4 February 1969	SP5458333550; 51°59′52″N 1°12′23″W	1192503	Church of All Saints More images
Church of St Mary	Easton Neston Park, Easton Neston, South Northamptonshire	Church	13th century	17 May 1960	SP7021449182; 52°08′11″N 0°58′32″W	1189210	Church of St Mary More images
Easton Neston House, and Attached Wing	Easton Neston Park, Easton Neston, South Northamptonshire	House	c1685-1695	1 December 1951	SP7015749303; 52°08′15″N 0°58′35″W	1189225	Easton Neston House, and Attached Wing More images
Garden House at Easton Neston House	Easton Neston Park, Easton Neston, South Northamptonshire	Garden House	1641	1 December 1951	SP7031649449; 52°08′20″N 0°58′26″W	1040989	Upload Photo
Left Gatepier of Original Entry to West of Easton Neston House	Easton Neston Park, Easton Neston, South Northamptonshire	Gate Pier	Mid 17th century	1 December 1951	SP6989749348; 52°08′17″N 0°58′48″W	1040990	Upload Photo
Right Gatepier of Original Entry to West of Easton Neston House	Easton Neston Park, Easton Neston, South Northamptonshire	Gate Pier	Mid 17th century	1 December 1951	SP6990349304; 52°08′15″N 0°58′48″W	1294338	Upload Photo
Eydon Hall	Eydon, South Northamptonshire	Country House	1789-91	11 September 1953	SP5397849791; 52°08′38″N 1°12′45″W	1040463	Eydon Hall More images
Chapel of St Peter	Steane, Farthinghoe, South Northamptonshire	Chapel	13th century	4 February 1969	SP5545339020; 52°02′49″N 1°11′34″W	1371825	Upload Photo
Church of St Michael	Farthinghoe, South Northamptonshire	Church	1654	4 February 1969	SP5361939791; 52°03′14″N 1°13′10″W	1192622	Church of St Michael More images
Gayton Manor House	Gayton, South Northamptonshire	House	mid-late 16th century	1 December 1951	SP7056754833; 52°11′14″N 0°58′09″W	1293835	Gayton Manor House More images
Church of St Bartholomew	Greens Norton, South Northamptonshire	Church	Mid 10th century to 11th century	17 May 1960	SP6690849902; 52°08′36″N 1°01′25″W	1040874	Church of St Bartholomew More images
Church of Holy Trinity	Hinton-in-the-Hedges, South Northamptonshire	Church	12th century	4 February 1969	SP5580636941; 52°01′41″N 1°11′17″W	1040479	Church of Holy Trinity More images
Church of St Peter and St Paul	Kings Sutton, South Northamptonshire	Church	12th century	4 February 1969	SP4974836114; 52°01′16″N 1°16′35″W	1226135	Church of St Peter and St Paul More images
Church of St Luke	Kislingbury, South Northamptonshire	Parish Church	14th century	3 May 1968	SP6972159655; 52°13′50″N 0°58′50″W	1041048	Church of St Luke More images
Church of St Lawrence	Marston St. Lawrence, South Northamptonshire	Parish Church	13th century and 14th century	4 February 1969	SP5362242075; 52°04′28″N 1°13′09″W	1371489	Church of St Lawrence More images
Church of All Saints	Middleton Cheney, South Northamptonshire	Church	Early 14th century	4 February 1969	SP4985142032; 52°04′28″N 1°16′27″W	1371514	Church of All Saints More images
Church of St Guthlac	Passenham, Old Stratford, South Northamptonshire	Church	13th century	17 May 1960	SP7803139438; 52°02′52″N 0°51′49″W	1041642	Church of St Guthlac More images
Two Barns at the Manor House	Passenham, Old Stratford, South Northamptonshire	Barn	Early 17th century	1 December 1951	SP7798539514; 52°02′55″N 0°51′51″W	1293550	Upload Photo
The Chain Gate and Lodges and Attached Walls, Piers, Standards and Chains	Paulerspury, South Northamptonshire	Gate Lodge	1822-3	1 December 1951	SP7042947618; 52°07′21″N 0°58′22″W	1041106	The Chain Gate and Lodges and Attached Walls, Piers, Standards and Chains More images
Church of St Lawrence	Radstone, South Northamptonshire	Church	12th century	4 February 1969	SP5879340523; 52°03′36″N 1°08′38″W	1190302	Church of St Lawrence More images
The Monastery	Shutlanger, South Northamptonshire	Farmhouse	Early 14th century	1 December 1951	SP7311449973; 52°08′36″N 0°55′59″W	1189534	Upload Photo
Church of St Botolph	Slapton, South Northamptonshire	Church	Early 13th century	17 May 1960	SP6401246885; 52°07′00″N 1°04′00″W	1189807	Church of St Botolph More images
Sulgrave Manor House and attached Brewhouse	Sulgrave, South Northamptonshire	Farmhouse	Late 18th century	4 February 1969	SP5607945589; 52°06′21″N 1°10′57″W	1371865	Sulgrave Manor House and attached Brewhouse More images
Church of St Mary	Thenford, South Northamptonshire	Church	Late 12th century	4 February 1969	SP5189741533; 52°04′11″N 1°14′39″W	1371503	Church of St Mary More images
Thenford House	Thenford, South Northamptonshire	Country House	1761-5	11 September 1953	SP5218641797; 52°04′20″N 1°14′24″W	1190951	Thenford House More images
Church of St John the Baptist	Thorpe Mandeville, South Northamptonshire	Church	14th century	4 February 1969	SP5322044954; 52°06′01″N 1°13′28″W	1293503	Church of St John the Baptist More images
Church of St Lawrence	Towcester, South Northamptonshire	Church	13th century	17 May 1960	SP6941048704; 52°07′56″N 0°59′15″W	1371638	Church of St Lawrence More images
The Court Parlour	Yardley Hastings, South Northamptonshire	Cross Passage House	Late 14th century	3 May 1968	SP8661457091; 52°12′19″N 0°44′02″W	1190579	Upload Photo

== See also ==
- Grade II* listed buildings in Northamptonshire
