= Church of St Mary and All Saints =

Church of St Mary and All Saints may refer to:

- Church of St Mary and All Saints, Bingham, Nottinghamshire, England
- St Mary's and All Saints Church, Boxley, Kent, England
- St Mary's and All Saints' Church, Checkley, Staffordshire, England
- Church of St Mary and All Saints, Chesterfield, Derbyshire, England
- St Mary and All Saints' Church, Conwy, Wales
- Church of St Mary and All Saints, Droxford, Hampshire, England
- Church of St Mary and All Saints, Fotheringhay, Northamptonshire, England
- St Mary and All Saints' Church, Great Budworth, Cheshire, England
- Church of St Mary and All Saints, Hawksworth, Nottinghamshire, England
- St Mary & All Saints' Church, Holcot, Northamptonshire, England
- St Mary and All Saints' Church, Kidderminster, Worcestershire, England
- St Mary and All Saints, Little Walsingham, Norfolk, England
- Church of St Mary and All Saints, Whalley, Lancashire, England
- Church of St Mary and All Saints, Willoughby-on-the-Wolds, Nottinghamshire, England
