= Robert Woodford (diarist) =

English lawyer and diarist (1606–1654)

Robert Woodford (3 April 1606 – 15 November 1654) was an English lawyer, best known for an extensive diary that covers the period 1637–1641. He expresses the views of a Puritan travelling just before the English Civil War.

== Early life, family and career ==
Robert Woodford was born at Old, Northamptonshire on 3 April 1606, a son of Robert Woodford and his wife Jane Dexter. He was educated at Brixworth and trained as an attorney by John Reading, a barrister at Inner Temple.

In 1635, Robert married Hannah Haunch (1617–1699) at All Hallows, London Wall, the daughter of Robert Haunch and his wife Susanna Heighes. The couple had 14 children, but many failed to survive to adulthood.

Robert practised as a lawyer in Northampton, London and elsewhere, and served as Steward of Northampton from 1635 onwards.

== Writings ==
Robert is remarkable as a diarist. Only one manuscript of his writings appears to survive, but it provides insight into the experiences and world view of a devout Puritan who travelled between London and the Midlands during the years leading up to the English Civil War. Bound as a single volume running from 20 August 1637 to 16 August 1641, it is currently held by New College, Oxford (NCA 9502). It appears from annotations on its cover to be one of a series of diaries kept by the author. The diary contains 588 pages and some 89,000 words. The subject matter includes accounts of the author's family events and business activities, along with extensive comments and reflections of a spiritual nature.

== Later life ==
Robert died at Northampton on 15 November 1654 and was buried there at All Saints' Church two days later. He left no will, administration of his estate being granted in the following year to his widow Hannah. One of their descendants was James Woodforde, another noted diarist.
