= Gayton Manor House =

Manor house in Northamptonshire, England

Coordinates: 52.1872°N 0.9692°W

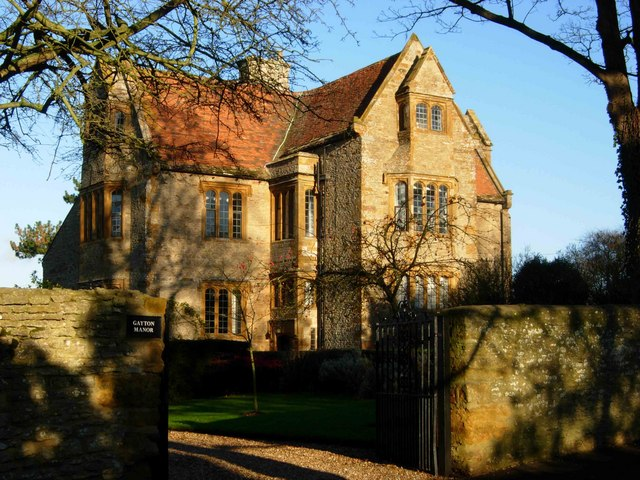
Gayton Manor House

Gayton Manor House is a manor house in Gayton, England. It is a Grade I listed building in West Northamptonshire.

The manor is mentioned in the reign of Henry II when it was in the possession of Bethune. He was succeeded by Baldwin of Bethune, who sold it, with the advowson of the church, to Ingelram, Lord of Fienles during the reign of Henry III in 1249. Ingelram obtained a licence to enclose Gayton Wood and include it into a park in 1259. The manor passed to Michael de Houghton of Northampton, who obtained a grant of free warren for himself and his heirs; and during the reign of Edward II, in 1316, Thomas Murdak and his wife, Scolastica de Meux, were certified to be lords of Gayton. From their descendants, the manor passed to the family of Trussell, and during the reign of Henry VI, in 1446, Robert Tanfield, levied a fine against it, together with the advowson of the church. Sir Francis Tanfield sold them in 1607 to Sir William Samwell, who died seized of them during the reign of Charles I in 1628. In 1751, they were again sold by Sir Thomas Samwell to Richard Kent. His son and successor of the same name disposed of the entire estate. The manor was purchased in 1755 by James Hawley, M.D., whose great-grandson, Sir Joseph Henry Hawley, the third baronet, was a subsequent proprietor. Certain lands were formerly in the possession of the family of De Gayton, and called "Gayton's Manor." Gayton was annexed to Grafton in 1541. The manor house, now reduced to a farmhouse, stands at the northern entrance to the village. The architectural style is that of the reigns of Elizabeth and James I.
