= St John the Baptist's Church, East Farndon =

Church in Northamptonshire, England

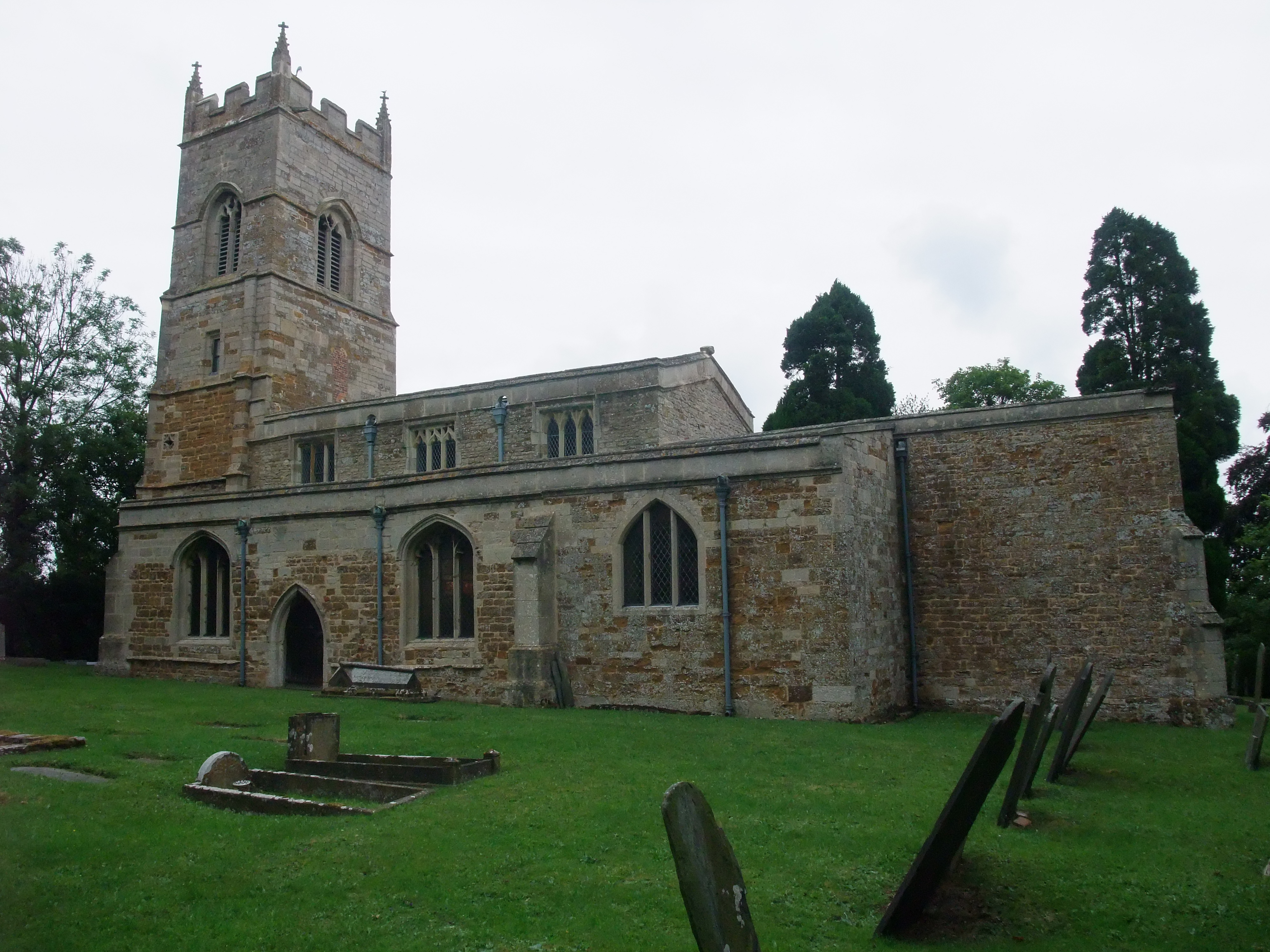
- St John the Baptist's Church, East Farndon
- 52.4561°N 0.9472°W
- Denomination: Church of England
- Website: http://www.faxtongroup.org.uk/stjohnthebaptist.htm

Administration
- Province: Canterbury
- Diocese: Diocese of Peterborough
- Archdeaconry: Northampton
- Deanery: Brixworth

Clergy
- Rector: Rev Canon Mary Garbutt

St John the Baptist's Church is an Anglican church, the parish church of East Farndon, Northamptonshire. It is a Grade I listed building and stands in the centre of the village of East Farndon.

There is no reference to a church or priest in the entry for the parish in the Domesday Book, which was compiled in 1086. This may indicate the absence of a church building at that stage or, alternatively, only the absence of a resident priest.

The main structure of the present building was erected in the 13th and 14th centuries. The church consists of a nave, chancel, south aisle and west tower. A detailed description appears on the Historic England website

East Farndon is part of a "united benefice" along with Arthingworth, Harrington and Oxendon. Each parish retains its own church building.

== Registers ==
The parish registers survive from 1562 and, apart from those currently in use, are kept at Northamptonshire Record Office. Details of its location and opening times can be found on the Record Office website.
