= St Peter & St Paul's Church, Watford =

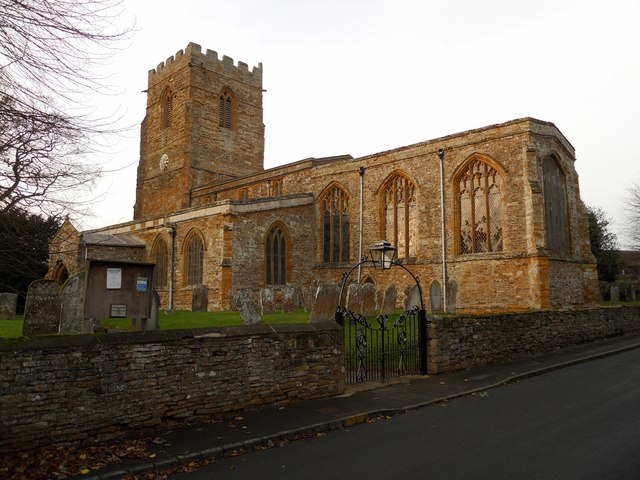
- St Peter & St Paul's Church, Watford
- 52.3161°N 1.1164°W
- Denomination: Church of England
- Website: http://watfordvillage.weebly.com/the-church-of-stpeter-and-stpaul.html

Administration
- Province: Canterbury
- Diocese: Diocese of Peterborough
- Archdeaconry: Northampton
- Deanery: Brixworth

Clergy
- Vicar: Rev Graham Collingridge

St Peter & St Paul's Church is an Anglican Church and the parish church of Watford, Northamptonshire. It is a Grade I listed building and stands on the west side of the Church Street.

There is no reference to a church or priest in the entry for Watford in the Domesday Book.

The main structure of the present building was erected in the 14th and 15th centuries, with further work in the 18th and 19th centuries. The church now consists of a nave, north and south aisles, chancel with north chapel, north and south porches and a west tower. A detailed description appears on the Historic England website.

The parish registers survive from 1565, the historic registers being deposited at Northamptonshire Record Office.

Watford is part of a united Benefice along with Long Buckby, West Haddon and Winwick. Each parish retains its own church building.
