= St Mary Magdalene, Geddington =

Coordinates: 52.437893°N 0.684494°W

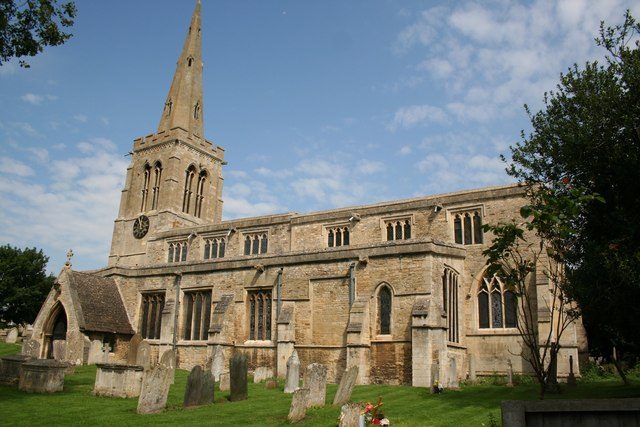
- St Mary Magdalene, Geddington
- OS grid reference: SP 89524 83027
- Country: England
- Denomination: Church of England

History
- Dedication: St Mary Magdalene

Architecture
- Heritage designation: Grade I listed

Specifications
- Materials: ironstone

Administration
- Diocese: Diocese of Peterborough
- Archdeaconry: Oakham
- Deanery: Kettering
- Parish: Geddington

St Mary Magdalene is a Church of England church in Geddington, Northamptonshire, England. It is a grade I listed building. In 2017 it was wrongly thought to be the Shrine of Hagius until the belief was found to be based on an error in transcription.

The east windows were created by Sir Ninian Comper. He also designed windows for Westminster Abbey and the entirety of the Church of St Mary the Virgin, Wellingborough, amongst many others. The central East window was created in the early part of his illustrious career while the South East window is much later, and there are vast changes in style in the intervening 50 years.
