= Burton Latimer Hall =

Manor house in Burton Latimer, Northamptonshire, England

Coordinates: 52.3682°N 0.6818°W

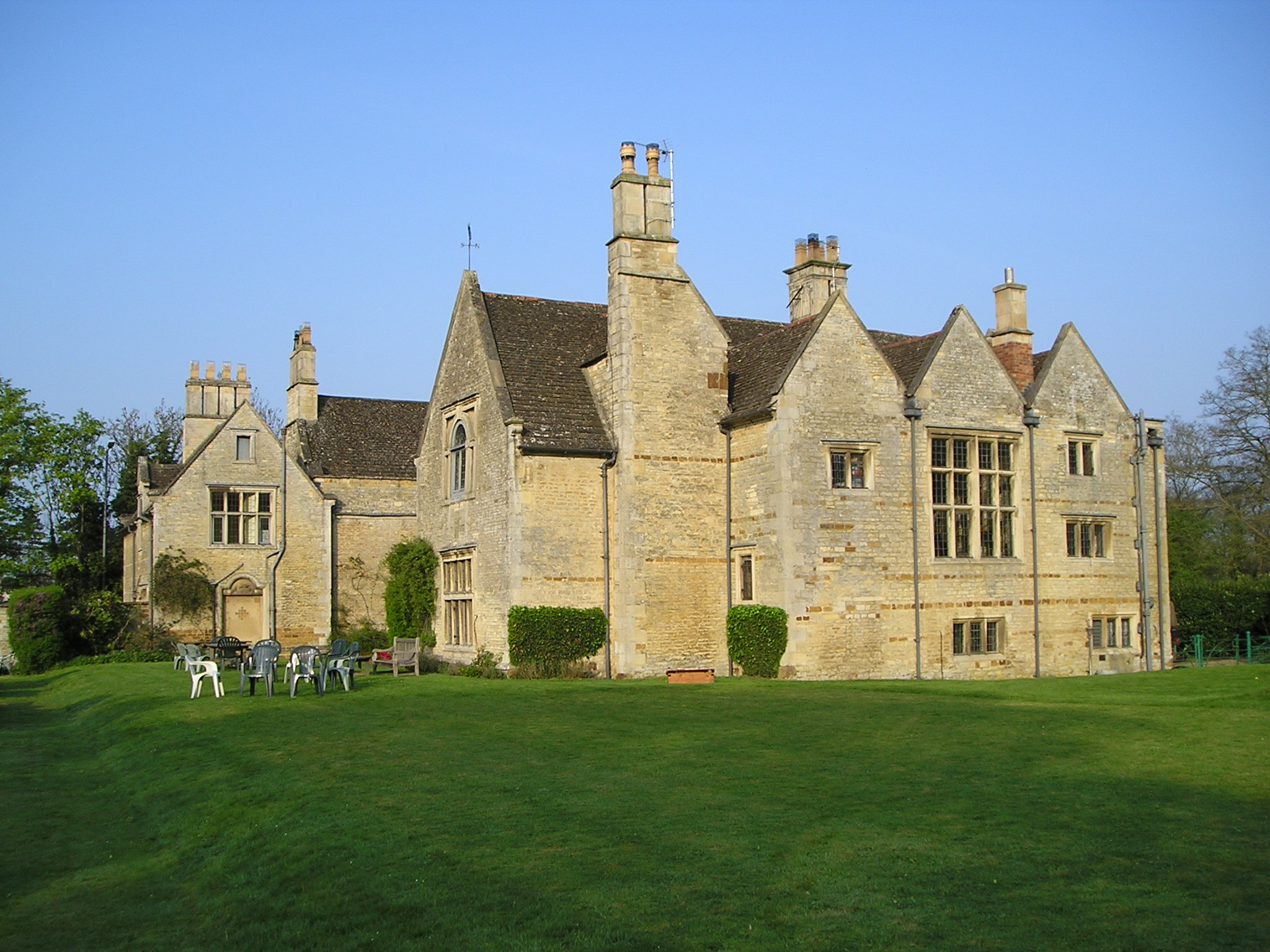
Burton Latimer Hall

Burton Latimer Hall is an Elizabethan manor house in the village of Burton Latimer, Northamptonshire. It is a Grade I listed building.

The Hall, probably of medieval origin, was remodelled and enlarged in the early 17th century. The west front dates from the mid-18th century and the south wing from 1872. It is built of coursed limestone rubble with an ashlar west front and a Collyweston stone slate roof. In plan it consists of a main block with two cross-wings and an additional wing to the south.

The manor of Burton Latimer, one of two Burton manors, belonged in earlier times to the Latimer family. After passing into the hands of the Bacon family the 17th-century refurbishment was carried out by Edmund Bacon c.1620. The Lordship was eventually bought in 1760 by John Harpur, who soon afterwards combined it with the other Burton manor. The Hall and its surrounding estate have belonged to the Harpur family ever since.

In the grounds stand a Grade II* listed dovecote and a Grade II listed stable block.
