= St Lawrence's Church, Marston St Lawrence =

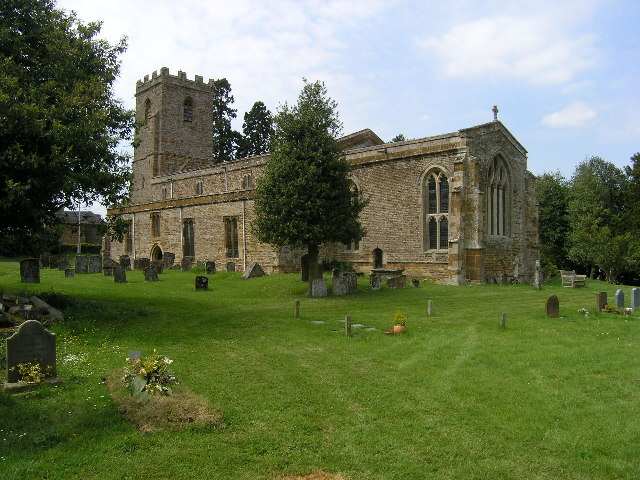
- St Lawrence's Church, Marston St Lawrence
- 52°04′28″N 1°13′09″W
- Location: Marston St. Lawrence, Northamptonshire, England
- Denomination: Church of England

Administration
- Province: Canterbury
- Diocese: Peterborough
- Archdeaconry: Northampton

St Lawrence's Church, is the parish church of Marston St. Lawrence, Northamptonshire, England. It is a Grade I listed building.

The parish is a member of the Chenderit Benefice, which includes the parishes of Chacombe, Greatworth, Middleton Cheney, Thenford and Warkworth.

== Architecture ==
Much of the architecture is Decorated Gothic, including the chancel arch and the arcades to both the north and south aisles. The north arcade is of four bays and was built in the 13th century. The Perpendicular Gothic east window of the chancel was added in the second half of the 14th century. One of the aisles was also rebuilt in Perpendicular Gothic, and the bell tower was added late in the Perpendicular period (15th or early 16th century). There are two carved wooden screens: a Perpendicular one to the north chapel and a very well-carved Jacobean one of about 1610 to the tower.

== Organ ==
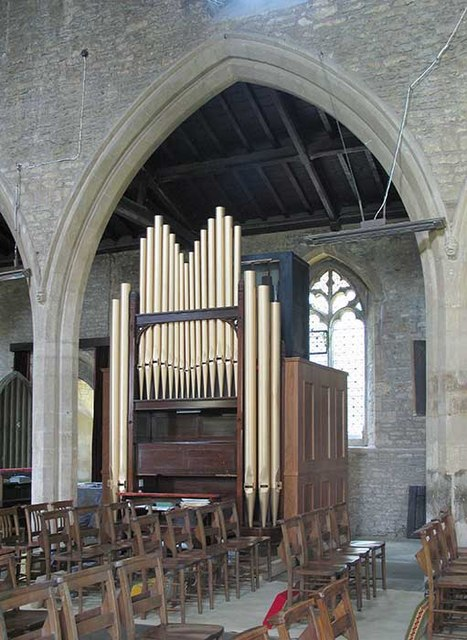
The organ

There is a 20th-century organ made by the Manchester builder Jardine and Co. It was relocated to Marston St Lawrence at the beginning of the 21st century. Its original home was in Skelmersdale.

== Conservation ==
The building was listed in 1969.

== Sources ==
- Pevsner, Nikolaus; Cherry, Bridget (1973) [1961]. Northamptonshire. The Buildings of England. Harmondsworth: Penguin Books. pp. 302–303. ISBN 0-14-071022-1.
