= Ashley, Northamptonshire =

Village in Northamptonshire, England

Coordinates: 52.50°N 00.83°W

Ashley
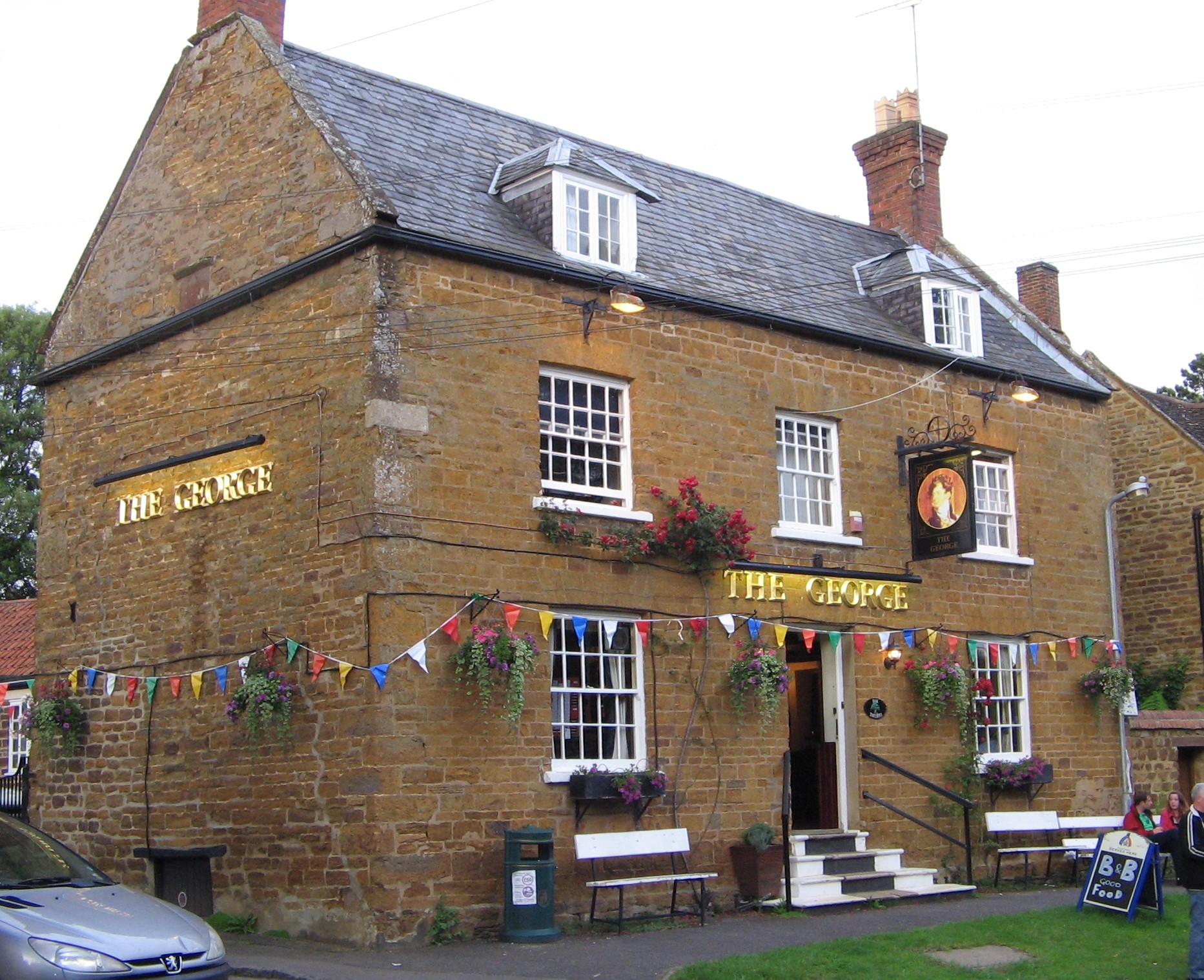
- The George public house, Ashley

- Location within Northamptonshire
- Population: 224 (2011 Census)
- OS grid reference: SP7990
  - London: 92 miles (148 km) SSE
- Civil parish: Ashley
- Unitary authority: North Northamptonshire
- Ceremonial county: Northamptonshire
- Region: East Midlands
- Country: England
- Sovereign state: United Kingdom
- Post town: MARKET HARBOROUGH
- Postcode district: LE16
- Dialling code: 01858
- Police: Northamptonshire
- Fire: Northamptonshire
- Ambulance: East Midlands
- UK Parliament: Kettering

Ashley is a village and civil parish in North Northamptonshire, England, about 4 miles (6.4 km) northeast of Market Harborough, Leicestershire and 5 miles (8.0 km) west of Corby. The population of the civil parish at the 2011 Census was 224, an increase from 217 at the 2001 Census. The village is near the River Welland, which forms the border with Leicestershire. The Roman road called Via Devana in the part from Ratae (now Leicester) to Duroliponte (now Cambridge) ran just north of the village.

The village's name means 'ash-tree wood/clearing'.

== Notable buildings ==
The village church is dedicated to St Mary the Virgin and was mostly rebuilt by Sir George Gilbert Scott at a cost of £2,000 in 1867 for the Rev Richard Pulteney, rector 1853-74 and also the Squire.

The Manor House was also remodelled for Pulteney by Edmund Francis Law in 1865. Pulteney also got Scott to build a Gothic village school (1858) and Masters House (1865)

== Roman villa ==
The remains were found in Alderstone field in the 19th century during railway construction of the line from Market Harborough to Peterborough and Stamford just north of the village, which had its own station (Ashley and Weston railway station). The site was close to the Roman Road from Leicester to Cambridge. Excavations in 1969-71 show a villa and outbuildings close to the road.

== Village events ==
Every Easter Monday there is a tug of war match against the neighbouring village of Medbourne.
