= Church of St Mary the Virgin, Ashley =

Church in Northamptonshire, England

Coordinates: 52°30′40″N 0°49′52″W

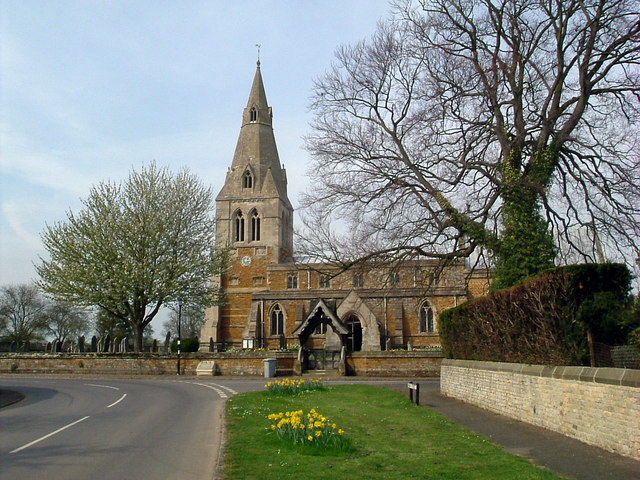
- Church of St Mary the Virgin, Ashley
- Denomination: Church of England

History
- Dedication: St Mary the Virgin

Administration
- Diocese: Peterborough
- Deanery: Corby
- Parish: Ashley

Clergy
- Vicar: Eddie Culbert

The Church of St Mary the Virgin is a church in Ashley, Northamptonshire.

== History ==
The church is of 13th-century origin and is made of local Northamptonshire ironstone and limestone. It is Grade I listed. The church is known for its tower and broach spire.

The Revd Richard Pulteney refurbished and restored the church, under the guidance of Sir George Gilbert Scott, in 1864–1866. Pulteney also built a school and a schoolmaster's house.

The main part of the church was refurnished and restored with hand-carved, oak pews, pulpit and priest's desk. The pews are decorated with foliate carvings.

The church has a marble, alabaster, semi-precious stone and gold leaf decorated chancel designed by Clayton and Bell, who also designed the stained-glass windows. The church has been described by Historic England as "an outstanding example of Victorian Gothic style at its height". There is a painted barrel ceiling which is like the ceiling at Peterborough Cathedral. The church also has some chandeliers made by George Bodley.
