= East Farndon =

Village in Northamptonshire, England

Coordinates: 52.458°N 0.946°W

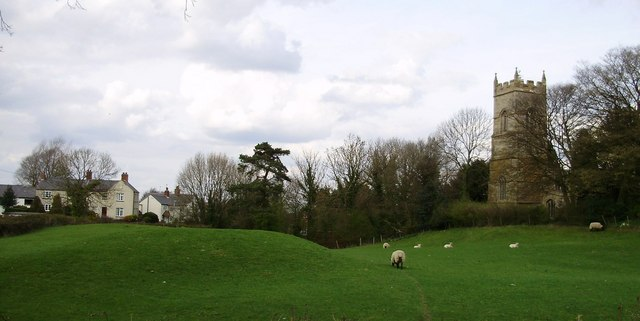

- Location within Northamptonshire
- Population: 307 (2011)
- OS grid reference: SP7185
- Unitary authority: West Northamptonshire
- Ceremonial county: Northamptonshire
- Region: East Midlands
- Country: England
- Sovereign state: United Kingdom
- Post town: Market Harborough
- Postcode district: LE16
- Dialling code: 01858
- Police: Northamptonshire
- Fire: Northamptonshire
- Ambulance: East Midlands
- UK Parliament: Kettering

East Farndon is a small linear village and civil parish about one mile south of Market Harborough in West Northamptonshire, England. The village is close to the border with Leicestershire, and has a Leicestershire post code and telephone dialling code. At the time of the 2001 census, the parish's population was 258 people, increasing to 307 at the 2011 census.

The villages name means 'Ferny hill'.

The village is mentioned in the Domesday Book of 1086. In a field on the west side of the parish is the Judith Stone. This is a glacial erratic, brought from probably hundreds of miles away during an ice age. It is thought to take its name from the Countess Judith, niece of William the Conqueror. She is recorded in the Domesday Book as holding land in the parish, so perhaps the stone marked a boundary of some kind.

The church stands at the top of a hill and the village street runs down the hill quite steeply from there towards the town of Market Harborough. The church dates mainly from the 13th and 14th centuries and has a fine tower which can be seen for some miles around.

King Charles's army came through the village and occupied the ridge to the south of the church before its defeat at the Battle of Naseby in 1645.

== Notable buildings ==
The Historic England website contains details of a total of six listed buildings in the parish of East Farndon, all of which are Grade II apart from St John the Baptist's Church, which is Grade I. They include:

- St John the Baptist's Church
- East Farndon Hall, Back Road
- Home Farmhouse, Back Road
- Kiln Yard, Marston Lane
- The Manor House, Back Road
