= Old, Northamptonshire =

Village in Northamptonshire, England

Coordinates: 52.3540°N 0.8489°W

Old
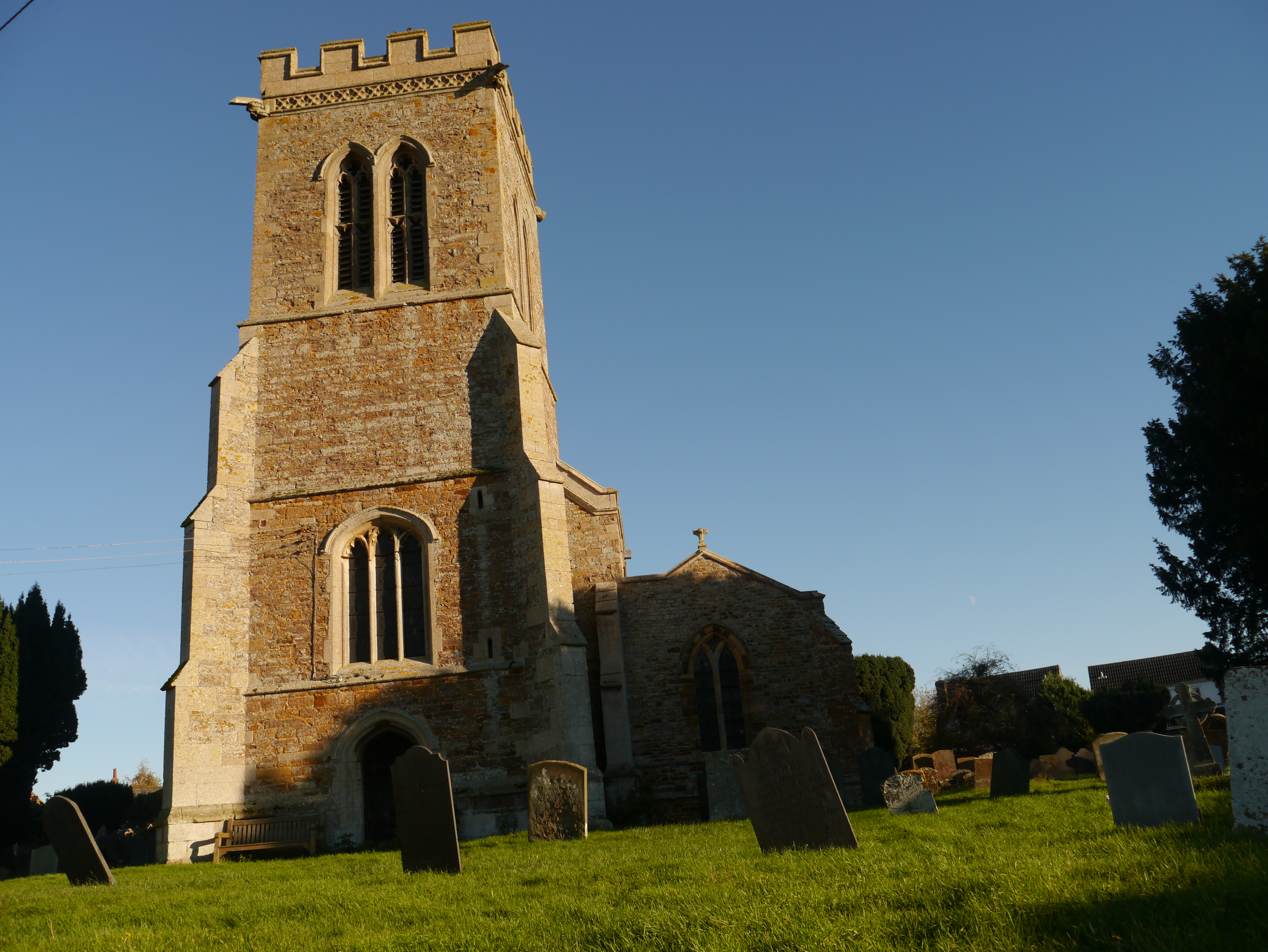
- Church tower of St Andrew's, Old

- Location within Northamptonshire
- Population: 490 (2011)
- OS grid reference: SP7873
- Unitary authority: West Northamptonshire
- Ceremonial county: Northamptonshire
- Region: East Midlands
- Country: England
- Sovereign state: United Kingdom
- Post town: Northampton
- Postcode district: NN6
- Dialling code: 01604
- Police: Northamptonshire
- Fire: Northamptonshire
- Ambulance: East Midlands
- UK Parliament: Kettering

Old (previously Wold and before that Wolde) is a village and civil parish in West Northamptonshire, England. At the time of the 2001 census, the parish's population was 308 people, and the population increased to 490 at the 2011 Census.

Old is near the village of Walgrave, and has a church, village hall, pub and park. It was once home to the haulage company Knights of Old, but they were later based in Kettering. As with many villages, the number of farms has decreased; two shops, a blacksmith, a butcher and a second pub also disappeared.

== History ==
The village's name means 'High forest'.

Old is an ancient community, known in 1086 as Walda in the ancient domesday hundred of Mawsley.

The village was the beneficiary of a large legacy left to it by the Rev. John Tounson, a previous rector of the parish several hundred years ago, and each year various needy residents of the village receive supplements. In 1971, it was reported that the small plot of land bequeathed by the Rev. Tounson had been sold for £238,000.

Robert Woodford, the noted 17th-century diarist, was born in Old in 1606, a son of Robert Woodford and his wife Jane Dexter. He appears to have grown up in the parish.

== Notable buildings ==
The Historic England website contains details of a total of 19 listed buildings (all Grade II, apart from St Andrew's Church which is Grade I) and one scheduled monument at or in the vicinity of Old. Amongst them are:

- St Andrew's Church, Church Lane
- Corner House, Bridle Road
- Dial House, Faxton End
- Faxton House, Faxton End
- The Old Rectory, Harrington Road
- Wold Farmhouse, Harrington Road
- The Brewery House, Harrington Road
- Kites Hall, Mill Lane
- Old Lodge, Mill Lane
- Manor House, Walgrave Road

== Notable former residents ==
Lancelot Driffield, sportsman and son of the local vicar
