= Holcot =

Village in Northamptonshire, England

Coordinates: 52.3179°N 0.8351°W

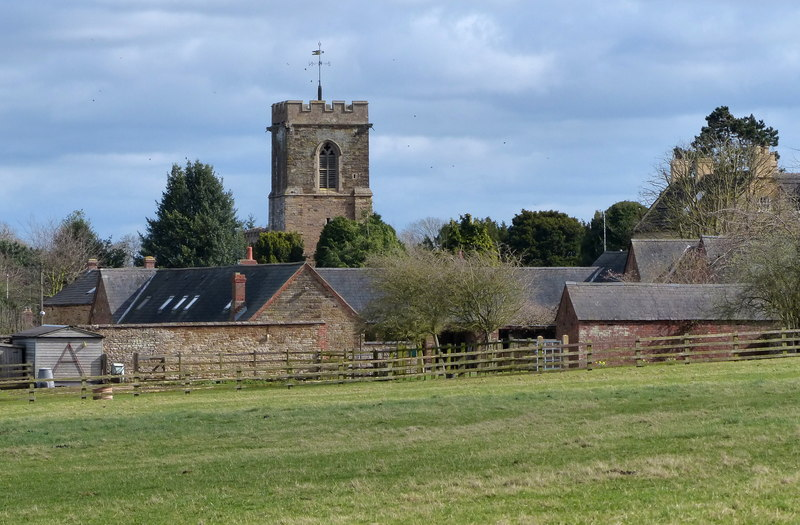

- Location within Northamptonshire
- Population: 438
- OS grid reference: SP7969
- Unitary authority: West Northamptonshire
- Ceremonial county: Northamptonshire
- Region: East Midlands
- Country: England
- Sovereign state: United Kingdom
- Post town: Northampton
- Postcode district: NN6
- Dialling code: 01604
- Police: Northamptonshire
- Fire: Northamptonshire
- Ambulance: East Midlands
- UK Parliament: Kettering

Holcot is a village and civil parish in the West Northamptonshire in England. At the time of the 2001 census, the parish's population was 399 people. At the 2011 census this had increased to 438 people, living in 182 households.

The villages name means 'Cottages in the hollows'.

== Notable buildings ==
The Historic England website contains details of a total of ten listed buildings in the parish of Holcot, all of which are Grade II except for St Mary and All Saints' Church which is Grade I. They are:

- St Mary and All Saints' Church, Main Street
- Polly's Cottage, Back Lane
- War Memorial, Back Lane
- The Old Rectory, Brixworth Road
- Churchyard Cross, Main Street
- Hollybush Farmhouse, Poplar Lane
- Poplar Farm, Poplar Lane
- Manor House, Rectory Lane
- Brook Cottage & Wall Dene, Sywell Road
- Ivy House, Sywell Road

== See also ==
- Robert Holcot (born in Holcot)
