= All Saints' Church, Middleton Cheney =

Grade I listed church in Northamptonshire, England

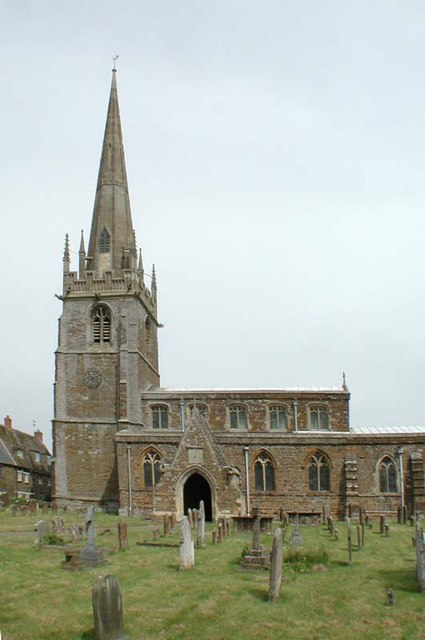
- All Saints' Church, Middleton Cheney
- 52.0744°N 1.2740°W
- Denomination: Church of England
- Website: https://allsaints-mc.church/

Administration
- Province: Canterbury
- Diocese: Peterborough

Clergy
- Rector: Rev Nick Leggett

The Church of All Saints is the Church of England parish church of Middleton Cheney, Northamptonshire, England. It has been listed Grade I.

== Architecture ==
The building is early 14th-century Decorated Gothic. The nave has a clerestory, north and south aisles and four-bay arcades.

The west tower and spire are later Medieval Perpendicular Gothic additions. The top of the spire is about 150 feet (46 m) above ground. In the 18th century the spire survived three lightning strikes: in 1720, 1794 and 1797.

== Restoration ==
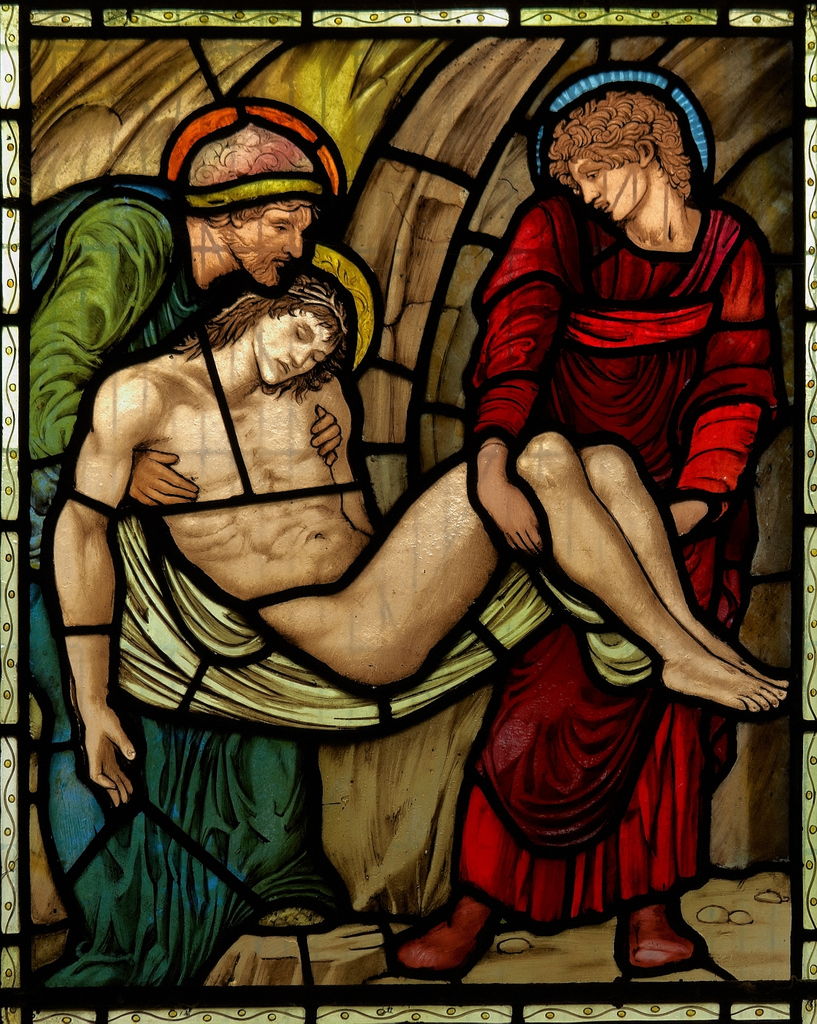
Detail of All Saints' chancel north window designed by Edward Burne-Jones, depicting Christ being laid in his tomb

All Saints was restored under the direction of George Gilbert Scott in 1865. During the restoration notable stained-glass windows were added that were designed by the Pre-Raphaelite artists William Morris, Philip Webb, Edward Burne-Jones, Ford Madox Brown and Simeon Solomon and made by Morris & Co. There are also mosaics made by James Powell and Sons, one of which was designed by Henry Holiday.

== People associated with All Saints ==
William Edington was Rector 1322–35. He was consecrated Bishop of Winchester in 1345.

All Saints' churchyard has a number of historic grave monuments:

- Four 17th-century English Baroque headstones and two 18th-century chest tombs are Grade II listed.

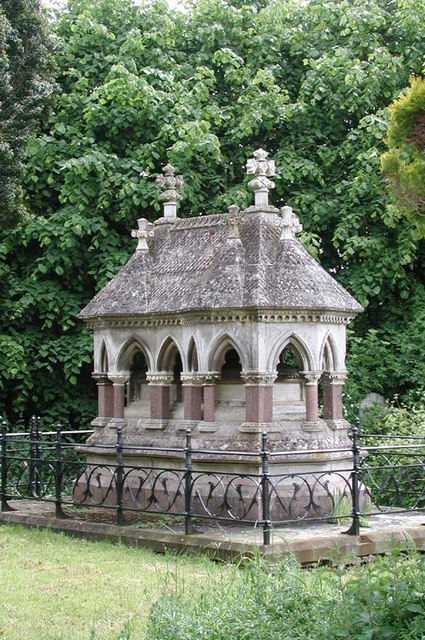
Horton family mausoleum, designed by William Wilkinson and made by Thomas Earp in 1866–67

- The Horton family mausoleum is a Gothic Revival monument designed by William Wilkinson and made by Thomas Earp in 1866–67. It is not listed.

== Sources ==
- Lewis, Samuel, ed. (1931) [1848]. A Topographical Dictionary of England (Seventh ed.). London: Samuel Lewis. pp. 306–310.
- Pevsner, Nikolaus; Cherry, Bridget (revision) (1973) [1961]. Northamptonshire. The Buildings of England (2nd ed.). Harmondsworth: Penguin Books. ISBN 0-14-071022-1.
