= St Andrew's Church, Old, Northamptonshire =

Church in Northamptonshire, England

Coordinates: 52.350550°N 0.848304°W

St Andrew’s Church, Old
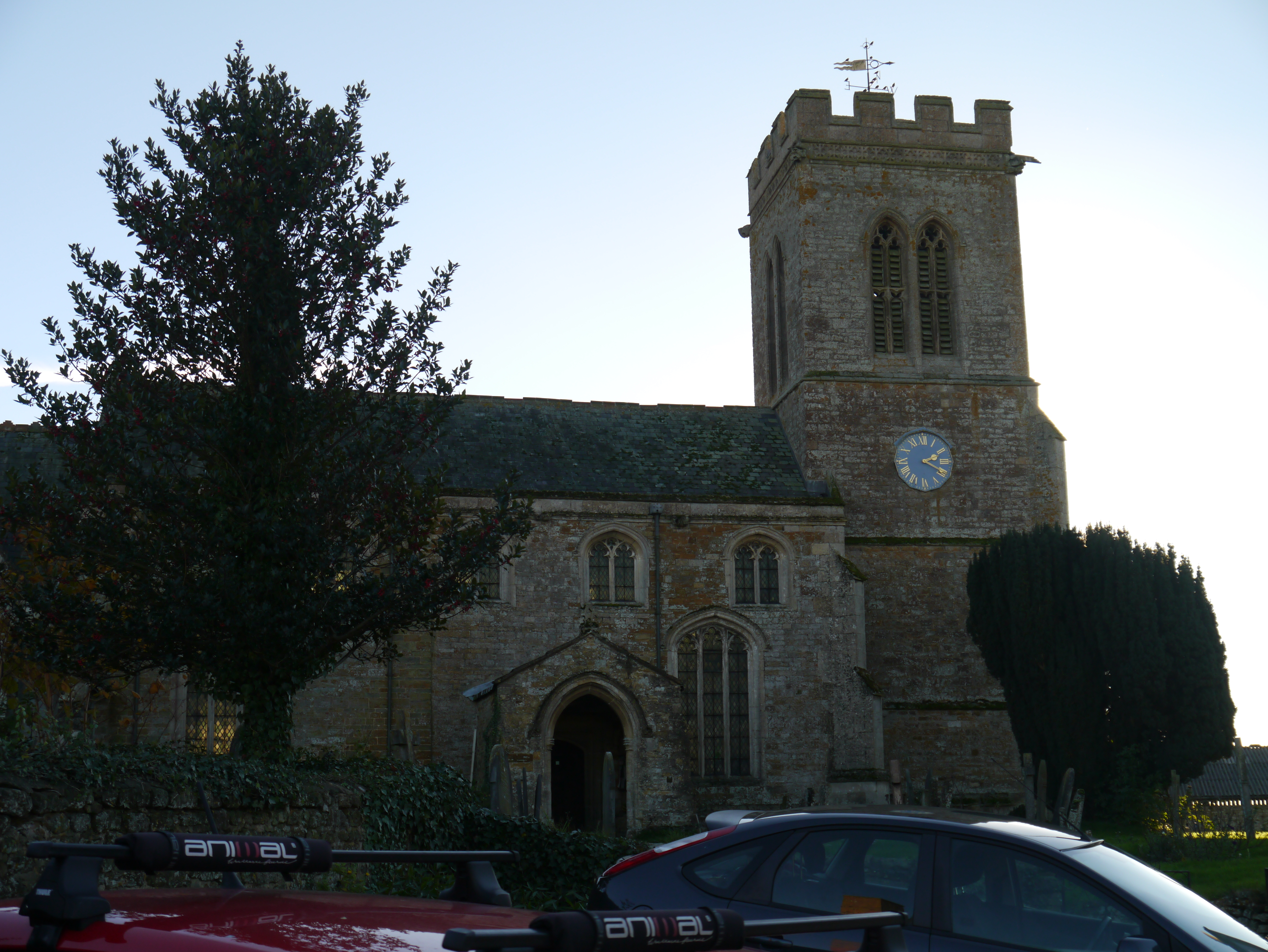
- St Andrew’s Church, Old
- Denomination: Church of England
- Website: www.st-andrews-old.co.uk

Administration
- Province: Canterbury
- Diocese: Peterborough
- Archdeaconry: Northampton
- Deanery: Brixworth

Clergy
- Rector: The Revd Canon Karen Jongman

St Andrew's Church is an Anglican church and the parish church of Old, Northamptonshire. It is a Grade I listed building and stands at Church Lane, on the south side of the village.

There is no reference to a church or priest in the entry for the parish in the Domesday Book, which was compiled in 1086. This may indicate the absence of a church building at that stage or, alternatively, only the absence of a resident priest.

Most of the current church building was erected in the 13th and 14th centuries and is constructed of square coursed lias with ashlar dressings and a slate roof. There is a chancel, a clerestoried nave of four bays with a south aisle, north porch and west tower. The chancel arch is of 15th-century construction, when it appears that significant further work was carried out such as the addition of the clerestory and porch as well as widening of the aisle.

A monument whose Latin inscription commemorates Alexander Ibbs, a rector of the parish who died in 1606, is set in the north wall of the chancel.

The church was extensively restored in 1874–5. Alterations at that time included the creation of a vestry and an organ chamber, both leading from the chancel, provision of a barrel roof to the chancel, a new roof to the aisle, removal of a west gallery and alterations to some of the windows.

The parish registers survive from 1559, the historic registers being deposited at Northamptonshire Record Office.

Old is part of a united benefice which also includes the parishes of Hannington, Scaldwell and Walgrave with each village retaining its own church.

== Photo gallery ==
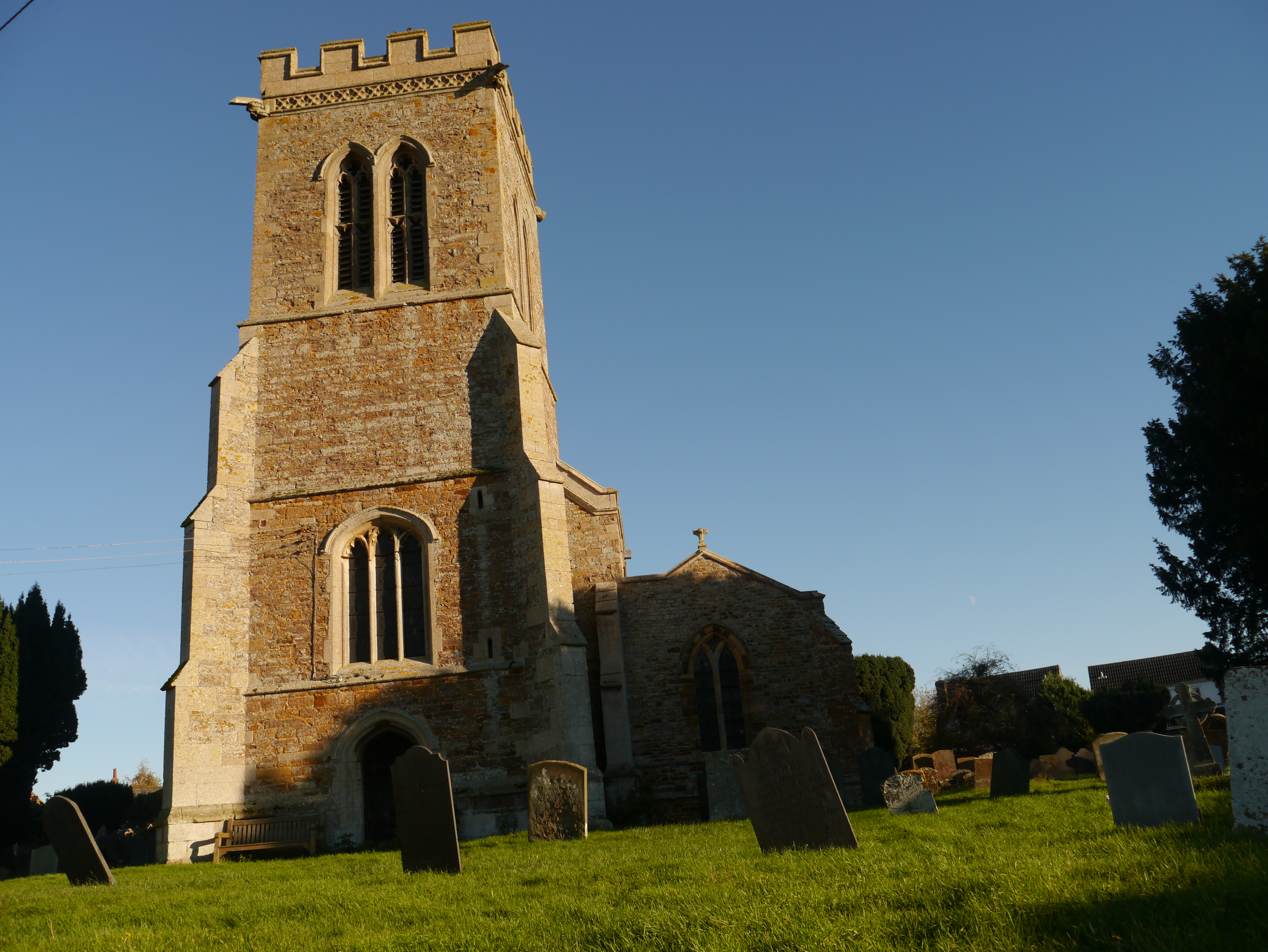
Church tower

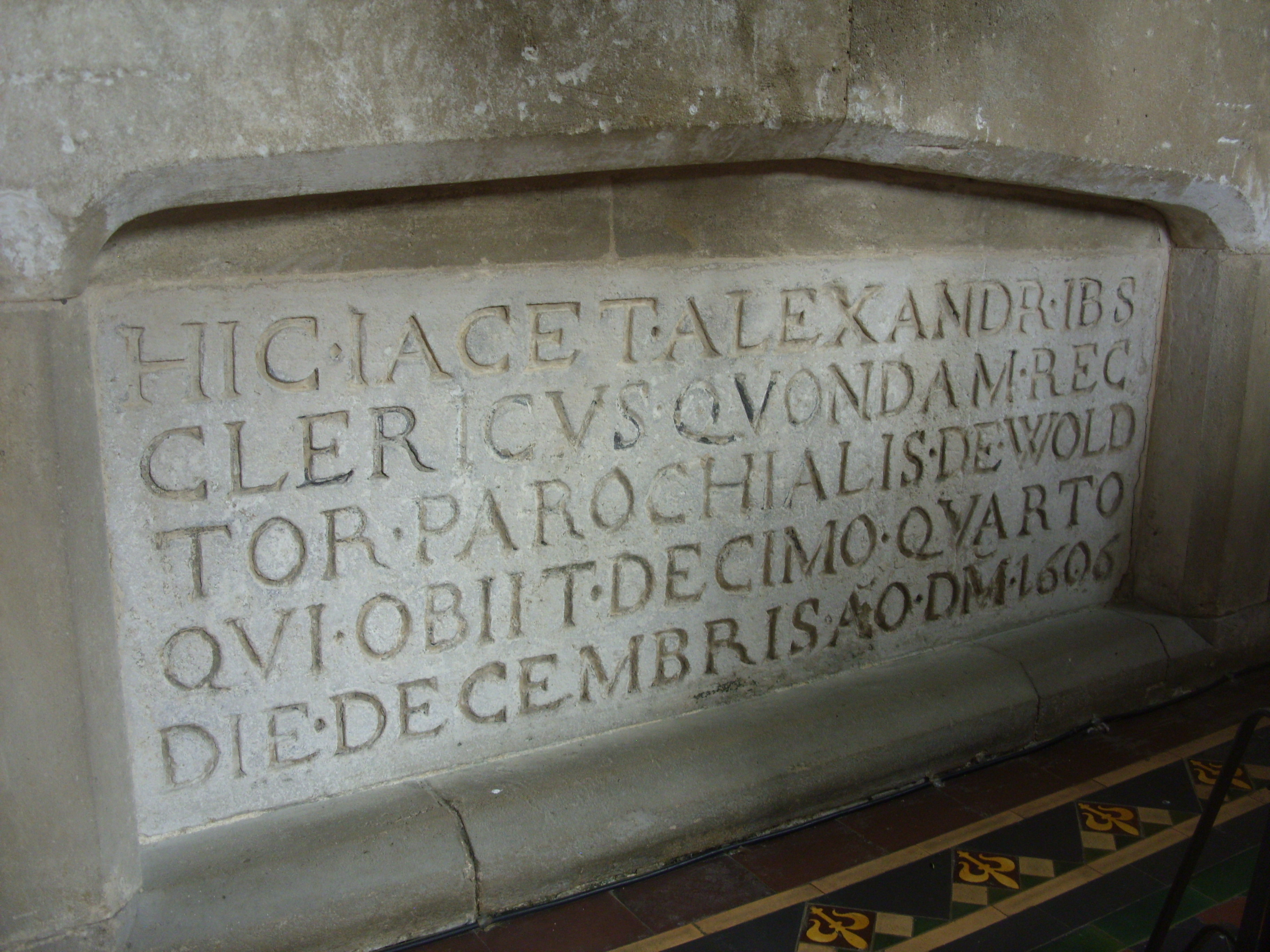
Monument to Alexander Ibbs, 1606

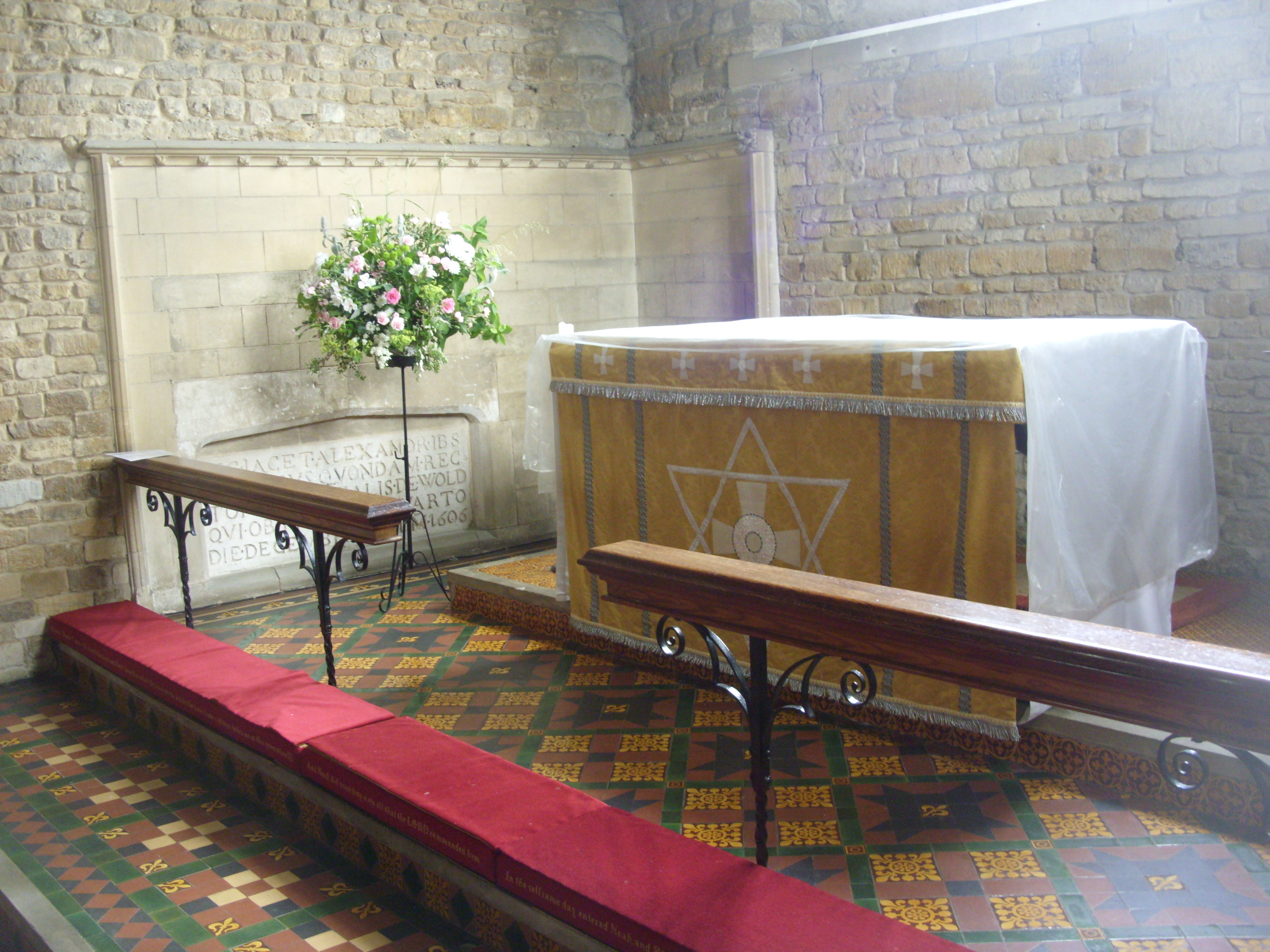
Chancel

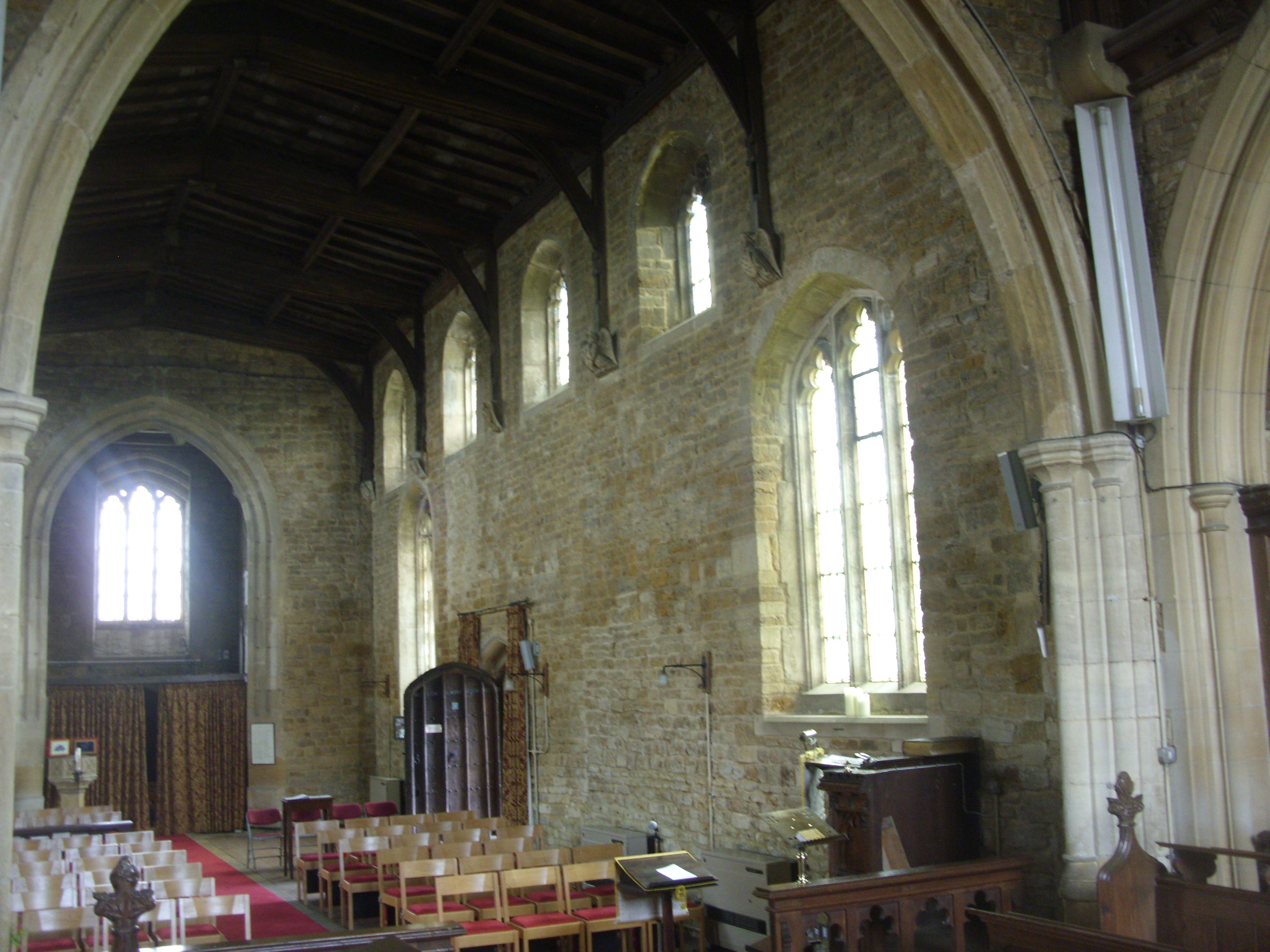
Nave looking south-west

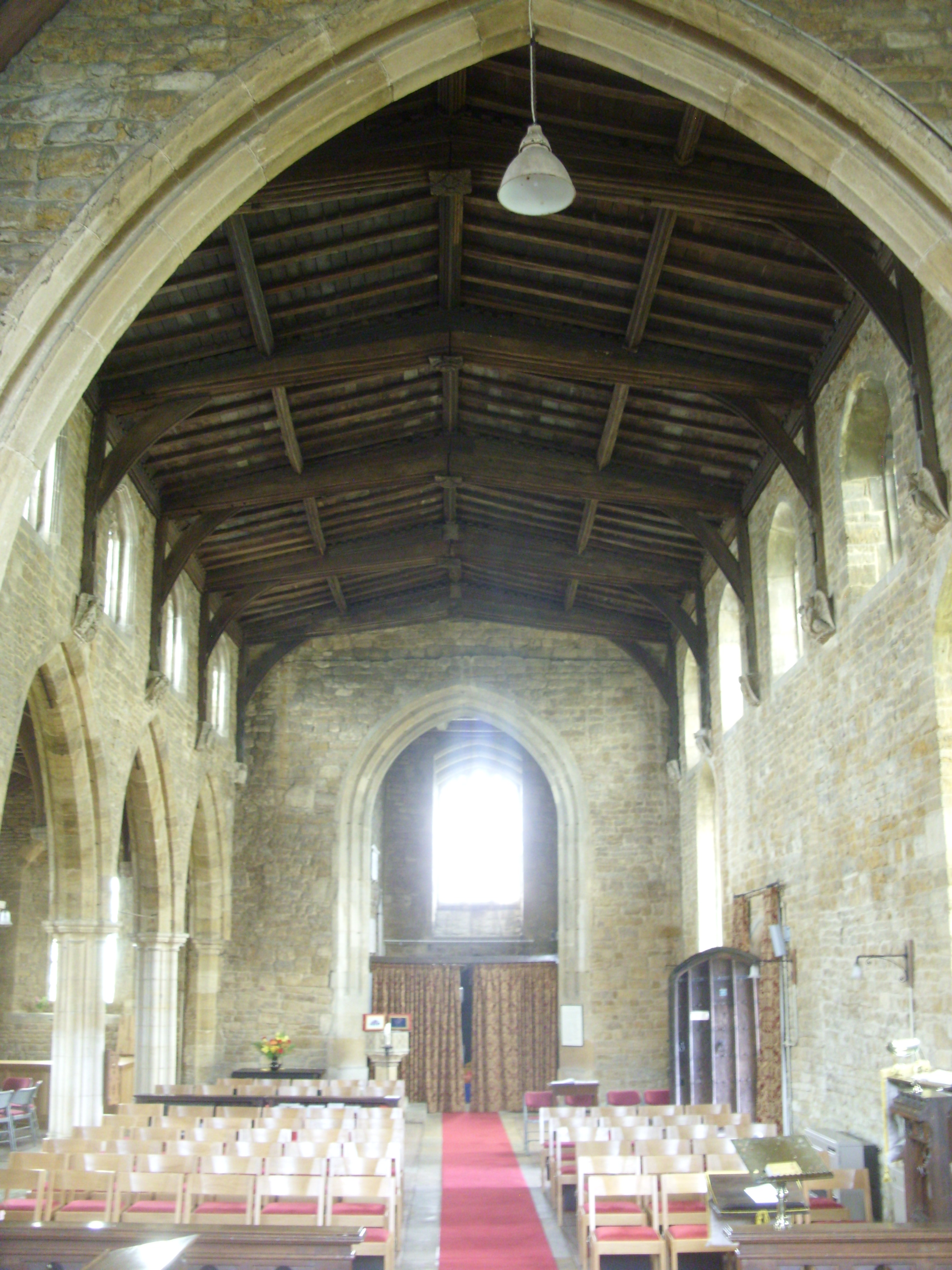
Nave looking west
