= Church of St Mary and All Saints, Fotheringhay =

Church in Northamptonshire, England

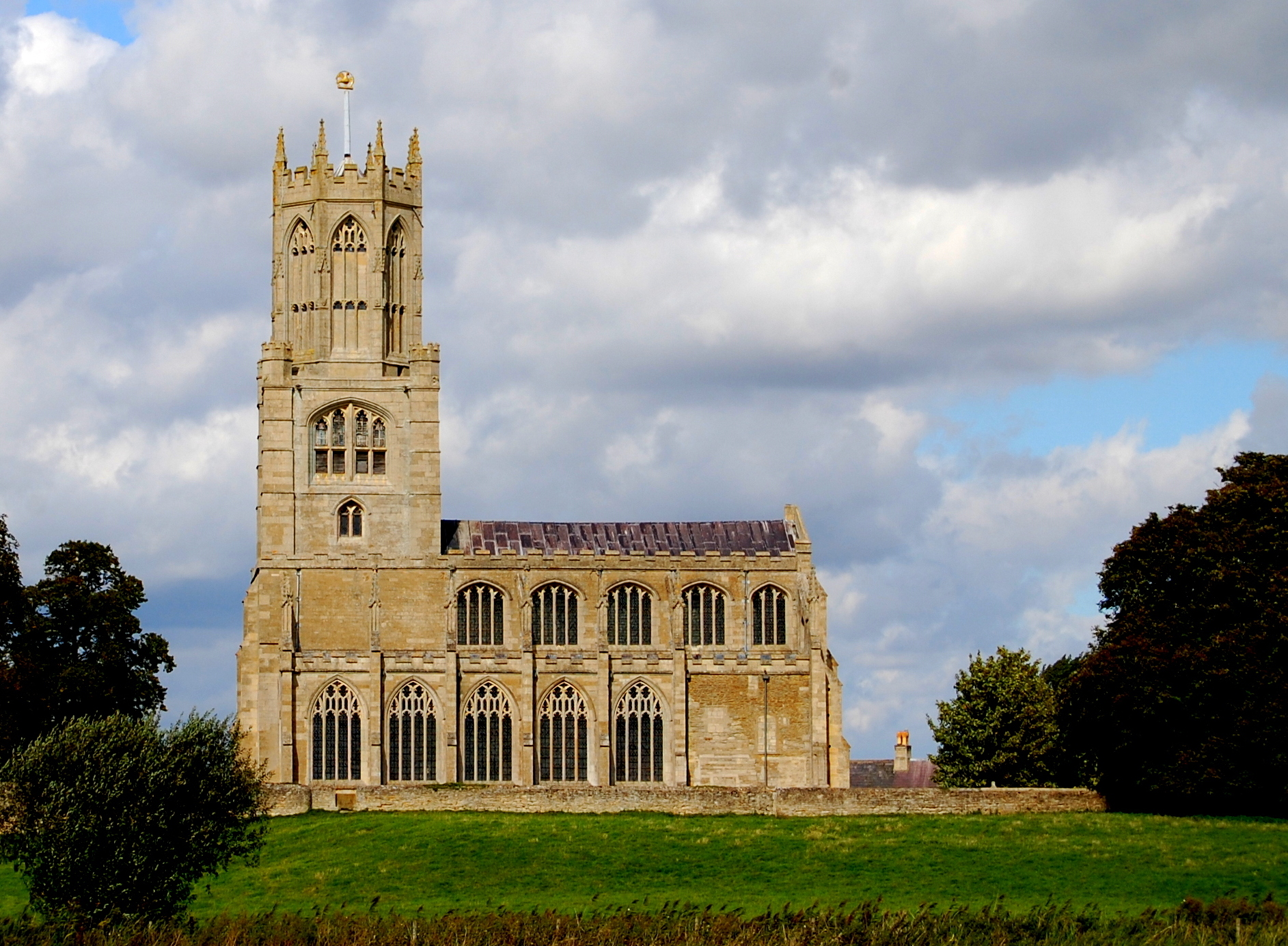
- Church of St Mary and All Saints, Fotheringhay
- Church of St Mary and All Saints, Fotheringhay
- 52.52586°N 0.43907°W
- OS grid reference: TL 05995 93143
- Country: England
- Denomination: Church of England
- Churchmanship: Broad Church

History
- Dedication: St Mary and All Saints

Architecture
- Heritage designation: Grade I listed building
- Architect: William Horwode
- Architectural type: Perpendicular Gothic
- Groundbreaking: 1411
- Completed: 1434
- Construction cost: £300 (equivalent to £294,041 in 2025)

Specifications
- Height: 116 ft (35 m)

Administration
- Province: Canterbury
- Diocese: Peterborough
- Archdeaconry: Oakham
- Deanery: Oundle
- Parish: Fotheringhay

The Church of St Mary and All Saints, Fotheringhay is a parish church in the Church of England in Fotheringhay, Northamptonshire. It is noted for containing a mausoleum to leading members of the Yorkist dynasty of the Wars of the Roses.

== Description and history ==
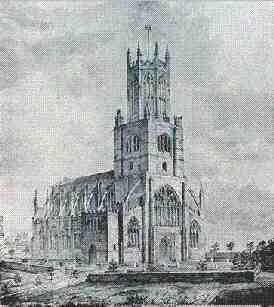
Fotheringhay Church in ca 1850, drawing by Lt John Bradshaw

The work on the present church was begun by Edward III who also built a college as a cloister on the church's southern side. After completion in around 1430, a parish church of similar style was added to the western end of the collegiate church with work beginning in 1434. A local mason, William Horwood was contracted to build the nave, porch, and tower of this church for £300 for Richard of York, 3rd Duke of York. It is the parish church which still remains.

The large present church is named in honour of St Mary and All Saints, and has a distinctive tall tower dominating the local skyline. The church is Perpendicular in style and although only the nave, aisles and octagonal tower remain of the original building it is still in the best style of its period. The tower is 78 feet (24 metres) high to the battlements, and is 116 feet (35 metres) high to the pinnacles of the octagonal lantern.

The church has been described by Simon Jenkins as

float[ing] on its hill above the River Nene, a galleon of Perpendicular on a sea of corn.

The college continued to 1547, when it was seized by the Crown, along with all remaining chantries and colleges. The chancel was pulled down immediately after the college was granted to John Dudley, 1st Duke of Northumberland, by King Edward VI. A grammar school was founded in its place which lasted until 1859.

== Clergy ==
- John Aboveton 1412–1423
- John Maston 1423–1426
- John Bokeland 1426–1434
- John Pecham 1434–1437
- Richard Wancourt 1437–1461
- Thomas Buxhall 1461–1481
- William Felde 1481–1509
- John Russel 1521–1539
- Thomas Wood 1539–1550
- John Sadler 1550–1554
- John Lowthe 1554–1556
- Sir James Woode 1556–1557
- Thomas Thurland 1557–1558
- John Welby 1558–1596
- John Johnson 1596–1643
- Jonathan Welby 1643–????
- Thomas Bennett 1696–1697
- James Holcott 1697–1700
- Samuel Whitworth 1700–1713
- John Loveling 1713–1735
- Richard Dobinson 1735–1736
- John Jenkinson 1736–1740
- John Jones 1740–1775
- George Griffiths 1775–1790
- William Tate 1790
- Robert Linton 1790–1833
- Thomas Linton 1833–1859
- Alfred Longhurst 1859–1881
- John Lloyd 1881–1890
- Richard Croyden-Burton 1890–1924
- Cyril Croyden-Burton 1924–1935
- John Francis Tumer 1935–1949
- Leslie Raymond Kingsbury 1949–1954
- Sidney Ratcliffe 1954–1956
- William John Terrance Oakley 1956–1974
- Arthur Parsons 1974–1977
- Vernon Scott 1977–1981
- Michael William Rock Covington 1981–1996
- Brian Victor Rogers 1996–

== Yorkist memorials ==
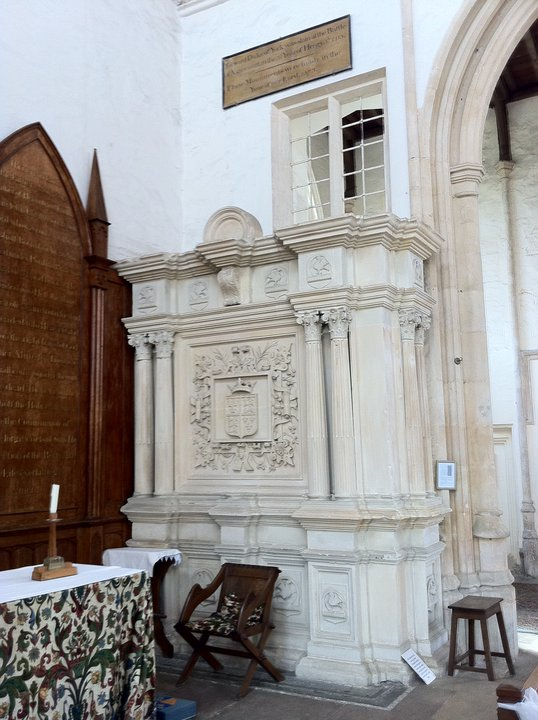
Memorial to Edward of Norwich, 2nd Duke of York, d.1415

Nearby Fotheringhay Castle was the principal home of two Dukes of York. Edward, 2nd Duke of York, who was killed at the Battle of Agincourt in 1415, was buried in the church. He had earlier established a college for a master and twelve chaplains at the location. Edward's burial provided the basis for the later adoption of the church as a mausoleum to the Yorkist dynasty. In 1476 the church witnessed one of the most elaborate ceremonies of Edward IV's reign – the re-interment of the bodies of the king's father Richard Plantagenet, 3rd Duke of York and his younger brother Edmund, Earl of Rutland, who had been buried in a humble tomb at Pontefract. Father and son fell at the Battle of Wakefield on 30 December 1460.

Thomas Whiting, Chester Herald, has left a detailed account of the events:

on 24 July [1476] the bodies were exhumed, that of the Duke, "garbed in an ermine furred mantle and cap of maintenance, covered with a cloth of gold" lay in state under a hearse blazing with candles, guarded by an angel of silver, bearing a crown of gold as a reminder that by right the Duke had been a king. On its journey, Richard, Duke of Gloucester, with other lords and officers of arms, all dressed in mourning, followed the funeral chariot, drawn by six horses, with trappings of black, charged with the arms of France and England and preceded by a knight bearing the banner of the ducal arms. Fotheringhay was reached on 29 July, where members of the college and other ecclesiastics went forth to meet the cortege. At the entrance to the churchyard, King Edward waited, together with the Duke of Clarence, the Marquis of Dorset, Earl Rivers, Lord Hastings and other noblemen. Upon its arrival the King 'made obeisance to the body right humbly and put his hand on the body and kissed it, crying all the time.' The procession moved into the church where two hearses were waiting, one in the choir for the body of the Duke and one in the Lady Chapel for that of the Earl of Rutland, and after the King had retired to his 'closet' and the princes and officers of arms had stationed themselves around the hearses, masses were sung and the King's chamberlain offered for him seven pieces of cloth of gold 'which were laid in a cross on the body.' The next day three masses were sung, the Bishop of Lincoln preached a 'very noble sermon' and offerings were made by the Duke of Gloucester and other lords, of 'The Duke of York's coat of arms, of his shield, his sword, his helmet and his coursers on which rode Lord Ferrers in full armour, holding in his hand an axe reversed.' When the funeral was over, the people were admitted into the church and it is said that before the coffins were placed in the vault which had been built under the chancel, five thousand persons came to receive the alms, while four times that number partook of the dinner, served partly in the castle and partly in the King's tents and pavilions. The menu included capons, cygnets, herons, rabbits and so many good things that the bills for it amounted to more than three hundred pounds.

In 1495 the body of Cecily Neville, Duchess of York was laid to rest beside that of her husband the Duke of York, as her will directed. She bequeathed to the College

a square canopy, crymson cloth of gold, a chasuble, and two tunicles, and three copes of blue velvet, bordered, with three albs, three mass books, three grails and seven processioners.

After the choir of the church was destroyed in the Reformation during the sixteenth century, Elizabeth I ordered the removal of the smashed York tombs and created the present monuments to the third Duke and his wife around the altar.

The birthday of Richard III is commemorated annually by the Richard III Society by the placing of white roses in the church.

== Features ==
=== Pulpit ===
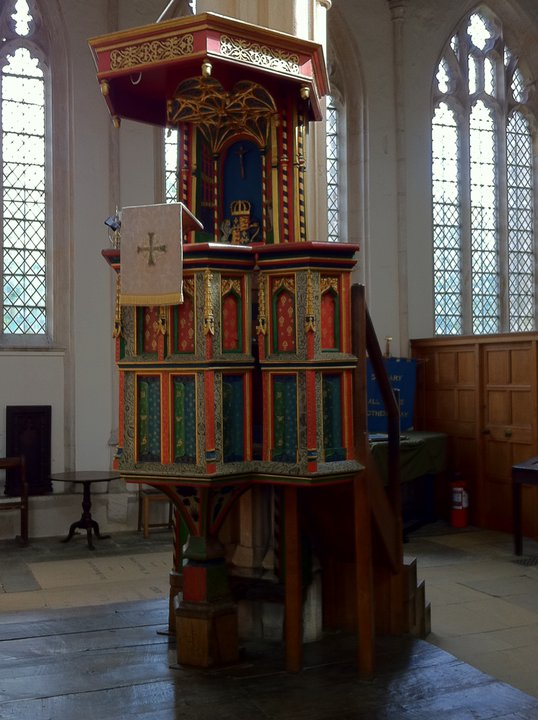
Pulpit given by Edward IV

The church contains a notable 15th-century painted pulpit donated by Edward IV carrying the royal arms, flanked by a bull for George of Clarence and a silver boar for Richard of Gloucester.

=== Organ ===
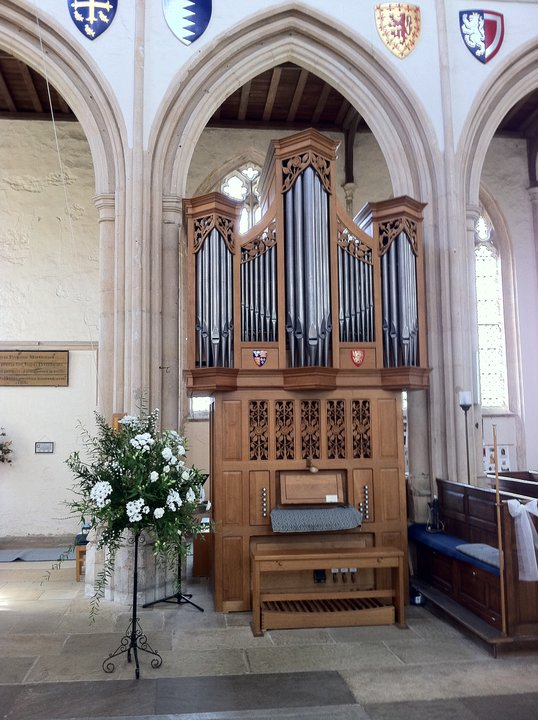
Organ by Vincent Woodstock

The current two-manual pipe organ is by Vincent Woodstock and dates from around 2000. A specification of the organ can be found on the British Institute of Organ Studies National Pipe Organ Register at D08348.

== Gallery ==
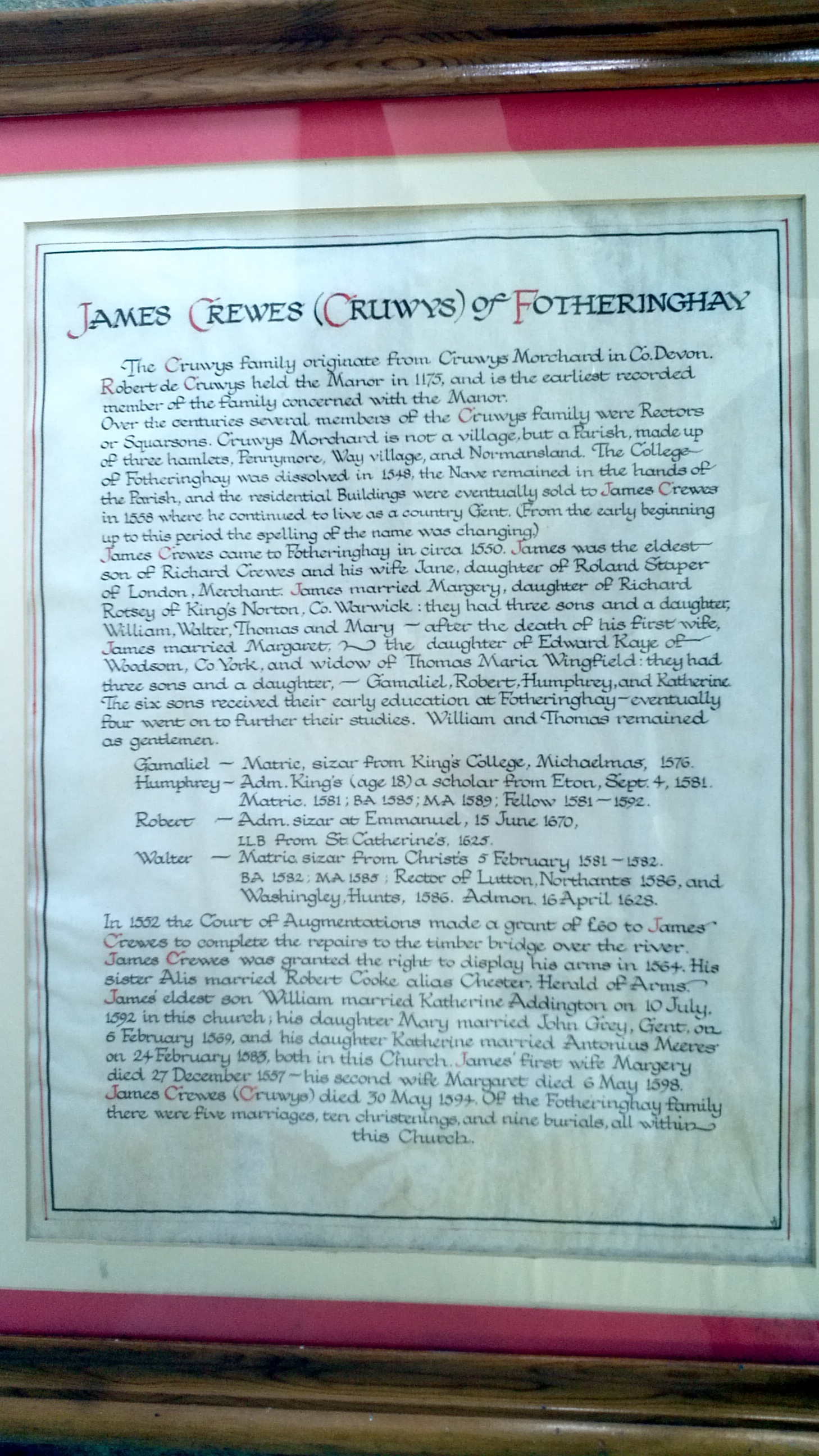
Crewes of Fotheringhay

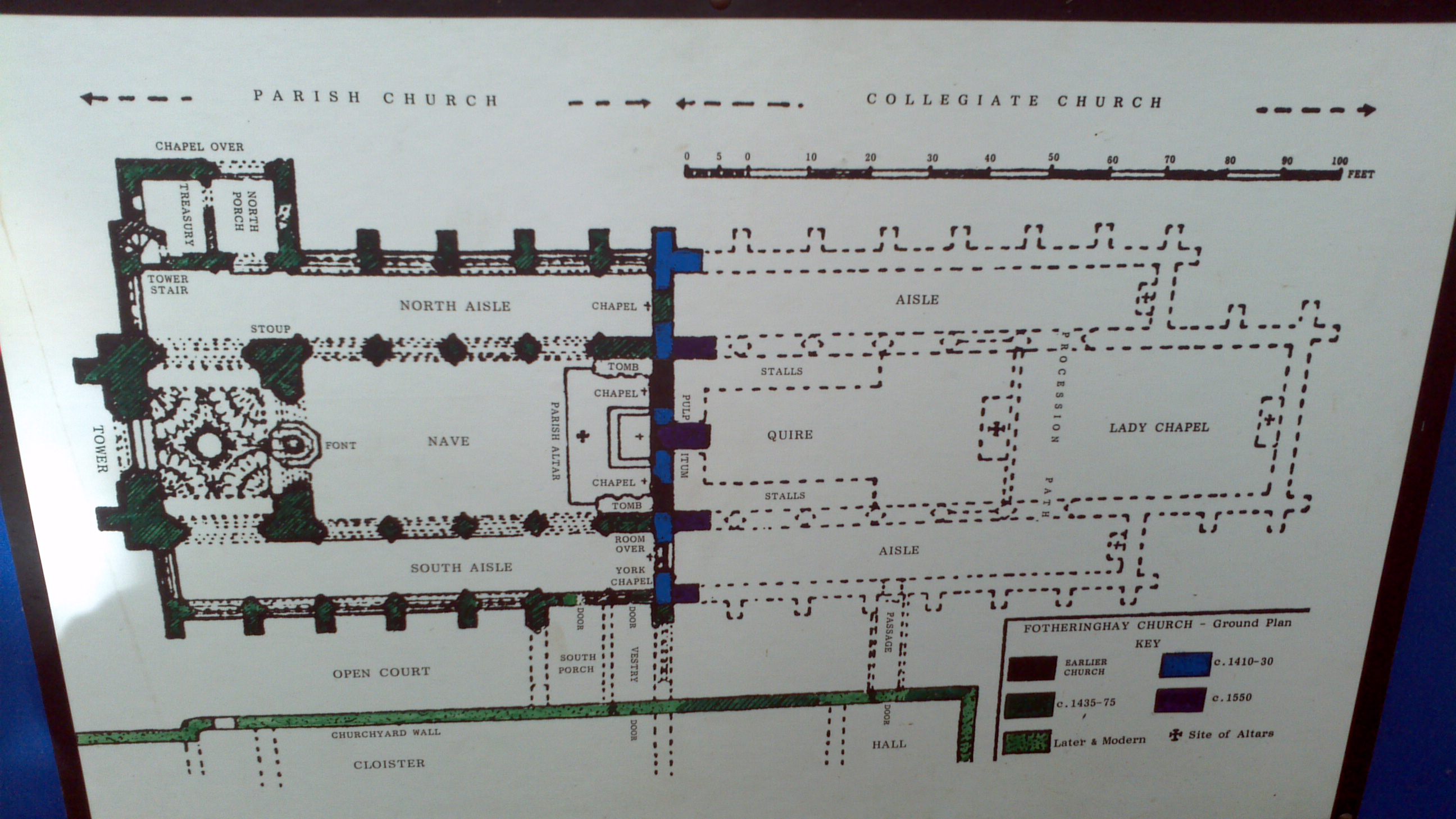
Plan showing parish and collegiate churches, and the cloister

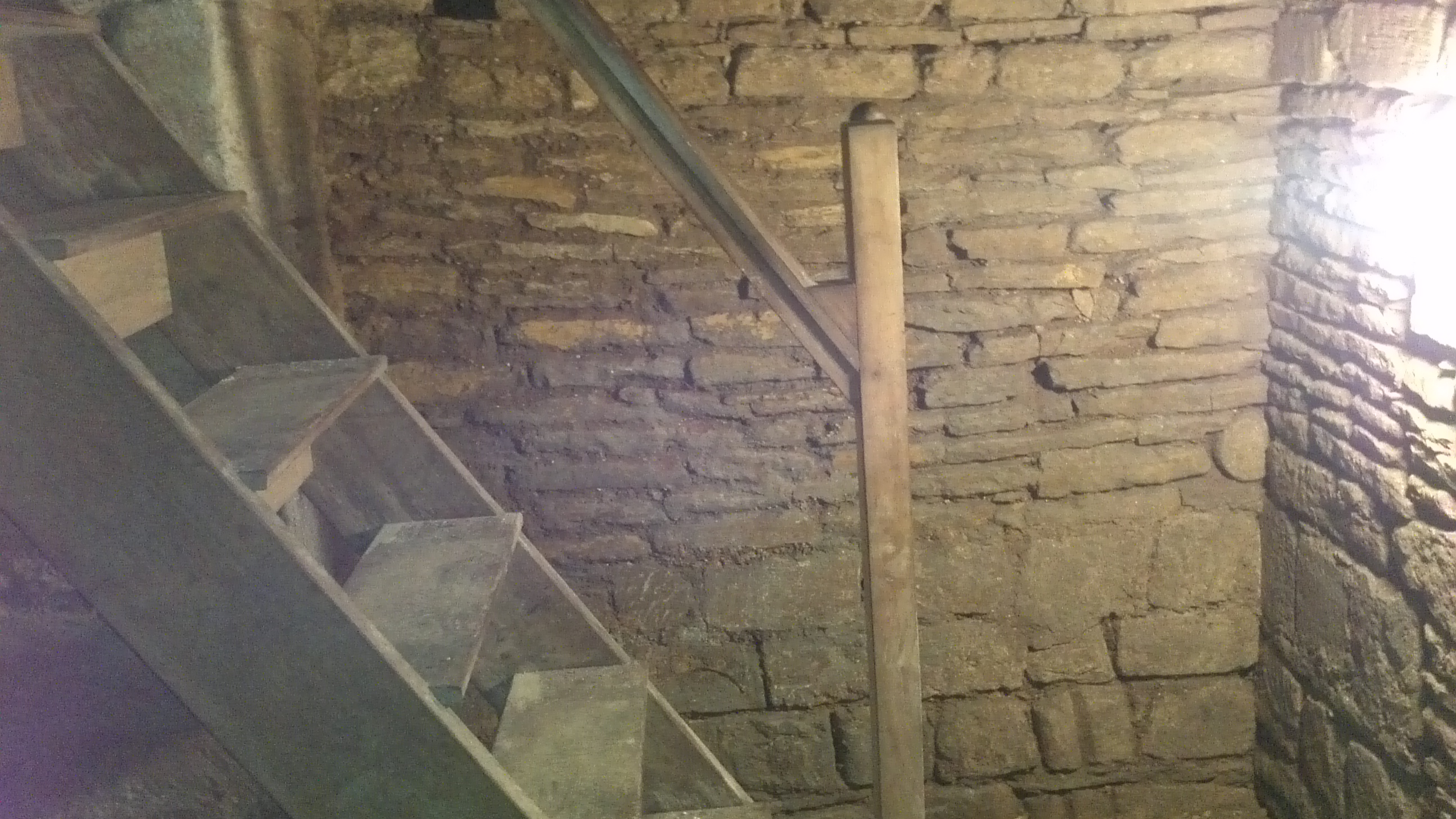
Norman foundation

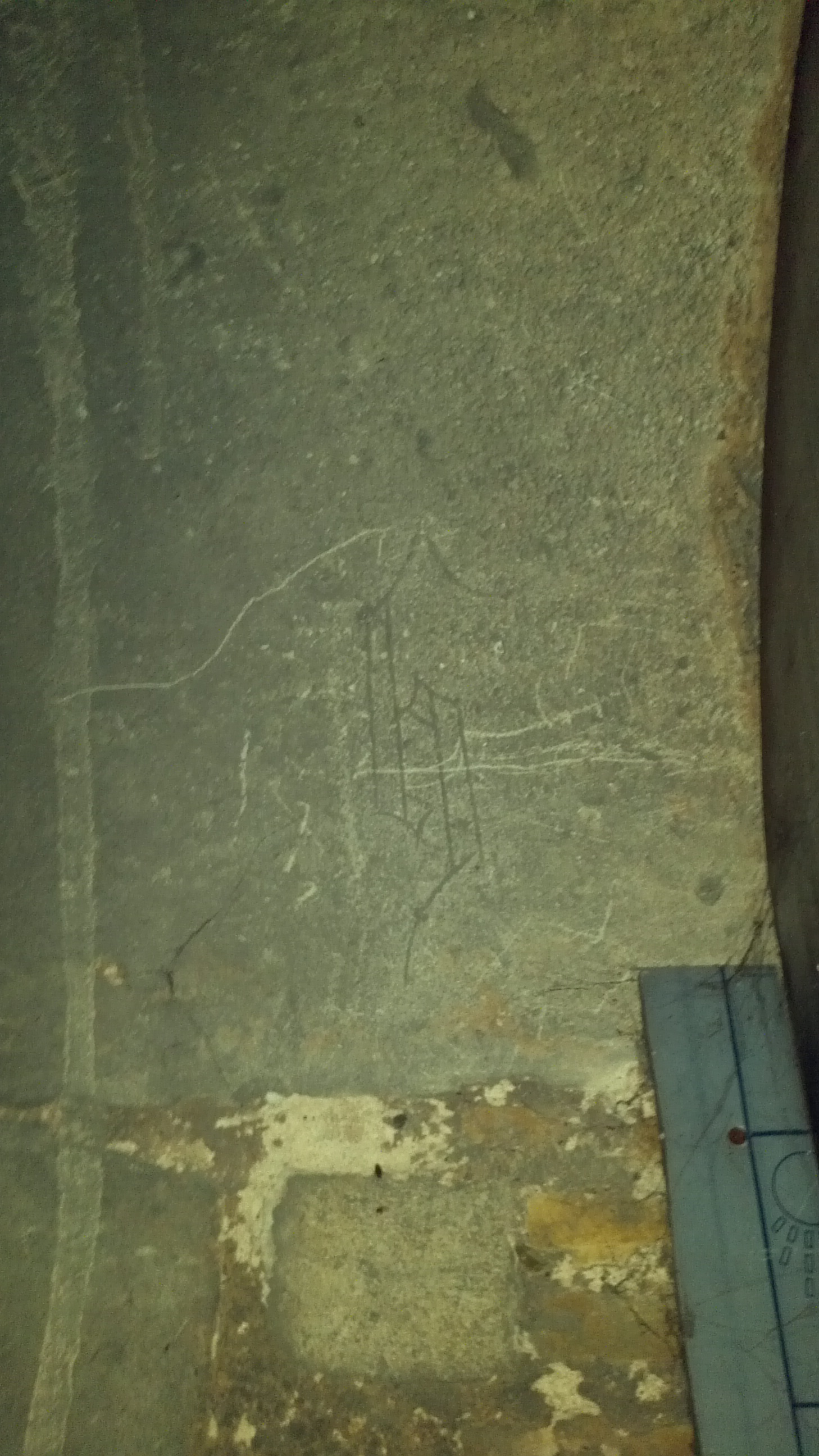
Masonic mark

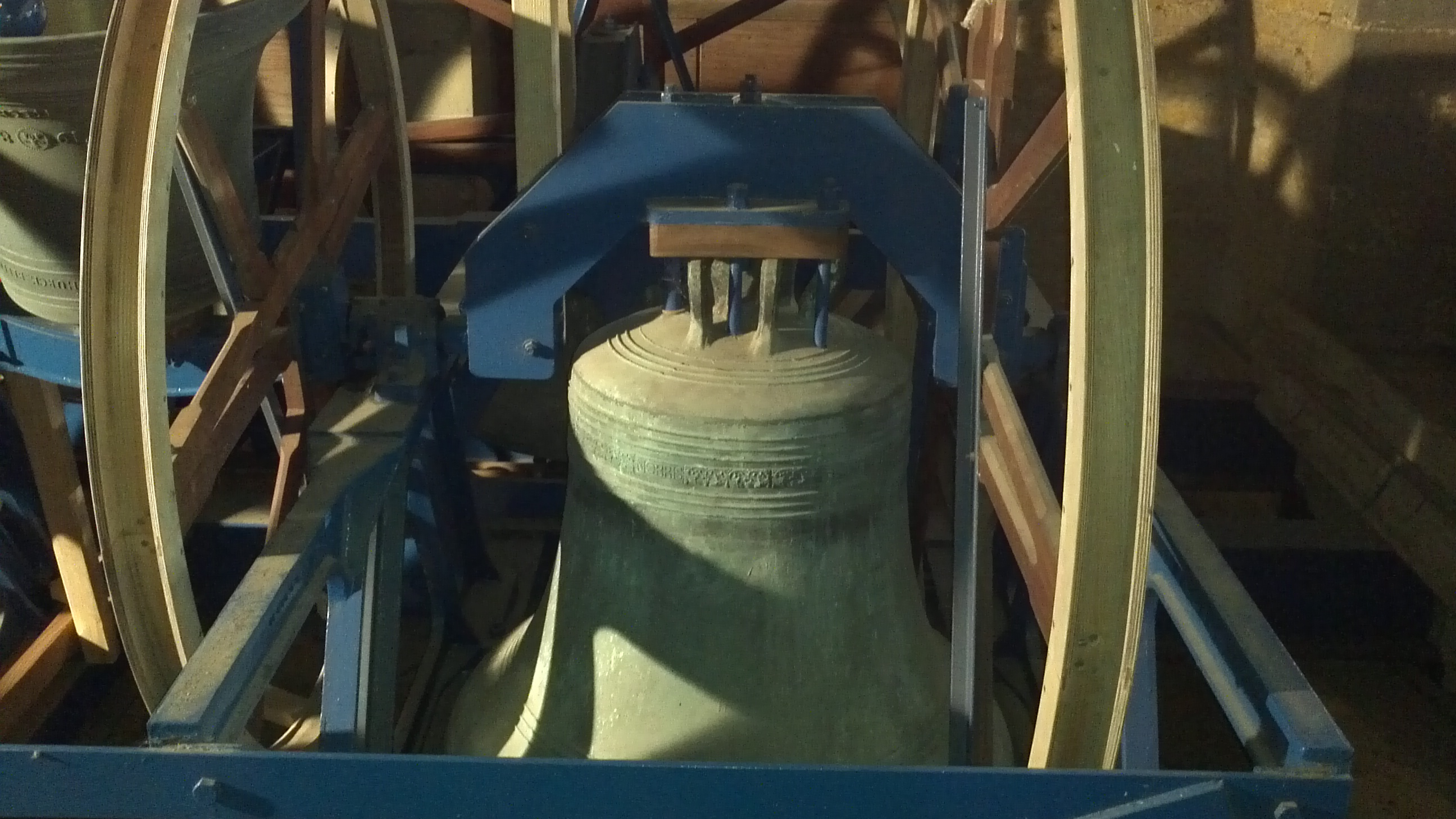
Church bell
