= St Mary & All Saints' Church, Holcot =

Church in Northamptonshire, England

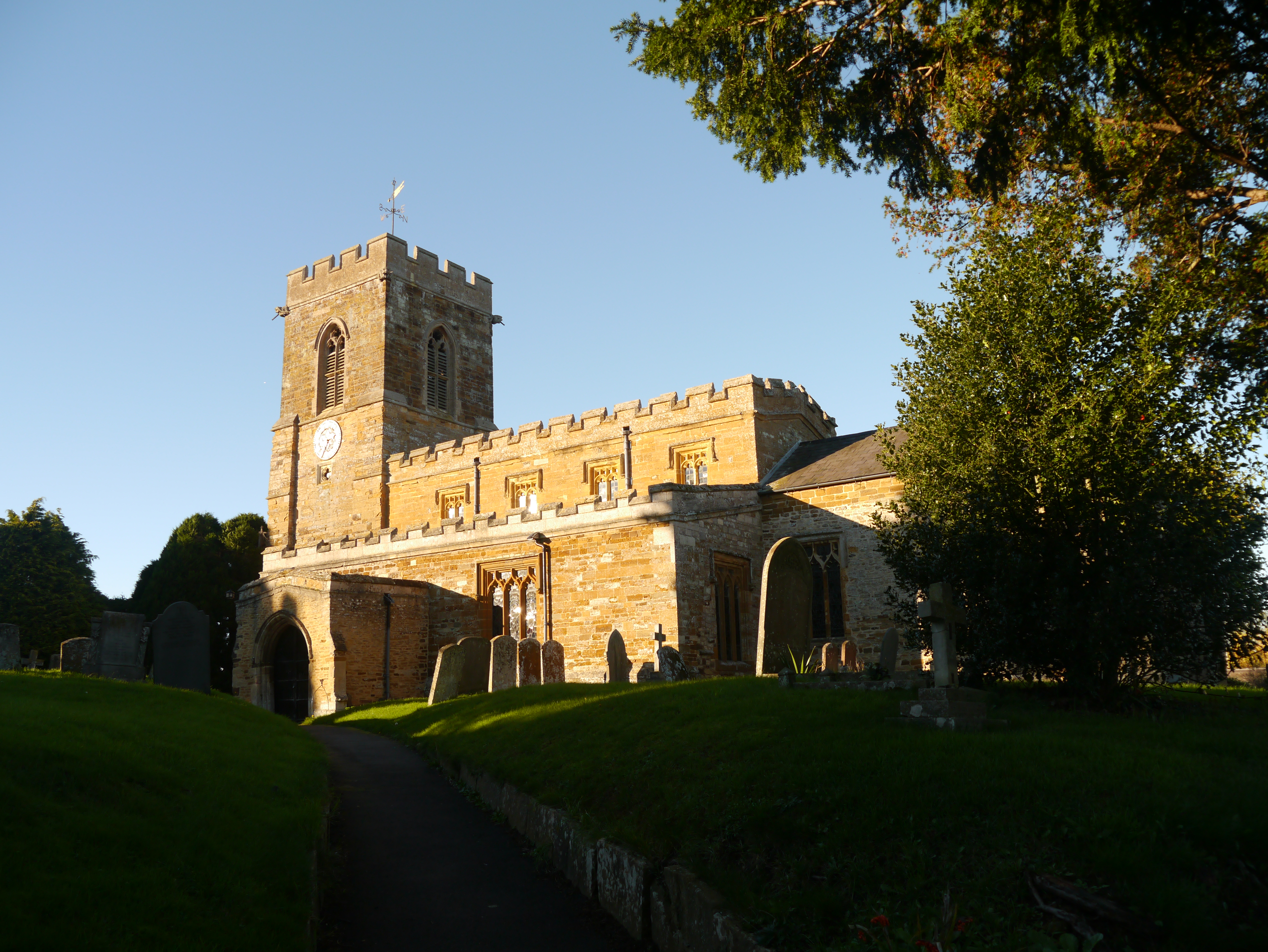
- St Mary & All Saints' Church, Holcot
- 52°19′15″N 0°50′21″W
- Denomination: Church of England
- Website: www.holcot-church.org.uk

Administration
- Province: Canterbury
- Diocese: Diocese of Peterborough
- Archdeaconry: Northampton
- Deanery: Brixworth

Clergy
- Rector: David Reith

St Mary & All Saints' Church is an Anglican Church and the parish church of Holcot. It is a Grade I listed building and stands on the west side of Main Street.

There was presumably a church at Holcot by 1086, when the Domesday Book records the presence of a priest there, although it does not mention a church building as such.

The main structure of the present building was erected in the 13th and 14th centuries. Restoration took place in 1845 and in 1889. The church now consists of a nave, north and south aisles, chancel and west tower. A detailed description also appears on the Historic England website.

The parish registers survive from 1559, the historic registers being deposited at Northamptonshire Record Office.

Holcot is part of a united Benefice along with Brixworth. Each parish retains its own church building.
