= Kelmarsh railway station =

Former railway station in Northamptonshire, England

Coordinates: 52.4188°N 0.9072°W

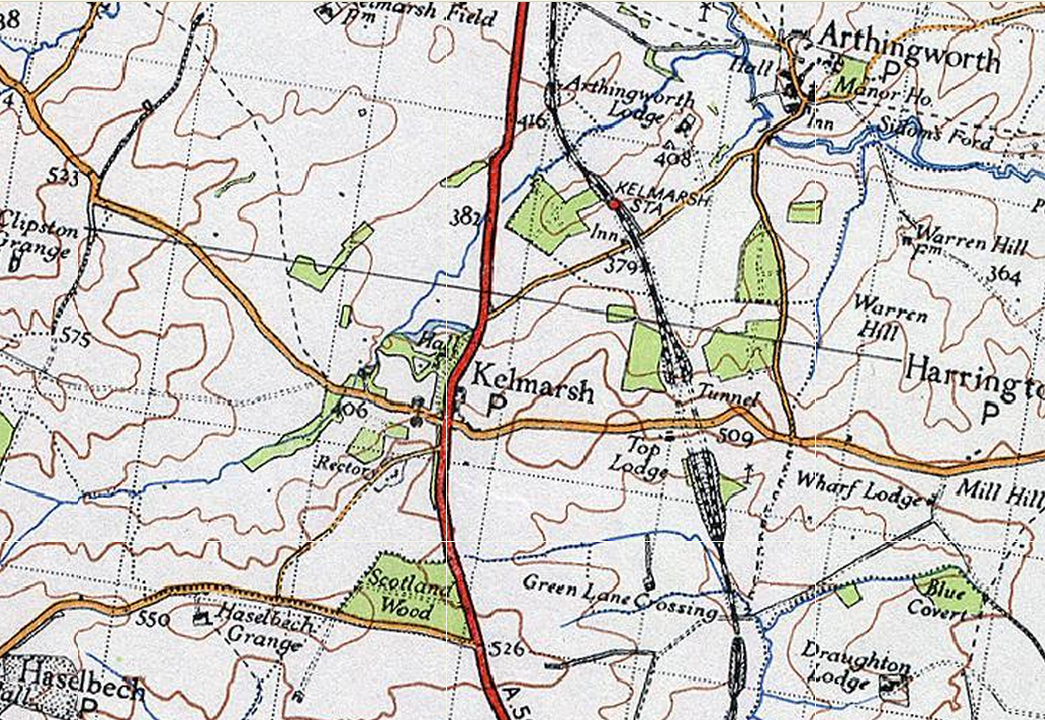
Location of Kemarsh railway station between the villages of Kelmarsh and Arthingworth which are about 2 miles (3.2 km) apart

Kelmarsh railway station on the Northampton and Market Harborough railway opened on 16 February 1859 serving the villages of Kelmarsh and Arthingworth, Northamptonshire, England. It ran almost equidistant between the two villages which are just under 2 miles (3.2 km) apart north-east of Kelmarsh and south-west of Arthingworth. It was part of the London and North Western Railway. The next station north, Clipston and Oxendon serving the villages of Great Oxendon and Clipston was situated south of Oxendon tunnel. To the south, Lamport was accessed via Kelmarsh tunnel.

The station lost its passenger service on 4 January 1960. The line was re-opened for limited periods after that and not closed completely until 15 August 1981. The Heritage Northampton & Lamport Railway hopes that it may eventually re-open the route.

Preceding station	Disused railways	Following station
Lamport	LNWR; Northampton to Market Harborough line	Clipston and Oxendon
