= All Saints' Church, Naseby =

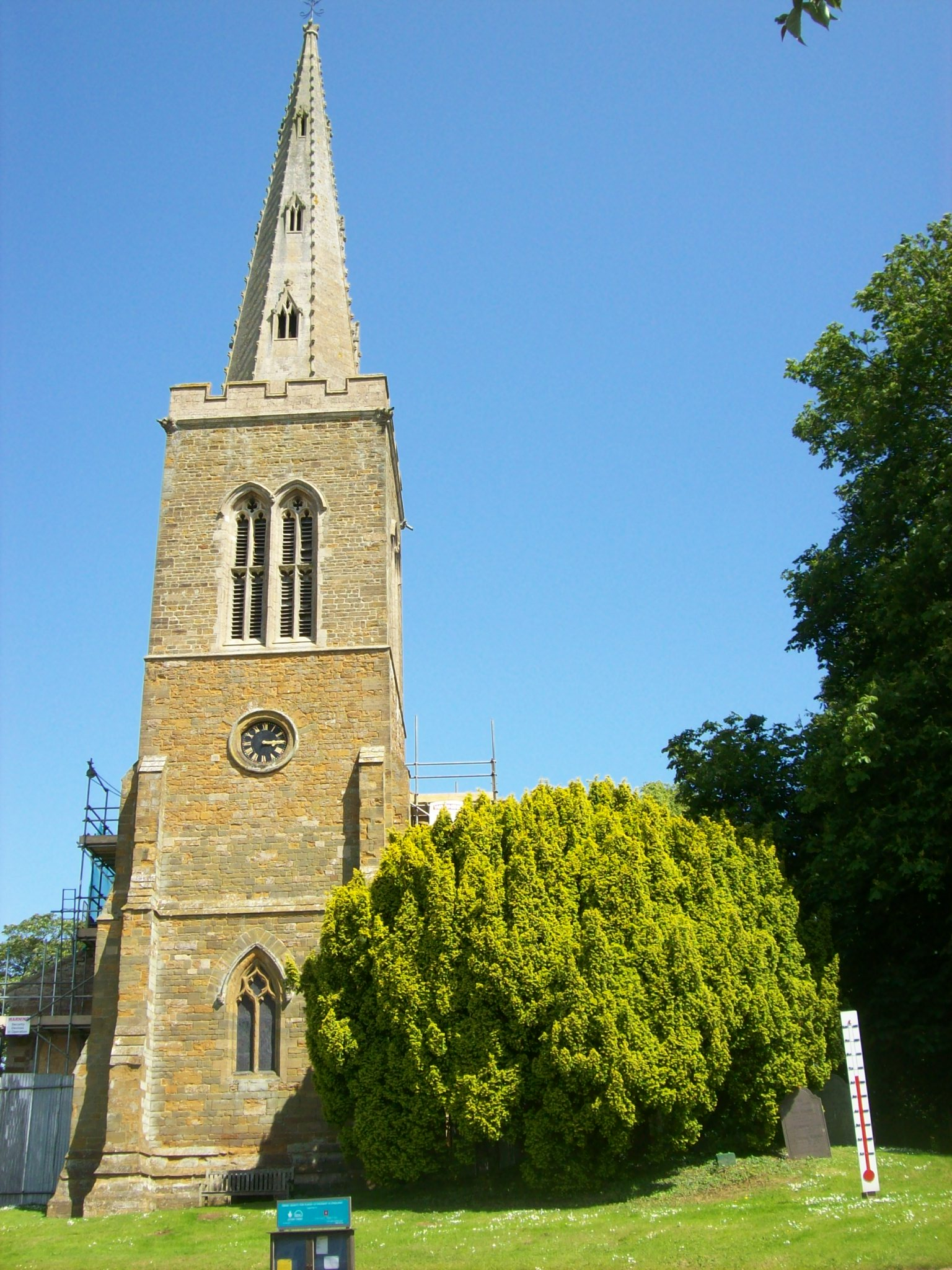
- All Saints' Church, Naseby
- 52°23′49″N 0°59′20″W
- Denomination: Church of England

Administration
- Province: Canterbury
- Diocese: Peterborough
- Archdeaconry: Northampton
- Deanery: Brixworth
- Parish: Naseby

Clergy
- Rector: Rev Angela Hughes

All Saints' Church is an Anglican Church and the parish church of Naseby in Northamptonshire, England. It is a Grade II* listed building and stands at the southern corner of Church Street and Newlands.

There was presumably a church at Naseby by 1086, when the Domesday Book records the presence of a priest there, although it does not mention a church building as such. Evidence that there was a pre-Conquest structure survives in the form of some Saxon stones that are built into the walls of the present church and an incised grave slab in the wall of the tower.

One of its oldest features still present is the font, which is very ornate and of 12th century design. Most of the current church building was erected in the 13th and 14th centuries and is largely constructed of coursed lias rubble and lias ashlar with a slate roof. The building consists of a clerestoreyed nave, north and south aisles, a chancel and west tower. The south aisle, pillars and wall were built from about 1220-1240 and the north aisle from about 1280. The clerestories above the arches on both sides of the nave date from around 1400.

At some stage, probably in the 18th century, the lower parts of the north arcade piers were encased in neo-classical plinths. The chancel was rebuilt in 1830. The tower was probably erected in the 14th century and now supports a recessed spire that was erected in 1859–60 to the designs of William Slater. The spire appears to have been left as a stump by the medieval builders but in the 18th century was provided with an unusual climax in the form of a large copper ball mounted on a king post and four supports and topped by a weather vane. According to John Mastin, a vicar and historian of Naseby, the ball was loot brought to England in 1544 by Sir Gyles Allington and ultimately found its way to Naseby.

A 17th-century table, known as "Cromwell's Table", stands in the north aisle. It is said to have come from Shuckburgh House, which is opposite the church. The story goes that on the eve of the Battle of Naseby some of the king's lifeguards were sitting down to supper at the table when they were surprised by Cromwell's troops. Several of the royal soldiers were killed, and the rest captured. Their duty done, Cromwell's men sat down at the table and finished the meal.

In 2013, BBC News reported plans to open a visitor and community centre in part of the church building, which would enable the Naseby Battlefield Trust to increase awareness of the Battle of Naseby whilst maintaining an active place of worship with up-to-date facilities.

The parish registers survive from 1563, the historic registers being deposited at Northamptonshire Record Office. In 1837 there was an exceptionally large number of baptisms recorded in the parish register.

The monumental inscriptions inside the church and in its graveyard, including its extension, have been transcribed and published. The memorials in the church include a brass commemorating John Oliyver (died 1446) and his wife, and also an oval tablet to Rev John Mastin.

Naseby is part of a united Benefice along with Clipston, Haselbech and Kelmarsh.
