= Oxendon =

Oxendon may refer to:

- Great Oxendon and Little Oxendon, villages in Northamptonshire, England
- Oxendon Rural District, a former rural district
- Oxendon Tunnels, disused railway tunnels
- Clipston and Oxendon railway station

== See also ==
- Oxenden (disambiguation)
