= Haselbech =

Village in Northamptonshire, England

Coordinates: 52.3909°N 0.9508°W

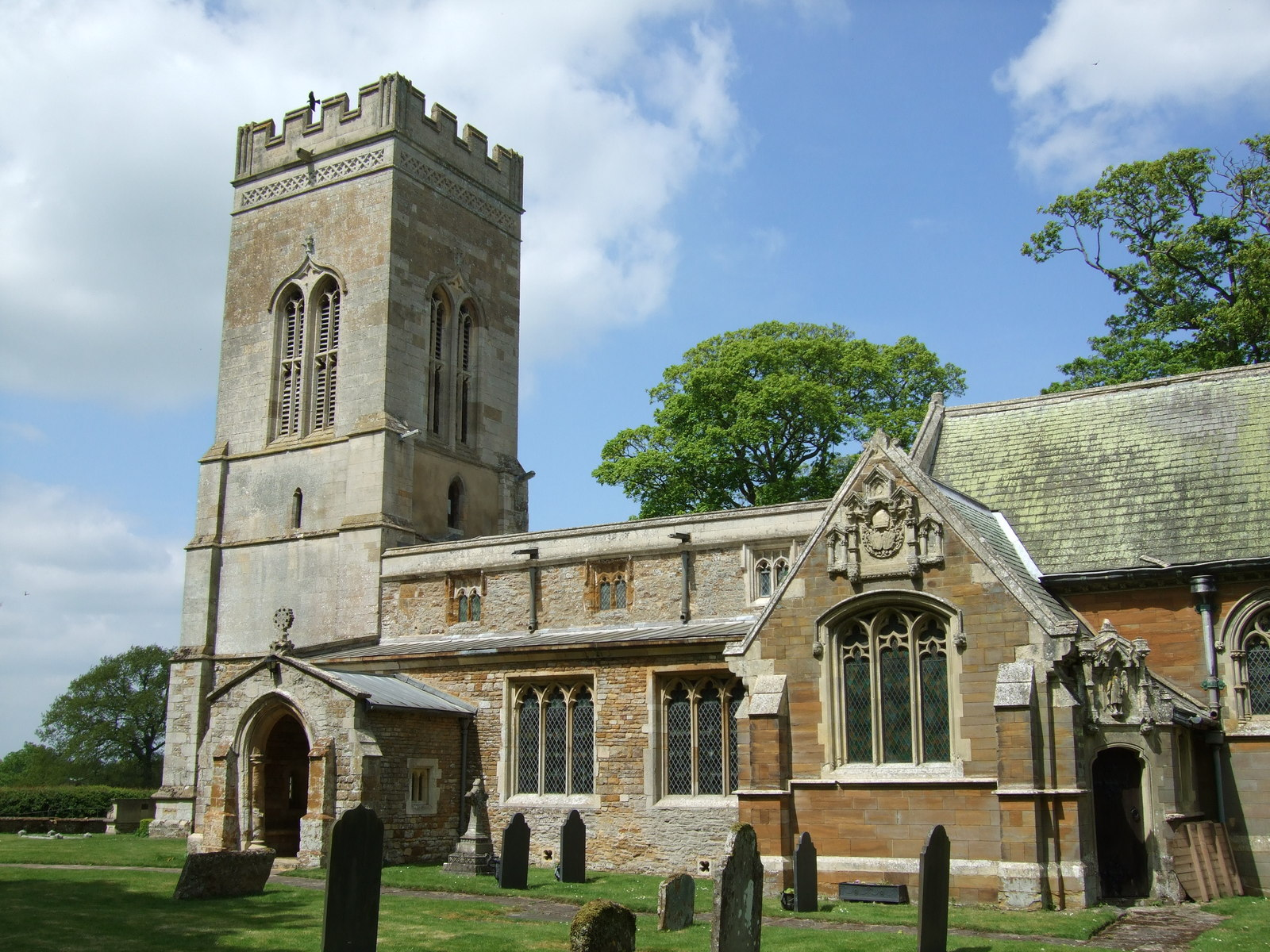
- St Michael's Church

- Location within Northamptonshire
- Population: 87 (2001)
- OS grid reference: SP7177
- Unitary authority: West Northamptonshire
- Ceremonial county: Northamptonshire
- Region: East Midlands
- Country: England
- Sovereign state: United Kingdom
- Post town: Northampton
- Postcode district: NN6
- Dialling code: 01604
- Police: Northamptonshire
- Fire: Northamptonshire
- Ambulance: East Midlands
- UK Parliament: Kettering

Haselbech (Pronounced Hazel-beech) is a village and civil parish in West Northamptonshire in England. At the time of the 2001 census, the parish had a population of 87 people. The population remained less than 100 at the 2011 Census and was included in the civil parish of Kelmarsh.

The villages name origin is uncertain. 'Hazel-tree river valley' or 'hazel-tree ridge'.

== Notable buildings ==
The Historic England website contains details of a total of eight listed buildings in the parish of Haselbech, all of which are Grade II apart from St Michael's Church, which is Grade II*. They are:

- St Michael's Church, Cottesbrooke Road
- Orton Holding, Cottesbrooke Road
- The Old Rectory, Cottesbrooke Road
- Wall attached to north west of the Old Rectory, Cottesbrooke Road
- Haselbech Hall, Kelmarsh Road
- Manor Farm, Naseby Road
- Railings south east of Manor Farmhouse, Naseby Road
- Railings south west of Manor Farmhouse, Naseby Road

In addition, an area of undeveloped land south of Naseby Road and west of Cottesbrooke Road which is the site of a medieval settlement is a scheduled monument.

=== St Michael's Church ===
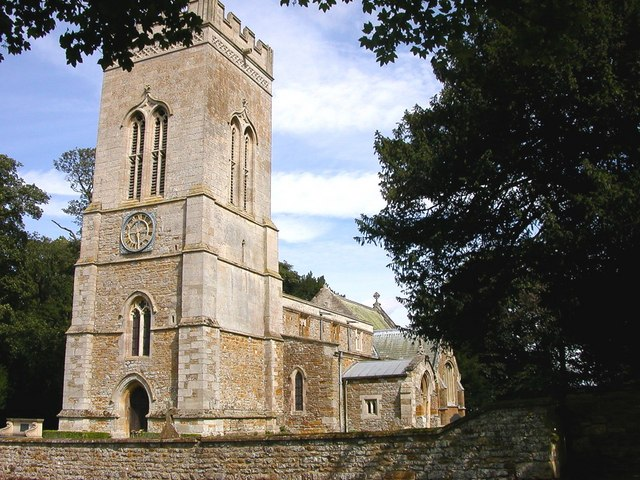
St Michael's church

This was built in the 13th and 14th centuries with coursed lias, limestone and ashlar walls and slate. The roofs are now of slate, lead and aluminium. The building includes a nave, aisles, a chancel and west tower.

The three bays of pews at the east of the nave are probably 15th century and the font probably 13th century but with a later base. There is a chancel screen and a tower screen. The pulpit is Jacobean with decorated panels and a tester.

Haselbech is part of a united Benefice along with Clipston, Kelmarsh and Naseby.

=== Haselbech Hall ===
This existing building was probably constructed by Henry Jones for Randolph Wykes and is built of limestone ashlar with stone mullioned windows and a slate roof. It is of two storeys with attic and cellar, laid out to a double depth plan. The house was gutted by fire in 1917 and remodelled after that date. The description on the Historic England website was issued in 1985 and is based on external inspection only. Historic England's description states that the building is 18th century. However, this is not consistent with the statement in "An Inventory of the Historical Monuments in the County of Northamptonshire" that "Haselbech Hall was built just before 1678 for the Wyke [sic] family". Particulars prepared for the marketing of Haselbech Hall contain detailed descriptions and illustrations of the property in 2015.
