= Lamport railway station =

Former railway station in Northamptonshire, England

Coordinates: 52.3697°N 0.8988°W

Lamport
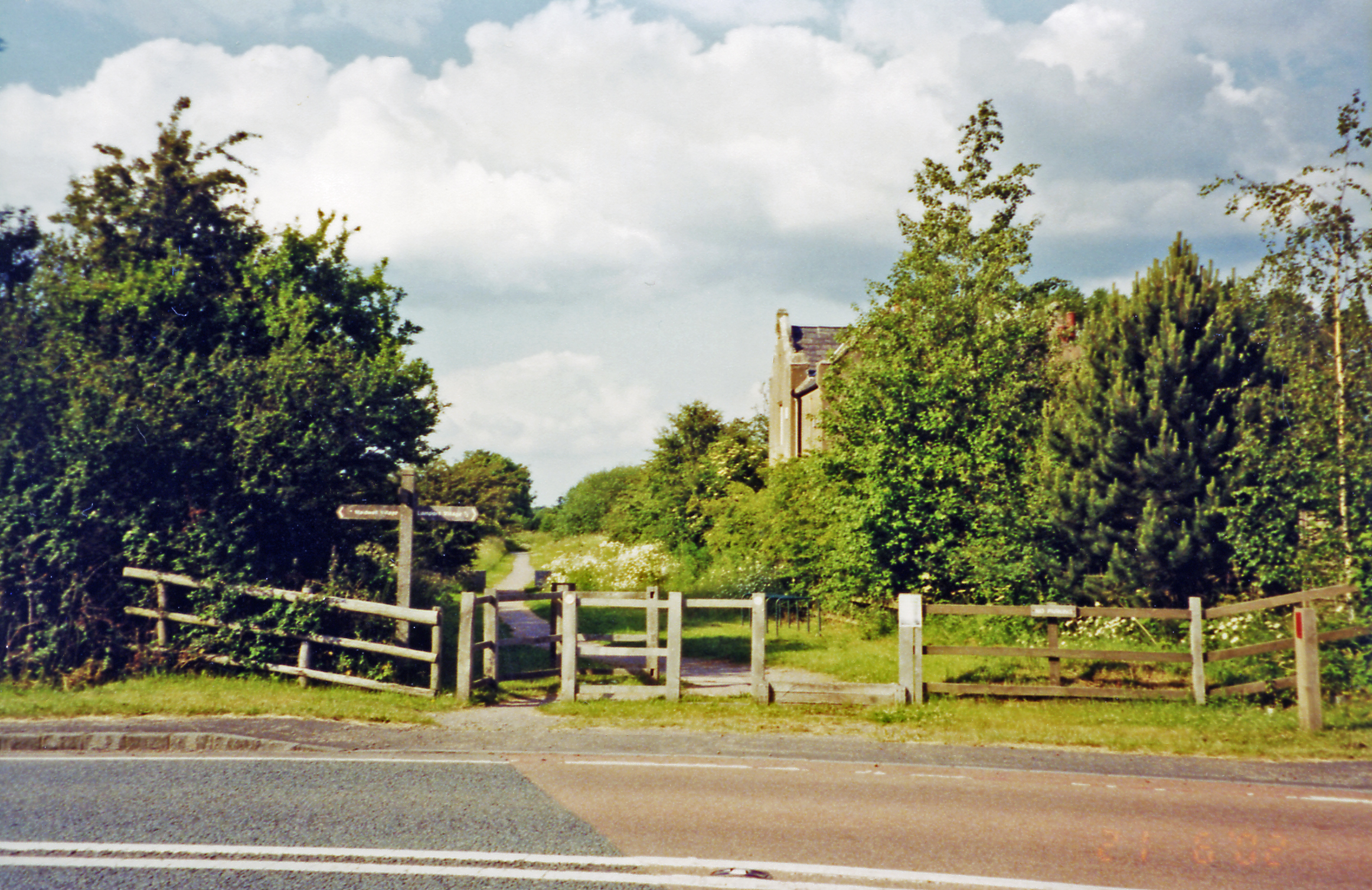
- Site of the station in 2002

General information
- Location: England

Other information
- Status: Disused

History
- Original company: London and North Western Railway

Key dates
- 16 February 1859: Opened
- 4 January 1960: Closed
Location

Lamport railway station on the Northampton and Market Harborough railway opened on 16 February 1859 serving the villages of Lamport, Maidwell, Hanging Houghton as well as Lamport Hall, Northamptonshire, England. It ran half a mile (ca.800 m) west of the village towards Maidwell just north of the road which was crossed by a level crossing. It was part of the London and North Western Railway. The next station north, Kelmarsh is located just north of Kelmarsh Tunnel.

The station lost its passenger service on 4 January 1960. The line was re-opened for limited periods after that and not closed completely until 15 August 1981. The heritage Northampton & Lamport Railway hopes that it may eventually re-open the route. The Lamport station building and some railway workers cottages still exist.

Preceding station	Disused railways	Following station
Brixworth	LNWR; Northampton to Market Harborough line	Kelmarsh
