= Brixworth railway station =

Former railway station in Northamptonshire, England

Coordinates: 52.3398°N 0.9190°W

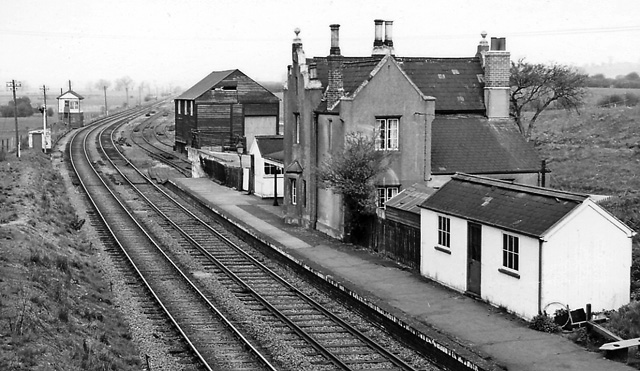
Brixworth station looking north towards Market Harborough

Brixworth railway station on the Northampton and Market Harborough railway opened on 16 February 1859 serving the village of Brixworth, Northamptonshire, England. It ran half a mile (c. 800 m) west of the village towards the village of Creaton along what remains as Station Road. It was part of the London and North Western Railway. Apart from the passenger service the line also enabled a large ironstone field near the village to be developed which had been an important consideration in developing the line.

The station lost its passenger service on 4 January 1960 and goods service on 1 June 1964. The line was re-opened for limited periods after that and not closed completely until 15 August 1981. Subsequently, the Heritage Northampton & Lamport Railway has been able to lease the trackbed and is restoring part of the route.

Preceding station	Disused railways	Following station
Spratton	LNWR; Northampton to Market Harborough line	Lamport
