= Boughton railway station =

Railway station in Northamptonshire, UK

Coordinates: 52.28127°N 0.92125°W

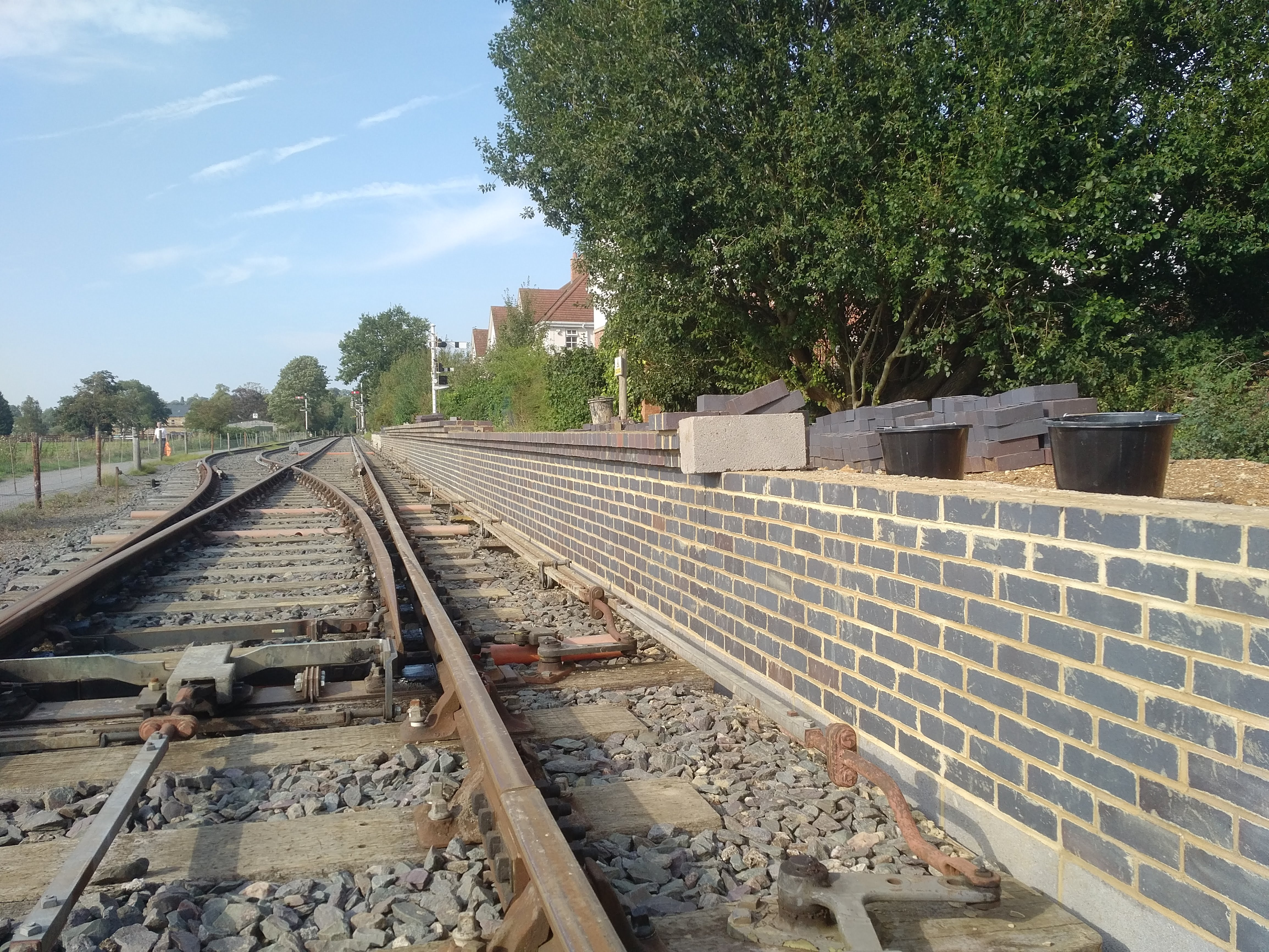
Station platform under construction in August 2019

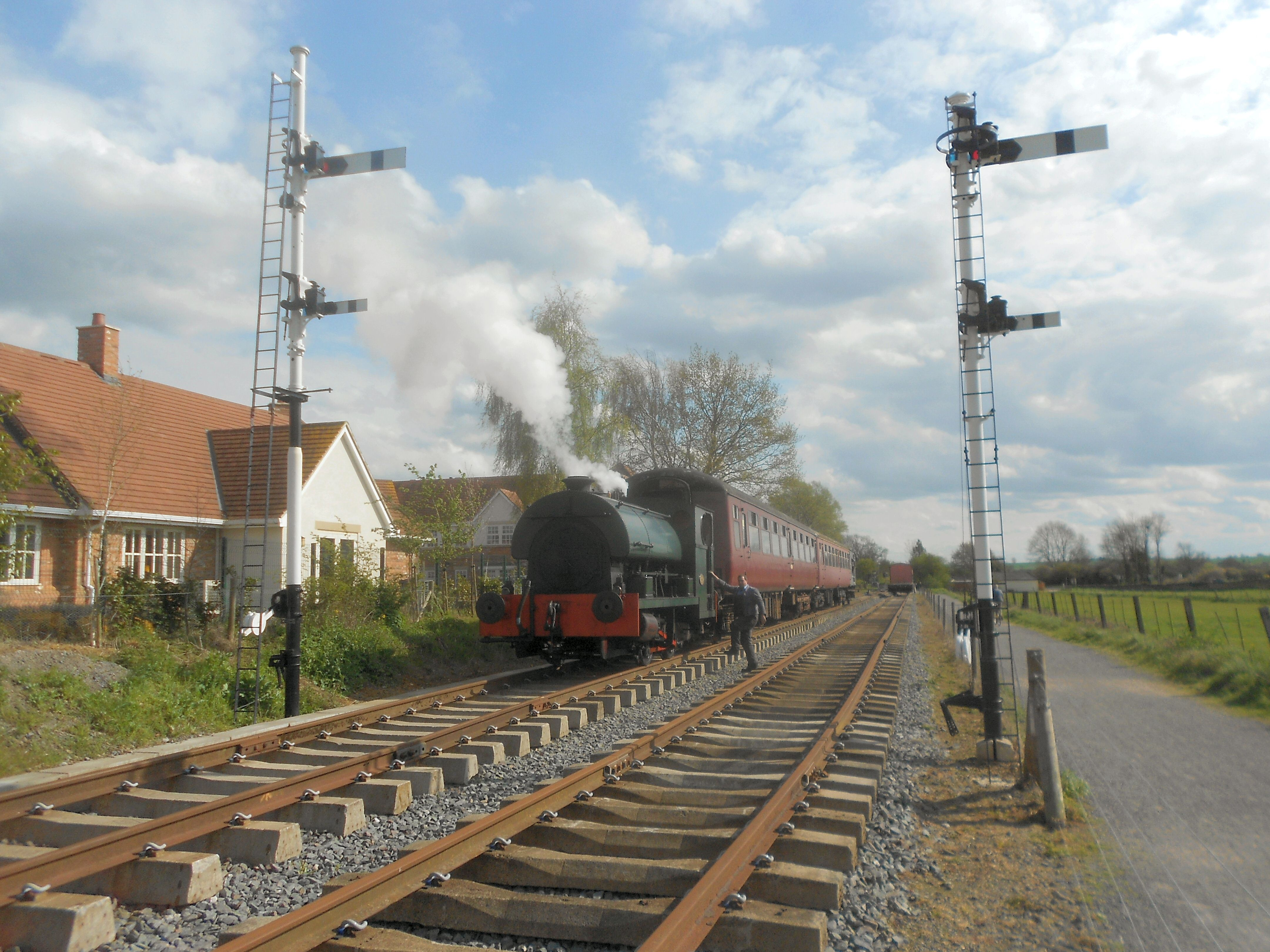
Peckett steam locomotive at the site of Boughton station in May 2012

Boughton railway station is the current terminus of the Northampton & Lamport Railway, which is built on the former Northampton to Market Harborough line. It is situated at the southern end of line adjacent to the former Boughton level crossing on the A5199. It is likely that Boughton will be the terminus of the railway for some time as the former level crossing is now occupied by a roundabout. It opened to passengers on Saturday 30 March 2024 after extensive construction work to create the platform and restoration of the signal box.

The station consists of a main platform and adjacent run-round loop, with associated signalling controlled from a new signal box which was formerly installed at Betley Road near Crewe. There is also a bay platform, accessed via a headshunt, where a carriage can be stabled for use as a buffet and ticket office. Adjacent to the station site is The Windhover pub. The "Brampton View" care village for the elderly opened in 2008.

Boughton Crossing is also the southern end of the Brampton Valley Way, part of which has been diverted to make room for the passing loop at the station.

| Preceding station | Heritage railways | Following station |
|---|---|---|
| Pitsford and Brampton | Northampton & Lamport Railway | Terminus |
