= Clipston and Oxendon railway station =

Former railway station in Northamptonshire, England

Coordinates: 52.4347°N 0.9156°W

Clipston & Oxendon
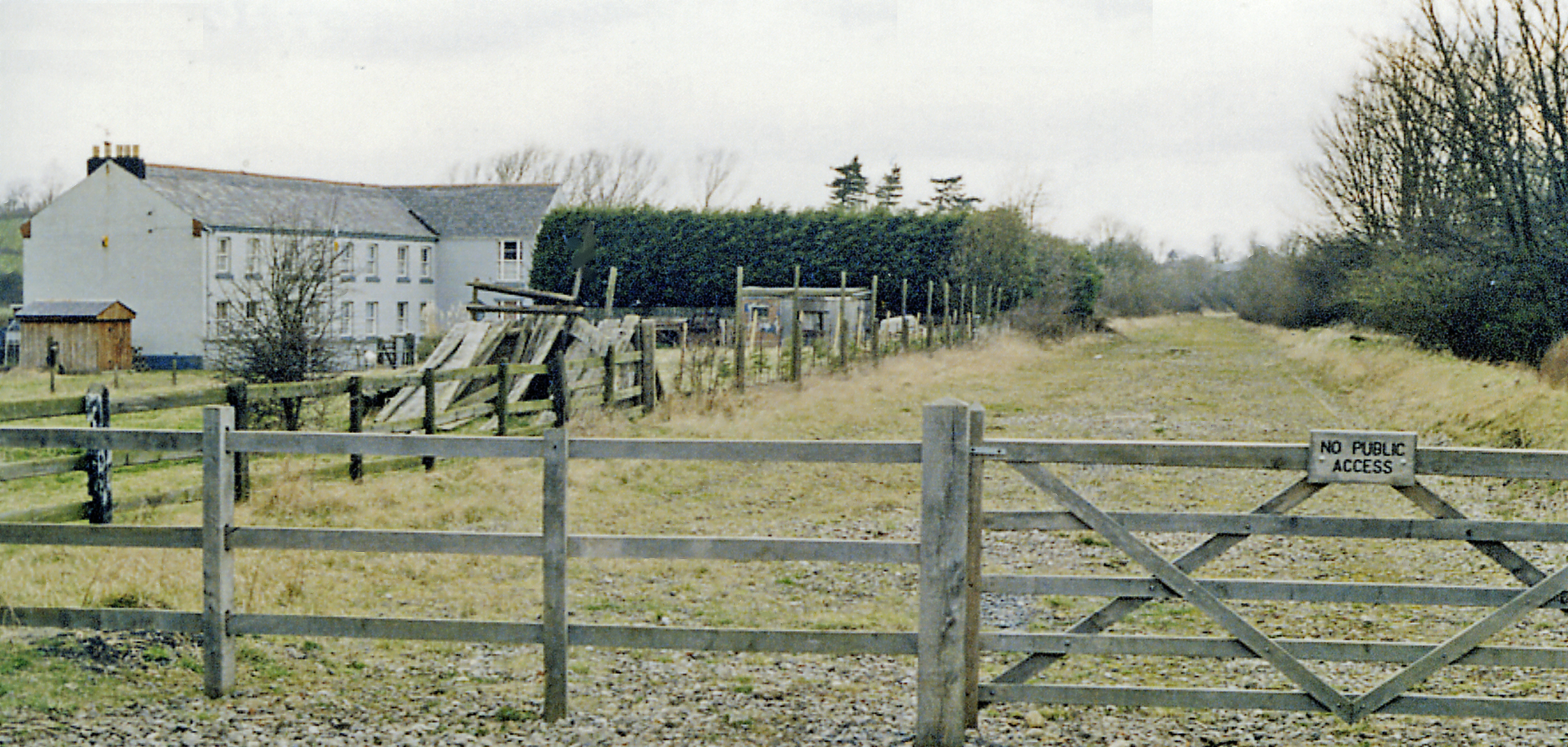
- Station location (1989)

General information
- Location: England
- Platforms: 2

Other information
- Status: Disused

History
- Original company: London and North Western Railway
- Pre-grouping: London and North Western Railway
- Post-grouping: London, Midland and Scottish Railway

Key dates
- 1 June 1863: Opened as Clipstone & Oxendon
- November 1879: Renamed Clipston & Oxendon
- 4 January 1960: Closed
Location

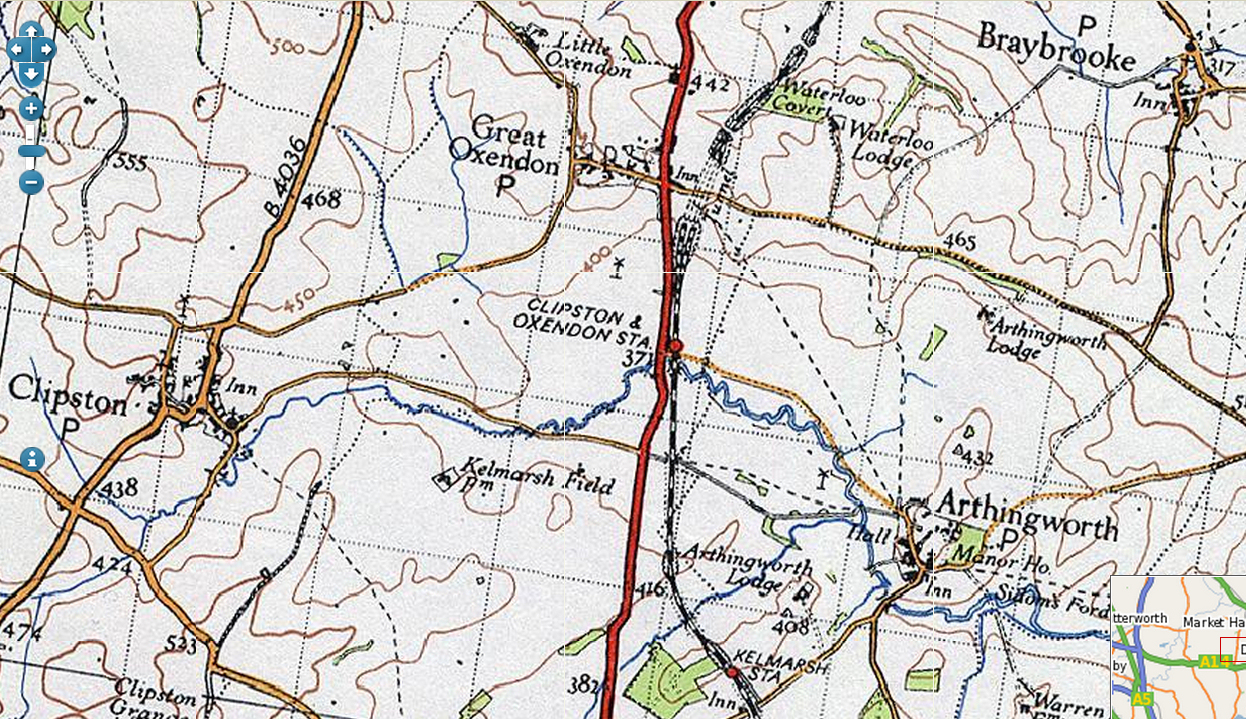
Location of Clipston and Oxendon station on 1948 Ordnance Survey map showing location of the station south of Oxendon tunnel

Clipston and Oxendon railway station on the Northampton and Market Harborough railway opened in 1863 as a result of villagers' requests serving the villages of Clipston and Great Oxendon, Northamptonshire, England. It was about 1 mile south-east of the Oxendon and about 3 miles walking distance north-east of Clipston. It was south of Oxendon tunnel. It was part of the London and North Western Railway.

The station lost its passenger service on 4 January 1960. The line was re-opened for limited periods after that and not closed completely until 15 August 1981. The Heritage Northampton & Lamport Railway hopes that it may eventually re-open the route.

Preceding station	Disused railways	Following station
Kelmarsh	LNWR; Northampton to Market Harborough line	Market Harborough
