= Spratton railway station =

Former railway station in Northamptonshire, England

Coordinates: 52.3295°N 0.9201°W

Spratton railway station is a former railway station which served the village of Spratton in Northamptonshire, England.

The station was once an intermediate stop on the Northampton–Market Harborough line, which closed in 1981. A section of the route at Pitsford and Brampton station has now been revived as the headquarters of a heritage railway called the Northampton & Lamport Railway.

The preservation society which operates the line has a light railway order up to and including Spratton, and it is likely a station will be rebuilt there in the future. The original signal box has been preserved and is stored awaiting re-use.

== History ==
The branch line from Northampton to Market Harborough was opened by the London and North Western Railway on 16 February 1859. Spratton station opened in 1864 adjacent to the level crossing where the line crossed the Spratton to Brixworth road, with four trains each way stopping daily.

Spratton station closed on 23 May 1949, and the line itself closed on 16 August 1981.

Preceding station	Disused railways	Following station
Brixworth	LNWR; Northampton to Market Harborough line	Pitsford and Brampton
