= Great Oxendon =

Village in Northamptonshire, England

Coordinates: 52.443°N 0.922°W

- Location within Northamptonshire
- Population: 331 (2011)
- OS grid reference: SP7383
- Unitary authority: West Northamptonshire
- Ceremonial county: Northamptonshire
- Region: East Midlands
- Country: England
- Sovereign state: United Kingdom
- Post town: Market Harborough
- Postcode district: LE16
- Dialling code: 01858
- Police: Northamptonshire
- Fire: Northamptonshire
- Ambulance: East Midlands
- UK Parliament: Kettering

Great Oxendon is a linear village and civil parish in West Northamptonshire in England. At the time of the 2001 census, the parish's population was 307 people, increasing to 331 at the 2011 Census.

The villages name means 'oxen hill'.

Its eastern end is on the A508 road from Market Harborough to Northampton but most of the village is at 90° to the main road's north–south direction. The former railway tunnel at Great Oxendon is now open as part of the Brampton Valley Way.

Between 1859 and 1960 the village was served by Clipston and Oxendon railway station about one mile south-east of the village and with running trains between Northampton in the south and Market Harborough in the north.

Little Oxendon is a deserted medieval village about one mile north of Great Oxendon at grid reference SP730846.

== Notable buildings ==
The Historic England website contains details of a total of four listed buildings in the parish of Great Oxendon, all of which are Grade II apart from St Helen's Church, which is Grade II*. They are:

- St Helen's Church, Harborough Road
- 29 & 31 Main Street
- 45 Main Street and attached barn
- Plum Tree Cottage, Main Street

== See also ==
- Oxendon Rural District
