= St Helen's Church, Oxendon =

Church in Northamptonshire, England

Coordinates: 52°26′54″N 0°55′09″W

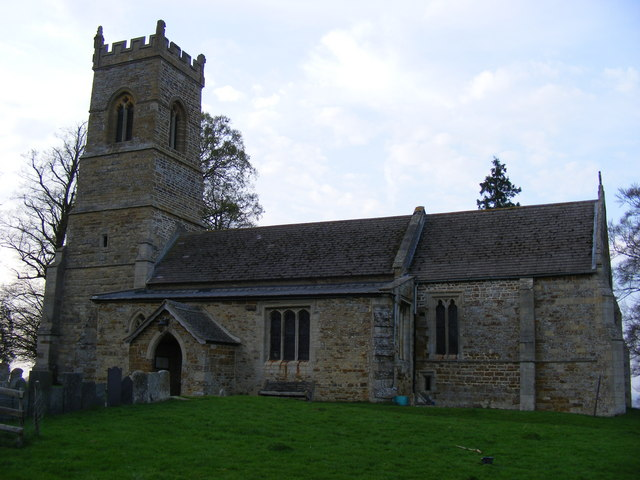
- St Helen's Church, Oxendon
- Denomination: Church of England
- Website: http://www.faxtongroup.org.uk/sthelenschurchgr.htm

Administration
- Province: Canterbury
- Diocese: Diocese of Peterborough
- Archdeaconry: Northampton
- Deanery: Brixworth

Clergy
- Rector: Rev Canon Mary Garbutt

St Helen's Church is an Anglican Church and the parish church of Oxendon. It is a Grade II* listed building and stands on the west side of Harborough Road, to the north of the village of Great Oxendon.

There is no reference to a church or priest in the entry for the parish in the Domesday Book, which was compiled in 1086. This may indicate the absence of a church building at that stage or, alternatively, only the absence of a resident priest.

The main structure of the present building was erected in the 13th and 14th centuries. Restoration was carried out in the 19th century. The church consists of a nave, north and south aisles, chancel and west tower. A detailed description appears on the Historic England website.

The parish registers survive from 1564 and, apart from those currently in use, are kept at Northamptonshire Record Office. Details of its location and opening times can be found on the Record Office website.

Oxendon is part of a united Benefice along with Arthingworth, East Farndon and Harrington. Each parish retains its own church building.
