= Oxenden =

Oxenden is a surname. Notable people with the surname include:

- Ashton Oxenden
- Charles Oxenden, English cricketer
- George Oxenden (disambiguation)
- Sir Henry Oxenden, 3rd Baronet
- Sir James Oxenden, 2nd Baronet, English MP
- William Oxenden, English MP
- Oxenden Baronets

== See also ==
- Oxendon (disambiguation)
