= Cromwell Cottage, Naseby =

Cottage in Naseby, Northamptonshire, England

Coordinates: 52.3955°N 0.9885°W

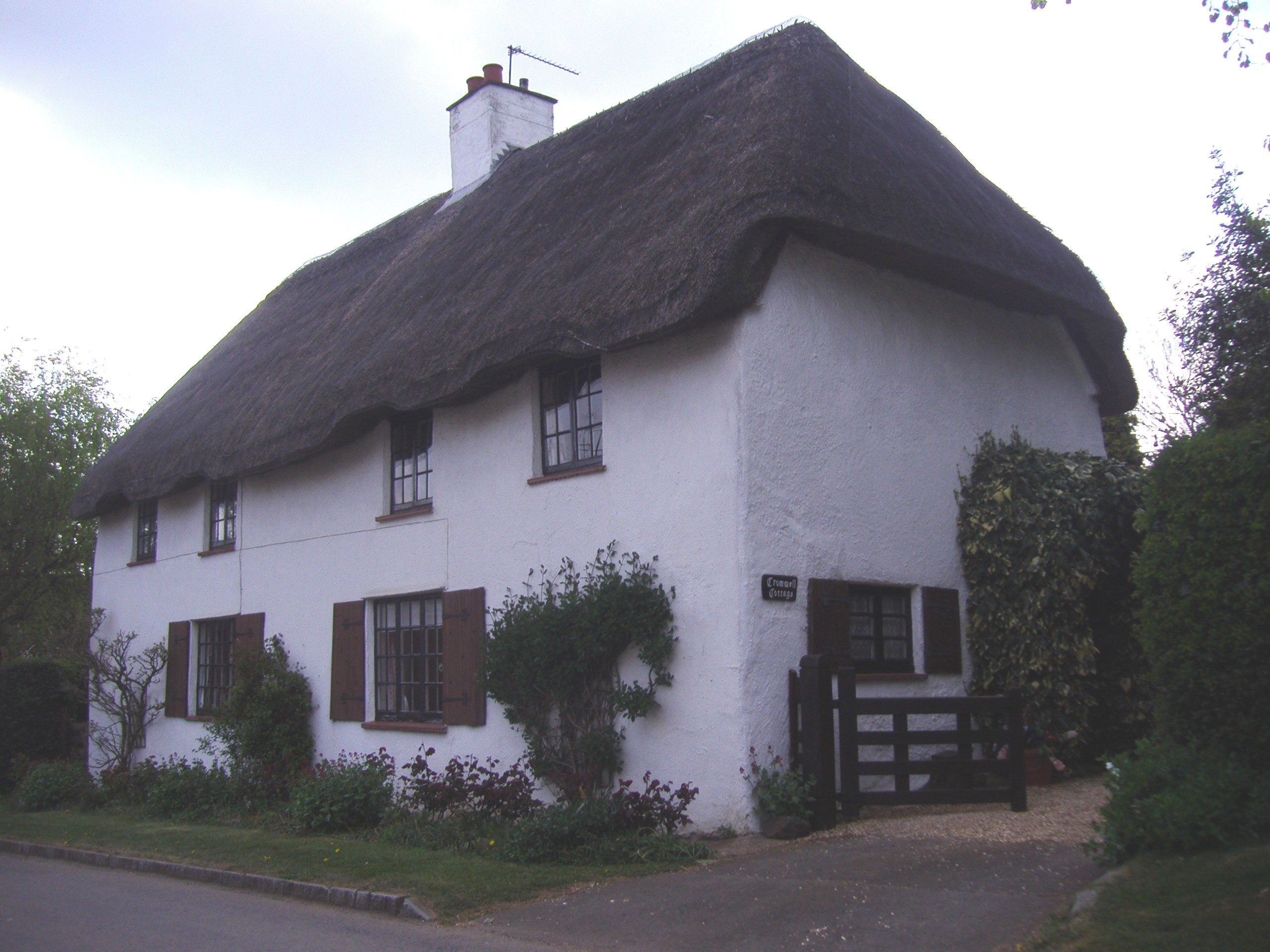

Cromwell Cottage is a Grade II listed building that stands on a site on the west side of the High Street, just north of its junction with School Lane, in Naseby, Northamptonshire, England.

== Building ==
A detailed description of the building appears in the relevant entry on the English Heritage website and appears to be based on an external inspection of the structure in 1985 or earlier. The entry states that the building is probably mid-18th century. It is constructed of rendered cob with a thatch roof.

== History ==
The building stands in the same position as a dwelling shown on an estate plan of 1630 as being that of Thomas Chester. The plan is held by Suffolk Record Office as part of the Fitzgerald papers.
