= Pitsford and Brampton railway station =

Railway station in Northamptonshire, England

Pitsford and Brampton
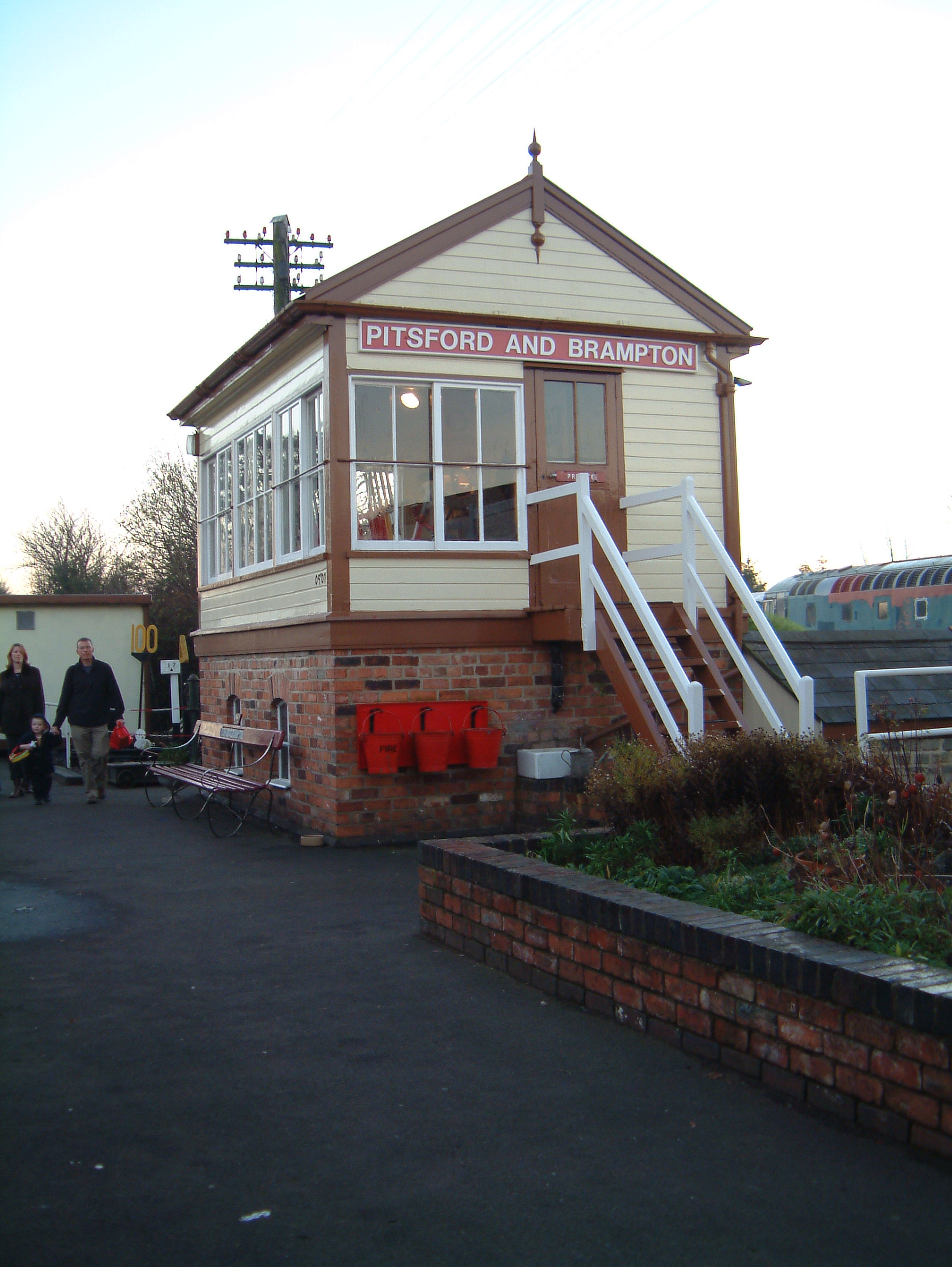
- Platform 1 and station signal box in December 2001

General information
- Location: Chapel Brampton, Northampton; England
- Coordinates: 52.29342°N 0.92403°W
- Grid reference: SP735666
- System: Station on heritage railway
- Owner: London, Midland and Scottish Railway; London Midland Region of British Railways; Northampton & Lamport Railway
- Manager: London and North Western Railway
- Platforms: 3

Key dates
- 16 February 1859: Opened
- 5 June 1950: Closed
- 1984: Start of preservation
- 31 March 1996: Railway's Grand Opening
Location

Pitsford and Brampton railway station is a railway station serving the villages of Pitsford and Chapel Brampton in Northamptonshire, England.

The station was once an intermediate stop on the Northampton-Market Harborough railway line, which closed in 1981. The station has now been revived as the headquarters of a heritage railway called the Northampton & Lamport Railway.

== History ==
The London and North Western Railway originally favoured a site close to where the line crossed the road to Welford, which later became Boughton level crossing. The people of Boughton made representations to the company to try to ensure that it was built there. However, the Earl Spencer wanted the station to be built at the point where the road between Chapel Brampton and Pitsford crossed the line. The railway company were reluctant to do this as the line was in a cutting at this point and the road was very poor. The Earl finally got his way, on condition that he paid for the road improvements.

The station opened on 16 February 1859 as "Pitsford" when the line opened to passenger traffic. In June 1859 it was renamed "Brampton and Pitsford", and then on 1 April 1860 it became "Brampton", then finally "Pitsford and Brampton" on 24 November 1881.

The station had a very quiet career, never having many passengers. A special dock was built for loading sugar beet wagons, a very important local crop at one time. The beet dock was the only part of the station to survive demolition when the station finally closed on 5 June 1950.

== Current station ==
Portable buildings make up the present station, with the exception of the booking office which is the top half of the Lamport signal box and the station signal box which was moved from Little Bowden Crossing, near Market Harborough. The station has three platforms; a single bi-directional platform on the main running line and two north-facing bay platforms.

== See also ==
- Church Brampton railway station – A nearby former rail station on the Northampton loop line.

Preceding station	Heritage railways	Following station
Merry Tom Halt (proposed)	Northampton & Lamport Railway	Boughton
	Disused railways	
Spratton	LNWR; Northampton to Market Harborough line	Northampton (Castle)

== Links ==
https://www.flickr.com/photos/64518788@N05/7764238124/in/album-72157629891912953/
