= Kelmarsh =

Village in Northamptonshire, England

Coordinates: 52.4094°N 0.9166°W

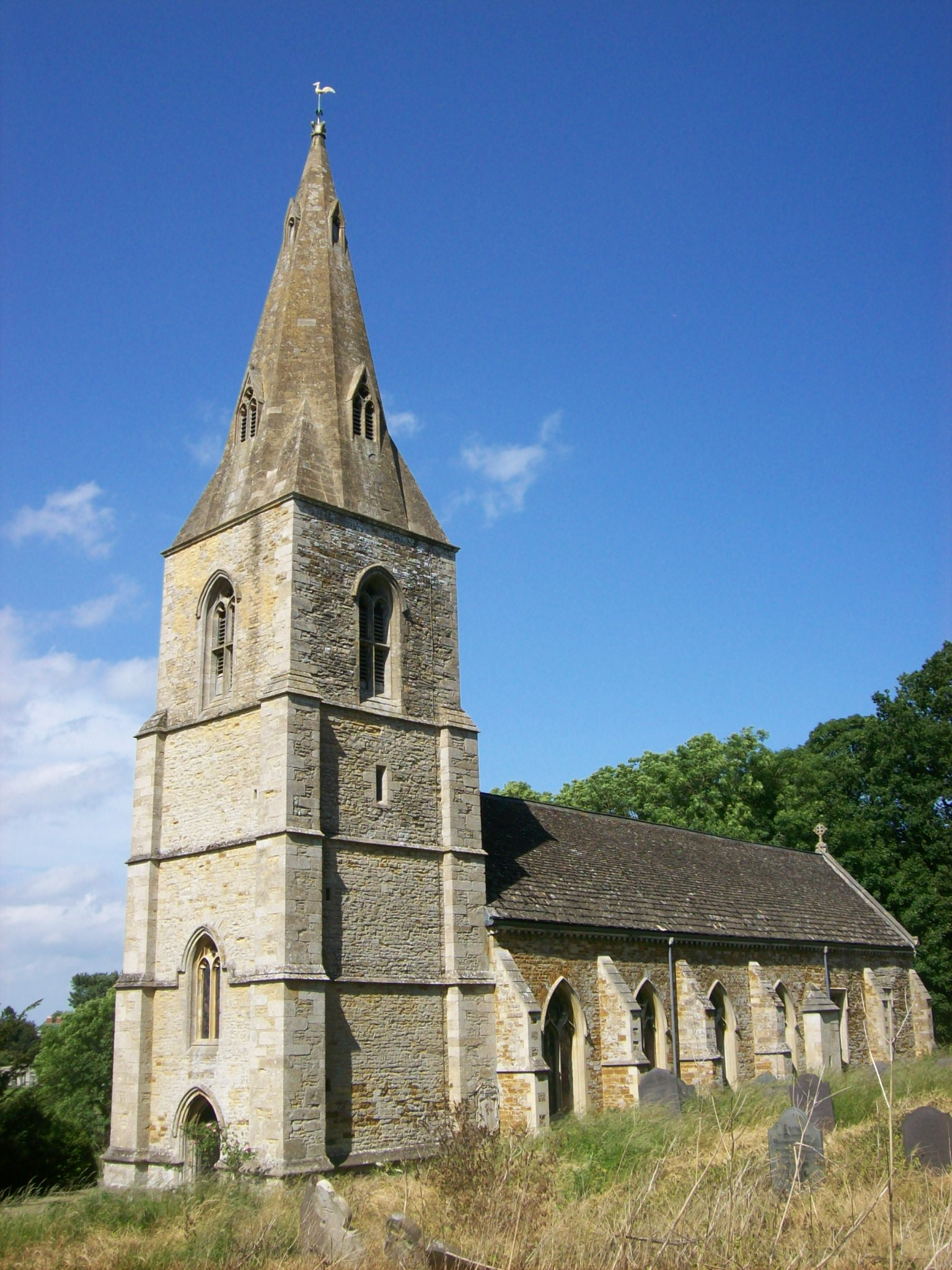
- St Denys' Church

- Location within Northamptonshire
- Population: 208 (2011)
- OS grid reference: SP7379
- Unitary authority: West Northamptonshire
- Ceremonial county: Northamptonshire
- Region: East Midlands
- Country: England
- Sovereign state: United Kingdom
- Post town: Northampton
- Postcode district: NN6
- Dialling code: 01604
- Police: Northamptonshire
- Fire: Northamptonshire
- Ambulance: East Midlands
- UK Parliament: Kettering

Kelmarsh is a village and civil parish in West Northamptonshire, England. The population (including Haselbech) of the civil parish at the 2011 Census was 208. The village is on the A508, close to its junction with the A14 about 5 miles (8 km) south of Market Harborough and 11 miles (18 km) north of Northampton.

The village's name probably means, 'marsh marked out by poles or posts'. The place-name is identical to Chelmarsh, Shropshire; the initial K- reflects Old Norse influence.

== Buildings ==
Kelmarsh Hall is its principal building.

Kelmarsh Tunnel is a former railway tunnel at Kelmarsh now open as part of the Brampton Valley Way.

Between 1859 and 1960 the village was served by Kelmarsh railway station about 2 miles (3.2 km) north-east of the village running trains south to Northampton and north to Market Harborough.
