= Northampton–Market Harborough line =

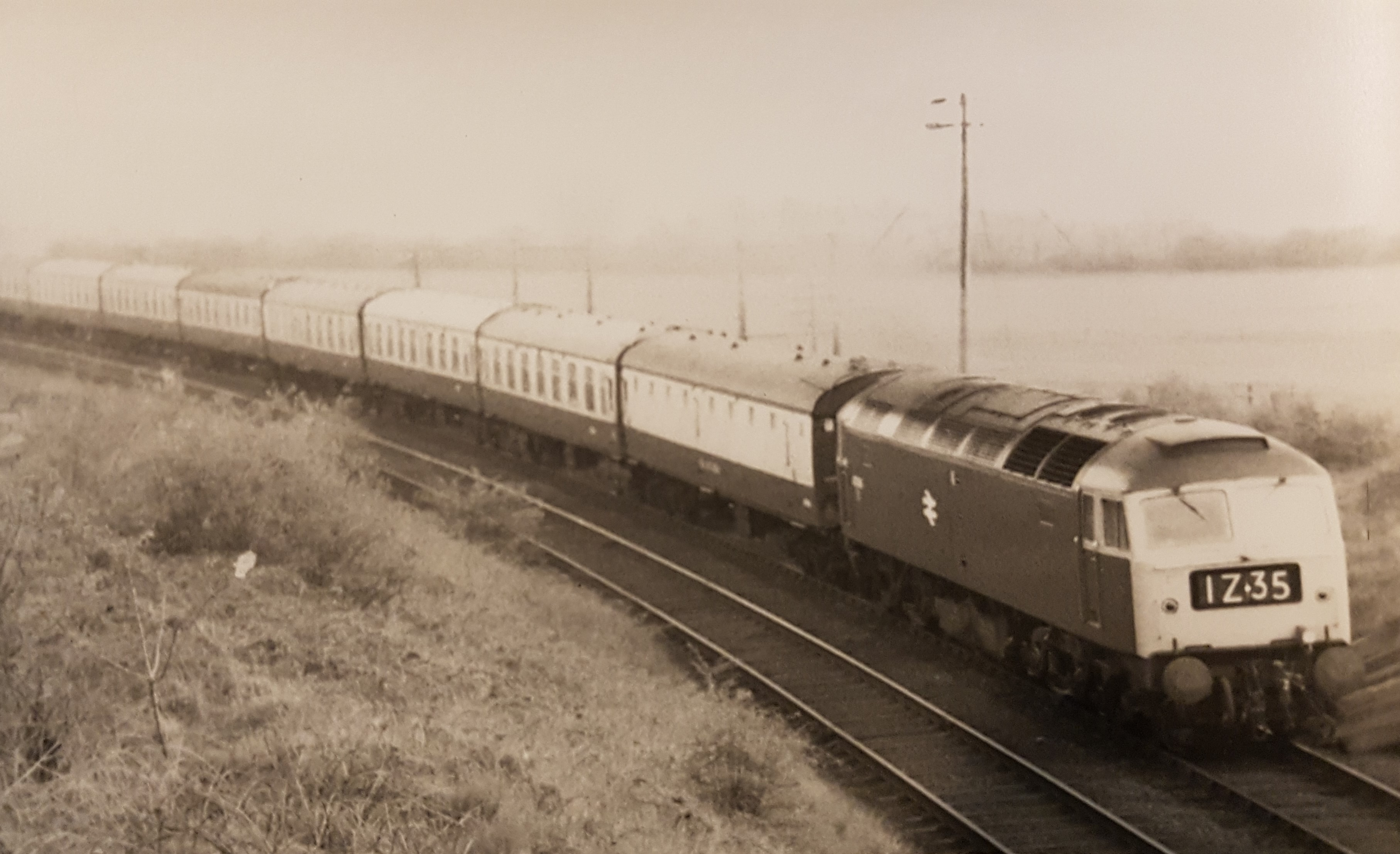
A Class 47 approaches the site of Brixworth station hauling a FA Trophy Final football fan special from Wembley on 26 April 1975.

The Northampton–Market Harborough line is a closed railway line in England. It opened on 16 February 1859 and finally closed on 16 August 1981. The former trackbed is used by the Brampton Valley Way and part of the route has been re-opened as the Northampton & Lamport Railway.

== History ==
In 1851, large deposits of ironstone were discovered in Northamptonshire. The London and North Western Railway (LNWR) proposed a new railway line between Northampton and Market Harborough.

The line was designed by George R. Stephenson (nephew of the Railway Pioneer George Stephenson) and George Parker Bidder, and was opened in 1859.

The line includes two tunnels: Kelmarsh Tunnel, 322 yards (294 m); and Oxendon Tunnel 462 yards (422 m) on the Down line and 453 yards (414 m) on the Up line. The line was originally single-track and was later doubled; hence, each tunnel consists of two separate bores, one for each track. One bore of each tunnel is open as part of the Brampton Valley Way.

In the British Rail report British Railways Network for Development of March 1967, the line was shown as part of the passenger and freight network for development. At about the same time, the two road overbridges along the line were rebuilt in order to provide clearances for 25 kV 50 Hz electrification, which was to be carried through to Leicester. At the time, it was envisaged that the Midland Main Line between Market Harborough and Bedford (despite also being included as "for development" in the report) would be closed to passengers, with services between London and Leicester re-routed via Northampton railway station to London Euston, along with the closure and demolition of London St. Pancras Station. The closure of St. Pancras and the electrification between Northampton and Market Harborough did not take place, but the raised overbridges are still visible at Brampton and Brixworth station sites.

== Stations ==
When the line opened, there were only three intermediate stations, at Pitsford, Brixworth and Lamport. Further stations were opened, although almost all were closed by 1960.

- Northampton (Bridge Street)
- Northampton (Castle) – originally a minor station
- Pitsford and Brampton
- Spratton
- Brixworth
- Lamport
- Kelmarsh
- Clipston and Oxendon
- Market Harborough

The original LNWR station at Market Harborough was on its Stamford to Rugby line which opened in 1850. From 1857 it was shared by the Midland Railway on the "London Extension" from Leicester to Bedford. As traffic built up, the Midland built a new line at a higher elevation, crossing the LNWR and then running parallel to a new joint station in the present position, which opened in 1885.

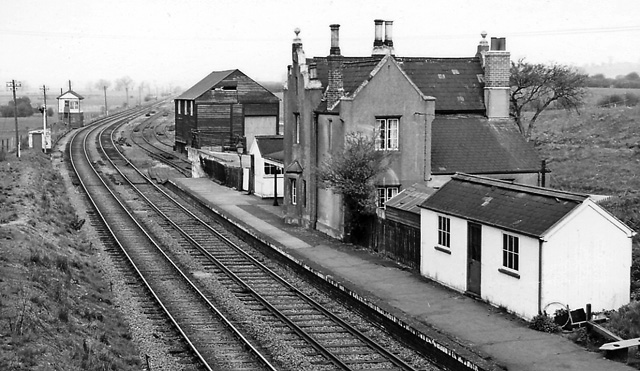
Brixworth Station in 1965

== Closure ==
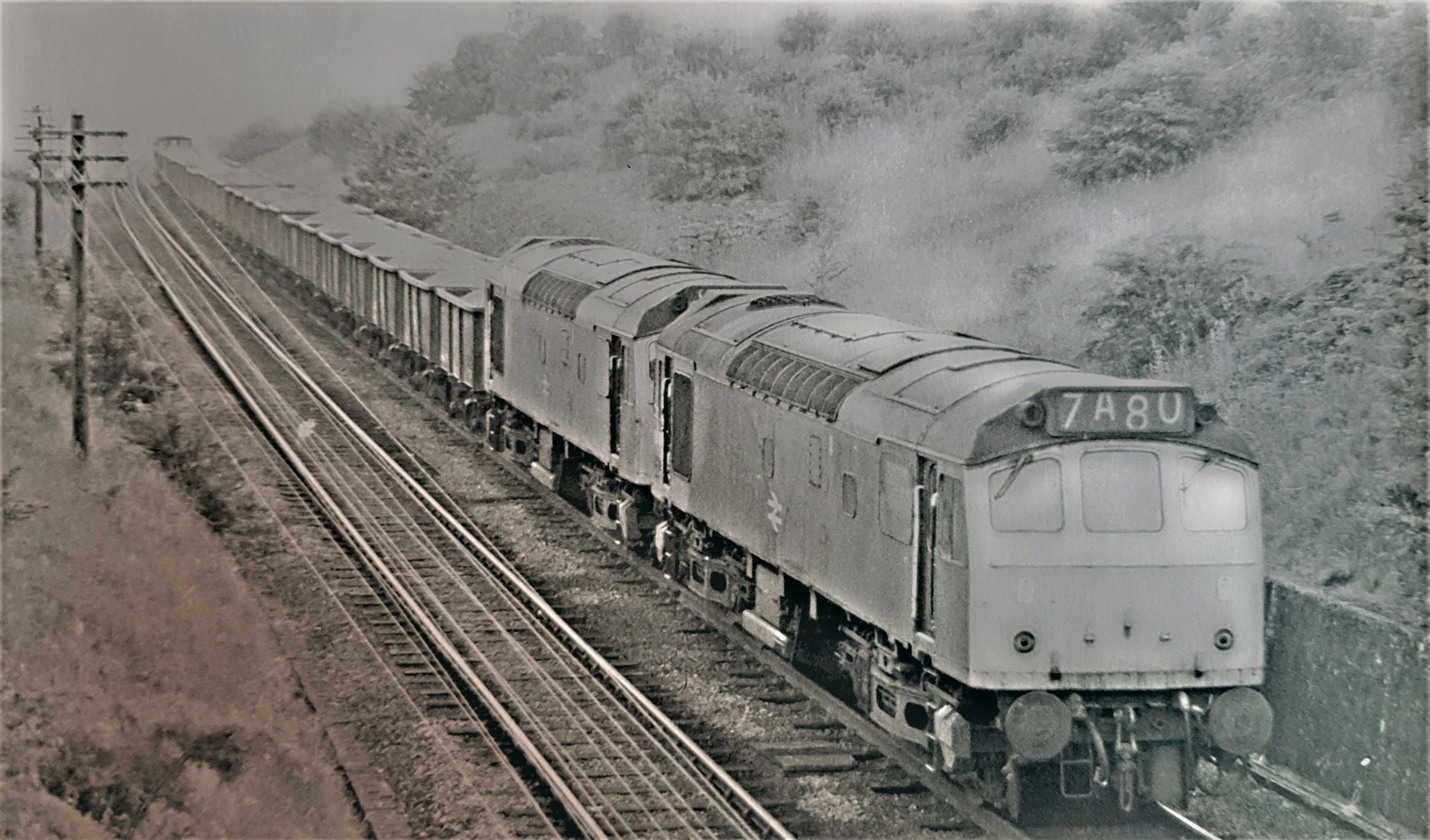
25181 and 25106 lead an aggreate train towards Northampton at Merry Tom Crossing, 06:50, 1975-06-13

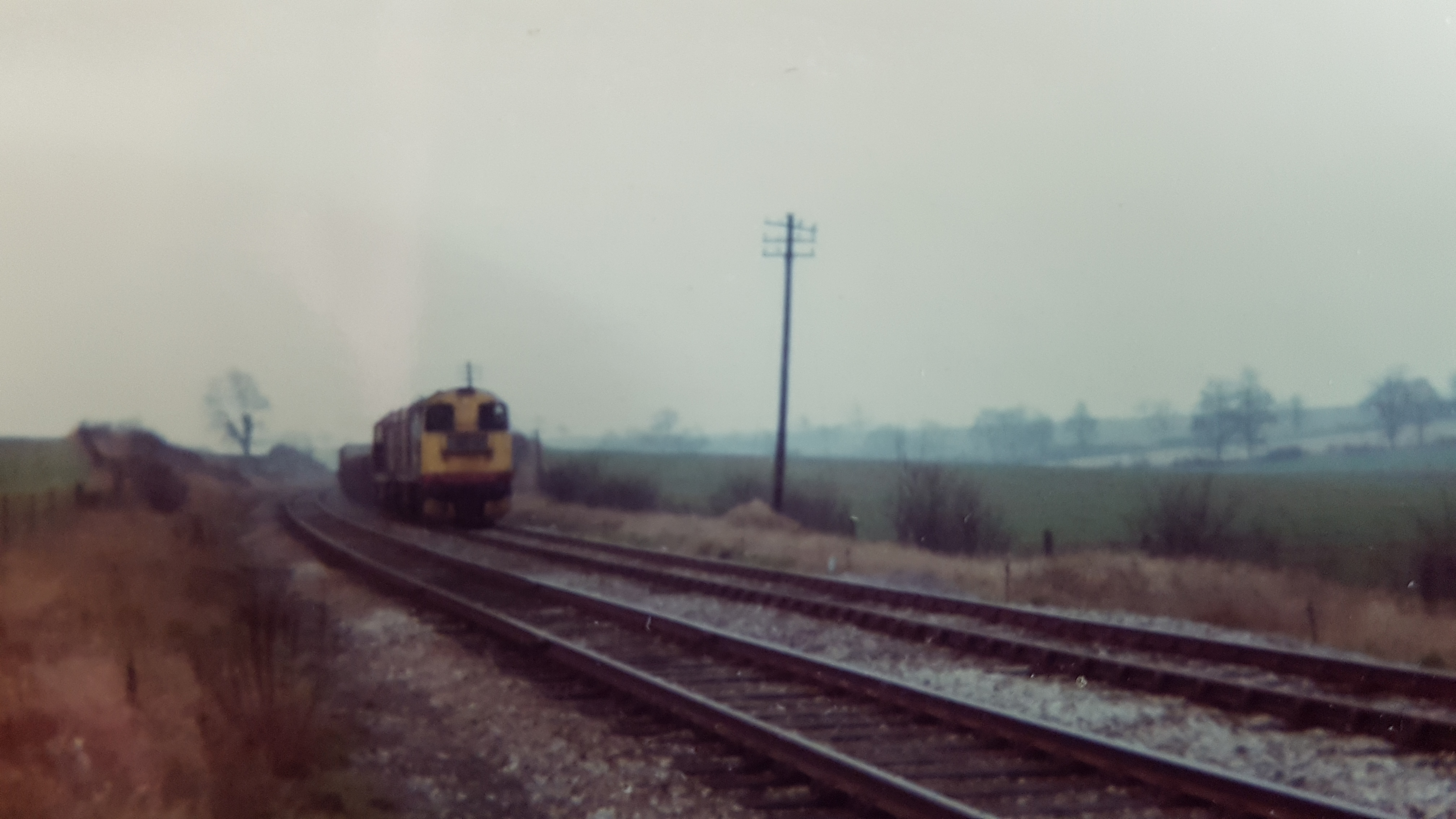
Class 20s 8137 and 8042 lead northbound coal empties past the site of Spratton station on Sunday 1973-03-18. At this time, the line was normally open from 22:00 to 14:00, Mondays to Saturdays. On this occasion, Sunday opening was necessary to clear a traffic backlog after industrial action by rail workers.

The line had a staggered history in its final years. It was first closed to advertised passenger traffic on 4 January 1960 along with all remaining intermediate stations (Spratton station was closed in 1947; Pitsford & Brampton in 1950) but was re-opened to through traffic on 6 January 1969 in conjunction with the re-routing of sleeping car services away from St. Pancras. The one train each way per night was electrically hauled between Euston and Northampton and by a Class 45 locomotive between Northampton and Glasgow. It did not call at Market Harborough. The line was closed to passenger traffic again on 1 May 1969 and reopened on 10 July 1972. The advertised passenger service was finally withdrawn on 26 August 1973, although the line continued to be used by freight trains, football specials and as a diversionary route.

During the 1960s and 1970s, the staple traffic declined considerably, consisting principally of coal trains from the Nottinghamshire coalfields to London and their northbound empties.

The line had several manual level crossings. Each of these required a mechanical signalbox to be maintained and staffed, leading to high fixed costs, which were only slightly reduced by staffing the boxes for only one or two shifts per day, according to traffic needs. Proposals to automate the level crossings were met with hostility by locals in the wake of the Hixon rail crash. Although the line was considered useful by the operators as a diversionary route, the high costs and diminishing coal traffic led to its closure at a time when British Rail was under great pressure from government to close marginal lines.

On 15 August 1981, the day before closure, a special train was chartered to run from Northampton to Market Harborough and return. This was the last British Rail passenger train to run on the line.

== Heritage railway ==
The Welland Valley Rail Revival Group which had campaigned to keep the line open changed its name to Northampton Steam Railway and based itself in the old goods yard at Pitsford and Brampton station. The track was lifted by British Rail and the trackbed was sold to Northamptonshire County Council for use as a "linear park" named the Brampton Valley Way.

The Railway Society arranged to lease part of the trackbed from the county council and began rebuilding the line as a heritage railway. The name was changed in 1992 to Northampton and Lamport Railway due to the presence of a large number of diesel locomotives. The Northampton and Lamport Light Railway Order 1995 (SI 1995/1300) was granted and the grand opening took place on 31 March 1996.

On 30 March 2024, the Northampton and Lamport Railway opened a second station at Boughton allowing trains to run between Pitsford and Brampton and Boughton stations.

There are plans for a future extension to Spratton.

== Potential reopening ==
In October 2019, Transport Secretary Grant Shapps backed proposals to reopen the Northampton–Market Harborough line. The trackbed between Northampton and just south of Market Harborough is intact, however the former trackbed into Market Harborough station has been lost under housing development known as Britannia Walk and a number of other developments have been built on the alignment meaning any reopening of the line would need to be on a new alignment.
