= John Mastin =

English topographer and cleric (1747–1829)

John Mastin (1747–1829) was an English topographer and Anglican clergyman. He was the author of the earliest published history of the parish of Naseby, Northamptonshire.

== Background and family ==
John Mastin was born at Epperstone, Nottinghamshire, on 30 September 1747, son of William Mastin and his wife Ann Baguely. In 1772, he eloped to Scotland with 16-year-old Mary Gurney, whose guardian disapproved of the match. The couple had seven children, born between 1773 and 1791, of whom their two sons died in infancy and only two of the others outlived their father.

== Career ==
Mastin, son of a grazier, worked early in life as a land agent in Hertfordshire. He was unusual among 18th-century Anglican clergy in not being a university graduate. His academic preparations for ordination came solely from private tuition and study. He was ordained deacon on 21 September 1777 and appointed curate of Husbands Bosworth the next day. Two years later he was ordained priest. In 1783, John was appointed Vicar of Naseby, where he had already served as curate – a living he held for the rest of his life. Later he was appointed vicar of two additional parishes: Dunton Bassett in 1802 and Cold Ashby in 1822.

Mastin's memoirs make it clear that for most of his life after ordination, John was active in agricultural matters and submitted essays to the Board of Agriculture.

== Writings ==
In 1792, John Mastin published the first edition of The History and Antiquities of Naseby, in the County of Northampton by subscription. A second edition followed in 1818. Understandably the book records the English Civil War battle that occurred in the parish in 1645. Other material includes an account of agricultural practices, references to contemporary residents, and details of at least some of the memorials and tombstones then present in Naseby church and its churchyard.

In his later years, Mastin compiled memoirs, the manuscript of which is deposited at Northamptonshire Record Office. They give details of his clerical life and record the various land transactions and agricultural activities in which he was active until a few years before his death. The texts of both works are included with a learned introduction, annotations and several relevant appendices in a volume entitled A Georgian Country Parson: the Rev. John Mastin of Naseby.

== Death ==
Mastin died on 15 January 1829 and was buried at Naseby nine days later. Probate was granted by the Archdeaconry Court of Northampton on 21 March 1829.

Mastin's wife had died in 1811. They are both commemorated on a slate plaque fixed to the west end of the inside south wall of Naseby Church.
