= Naseby =

Village in Northamptonshire, England

Coordinates: 52.39692°N 0.98847°W

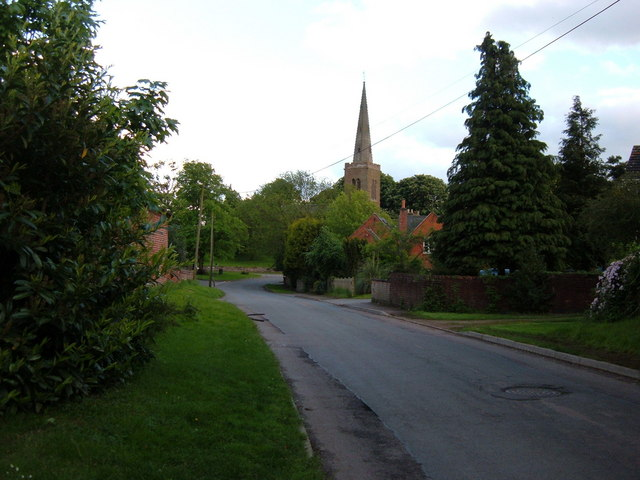

- Location within Northamptonshire
- Population: 687 (2011)
- OS grid reference: SP689781
- Civil parish: Naseby
- Unitary authority: West Northamptonshire
- Ceremonial county: Northamptonshire
- Region: East Midlands
- Country: England
- Sovereign state: United Kingdom
- Post town: NORTHAMPTON
- Postcode district: NN6
- Dialling code: 01604
- Police: Northamptonshire
- Fire: Northamptonshire
- Ambulance: East Midlands
- UK Parliament: Daventry

Naseby is a village and civil parish in West Northamptonshire, England. The population of the civil parish at the 2011 Census was 687.

The village is 14 miles (23 km) north of Northampton, 13.3 miles (21.4 km) northeast of Daventry, and 7 miles (11 km) south of Market Harborough.

== Geography ==
The village sits in a commanding position on one of the highest parts of the Northamptonshire Uplands, close to the county border with Leicestershire.

== History ==
=== Early history ===
The original settlement probably owes its existence to its geography; the village lay in a strong defensive position. In the 6th century a Saxon named Hnaef established the settlement with the name of Hnaefes-Burgh ("fortified place of Hnaef"). Evidence for these origins came in the form of a 19th-century discovery of an Anglo-Saxon trefoil-headed brooch which is now in the collection of the British Museum.

=== Domesday Book to the Black Death ===
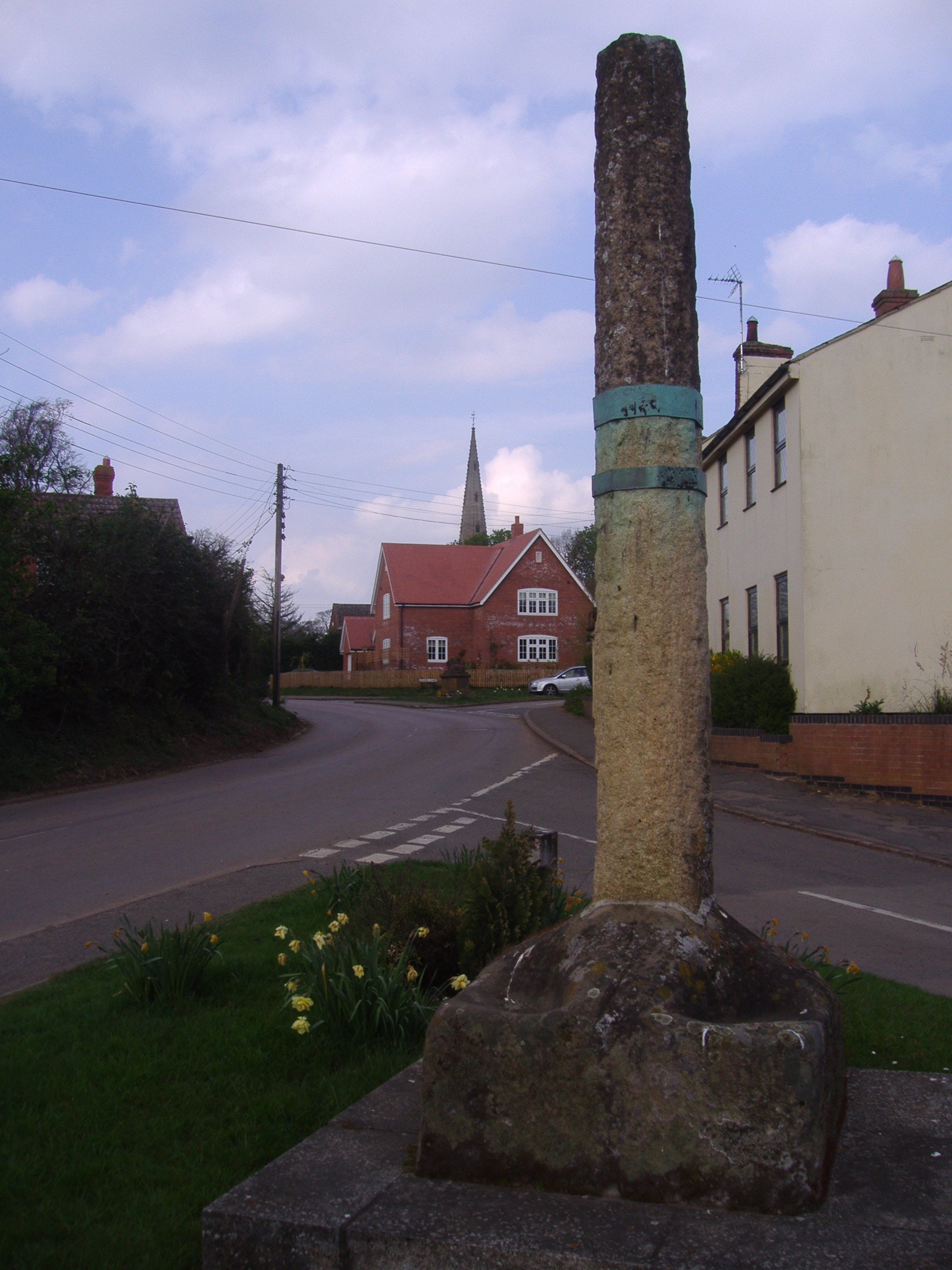
The Old Market Cross

In 1086 Naseby appeared in the Domesday Book, by which time Hnaefes-Burgh had evolved into Navesberie. In later records the village had been known as Navesby and Nathesby, eventually becoming Naseby. It was believed that the name derived from the Old English naefela, meaning navel, because it was thought to be the navel of England. In 1203, King John granted Naseby its market charter and the village became a flourishing market town for many years.

During this period the village grew. In 1349, the Black Death, which wiped out a third of the population of England, attacked the village and greatly reduced its population, with parts becoming abandoned altogether. Extensive earthworks in the fields adjacent to parts of the village show the outlines of lost lanes and the outlines of buildings and enclosures which existed before the Black Death.

=== Battle of Naseby ===
The Battle of Naseby took place on 14 June 1645, during the English Civil War. In the area called Broad Moor a small distance north of the village, the Royalist forces, commanded by King Charles I, battled the Roundhead army commanded by Thomas Fairfax, 3rd Lord Fairfax of Cameron. The battle resulted in a decisive Royalist defeat.

A naval warship during the Commonwealth period was named the Naseby in honour of the battle; after the Restoration the ship was renamed Royal Charles.

=== 18th century ===
During the 18th century, Naseby continued as an agricultural community and during this time several fine Georgian buildings were constructed in the parish, including Manor Farm (built 1720), Shuckburgh House (1773), and the old Vicarage (1785). One of the most significant buildings is Naseby House, built in 1818 for the Fitzgeralds, Lords of the Manor. In the 20th century the hall hosted the Duke of York, later King George VI, with the Duchess of York, Elizabeth Bowes-Lyon (the Queen Mother) and a very young future Queen Elizabeth. Naseby Hall, altered by E F Law in 1859 was badly damaged by fire in 1948, and was rebuilt from the ground up using the old materials.

Rev John Mastin was vicar of Naseby from 1783 until his death in 1829. He was the author of "The History and Antiquities of Naseby, in the County of Northampton", which was the earliest published history of the parish. He also left a manuscript account of his life. The texts of both these works are included in a 2004 publication by the Northamptonshire Record Society.

=== Nineteenth century ===
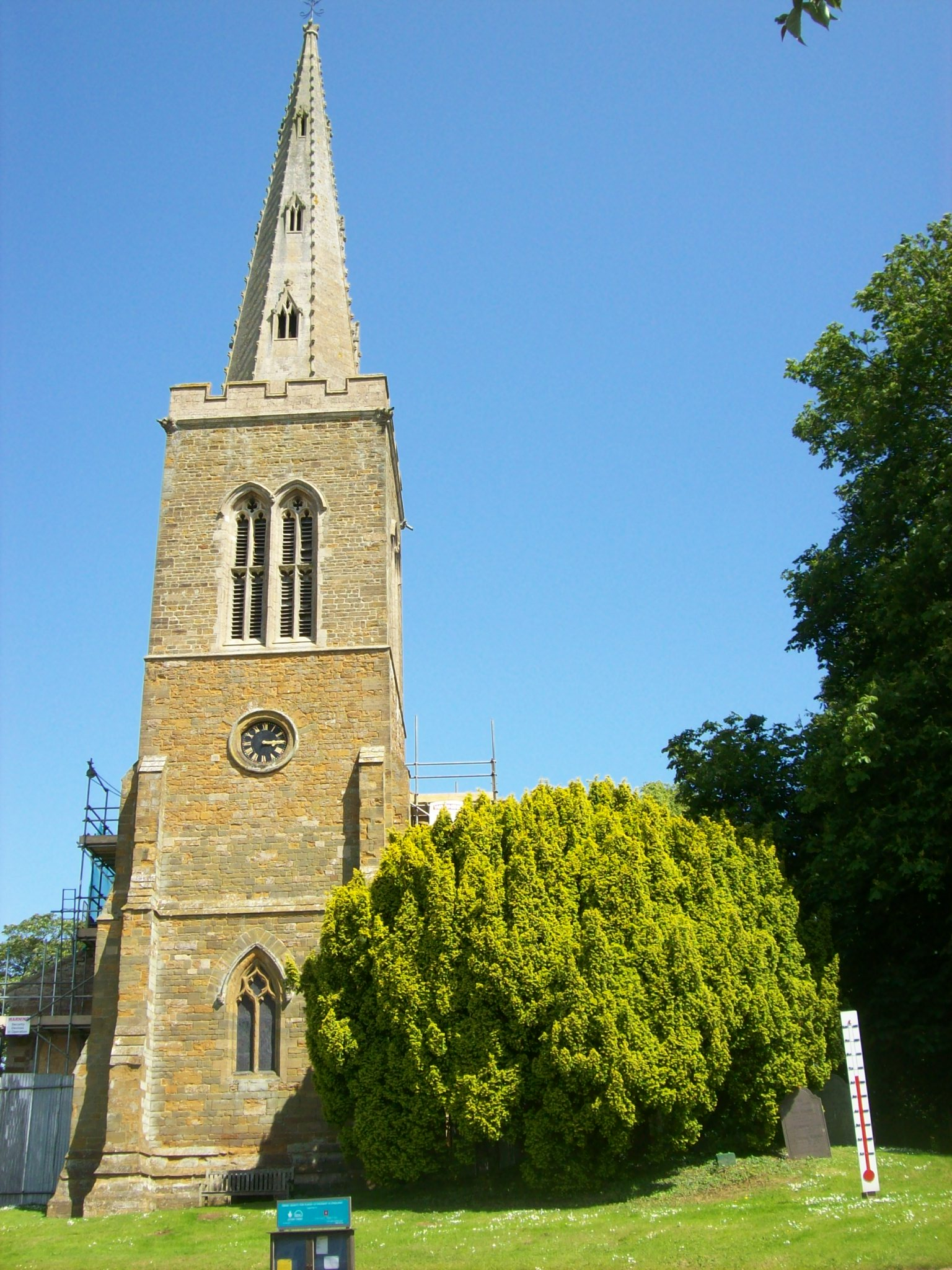
All Saints church had a peak of baptisms in June 1837

In 1822 the Enclosure commissioners allocated the open land around the village to two landowners, who duly fenced off their newly acquired fields. This action deprived many of the villagers of their traditional plots of land that surrounded the village, that had for years allowed them to grow crops and graze their cattle and sheep. This action did not adversely affect the community as much as it did in other villages; one reason may have been that the village had other trades. A survey of the time lists 26 different occupations and trades in the village.

==== 1837 baptisms ====
The local friendly society attracted non-conformists from the end of the eighteenth century and in 1825, a Methodist chapel was erected. The population continued to grow: thus between 1831 and 1841 it increased from 707 to 898 (including 48 visitors to the annual feast). In 1837, following the passing of the Births and Deaths Registration Act 1836 there was a peak in the number of baptisms recorded in the Naseby parish register, relating to All Saints church. Whereas during the previous ten years the number per annum had varied between 7 and 24, in 1837 there were a total of 91 baptisms which amounted to 10.7% of the population given in the 1841 census. 50 of these occurred in the week before 1 July when civil registration was made mandatory. Most of those baptised were over the age of one, mostly children with the oldest age recorded being 26. One view is the prevalence of baptisms in this year is that non-conformists wished to ensure their children and young adults were recorded before the introduction of civil registration.

==== Victorian building boom ====
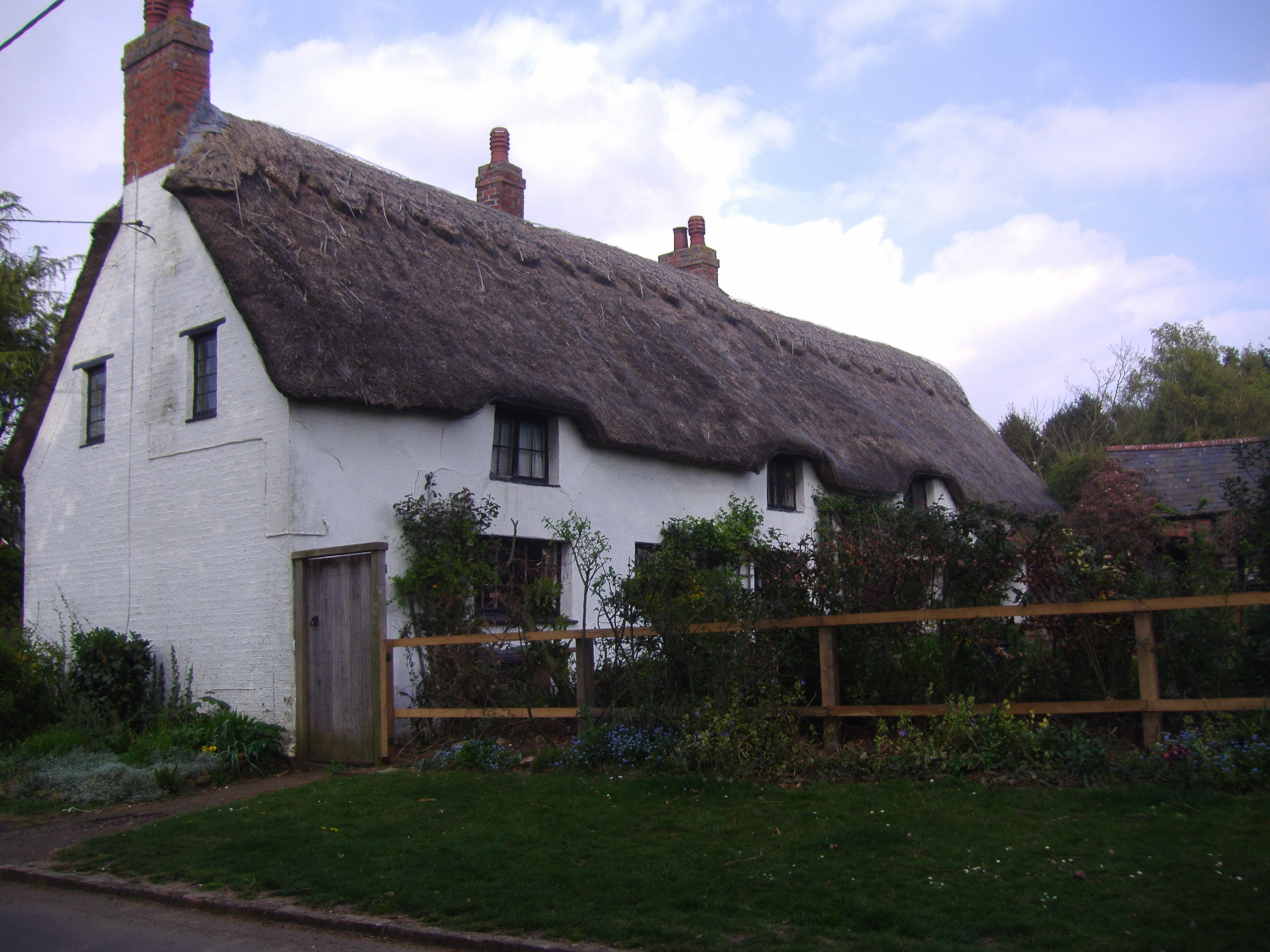
One of the two remaining cob and thatched cottages in the village

Until around 1870, most buildings (except for the church, chapel, school, and the three houses from the Georgian period) were made of mud walls and cob with thatched roofs. During the 1870s Lord Clifden had most of the cottages demolished and replaced with new red-brick cottages, some of which were semi-detached, to house his estate workers. This gave Naseby its well-known Victorian appearance. All these Victorian houses still survive to this day, along with two remaining 17th-century cob and thatched cottages.

== Churches ==
The two churches in Naseby are:

- All Saints' Church, Church Street
- Naseby Methodist Church, Church Street

== River sources ==
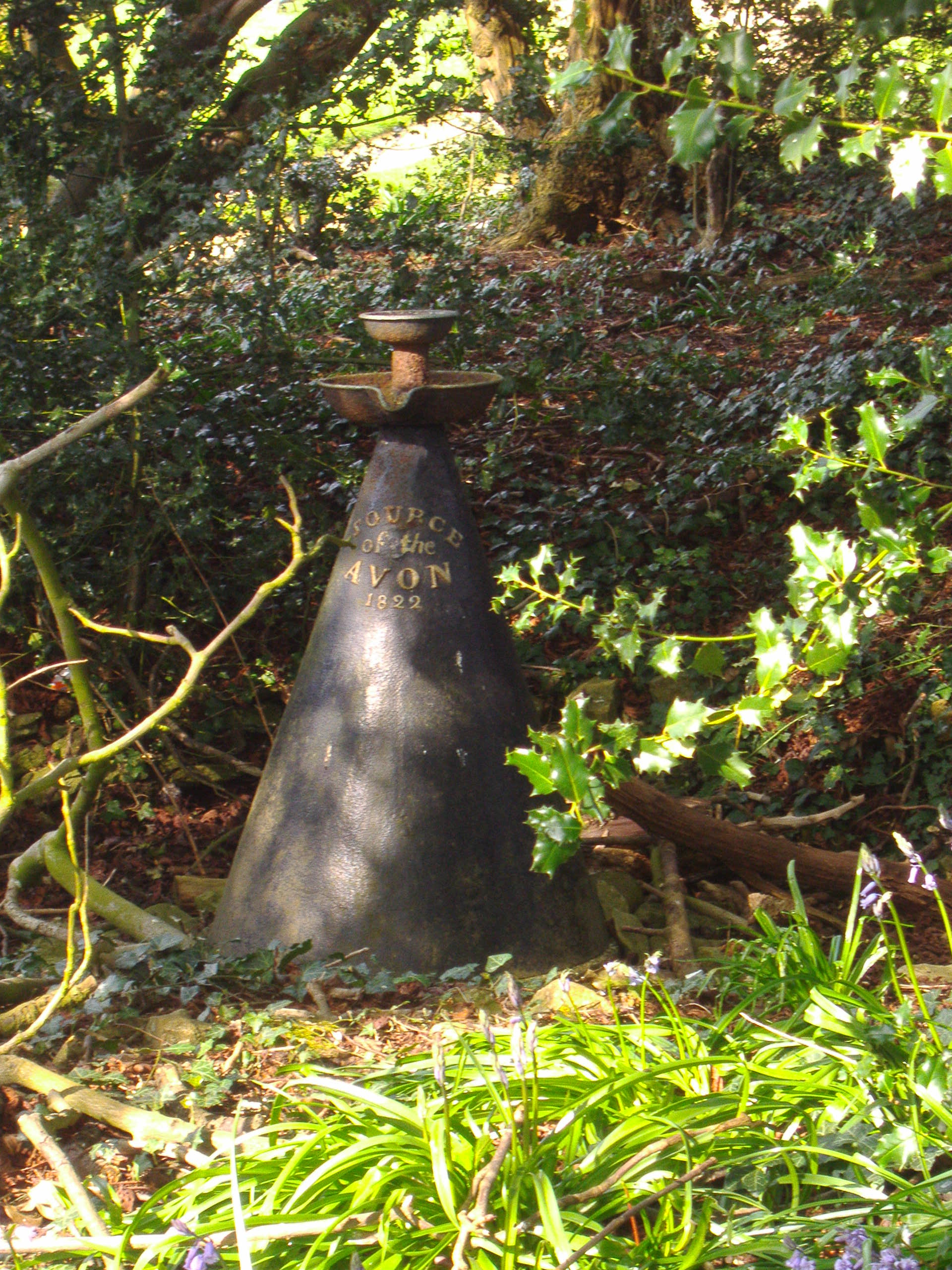
The source of the River Avon in the grounds of Manor Farm

Naseby and the plateau of land towards Sibbertoft form a watershed and contain the sources of four rivers flowing west, south and east.

In the front garden of Manor Farm at the junction of Church Street, Newlands and Welford Road is a cone-shaped monument which sits in a depression. This is the source of the River Avon, Warwickshire.

The northern tributary of the River Nene (Brampton Arm) arises by the Thornby road to the west of the village (the main Source being at Arbury Hill (SP 542 581) near Staverton, Northamptonshire).

The source of the River Ise can be found close to Sibbertoft Road to the north of Naseby.

The source of the River Welland can be found in fields close to Welland Rise, Sibbertoft village, three miles to the north.

== Notable buildings ==
The Historic England website contains details of a total of ten listed buildings in the parish of Naseby, all of which are Grade II apart from All Saints' Church, which is Grade II*. They are:

- All Saints' Church, Church Street
- Naseby Hall
- Shuckburgh House, Church Street
- Monument, Clipston Road
- Caton Cottage, High Street
- Cromwell Cottage, High Street
- Avon Well, south of Manor Farmhouse, Newlands
- Manor Farm, Newlands
- Whipping Cross, Newlands, Haselbech & Clipston Road
- Monument, Sibbertoft Road

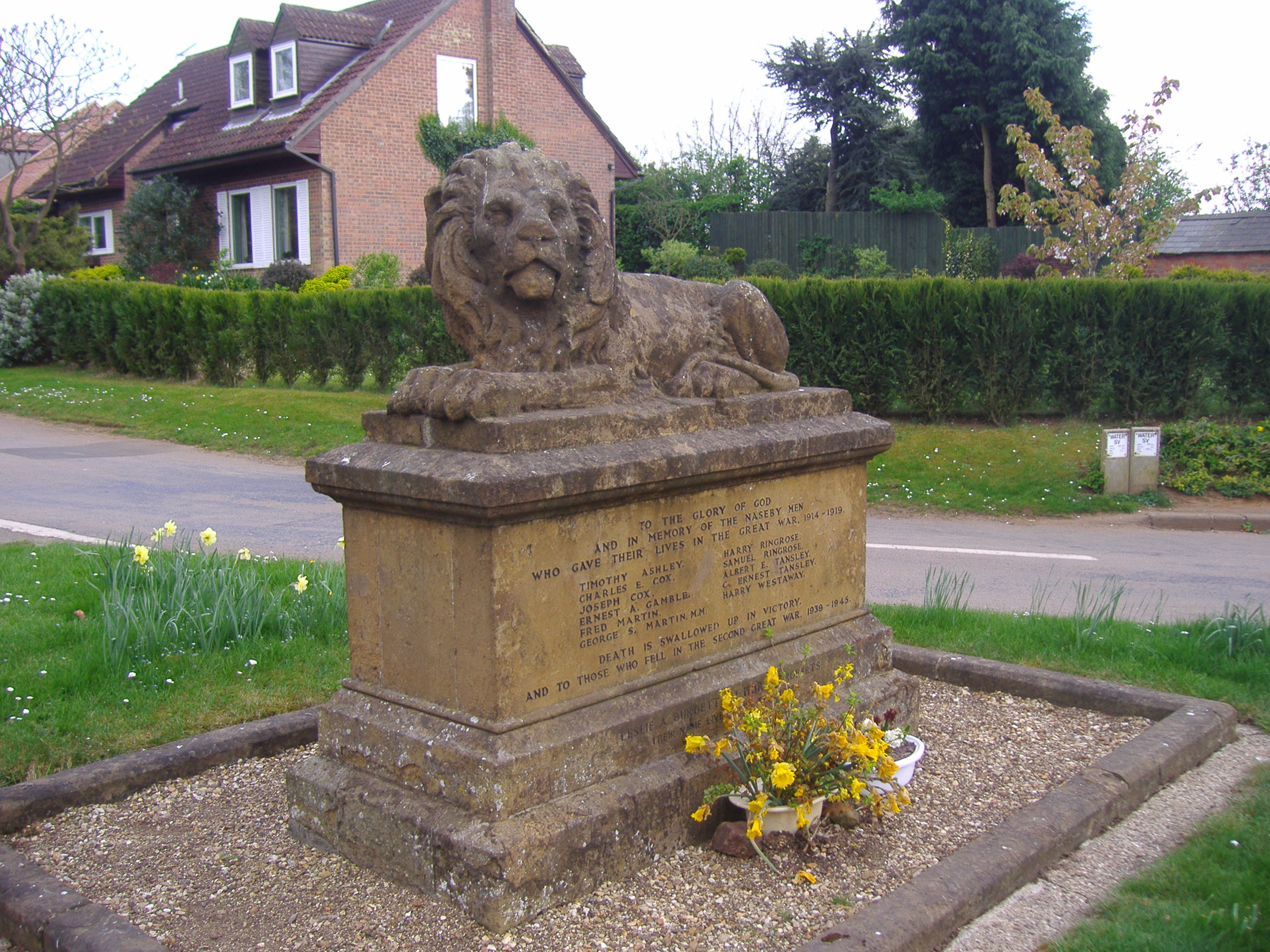
War memorial

Details of some of these and other notable buildings in the village appear below.

Within the village at the junction of Church Street and Gynwell, close to the Methodist Chapel (1825) there is the shaft of the old whipping post dating to 1203. In the Middle Ages this stood opposite the church in what was the marketplace and is now the village street called Newlands.

Also to be found in Newlands are examples of the Victorian cottages from around 1870, which continue down the right-hand side of High Street; further down the street to the right is one of the two surviving cob-thatched cottages. It was built around 1630 and is now called Cromwell Cottage. Next door to the cottage in School Lane is the village school, built in 1843.

Further down School Lane are more Victorian cottages. At the end of School Lane with its intersection with Church Lane is the village war memorial. This memorial, built in 1918 to commemorate World War I, is a smaller copy of one of Edwin Henry Landseer's four lions at Nelson's Column in London's Trafalgar Square. On the opposite side of Church Street from the memorial is the Old Vicarage, built around 1785. The two beech trees at the entrance were planted in 1792. Next to the vicarage is Shuckburgh House which dates from around 1773. The other surviving cob thatched cottage can be found at the southern end of High Street.

== Transport ==
Naseby is 2.4 mi (3.9 km) from Junction 2 of the A14 road, giving it access to the national road system. For rail travel, the Midland Main Line can be accessed at the railway station in Market Harborough. There is a bus service between Market Harborough and Northampton that stops in Naseby, but it is very infrequent.
