= Brampton Valley Way =

14-mile rail trail in East Midlands, England

Coordinates: 52°21′44″N 0°54′20″W

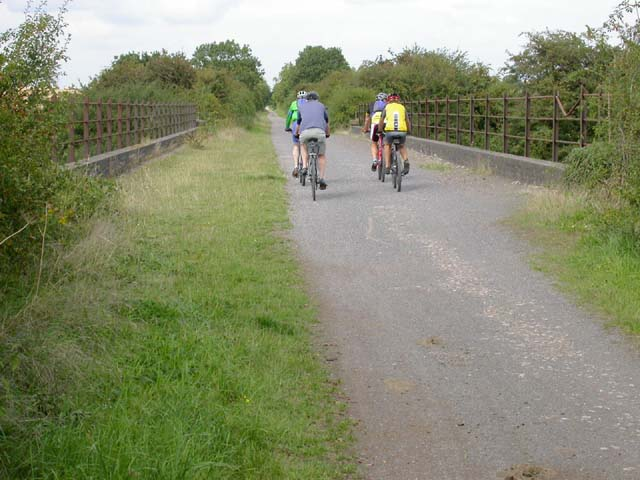
- Cyclists cross a disused railway bridge at Bridge 14 on the Brampton Valley Way in August 2006
- Length: 14 mi (23 km)
- Location: The Midlands, England
- Designation: UK National Trail
- Trailheads: Northampton, Northamptonshire; Market Harborough, Leicestershire
- Use: Hiking, cycling

The Brampton Valley Way is a 14-mile (23 km) rail trail built on the way of the former Northampton to Market Harborough Railway in Northamptonshire, England. It forms what trail managers, Northamptonshire County Council, describe as a linear park.

The railway line was closed in 1981 and the 13-mile (21 km) Northamptonshire section was purchased by Northamptonshire County Council with grant aid from the Countryside Commission in 1987, when work began on developing it as a linear park. The 1-mile (1.6 km) section north of the county boundary is owned by Leicestershire County Council. Management of the complete route is now undertaken by Leicestershire County Council, West Northamptonshire Council, and Sustrans.

The Brampton Valley Way, from Boughton Crossing in Northampton to Little Bowden Crossing in Market Harborough, was opened in the spring of 1993 and provides recreational access for cyclists and walkers. Further developments to enhance access continue alongside everyday management of the site. The Way forms an offroad section of the Sustrans National Cycle Network Route 6.

There are two former railway tunnels on the route, Kelmarsh (480 metres or 520 yards) and Oxendon (422 metres or 462 yards). The tunnels are unlit and so can be quite an experience to travel through, although alternative routes over the tunnels are provided.

A section of the Brampton Valley Way runs adjacent to the Northampton & Lamport Railway. The railway is separated from the linear park by a stout safety fence. As the railway extends, so the fence will be erected first to protect members of the public from the works. The Midshires Way passes through the Brampton Valley Way.
