= Kelmarsh Tunnel =

Disused railway tunnels in Northamptonshire, England

Coordinates: 52.4067°N 0.8966°W

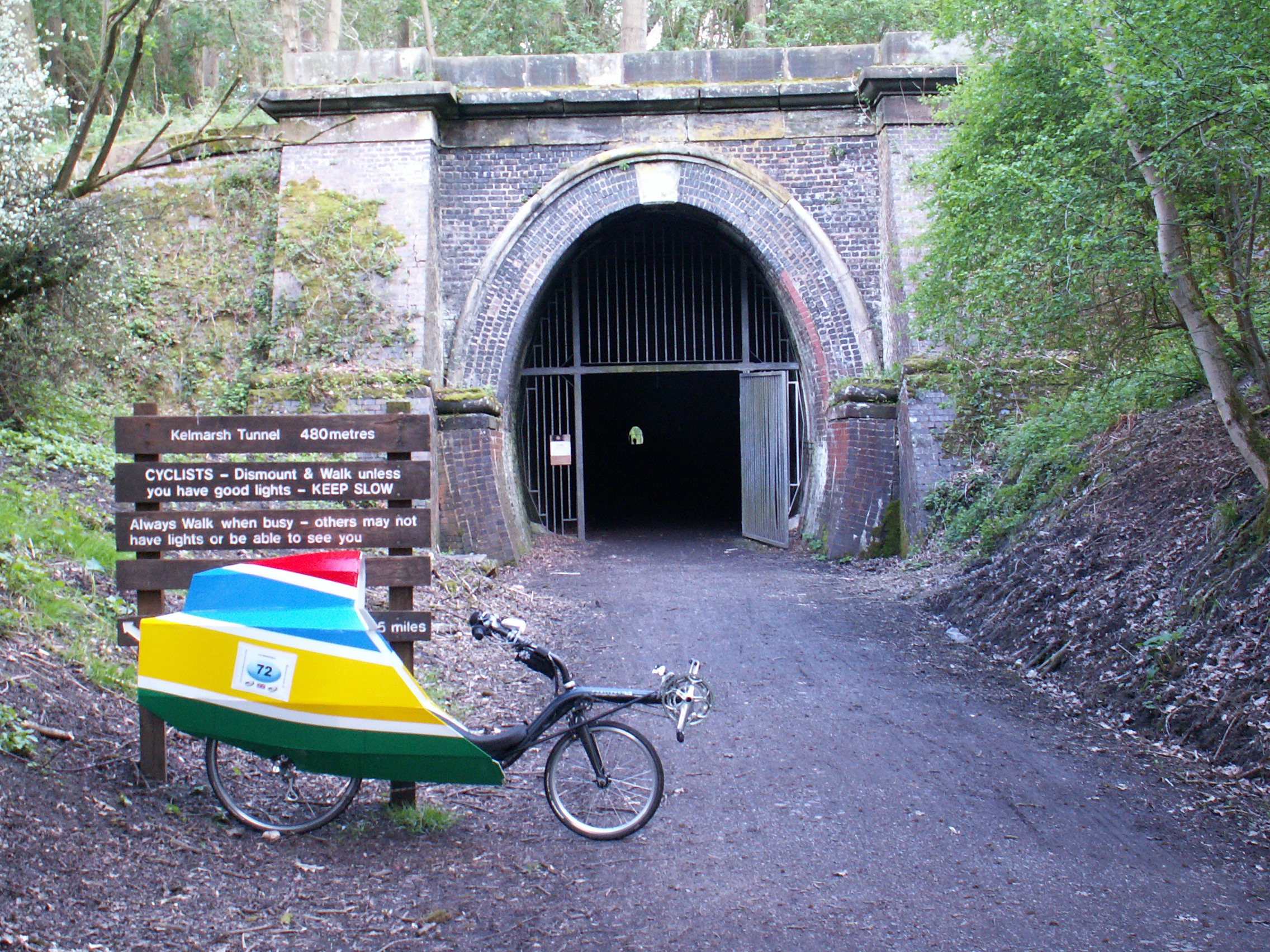
North portal of Kelmarsh Tunnel

The Kelmarsh Tunnels are disused railway tunnels in Northamptonshire, England. The Northampton to Market Harborough line opened in 1859 and had tunnels at Kelmarsh and nearby Oxendon.

The original tunnel was single-track, and when the line was doubled a second single-track tunnel was built. Due to the small bore, the tunnels were known as "the rat-holes" by train drivers.

The former "up" line tunnel at Kelmarsh is open as part of the Brampton Valley Way, a linear park which runs from Boughton level crossing on the outskirts of Northampton to Little Bowden near Market Harborough, on the former railway trackbed.

A species of moth Triphosa dubitata has been observed to overwinter inside Kelmarsh Tunnel.

The tunnel is easily navigated on foot or by cyclists, and the open bore has been effectively restored but is unlit. The sign on site placed by the council indicates the tunnel length as 480 metres (1,570 ft).

The other bore is sometimes accessible from one end but unsafe. the ventilation shafts approximately half of the way through lets in light water and air; also these do not have covers on so are considered unsafe.

== See also ==
- Tunnels in the United Kingdom
