= Clipston, Northamptonshire =

Village in Northamptonshire, England

Coordinates: 52.4268°N 0.9499°W

Clipston
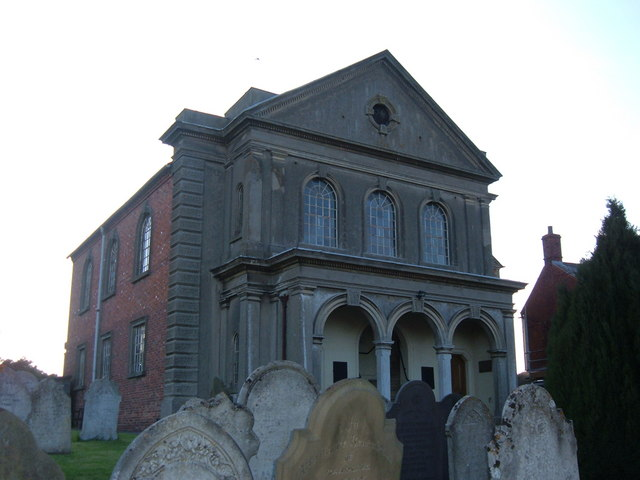
- Clipston Chapel

- Location within Northamptonshire
- Population: 643 (2011 Census)
- OS grid reference: SP7181
- Civil parish: Clipston
- Unitary authority: West Northamptonshire
- Ceremonial county: Northamptonshire
- Region: East Midlands
- Country: England
- Sovereign state: United Kingdom
- Post town: MARKET HARBOROUGH
- Postcode district: LE16
- Dialling code: 01858
- Police: Northamptonshire
- Fire: Northamptonshire
- Ambulance: East Midlands
- UK Parliament: Kettering
- Website: Clipston Parish Council

Clipston is a village and civil parish in the West Northamptonshire unitary authority area of Northamptonshire, England. The village lies around 4 miles (6.4 km) south-southwest of the town of Market Harborough in the neighbouring county of Leicestershire. At the 2011 Census, the population of the parish was 643, an increase from 613 at the 2001 Census.

== Buildings and facilities ==
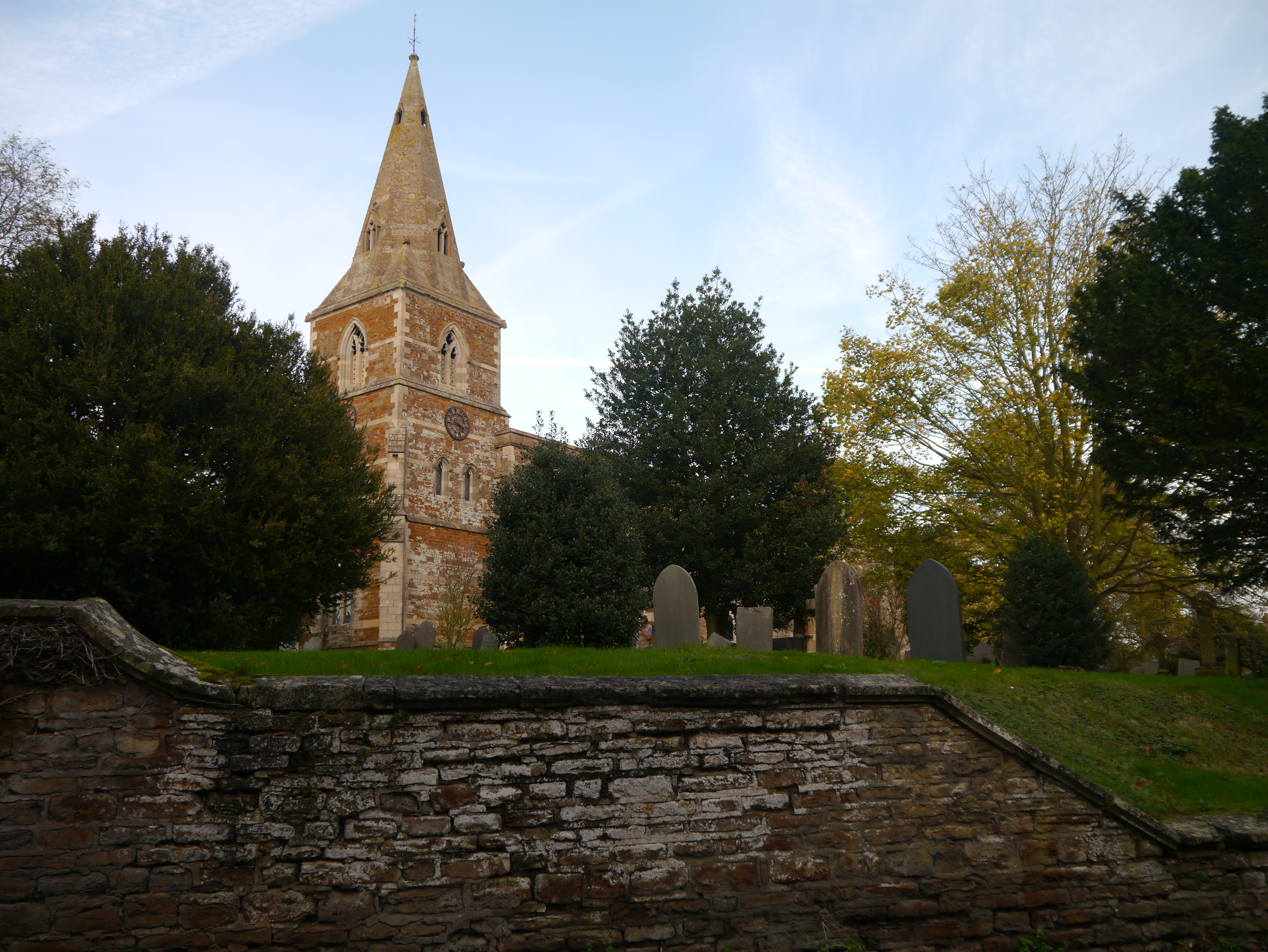
All Saints Church

All Saints Church is a Grade I listed building, dating from the early 13th century. There are many 17th and 18th century monuments to the Buswell family of London merchants.

The Baptist Chapel of 1803 has a front by Edmund Francis Law of 1864.

To the west of the church is Clipston Primary School. The school was previously used as a hospital and dates back to 1667–73. The school celebrated its 350th birthday in 2017. A distinctive feature of the school is its one handed clock that appears at the front of the building.

Clipston has a pub The Bull's Head.

There is a village hall and a green.

Between 1859 and 1960 the village was served by Clipston and Oxendon railway station about 3 miles north-east of the village and running trains between Northampton in the south and Market Harborough in the north.
