= Oxendon Tunnels =

Railway tunnels in Northamptonshire, England

Coordinates: 52.4428°N 0.9157°W

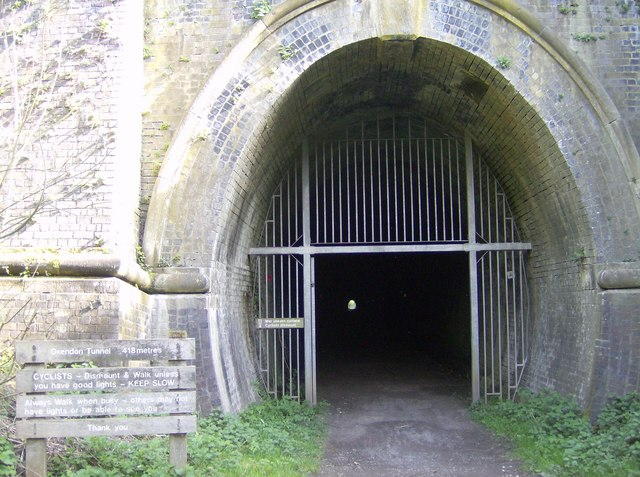
South portal of Oxendon tunnel

The Oxendon Tunnels are disused railway tunnels in Northamptonshire, England. The Northampton to Market Harborough line opened in 1859 and had tunnels at Oxendon and nearby at Kelmarsh. However, construction of the tunnels was a protracted process and they were not completed until February 1878.

The original tunnel was single-track, and when the line was doubled a second single-track tunnel was built. The "up" line tunnel is 453 yards (414 m) long while the "down" line is 462 yards (422 m). Due to the small bore, the tunnels were known as "the rat-holes" by train drivers.

The former "up" line tunnel at Oxendon is open as part of the Brampton Valley Way, a linear park which runs from Boughton level crossing on the outskirts of Northampton to Little Bowden near Market Harborough, on the former railway trackbed.

== See also ==
- Tunnels in the United Kingdom
