= Northampton and Lamport Railway =

Heritage railway in the UK

Coordinates: 52°17′36″N 0°55′24″W

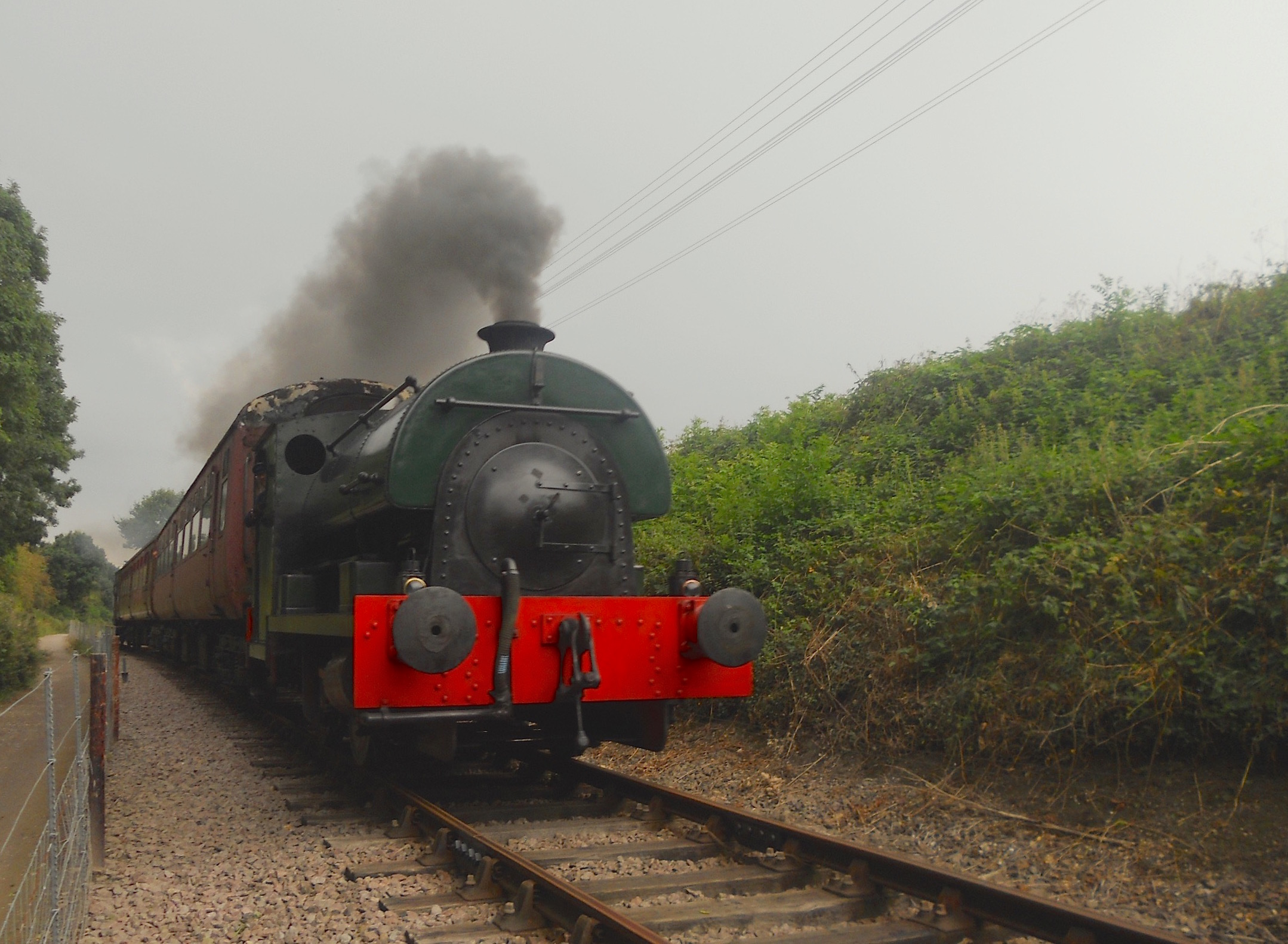
- Peckett 0-4-0ST Works No. 2104 with a train in August 2016
- Locale: England
- Terminus: Pitsford and Brampton

Commercial operations
- Name: Northampton to Market Harborough line ("Harborough Line")
- Built by: London and North Western Railway
- Original gauge: 4 ft 8 1/2 in (1,435 mm) standard gauge

Preserved operations
- Operated by: Northampton & Lamport Railway Preservation Society
- Stations: 2
- Length: 1 1/2 miles (2.4 km)
- Preserved gauge: 4 ft 8 1/2 in (1,435 mm) standard gauge

Commercial history
- Opened: 16 February 1859
- Closed: 16 August 1981

Preservation history
- 1984: Work started at (and around) Pitsford and Brampton station site
- November 1995: Light railway order granted with first public passenger train operated
- 31 March 1996: Grand Re-opening (NLR re-opened, officially)
- 30 March 2024: Opening of Boughton station
- Headquarters: Pitsford and Brampton

Website
- www.nlr.org.uk

The Northampton and Lamport Railway is a standard gauge heritage railway in Northamptonshire, England. It is based at Pitsford and Brampton station, near the villages of Pitsford and Chapel Brampton, roughly 5 miles (8.0 km) north of Northampton.

== Overview ==
The line between Northampton and Market Harborough was finally closed (by British Rail) on 16 August 1981, the intermediate stations on the route having been closed for many years.

In 1984 (just three years after the line's closure), a group was formed by Michael William Papworth (of Northampton) with the intention of re-opening a section of the line as a heritage railway. The site opened to the public shortly afterwards. Following the granting of the Northampton and Lamport Light Railway Order 1995 (SI 1995/1300), the line carried its first fare-paying passengers in November 1995. The official grand opening ceremony took place (just four months later) on 31 March 1996.

Currently, passenger trains operate on a section of line approximately 1 1/2 miles (2.4 km) in length, between Pitsford and Brampton and Boughton.

An extension to the original length of running line was opened on 30th March 2024 along with a station including sidings and run-round loop at the former Boughton Crossing on the A5199.

A northern extension of the NLR to Spratton currently remains within the planning stage. The previous extension heading north, opened after several years' work and around £50,000 was spent on repairs to Bridge 13. The same amount (or more) will be required for Bridge 14, which will allow the opening of another short extension to Merry Tom Crossing.

The signalling system, with three working signal boxes (at Pitsford and Brampton station, Pitsford Sidings and Boughton), makes it one of the most comprehensive and detailed on any heritage railway of its size, within Preservation. The Booking Office at Pitsford and Brampton station was built using the disused Lamport signal box, originally located around 5 1/2 miles (8.9 km) away on/up the same line. It had since been converted in such a way that it can be easily converted back into a signal box if whenever required in the future.

The Brampton Valley Way is a "linear park" offering a traffic-free route for walkers, cyclists and pedestrians, and which runs alongside the railway, separated by a stout safety fence. Access is also available to horse riders on other sections away from the railway.

The railway is open for viewing from 10:00 to 17:00 on Sundays. Train rides are available on Sundays from March to October, diesel hauled with steam-hauled trains for special events (subject to availability). Open from March to October and throughout December for Santa's visit.

== Events ==
On 18 July 2007, the Railway at War weekend, an event held at the railway every September, was named Best Event in the 2007 Northamptonshire Renaissance Heritage Awards.

== Rolling Stock ==
=== Locomotives ===
==== Steam Locomotives ====
- Andrew Barclay 0-6-0T No. 1605 Ajax. Built in 1918. Acquired from the Isle of Wight Steam Railway in 2024.
- Andrew Barclay & Sons 0-4-0ST No. 776 “Firefly“ (Under Restoration)
- Andrew Barclay & Sons 0-4-0ST No.2323 “Irchester Quarries No.9” (Under Restoration)
- Hawthorn Leslie 0-4-0ST No. 3718 “Swanscombe No.4” (Under repair)
- Hawthorn Leslie 0-6-0ST No. 3837 "No.16" (Awaiting restoration)
- Hunslet ‘Austerity’ 0-6-0ST No. 3193 (Operational)

==== Diesel ====
===== Mainline Diesels =====
- Class 31/1 No. 31289 (D5821) “Phoenix” (Operational)
- Class 31/1 No. 31601 “Devon Diesel Society” Brush Type 2 (Operational)
- Class 47/0 Co-Co No. 47205 (Operational)

===== Shunter Diesels =====
- Ruston & Hornsby 0-6-0 No.53 165DS “Sir Alfred Wood“ (Awaiting Repairs)
- Ruston & Hornsby 0-4-0 No. 764 165DS “Sir Gyles Isham“ (Operational)

=== Coaches ===
==== Ex BR Non Passenger Carrying Coaching Stock (NPCCS) ====
- № M37326 CCT – Covered Carriage Truck (ex-L.M.S. design)

==== Ex BR Mark 1 Coaches ====
- № 1647 RBR – Restaurant Buffet Refurbished
- № 3919 TSO – Tourist Second Open
- № 13324 FK – First Corridor
- № 21187 BCK – Brake Composite Corridor
- № 34627 BSK – Brake Second Corridor

==== Ex BR Mark 1 Non Passenger Carrying Coaching Stock (NPCCS) ====
- № 84031 NAV/BG – Gangwayed Full Brake
- № 94071 NJV/NMV/GUV – General Utility Van 90 mph

==== Ex BR Mark 2 Coaches ====
- № 5132 TSO – Tourist Second Open “Clan Munro“
- № 5174 TSO – Tourist Second Open
- № 9102 BSOT – Brake Second Open Trolley

==== Locomotive Hauled Mark 3a Coaches ====
- № 10412 TSOB – Tourist Standard Open Buffet

=== Wagons ===
==== Ex GWR Wagons ====
- № W94845 GWR Open “C” Tube Wagon

==== Ex LMS Wagons ====
- № M499227 LMS Tube Wagon

==== Ex LNER Wagons ====
- № DE260861 Lowmac EP Well Wagon

==== Ex BR Wagons ====
- № 113008 ODA Open Wagon
- № 200026 VAA 45t GLW Closed Van
- № LDB900419 40t Bogie Flatrol
- № B900914 25t Bogie Weltrol
- № B935493 22t Plate Wagon
- № B942667 42t Bogie Bolster D
- № B951805 Standard BR 20t Brake Van
- № B952510 Standard BR 20t Brake Van
- № DB992300 ZMV ‘Mackerel’ 17t Ballast Hopper
- № DB993270 ZFV ‘Dogfish’ 24t Ballast Hopper
- № DB993399 ZFV ‘Dogfish’ 24t Ballast Hopper
- № DB996995 ‘Salmon’ 51t Bogie Rail Wagon

=== Steam-powered Crane ===
- № 12394 Smith Rodley Steam Crane

== Gallery ==
The booking office and platform at Pitsford and Brampton

The platform at Pitsford and Brampton Station

Pitsford and Brampton signal box

Pitsford Sidings signal box

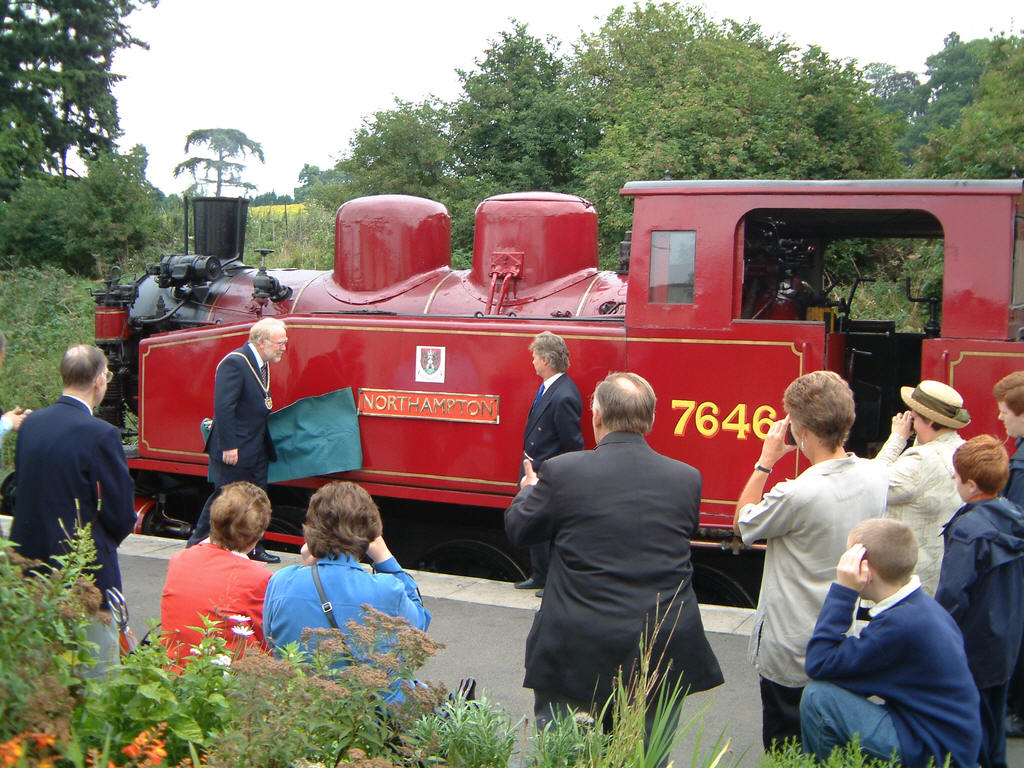
Steam locomotive 7646 "Northampton" officially named by the Mayor of Northampton

Peckett 0-4-0ST Works No. 2104 in the yard, preparing for a day's use on passenger trains

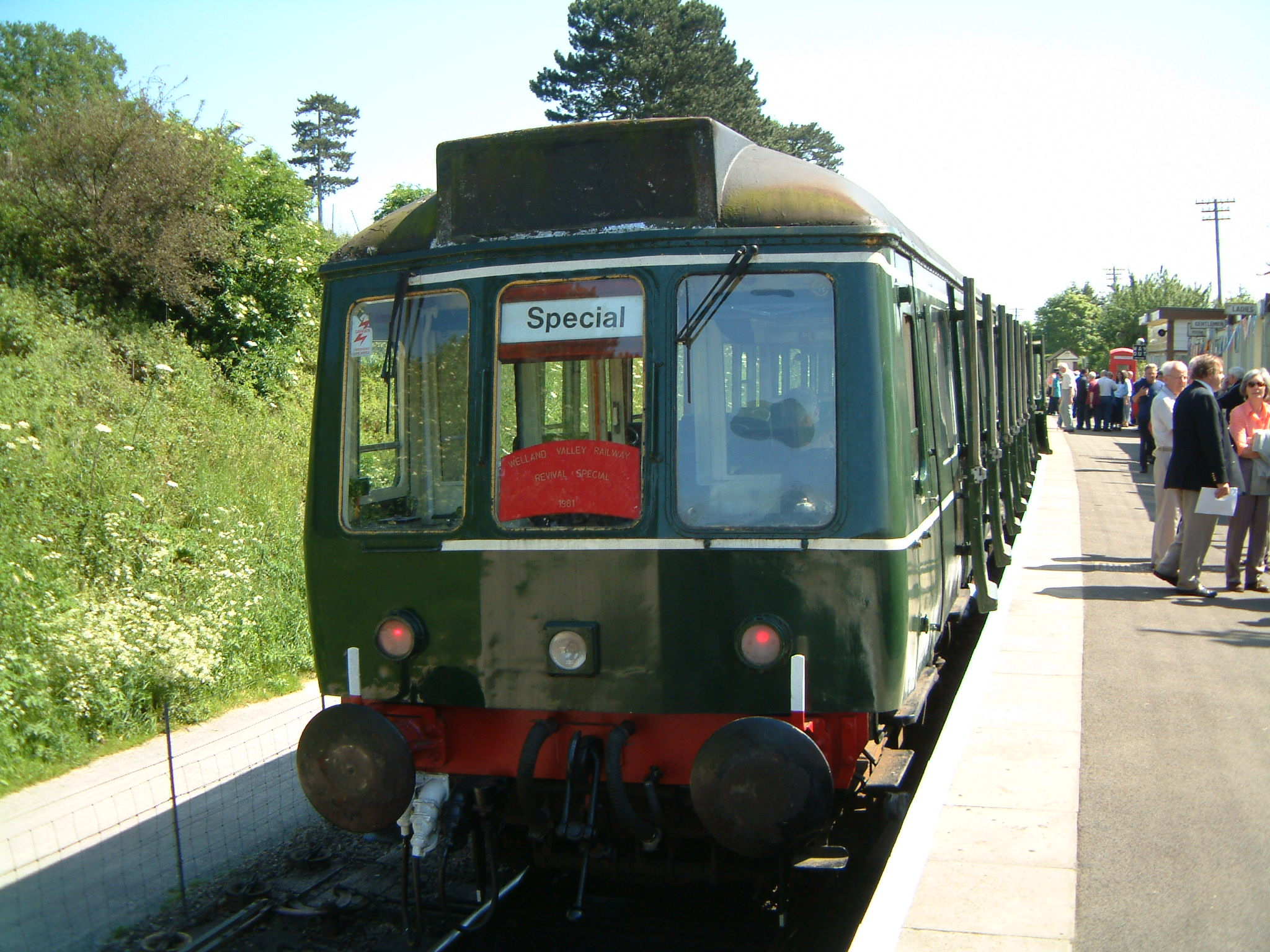
The first passenger train to cross Bridge 13, with headboard from 1981 (Class 117 51402 has since moved to the Strathspey Railway)

Boughton — end of the Brampton Valley Way which runs alongside the railway

JCB excavator used in the railway's construction

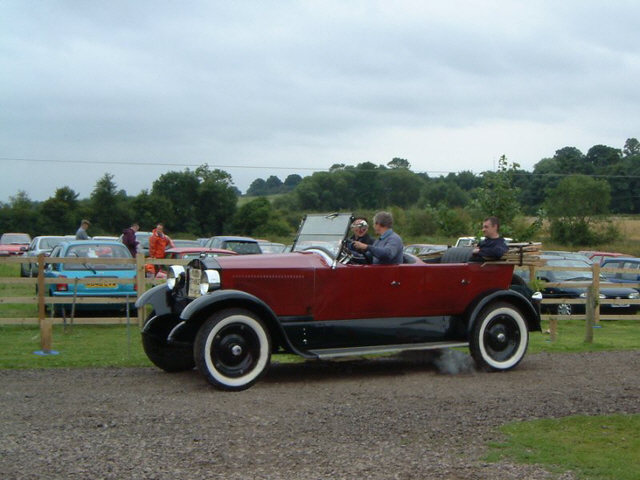
Stanley Steamer visiting an event at the railway

Hunslet 0-6-0ST 'Ring Haw' and a short goods train

Santa Special hauled by No. 7646
