= Daventry District Council elections =

Local government elections in Northamptonshire, England

One third of Daventry District Council in Northamptonshire, England was elected each year, followed by one year when there was an election to Northamptonshire County Council instead. Since the last boundary changes in 1999, 38 councillors were elected from 24 wards. In another boundary review in 2012 the councillors were reduced to 36 councillors across 16 wards. The council was abolished in 2021, with the area becoming part of West Northamptonshire.

== Political control ==
The first election was held in 1973. The council then acted as a shadow authority alongside the outgoing authorities until 1 April 1974 when it formally came into being. From 1974 until its abolition in 2021, political control of the council was as follows:

Party in control	Years
No overall control	1974–1976
Conservative	1976–1980
No overall control	1980–1983
Conservative	1983–1995
No overall control	1995–1999
Conservative	1999–2021

=== Leadership ===
The leaders of the council from 1999 until the council's abolition in 2021 were:

Councillor	Party	From	To
Chris Millar	Conservative	Aug 1999	31 Oct 2019
Richard Auger	Conservative	1 Nov 2019	31 Mar 2021

== Council elections ==
- 1973 Daventry District Council election
- 1976 Daventry District Council election
- 1979 Daventry District Council election (New ward boundaries)
- 1980 Daventry District Council election
- 1982 Daventry District Council election
- 1983 Daventry District Council election
- 1984 Daventry District Council election
- 1986 Daventry District Council election
- 1987 Daventry District Council election
- 1988 Daventry District Council election (District boundary changes took place but the number of seats remained the same)
- 1990 Daventry District Council election
- 1991 Daventry District Council election
- 1992 Daventry District Council election
- 1994 Daventry District Council election
- 1995 Daventry District Council election
- 1996 Daventry District Council election
- 1998 Daventry District Council election
- 1999 Daventry District Council election (New ward boundaries)
- 2000 Daventry District Council election
- 2002 Daventry District Council election
- 2003 Daventry District Council election
- 2004 Daventry District Council election
- 2006 Daventry District Council election
- 2007 Daventry District Council election
- 2008 Daventry District Council election
- 2010 Daventry District Council election
- 2011 Daventry District Council election
- 2012 Daventry District Council election (New ward boundaries)
- 2014 Daventry District Council election
- 2015 Daventry District Council election
- 2016 Daventry District Council election
- 2018 Daventry District Council election

== Results maps ==
2002 results map

2003 results map

2004 results map

2006 results map

2007 results map

2008 results map

2010 results map

2011 results map

2012 results map

2014 results map

2015 results map

2016 results map

2018 results map

== By-elections ==
=== 1998-2002 ===
Drayton By-Election 7 June 2001
Party	Candidate	Votes	%	±%
Labour		1,540	61.5	
Conservative		966	38.5	
Majority		574	23.0	
Turnout		2,506		
Labour hold		Swing		

Hill By-Election 7 June 2001
Party	Candidate	Votes	%	±%
Labour		1,079	59.4	
Conservative		736	40.6	
Majority		574	18.8	
Turnout		1,815		
Labour hold		Swing		

=== 2002-2006 ===
Drayton By-Election 26 June 2003
Party	Candidate	Votes	%	±%
Conservative	Annette Dunn	332	53.9	+5.7
Labour	Jean Tucker	285	46.2	−5.6
Majority		47	7.7	
Turnout		617	12.8	
Conservative gain from Labour		Swing		

=== 2006-2010 ===
Drayton By-Election 10 September 2009
Party	Candidate	Votes	%	±%
Conservative	Chris Eddon	314	33.9	−11.5
Labour	Wendy Randall	158	17.0	−6.4
Liberal Democrats	John Lathan	138	14.9	+14.9
BNP	David Jones	133	14.3	−17.0
Independent	Steve Tubb	129	13.9	+13.9
Socialist Alternative	Meg Price	55	5.9	+5.9
Majority		156	16.9	
Turnout		927	19.6	
Conservative hold		Swing		

Yelvertoft By-Election 10 September 2009
Party	Candidate	Votes	%	±%
Conservative	Alan Chandler	382	79.7	+10.9
Liberal Democrats	Hermione Ainley	97	20.3	+7.3
Majority		285	59.4	
Turnout		479	33.0	
Conservative hold		Swing		

=== 2010-2014 ===
Conservative councillor Frank Wiig (Brixworth) dies. The seat was held by the Conservatives in a by-election on 15 November 2012.

Brixworth By-election 15 November 2012
Party	Candidate	Votes	%	±%
Conservative	Stephen Pointer	857	63.9	+18.2
Green	Steve Whiffen	484	36.1	+13.5
Majority		373	27.8	
Turnout		1,341		
Conservative hold		Swing		

Conservative councillor Nick Bunting (Brixworth) resigned from the council. The seat was held by the Conservatives in a by-election on 2 May 2013.

Brixworth By-election 2 May 2013
Party	Candidate	Votes	%	±%
Conservative	Ian Barratt	1,082	62.3	+16.6
Labour	Robert McNally	307	17.7	+3.1
Green	Steve Whiffen	258	14.9	−7.7
Liberal Democrats	Neil Farmer	89	5.1	−12.0
Majority		775	44.6	
Turnout		1,736		
Conservative hold		Swing		

Conservative councillor Kay Driver (Welford) resigned from the council. The seat was held by the Conservatives in a by-election on 2 May 2013.

Welford By-election 2 May 2013
Party	Candidate	Votes	%	±%
Conservative	Luke Major	824	66.2	+6.0
Green	Katharine Wicksteed	242	19.5	−2.9
Labour	Sue Myers	178	14.3	−3.1
Majority		582	46.8	
Turnout		1,244		
Conservative hold		Swing		

Conservative councillor Ken Melling (Ravensthorpe) dies. The seat was held by the Conservatives in a by-election on 5 September 2013.

Ravensthorpe By-election 5 September 2013
Party	Candidate	Votes	%	±%
Conservative	Bryn Aldridge	285	46.5	−15.3
UKIP	Eric MacAnndrais	212	34.6	+34.6
Labour	Sue Myers	93	15.2	+15.2
Liberal Democrats	Neil Farmer	23	3.8	−14.4
Majority		73	11.9	
Turnout		613		
Conservative hold		Swing		

=== 2014-2018 ===
Conservative councillor Diana Osborne (Long Buckby) resigned from the council in March 2017. The seat was held by the Conservatives in a by-election on 4 May. New councillor Malcolm Robert Longley's term ends in 2019.

Long Buckby by-election, 4 May 2017 Term ends 2 May 2019
Party	Candidate	Votes	%	±%
Conservative	Malcolm Robert Longley	1,170	50.6	−3.5
Labour	Sue Myers	565	24.4	−0.7
Liberal Democrats	Neil Arthur Crispin Farmer	232	10.0	+10.0
Green	Tom Alexander Forrest Harper	169	7.3	+7.3
UKIP	Ian Robert James Dexter	151	6.5	−13.5
Majority		605	26.2	−2.8
Turnout		2312	43.81	−29.60
Conservative hold		Swing		

Conservative councillor Ann Carter (Walgrave) resigned from the council in March 2018. The seat was contested in a by-election on 3 May. There are elections due in most other wards in Daventry on the same day.

Walgrave by-election, 3 May 2018 Term ends 2 May 2019
Party	Candidate	Votes	%	±%
Conservative	Lesley Woolnough	431	68.85	+9.7%
Liberal Democrats	Grant Bowles	195	31.15	+31.15%
Majority		236	37.7	
Turnout		626	38.27	
Conservative hold		Swing	-11%	

=== 2018-2021 ===
Conservative councillor Fabienne Fraser-Allen (Brixworth) was forced to resign from the council due to non-attendance in June 2019. The seat was contested in a by-election on 18 July 2019 . The term was due to end in 2020 but was extended one year due to the creation of a new West Northamptonshire Authority .

Brixworth by-election, 18th July 2019 Term ends 7 May 2020
Party	Candidate	Votes	%	±%
Liberal Democrats	Jonathan Harris	817	49.5	38.5%
Conservative	Lauren Harrington-Carter	615	37.3	−27.8%
Labour	Stuart Coe	218	13.2	−10.7%
Majority		202	12.2	
Turnout		1663	30	−2.7%
Liberal Democrats gain from Conservative		Swing	33%	

Labour councillor Aiden Ramsey resigned as he moved away from the area after being elected in 2018. The seat was contested in a by-election on 24 October 2019 . The term was due to end in 2022 but ended in 2021 due to the creation of a new West Northamptonshire Council.

Abbey North by-election, 24th October 2019 Term ends 5th May 2022
Party	Candidate	Votes	%	±%
Conservative	Lauren Harrington-Carter	371	40.4	15.0%
Liberal Democrats	Alan Knape	282	30.7	11.3%
Labour	Emily Carter	265	28.9	−14.7%
Majority		89	9.7	
Turnout		930	17.5	−10.5%
Conservative gain from Labour		Swing	14.9%	
