= Ken Ritchie =

British psephologist (born 1946)

Kenneth George Hutchison Ritchie (born 8 December 1946) is a British psephologist and former Labour and Co-operative councillor. He was the chief executive of the Electoral Reform Society from 1997 until 26 June 2010, and a member of the board from 2012 to 2019.

== Early life and education ==
Kenneth Ritchie was the son of the late William Ritchie and Margaret Morton Ritchie (née Hutchison). He attended George Heriot's School in Edinburgh.

Ritchie graduated from the University of Edinburgh with a BSc in mathematics, and then spent 18 months teaching maths in Tanzania with Voluntary Service Overseas during 1968 and 1969. After that, he returned to Britain to work as a systems analyst for Imperial Chemical Industries, where he worked from 1970 to 1973. His African interests led him to complete a PhD on Aston University's Interdisciplinary Higher Degrees Scheme (IHD). This focused on the policies and decision-making methods of voluntary organisations, particularly in East Africa. He was awarded his PhD in 1981.

== Career ==
In 1976, Ritchie became head of International Service for the UK United Nations Association, a role he held until 1983. From 1983 to 1988, Ritchie was executive director of Appropriate Health Resources & Technologies Action Group, and deputy director of the British Refugee Council from 1988 to 1994. Ritchie subsequently became UK Director of the Intermediate Technology Development Group, a role he held from 1994 to 1996.

One of Ritchie's main interests has been the cause of electoral reform. It has been suggested that he became a convert to this as a result of standing for Labour in constituencies described as "hopelessly unwinnable" by FairVote. He was the chief executive of the Electoral Reform Society from 1997 until 2010, and in this capacity, he authored an article voicing his opposition to First Past the Post in The Independent just prior to the 2010 general election. He was also a member of the ERS board from 2012 to 2019.

Whilst at the ERS, Ritchie also served with other organisations which promoted electoral reform: from 1998 until 2010, he was a director of Make Votes Count, and from 2004 to 2010, he was a board member of FairVote (also known as the Center for Voting and Democracy), a Washington-based group. Ritchie has been part of the executive committee for the Labour Campaign for Electoral Reform since 2010. As of 2022, he is their treasurer.

== Campaigning activities ==
From 1980 to 1985, Ritchie was the honorary treasurer of War on Want. In 1984, he became treasurer of the Western Sahara Campaign, a role he continues to hold. Ritchie was a member of the Council for the Advancement of Arab-British Understanding from 1989 to 1984. Ritchie served as the chairperson of the London Friends of Palestine in 1987. He has also been a board member of Oxfam UK.

In recent years, Ritchie has championed republicanism in the UK. He was a member of the executive committee for Republic from 2011 to 2019, and in 2011, he founded Labour for a Republic, a Labour-affiliated group campaigning for Britain to become a republic. Since 2014, he has been LfaR's secretary.

Ritchie was on the executive committee of the Reform Foundation as its chairman from 2011 to 2018. In 2011, he also served as co-ordinator of the All-Party Parliamentary Human Rights Group.

== Electoral politics ==
Ritchie joined the Labour Party in 1978, and has stood as a parliamentary candidate for the party three times. He was also chair of Beckenham Constituency Labour Party in London from 1987 to 1993. At the 1987 and 1992 general elections, Ritchie unsuccessfully contested the seat. In 1987, he came third, but improved on this in 1992 by coming second. Ritchie also stood for election to the London Borough of Bromley in 1990. As one of the two Labour candidates for Lawrie Park and Kent House, a ward in the Beckenham constituency, Ritchie was the top placed opposition candidate behind the Conservatives, who held both the seats.

At the next general election, in 1997, Ritchie contested Daventry in Northamptonshire. Under Labour's landslide election victory, led by Tony Blair, there was an 11.1% swing to the party in the seat, with Ritchie again taking second place, albeit by the narrowest majority since the constituency's 1974 recreation. The parliamentary constituencies Ritchie contested have generally been safe seats for the incumbent Conservative Party.

Ritchie stood in the Badby ward for the 2003 Daventry District Council elections, coming a distant second to the Conservatives. In March 2012, he was named as one of the two potential Labour candidates who would run to be the first Northamptonshire Police and Crime Commissioner. However, his rival, Lee Barron, was ultimately selected, and the Conservative candidate won the ensuing contest. In May that year, Ritchie was a Labour candidate for Daventry District Council in Abbey North ward in the local elections, but was unsuccessful.

The following year, he was a candidate in Daventry East division on Northamptonshire County Council, but came third. In the 2014 and 2015 Daventry elections, he unsuccessfully stood in Drayton, coming second. Ritchie again contested Abbey North in 2016, and was elected, gaining one of the ward's seats from the Conservatives. He also contested Northamptonshire's Braunston and Crick division in 2017. He represented Abbey North as a Labour and Co-operative councillor until 2021: upon the formation of the new West Northamptonshire local authority, Ritchie was an unsuccessful candidate for Daventry West at their inaugural elections in 2021.

== Personal life ==
In 1985, Ritchie married Elizabeth Anne Black. The couple have a son and daughter. Ritchie lists his recreations as golf, music and walking the dog.

In 2006, he became a Fellow of the Royal Society of Arts.

== Publications ==
- Don't Take No for an Answer: the 2011 referendum and the future of electoral reform (2011, with Lewis Baston)
- Electoral Systems (2012, contributor)
- Fixing our Broken Democracy: the case for total representation (2012)
- The Saharawi Struggle for Self-Determination: a history of the campaign in Britain (2014)
- Total Representation: an electoral system to resolve Italy's democratic crisis (2014)
- The Elephant in the House (2015)
- The Reform Debates: an agenda for a better democracy (2016)
