= 2016 Daventry District Council election =

2016 UK local government election

← 2015	5 May 2016	2018 →

Results of the 2016 Daventry District Council election

The 2016 Daventry District Council election took place on 5 May 2016 to elect members of Daventry District Council in England. This was on the same day as other local elections.

Only one seat changed hands with Labour taking one seat from the Conservatives leading to the council being made up as follows; 30 Conservative councillors, 3 Labour councillors, 2 UKIP councillors and 1 Liberal Democrat councillor.

This was the first year in which the Liberal Democrats, along with the Conservatives and Labour Party, stood in all 12 wards.

== Election result ==
Daventry local election result 2016
Party	Seats	Gains	Losses	Net gain/loss	Seats %	Votes %	Votes	+/−
Labour	3	1	0	1	25%	28.1%	4,912	
Liberal Democrats	1	0	0	0	8.3%	14.1%	2,467	
Conservative	8	0	1	-1	66.7%	49.9%	8,725	
UKIP	0	0	0	0	0%	5.8%	1,018	
Green	0	0	0	0	0%	1.0%	176	
Independent	0	0	0	0	0%	1.1%	201	

== Ward results ==
=== Abbey North ===
Abbey North 2016
Party	Candidate	Votes	%	±%
Labour	Ken Ritchie	510	37.6	
Conservative	Chris Long	484	35.6	
UKIP	Eric MacAnndrais	300	22.1	
Liberal Democrats	John Henry Butlin	64	4.7	
Majority		26	2.0	
Turnout		1367	26.42	
Labour gain from Conservative		Swing		

=== Abbey South ===
Abbey South 2016
Party	Candidate	Votes	%	±%
Conservative	Deanna Eddon	779	51.2	
Labour	Aiden Ramsey	625	41.1	
Liberal Democrats	Grant Lee Andrew Bowles	117	7.7	
Majority		154	10.1	
Turnout		1540	32.02	
Conservative hold		Swing		

=== Barby & Kilsby ===
Barby & Kilsby 2016
Party	Candidate	Votes	%	±%
Liberal Democrats	Catherine Elizabeth Evelyn Lomax	1053	63.0	
Conservative	Rob Chamberlain	620	37.0	
Majority		433	26.0	
Turnout		1690	45.95	
Liberal Democrats hold		Swing		

=== Braunston & Welton ===
Braunston & Welton 2016
Party	Candidate	Votes	%	±%
Labour	Jason Pritchard	489	49.3	
Conservative	Tim Wilson	404	40.7	
Liberal Democrats	Andrew Stuart John Simpson	80	12.4	
Majority		85	8.6	
Turnout		991	50.56	
Labour hold		Swing		

=== Brixworth ===
Brixworth 2016
Party	Candidate	Votes	%	±%
Conservative	Fabienne Fraser-Allen	928	51.0	
Labour	Stuart Matthew Coe	317	17.4	
UKIP	Pamela Booker	306	16.8	
Liberal Democrats	Simon Hall	123	6.8	
Green	Stephen John Whiffen	107	5.9	
Majority		611	33.6	
Turnout		1819	34.2	
Conservative hold		Swing		

=== Drayton ===
Drayton 2016
Party	Candidate	Votes	%	±%
Labour	Wendy Randall	848	60.6	
Conservative	Annette Dunn	374	26.7	
Independent	Peter John Scriven	124	8.9	
Liberal Democrats	Inge Nina Freudenreich	43	3.1	
Majority		474	33.9	
Turnout		1400	31.01	
Labour hold		Swing		

=== Hill ===
Hill 2016
Party	Candidate	Votes	%	±%
Conservative	Alan Hills	601	49.3	
Labour	Stephen Dabbs	493	40.4	
Independent	Keith Frank Simpson	77	6.3	
Liberal Democrats	Anthony David Parsons	38	3.1	
Majority		108	8.9	
Turnout		1219	28.55	
Conservative hold		Swing		

=== Long Buckby ===
Long Buckby 2016
Party	Candidate	Votes	%	±%
Conservative	Chris Millar	1070	56.5	
Labour	Chris Myers	555	29.3	
Liberal Democrats	Neil Arthur Crispin Farmer	245	12.9	
Majority		515	27.2	
Turnout		1893	36.78	
Conservative hold		Swing		

=== Ravensthorpe ===
Ravensthorpe 2016
Party	Candidate	Votes	%	±%
Conservative	Richard Micklewright	463	57.3	−2.4
Liberal Democrats	Michael Ian Cobbe	225	28.1	+10.5
Labour	Sue Myers	108	13.5	+13.5
Majority		238	29.7	−10.6
Turnout		802	41.84	+4.66
Conservative hold		Swing		

=== Spratton ===
Spratton 2016
Party	Candidate	Votes	%	±%
Conservative	John Shephard	808	64.7	
Labour	Ruaraidh McDonald-Walker	238	19.1	
Liberal Democrats	Rupert Moscrop Knowles	125	10.0	
Green	Janine Rachael Spence	69	5.5	
Majority		570	45.6	
Turnout		1249	36.74	
Conservative hold		Swing		

=== Weedon ===
Weedon 2016
Party	Candidate	Votes	%	±%
Conservative	Adam Brown	1276	64.9	
Labour	Callum Batchelor	419	21.3	
Liberal Democrats	Christopher Robin Salaman	227	11.6	
Majority		857	43.6	
Turnout		1965	39.07	
Conservative hold		Swing		

=== Woodford ===
Woodford 2016
Party	Candidate	Votes	%	±%
Conservative	Liz Griffin	918	51.7	
UKIP	Gary John Denby	412	23.2	
Labour	Elizabeth Anne Ritchie	310	17.5	
Liberal Democrats	Simon Harold Lytton	127	7.2	
Majority		506	28.5	
Turnout		1775	33.39	
Conservative hold		Swing		
