= Northampton Golf Club =

Coordinates: 52°16′29″N 0°58′45″W

Northampton Golf Club is a golf club and course in Harlestone, to the northwest of Northampton and immediately to the southeast of Althorp, in Northamptonshire, England. The club was established on 1 July 1893. Three of the holes, the 16th to the 18th, are set around Harlestone Lake.
