= LSVT =

LSVT may refer to:

- Lee Silverman Voice Treatment for speech disorders
- A Large Scale Voluntary Transfer of housing stock ownership in the United Kingdom
