= 1999 Daventry District Council election =

1999 UK local government election

← 1998	6 May 1999	2000 →

All 38 seats in Daventry District Council 20 seats needed for a majority

Elections to Daventry District Council were held on 6 May 1999. The whole council was up for election with boundary changes since the last election in 1998 increasing the number of seats by 3. The Conservative party gained overall control of the council from no overall control.

== Election result ==
Daventry local election result 1999
Party	Seats	Gains	Losses	Net gain/loss	Seats %	Votes %	Votes	+/−
Conservative	20			+3	52.6			
Labour	13			0	34.2			
Liberal Democrats	3			0	7.9			
Independent	2			0	5.3			
