= 2008 Daventry District Council election =

2008 UK local government election

← 2007	1 May 2008	2010 →

Results of the 2008 Daventry District Council election

Elections to Daventry District Council in Northamptonshire, England were held on 1 May 2008. One third of the council was up for election and the Conservative Party stayed in overall control of the council.

No seats changed hands at the election with the Conservative Party winning 10 of the 12 seats up for election. The British National Party were pleased with the second place they achieved in Drayton ward feeling they could build on the performance but the other parties were happy that they had been defeated.

After the election, the composition of the council was:

- Conservative 35
- Liberal Democrat 2
- Labour 1

== Election result ==
Daventry local election result 2008
Party	Seats	Gains	Losses	Net gain/loss	Seats %	Votes %	Votes	+/−
Conservative	10	0	0	0	83.3	60.4	6,488	-8.5%
Labour	1	0	0	0	8.3	18.8	2,016	+0.0%
Liberal Democrats	1	0	0	0	8.3	16.6	1,780	+14.0%
BNP	0	0	0	0	0	4.2	451	+4.2%

Two Conservative candidates were unopposed.

== Ward results ==
Abbey North
Party	Candidate	Votes	%	±%
Conservative	Gloria Edwards-Davidson	1,045	62.9	+13.2
Labour	Chris Myers	356	21.4	−4.0
Liberal Democrats	Neil Farmer	261	15.7	−9.3
Majority		689	41.5	+17.2
Turnout		1,662	25.9	
Conservative hold		Swing		

Abbey South
Party	Candidate	Votes	%	±%
Conservative	Deanna Eddon	686	68.1	+15.7
Labour	Maureen Luke	197	19.6	−0.9
Liberal Democrats	John Lathan	124	12.3	+12.3
Majority		489	48.5	+23.2
Turnout		1,007	35.4	
Conservative hold		Swing		

Barby & Kilsby
Party	Candidate	Votes	%	±%
Liberal Democrats	Catherine Lomax	793	54.4	+2.6
Conservative	John Richards	666	45.6	−2.6
Majority		127	8.8	+5.2
Turnout		1,459	53.9	
Liberal Democrats hold		Swing		

Boughton and Pitsford
Party	Candidate	Votes	%	±%
Conservative	John Shephard	Unopposed		
Conservative hold		Swing		

Braunston
Party	Candidate	Votes	%	±%
Labour	Janet McCarthy	447	60.3	−11.7
Conservative	Ian Nott	294	39.7	+11.7
Majority		153	20.6	−23.4
Turnout		741	51.8	
Labour hold		Swing		

Brixworth
Party	Candidate	Votes	%	±%
Conservative	Frank Wiig	Unopposed		
Conservative hold		Swing		

Drayton
Party	Candidate	Votes	%	±%
Conservative	Annette Dunn	654	45.4	−10.9
BNP	David Jones	451	31.3	+31.3
Labour	Peter Luke	337	23.4	−20.3
Majority		203	14.1	+1.5
Turnout		1,442	30.8	
Conservative hold		Swing		

Flore
Party	Candidate	Votes	%	±%
Conservative	Wendy Amos	553	78.4	+1.5
Labour	Beatrice Price	98	13.9	−9.2
Liberal Democrats	Liz Pym	54	7.7	+7.7
Majority		455	64.5	+10.7
Turnout		705	46.0	
Conservative hold		Swing		

Hill
Party	Candidate	Votes	%	±%
Conservative	Thelma Hills	751	70.8	+23.8
Labour	Nigel Carr	310	29.2	+7.2
Majority		441	41.6	+25.6
Turnout		1,061	25.9	
Conservative hold		Swing		

Ravensthorpe
Party	Candidate	Votes	%	±%
Conservative	Ian Pasley-Tyler	535	74.2	−5.0
Liberal Democrats	Bob Pratchett	123	17.1	+17.1
Labour	Sue Myers	63	8.7	−12.1
Majority		412	57.1	−1.3
Turnout		721	49.8	
Conservative hold		Swing		

Weedon
Party	Candidate	Votes	%	±%
Conservative	David White	679	70.1	−4.8
Liberal Democrats	Chris Salaman	289	29.9	+17.2
Majority		390	40.2	−22.0
Turnout		968	37.4	
Conservative hold		Swing		

Woodford
Party	Candidate	Votes	%	±%
Conservative	David Griffin	625	64.5	
Labour	Hilary Bradley	208	21.5	
Liberal Democrats	Malcolm Adcock	136	14.0	
Majority		417	43.0	
Turnout		969	34.0	
Conservative hold		Swing		
