= 2004 Daventry District Council election =

2004 UK local government election

← 2003	10 June 2004	2006 →

Results of the 2004 Daventry District Council election

Elections to Daventry District Council were held on 10 June 2004. One third of the council was up for election and the Conservative Party stayed in overall control of the council.

After the election, the composition of the council was:

- Conservative 34
- Labour 3
- Liberal Democrat 1

== Election result ==
Daventry local election result 2004
Party	Seats	Gains	Losses	Net gain/loss	Seats %	Votes %	Votes	+/−
Conservative	10			0	83.3	62.9	9,619	-1.5%
Labour	1			-1	8.3	28.2	4,316	+1.2%
Liberal Democrats	1			+1	8.3	8.9	1,361	+2.0%

== Ward results ==
Abbey North
Party	Candidate	Votes	%	±%
Conservative	Gloria Edwards-Davidson	1,199	60.7	+1.6
Labour	Olwen Loud	775	39.3	−1.6
Majority		424	21.4	+3.2
Turnout		1,974		

Abbey South
Party	Candidate	Votes	%	±%
Conservative	Graham Morrott	846	67.2	−5.6
Labour	Gareth Pritchard	413	32.8	+5.6
Majority		433	34.4	−11.2
Turnout		1,259		
Conservative hold		Swing		

Barby & Kilsby
Party	Candidate	Votes	%	±%
Liberal Democrats	Catherine Lomax	799	54.5	+11.2
Conservative	John Richards	668	45.5	+0.5
Majority		131	9.0	
Turnout		1,467		

Boughton & Pitsford
Party	Candidate	Votes	%	±%
Conservative	John Shephard	522	79.3	
Labour	Emma Poole	136	20.7	
Majority		386	58.6	
Turnout		658		
Conservative hold		Swing		

Braunston
Party	Candidate	Votes	%	±%
Labour	Janet McCarthy	526	72.0	
Conservative	Lesley Bowles	205	28.0	
Majority		321	44.0	
Turnout		731		
Labour hold		Swing		

Brixworth
Party	Candidate	Votes	%	±%
Conservative	Norman Wiig	1,333	62.3	+9.9
Liberal Democrats	Frances Peacock	562	26.3	+2.8
Labour	Maughan Johnson	244	11.4	+1.4
Majority		771	36.0	+7.1
Turnout		2,139		
Conservative hold		Swing		

Drayton
Party	Candidate	Votes	%	±%
Conservative	Annette Dunn	989	59.2	+11.0
Labour	Brian Roberts	682	40.8	−11.0
Majority		307	18.4	+14.8
Turnout		1,671		
Conservative hold		Swing		

Flore
Party	Candidate	Votes	%	±%
Conservative	Wendy Amos	622	76.9	
Labour	Maureen Luke	187	23.1	
Majority		435	53.8	
Turnout		809		
Conservative hold		Swing		

Hill
Party	Candidate	Votes	%	±%
Conservative	Robert Walduck	993	67.0	
Labour	David Nicoll	488	33.0	
Majority		505	34.0	
Turnout		1,481		
Conservative hold		Swing		

Ravensthorpe
Party	Candidate	Votes	%	±%
Conservative	Ian Pasley-Tyler	636	79.2	
Labour	Christopher Myers	167	20.8	
Majority		469	58.4	
Turnout		803		
Conservative hold		Swing		

Weedon
Party	Candidate	Votes	%	±%
Conservative	David White	871	73.8	−9.5
Labour	Thomas Price	309	26.2	+9.5
Majority		562	47.6	−19.0
Turnout		1,180		

Woodford
Party	Candidate	Votes	%	±%
Conservative	David Griffin	735	65.4	+2.3
Labour	Christine Fitchett	389	34.6	−2.3
Majority		346	30.8	+4.6
Turnout		1,124		
Conservative hold		Swing		
