= Chapel Brampton =

Village in Northamptonshire, England

Coordinates: 52.2976°N 0.9417°W

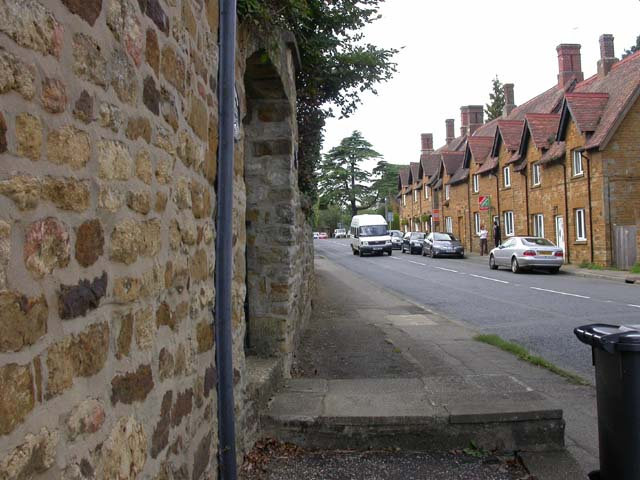
- Welford Road, Chapel Brampton

- Location within Northamptonshire
- Population: 470 (2001 census)
- OS grid reference: SP7267
- Civil parish: Church with Chapel Brampton
- Unitary authority: West Northamptonshire
- Ceremonial county: Northamptonshire
- Region: East Midlands
- Country: England
- Sovereign state: United Kingdom
- Post town: Northampton
- Postcode district: NN6
- Dialling code: 01604
- Police: Northamptonshire
- Fire: Northamptonshire
- Ambulance: East Midlands
- UK Parliament: Daventry

Chapel Brampton is a village and former civil parish now in the parish of Church with Chapel Brampton, in the West Northamptonshire district, in the ceremonial county of Northamptonshire, England. Together with nearby Church Brampton, it is known as The Bramptons. At the time of the 2001 census, Chapel Brampton parish's population was 470 people. On 1 April 2009 the parish was abolished and merged with Church Brampton to form "Church with Chapel Brampton".

== Village ==
The villages name means 'Broom farm/settlement'.

The village is notable for its distinctive Spencer Estate cottages. These Victorian sandstone cottages are of a similar design to cottages found in the nearby villages of Church Brampton, Harlestone and The Bringtons.

Chapel Brampton has three pubs — the Spencer Arms is a former coaching inn whilst the Brampton Halt was part of the railway station. A new build on the site of the former Boughton cold store is named The Windhover after an old name for the kestrel. This site is actually within the parish of Boughton. The village has two conference centres: Sedgebrook Hall and Brampton Grange. Sedgebrook Grange was designed by architect John Brown and built in 1930 as a wedding gift for a member of the Houison Craufurd family from Craufurdland Castle in Ayrshire.

The (Red) Earl Spencer broke the neck of his favourite horse, Merry Tom, whilst out fox hunting and trying to jump the narrow River Nene. The Earl paid for a monument to be erected at the Brixworth end of what is now known as Merry Tom Lane, engraved 'Here Lies the body of Merry Tom'. A local wag scratched on it: "ridden to death by careless John". Merry Tom Lane was also the site of a level crossing. When the railway is rebuilt a small halt will be built there.

=== Preserved railway ===
The nearby railway line is now part of the preserved Northampton & Lamport Railway which has its headquarters at Pitsford and Brampton railway station.
