= 1998 Daventry District Council election =

1998 UK local government election

← 1996	7 May 1998	1999 →

Elections to Daventry District Council were held on 7 May 1998. One third of the council was up for election and the council stayed under no overall control.

After the election, the composition of the council was

- Conservative 17
- Labour 13
- Liberal Democrat 3
- Independent 2

== Election result ==
Daventry local election result 1998
Party	Seats	Gains	Losses	Net gain/loss	Seats %	Votes %	Votes	+/−
Conservative	7			+2	50.0			
Labour	4			-2	28.6			
Liberal Democrats	2			+1	14.3			
Independent	1			-1	7.1			
