= George Seddon (cabinetmaker) =

English cabinetmaker

George Seddon (1727–1801) was an English cabinetmaker. At one time his furniture making business was the largest and most successful in London, employing over four hundred craftsmen. He was Master of the Joiners Company of London in 1795.

His two sons, George and Thomas, and his son in law, Thomas Shackleton joined him in his business.
