= 2015 Daventry District Council election =

2015 UK local government election

← 2014	7 May 2015	2016 →

All 36 seats in the Daventry District Council 19 seats needed for a majority
	First party	Second party
Party	Conservative	Labour
Last election	29	4
Seats won	31	2
Seat change	▲2	▼2
	Third party	Fourth party
Party	UKIP	Liberal Democrats (UK)
Last election	2	1
Seats won	2	1
Seat change	Steady	Steady
- Results of the 2015 Daventry District Council election
Council control before election
Conservative
Council control after election
Conservative

The 2015 Daventry District Council election took place on 7 May 2015 to elect members of Daventry District Council in England. This was on the same day as other local elections. Two seats changed hands with the Conservatives taking both from Labour leading to the council being made up as follows; 31 Conservative councillors, 2 Labour councillors, 2 UKIP councillors and 1 Liberal Democrat councillor.

== Election result ==
Daventry local election result 2015
Party	Seats	Gains	Losses	Net gain/loss	Seats %	Votes %	Votes	+/−
Conservative	12	2	0	+2	100.0	56.0	19,777	
Labour	0	0	2	-2	0.0	22.3	7,889	
UKIP	0	0	0	0	0.0	12.8	4,530	
Green	0	0	0	0	0.0	4.1	1,445	
Liberal Democrats	0	0	0	0	0.0	3.5	1,244	
Independent	0	0	0	0	0.0	1.3	450	

== Ward results ==
=== Abbey North ===
Abbey North 2015
Party	Candidate	Votes	%	±%
Conservative	David Thomas James	1299	44.1	
Labour	Maureen Luke	871	29.6	
UKIP	Peter John Scriven	757	25.7	
Majority		542	14.5	
Turnout		2943	55.35	
Conservative gain from Labour		Swing		

=== Abbey South ===
Abbey South 2015
Party	Candidate	Votes	%	±%
Conservative	Mark David Andrew Wesley	1505	50.0	
Labour	Richard Williams	762	25.3	
UKIP	Jennifer Mary Leighton	722	24.7	
Majority		743	24.7	
Turnout		3007	60.72	
Conservative hold		Swing		

=== Barby & Kilsby ===
Barby & Kilsby 2015
Party	Candidate	Votes	%	±%
Conservative	Ian Bradley Robertson	1440	52.0	
Liberal Democrats	Brian Martin Lomax	845	31.7	
Labour	Elizabeth Anne Ritchie	450	16.3	
Majority		595	20.3	
Turnout		2769	75.61	
Conservative hold		Swing		

=== Brixworth ===
Brixworth 2015
Party	Candidate	Votes	%	±%
Conservative	Nicholas John Bunting	2601	67.2	
Labour	Robert Peter McNally	726	18.8	
Green	Stephen John Whiffen	517	13.4	
Majority		1875	48.4	
Turnout		3870	72.72	
Conservative hold		Swing		

=== Drayton ===
Drayton 2015
Party	Candidate	Votes	%	±%
Conservative	Amy Howard	1018	36.4	
Labour	Ken Ritchie	885	31.7	
UKIP	Stephen Pointer	609	21.8	
Liberal Democrats	Inge Nina Freudenreich	96	3.4	
Independent	Timothy Eric Wilson	175	6.3	
Majority		133	4.7	
Turnout		2793	61.12	
Conservative hold		Swing		

=== Hill ===
Hill 2015
Party	Candidate	Votes	%	±%
Conservative	Wayne Howard	1233	49.7	
Labour	Michael John Arnold	644	26.0	
UKIP	Eric Macanndrais	589	23.8	
Majority		589	23.7	
Turnout		2479	58.61	
Conservative hold		Swing		

=== Long Buckby ===
Long Buckby 2015
Party	Candidate	Votes	%	±%
Conservative	Diana Osborne	2075	54.1	
Labour	Chris Myers	962	25.1	
UKIP	Ian Robert James Dexter	774	20.2	
Majority		1113	29.0	
Turnout		3838	73.41	
Conservative hold		Swing		

=== Moulton ===
Moulton 2015
Party	Candidate	Votes	%	±%
Conservative	Daniel Cribbin	1623	64.6	
Labour	Mark Anthony Gunther Maryan	497	19.8	
Green	Pamela Booker	367	14.6	
Majority		1126	44.8	
Turnout		2514	70.42	
Conservative hold		Swing		

=== Walgrave ===
Walgrave 2015
Party	Candidate	Votes	%	±%
Conservative	Ann Carter	731	59.1	−10.7
Labour	Peter Luke	145	11.7	−18.1
Green	Stuart Tite	75	6.1	+6.1
Independent	Kevin Simons	275	22.2	+22.2
Majority		456	36.3	−3.7
Turnout		1236	76.58	+41.7
Conservative hold		Swing		

=== Weedon ===
Weedon 2015
Party	Candidate	Votes	%	±%
Conservative	John Amos	2181	57.4	
Labour	Raymond Ogden	619	16.3	
UKIP	John Gale	684	18.0	
Liberal Democrats	Chris Salaman	303	8.0	
Majority		1497	41.1	
Turnout		3800	74.54	
Conservative hold		Swing		

=== Welford ===
Welford 2015
Party	Candidate	Votes	%	±%
Conservative	Richard Auger	1672	64.3	
Labour	Sue Myers	520	20.0	
UKIP	Pamela Booker	395	15.2	
Majority		1152	44.3	
Turnout		2600	78.27	
Conservative hold		Swing		

=== Woodford ===
Woodford 2015
Party	Candidate	Votes	%	±%
Conservative	Joanne Gilford	2399	64.4	
Labour	Emma Marsh	808	21.7	
Green	Nikita Webb	486	13.0	
Majority		1591	42.7	
Turnout		3727	69.12	
Conservative hold		Swing		
