= Sedgebrook Hall, Chapel Brampton =

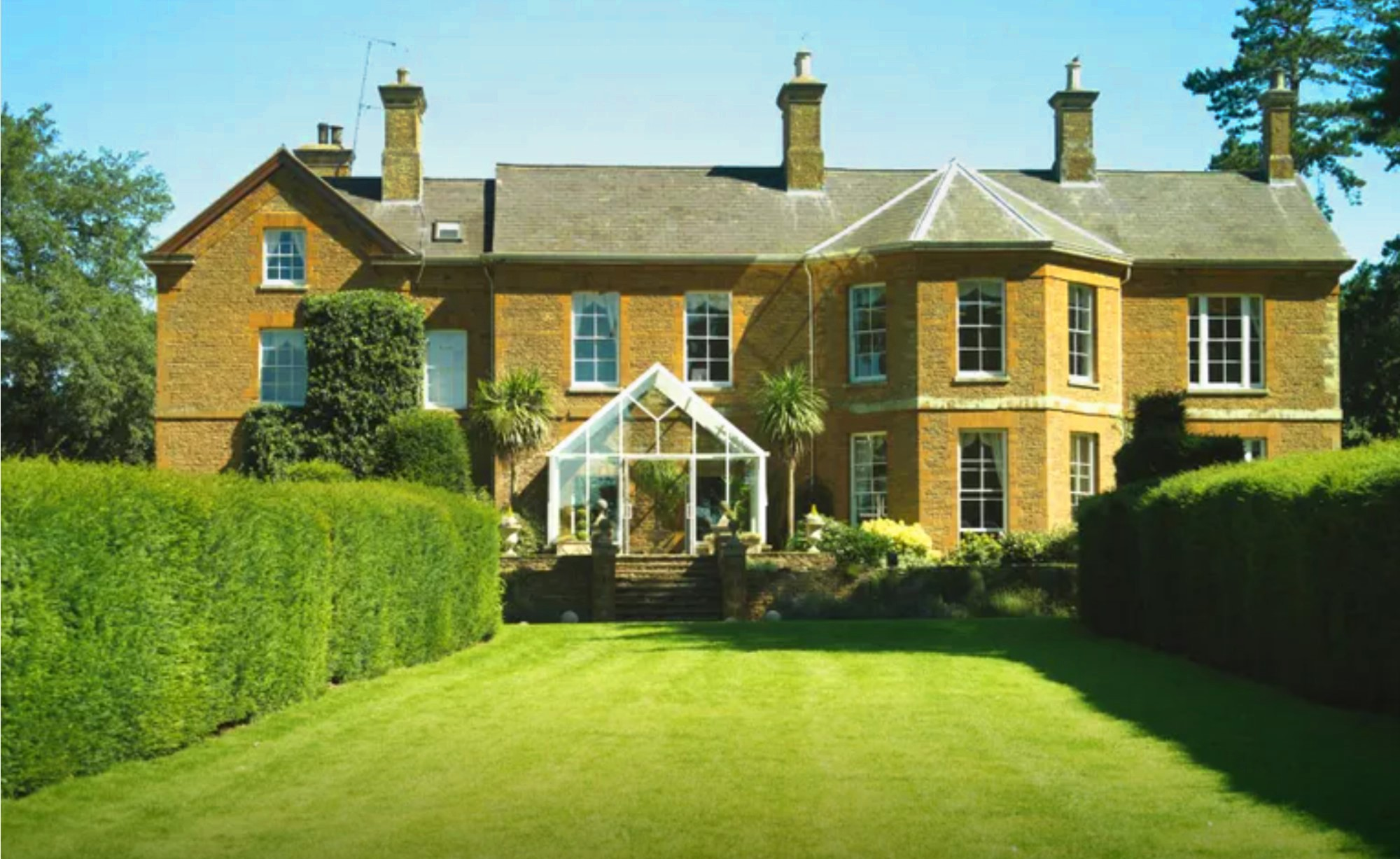
Sedgebrook Hall

Sedgebrook Hall in Chapel Brampton is a building of historical significance. It was built in 1861 by Henry Philip Markham, a prominent citizen of Northampton and was the home of several notable people over the next century. Today it is a hotel which provides accommodation and restaurant facilities and caters for special events particularly weddings.

== Early residents ==
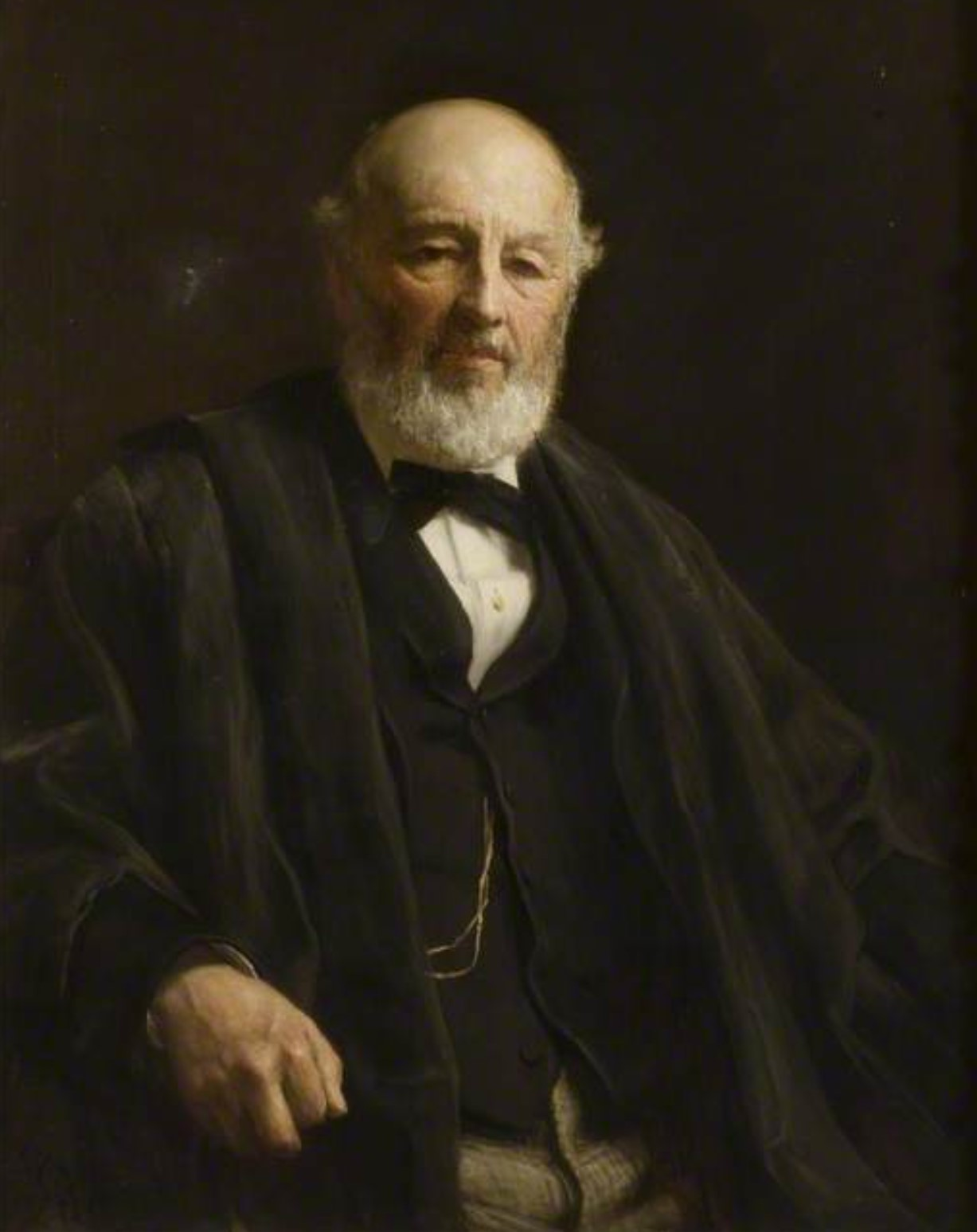
Henry Philip Markham

Henry Philip Markham (1816-1904) built Sedgebrook Hall in 1861. He was an attorney and Mayor of Northampton. His father was Charles Markham, a lawyer in Northampton. In 1855 he married Edith Alexander (1834-1915) who was the daughter of Captain Robert Alexander of her Majesty's 57th Regiment The couple had three children, a son and two daughters. According to his son Christopher Alexander Markham, Henry “built the house of warm-coloured local sand and iron stone and called it Sedgewood.” Christopher also said that in the gable he placed a stone with the initials H. P & E. M. and the date 1861. In the same book Christopher notes that the early ancestors of the Markham family were from Sedgebrook Hall in Lincolnshire. It may be that this was the reason the Pitsford house was so named.

In his role as councillor and mayor of Northampton, Henry did a great deal of work in county affairs. He was a close personal friend of John Spencer, 5th Earl Spencer of Althorp who besides being his neighbour shared his interest in community matters. When Henry died in 1904 the Earl made a touching tribute to him at the funeral. He said.

"(Henry) has been associated with me in important County business for nearly all my life and (it is with) gratitude for his public services and with sorrowful feelings of a long friendship now ended by his death (that I present this wreath)."

After Henry died his wife Edith continued to live at the house until her death in 1915. The property was then sold to John Henry Marlow.

== Later residents ==
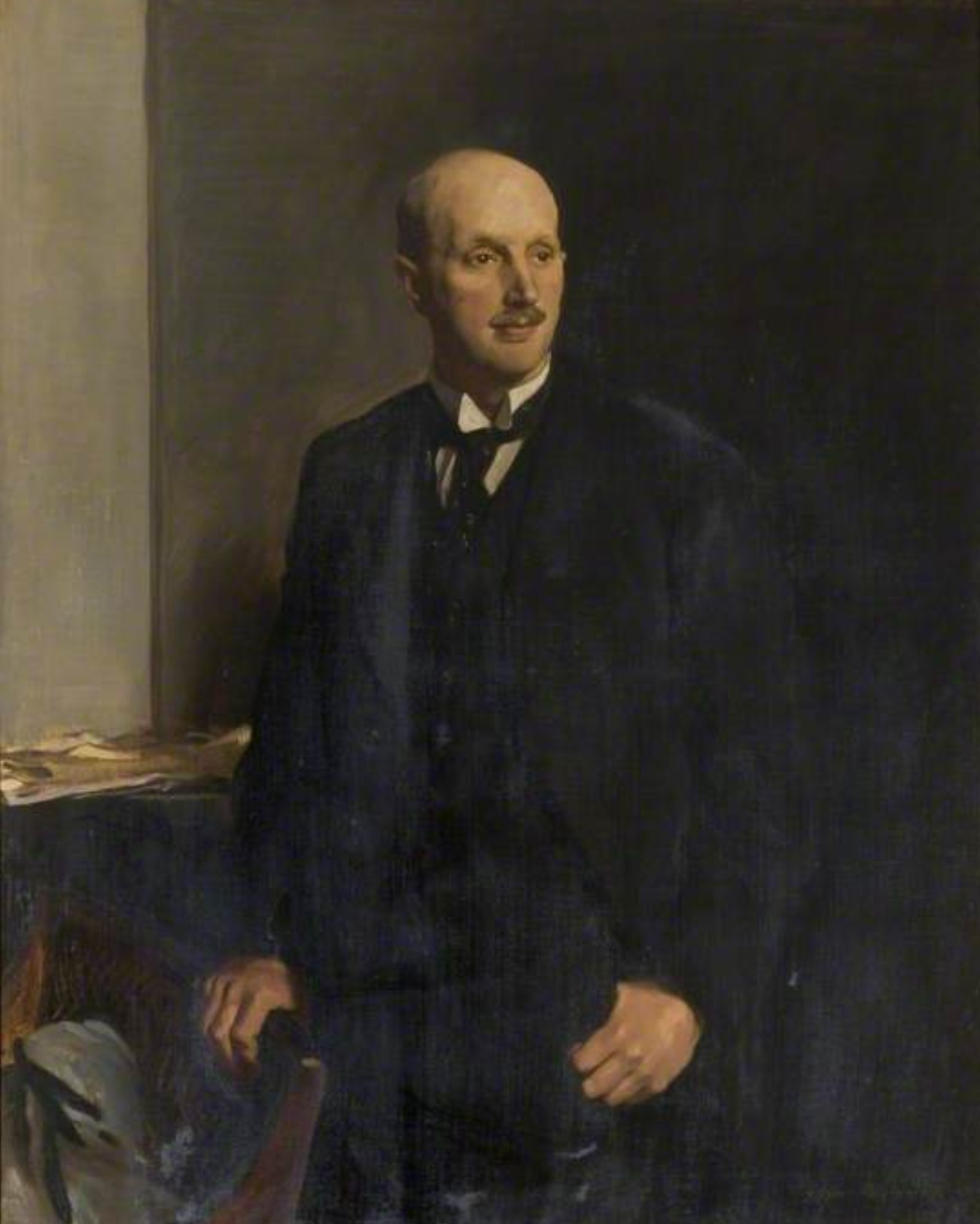
John Henry Marlow

John Henry Marlow (1865-1945) was a very wealthy man who was the head of the shoe manufacturing company John Marlow and sons. He was born in 1865 in Northampton. In 1897 he married Naomi Ellen Bellamy (1870-1961) and the couple had three daughters.

Their second daughter Irene married in 1928 John Douglas Houison-Craufurd (1904-1957) who was heir to Craufurdland Castle in Scotland and Braehead. Their wedding reception was held at Sedgebrook Hall and was widely reported in detail in many newspapers. The magazine “The Sketch” published a photo of the couple walking up the stairs leading from the garden which is shown. The Northampton Mercury described the wedding in the following terms.

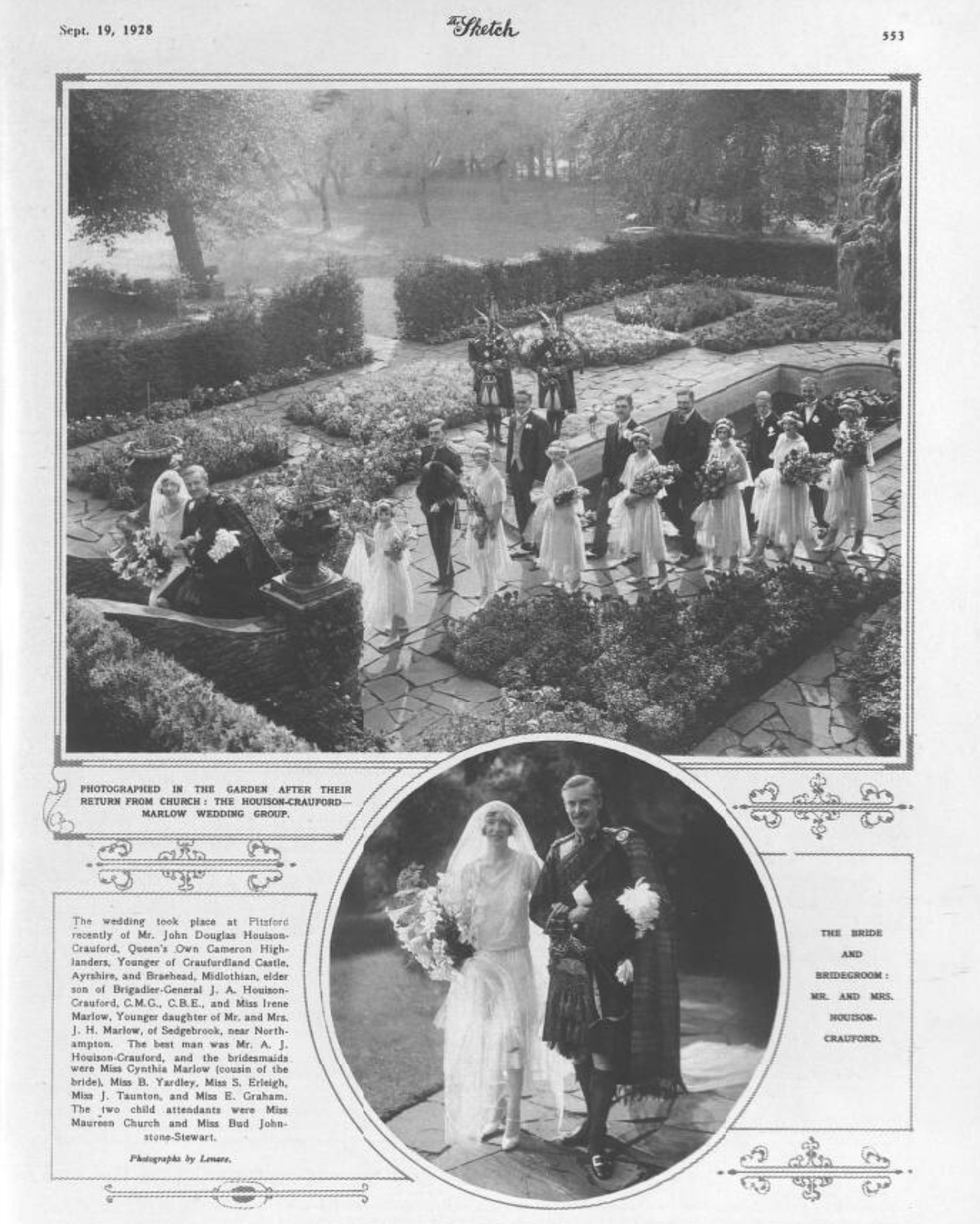
Wedding of Irene Marlow and John Douglas Houison-Craufurd, 1928

"The bride, who was given away by her father looked exquisite in her ivory jewelled dress. The tiny jewels sparkling like dewdrops were hand studded unto the fabric. The skirt was two-tiered in effect and the picot-edged godets which were French-sewn gave it a delightful fullness and dipping effect. The bodice was fairly tight as were the long sleeves. Round the waist was a belt with a clasp of big crystals. The neck was of the new V slanting shape to the right hand side finished with a big bow of tulle. The jewelled head dress had big drop crystal flowers and orange blossom over the ears.

Very original was her sweeping veil and train combined. As she went into church her Brussels net veil hung over her face nearly to the ground and at the back the long train fell gracefully like a peacock’s tail in shape. Her only ornament was a pearl necklace. She carried a sheaf of Harissii lilies tied with a white tulle bow.

The bridegroom wore the full-dress uniform of the highlanders and the bridesmaids wore dainty powder blue chiffon sleeveless dresses. The bodices were tight fitting and the waists were swathed with chiffon and finished with pearl and diamante buckles on the left hip. Their long full skirts were scalloped in big petals giving a charming effect and were slightly longer at the back than in the front. Their flowing capes of chiffon hung to just below the waistline at the back and covered the arms to nearly the elbows and their bandeaux were of chiffon with clusters of blue satin roses and apple green leaves at the sides. They carried sheafs of delphiniums and pink butterfly roses."

As a wedding present to the couple the architect John Brown was commissioned to build Sedgebrook Grange which is located nearby. John Houison-Craufurd, became a Director of his father-in-law's company John Marlow and Sons and later became the head of the firm.

When John Henry Marlow died in 1945 he left Sedgebrook Hall to his wife Naomi. She lived there until her death in 1961. It was then inherited (or bought) by her granddaughter Ann Lindsay Wynyard.

Ann Lindsay Wynyard (1929-2006) (née Cowan) was the daughter of Naomi's child Hylda Dorothea Marlow. In 1950 Ann married Edward James Buckley Wynyard (1918-1991). When Edward died in 1991 Ann moved to a smaller house and sold the Hall. It was then converted into a hotel and Conference Centre.
