= Healthlink Worldwide =

UK-based non-governmental organisation

Healthlink Worldwide, formerly known as Appropriate Health Resources Technologies Action Group (AHRTAG), was founded as a UK-based non-governmental organisation on 20 July 1977. On 15 September that year, it was registered as a charity. It ceased trading in October 2010 and went into insolvency.

== History ==
Healthlink was founded by Dr Katherine Elliott and other members of the Intermediate Technology Development Group (now Practical Action) Health Panel. Its aim was to promote health education by collecting and disseminating information on solutions to health and development problems, providing technical support to those involved in health and community development programmes throughout the world. In 1978, AHRTAG became the first World Health Organization (WHO) Collaborating Centre for Appropriate Technology in Health.

One of its initial activities was to promote the outcomes of the WHO/UNICEF International Conference on Primary Health Care, held in Alma Ata in 1978, which launched primary health care as a means of achieving Health for All. This focus on primary health was a fundamental driver of Healthlink's activities throughout its existence.

At around the same time, significant breakthroughs were being made in the understanding of diarrhoea and in the development of inexpensive ways to treat this major childhood killer. During this period, at least five million children a year were dying worldwide from diarrhoea-related causes. The WHO's Diarrhoeal Diseases Control Programme worked closely with ARHTAG to launch an international newsletter on topic, initially called Diarrhoea Dialogue, but later renamed to Dialogue on Diarrhoea. Published four times a year, 60 issues were produced by May 1995, by which time copies were available in English, Chinese, French, Portuguese, Spanish, Tamil, Urdu and Vietnamese, reaching more than a quarter of a million readers worldwide.

This became one of a series of newsletters aimed at primary level health care workers around the world. By the end of 1994, its four regular newsletters – covering child health topics, HIV infection and AIDS, disability, and primary health care management – had a total circulation of 600,000 in 11 languages and an estimated three million readers worldwide. They were distributed free of charge, and with the introduction of new technologies, agreement was reached with SatelLife to circulate electronic versions of the newsletters (text only) by email. Copies of Dialogue on Diarrhoea, AIDS Action and some copies of Health Action are still available online.

From 1983 to 1988, its executive director was Ken Ritchie. In 1998, 21 years after it was founded, the organisation changed its name to Healthlink Worldwide.
