= 2014 Daventry District Council election =

2014 UK local government election

← 2012	22 May 2014	2015 →

Results of the 2014 Daventry District Council election

The 2014 Daventry District Council election took place on 22 May 2014 to elect members of Daventry District Council in England. This was on the same day as other local elections.

Two seats changed hands with UKIP taking one seat from Labour and one seat from the Conservatives leading to the council being made up as follows; 30 Conservative councillors, 3 Labour councillors, 2 UKIP councillors and 1 Liberal Democrat councillor.

== Election result ==
Daventry local election result 2014
Party	Seats	Gains	Losses	Net gain/loss	Seats %	Votes %	Votes	+/−
Conservative	10	0	1	-1	83.3	48.5	9,195	
UKIP	2	2	0	2	16.7	27.8	5,268	
Labour	0	0	2	-2	0.0	19.7	3,740	
Independent	0	0	0	0	0.0	1.6	307	
Liberal Democrats	0	0	0	0	0.0	1.6	301	
Green	0	0	0	0	0.0	0.8	153	

== Ward results ==
=== Abbey North ===
Abbey North 2014
Party	Candidate	Votes	%	±%
Labour	John Antony Andrews	349	26.3	
Conservative	Gloria Edwards Davidson	482	36.3	
UKIP	Nigel Carr	495	37.3	
Majority		13	1.0	
Turnout		1338	25.22	
UKIP gain from Conservative		Swing		

=== Abbey South ===
Abbey South 2014
Party	Candidate	Votes	%	±%
Conservative	Colin Morgan	602	36.5	
Labour	Peter Frederick Luke	314	19.0	
UKIP	Eric Macanndrais	553	33.5	
Independent	Mark David Andrew Wesley	163	9.9	
Majority		49	3.0	
Turnout		1650	33.38	
Conservative hold		Swing		

=== Brixworth ===
Brixworth 2014
Party	Candidate	Votes	%	±%
Conservative	Kevin Parker	1082	51.9	
Green	Stephen John Whiffen	153	7.3	
Labour	Marie Angela McNally	255	12.2	
Liberal Democrats	Simon Hall	123	5.9	
UKIP	Stephen Pointer	468	22.5	
Majority		614	29.5	
Turnout		2084	39.79	
Conservative hold		Swing		

=== Drayton ===
Drayton 2014
Party	Candidate	Votes	%	±%
Conservative	Amy Howard	435	28.2	
UKIP	Sean Daniel Peter Connors	550	35.6	
Labour	Ken Ritchie	512	33.1	
Liberal Democrats	Inge Nina Freudenreich	38	2.5	
Majority		38	2.5	
Turnout		1545	33.59	
UKIP gain from Labour		Swing		

=== Hill ===
Hill 2014
Party	Candidate	Votes	%	±%
Conservative	Colin Poole	523	41.7	
UKIP	Keith Simpson	435	34.7	
Labour	Robert Peter McNally	281	22.4	
Majority		88	7.0	
Turnout		1255	29.57	
Conservative hold		Swing		

=== Long Buckby ===
Long Buckby 2014
Party	Candidate	Votes	%	±%
Conservative	Steve Osborne	947	42.7	
Labour	Chris Myers	486	21.9	
Liberal Democrats	Neil Arthur Crispin Farmer	140	6.3	
UKIP	Ian Robert James Dexter	627	28.3	
Majority		320	14.4	
Turnout		2216	43	
Conservative hold		Swing		

=== Moulton ===
Moulton 2014
Party	Candidate	Votes	%	±%
Conservative	Mike Warren	627	45.6	
Labour	Mark Anthony Gunther Maryan	252	18.3	
UKIP	Pamela Booker	441	32.1	
Majority		231	16.8	
Turnout		1374	39.72	
Conservative hold		Swing		

=== Spratton ===
Spratton 2014
Party	Candidate	Votes	%	±%
Conservative	Barry Frenchman	816	57.5	
Labour	Elizabeth Anne Ritchie	200	14.1	
UKIP	Jennifer Leighton	395	27.95	
Majority		421		
Turnout		1418	41.05	
Conservative hold		Swing		

=== Weedon ===
Weedon 2014
Party	Candidate	Votes	%	±%
Conservative	David Smith	1093	54.2	
Labour	Emma Clare Collins	265	13.2	
UKIP	John Clifford Gale	559	27.7	
Independent	Tom Price	144	7.1	
Majority		534	26.5	
Turnout		2015	41.66	
Conservative hold		Swing		

=== Welford ===
Welford 2014
Party	Candidate	Votes	%	±%
Conservative	Cecile Irving-Swift	1096	73.8	
Labour	Sue Myers	360	26.2	
Majority		736	49.5	
Turnout		1486	45.28	
Conservative hold		Swing		

=== Woodford ===
Woodford 2014
Party	Candidate	Votes	%	±%
Conservative	Bob Patchett	966	49.5	
Labour	Richard Mark Buck	380	19.5	
UKIP	Tony Scott	595	30.5	
Majority		371	19.0	
Turnout		1951	36.52	
Conservative hold		Swing		

=== Yelvertoft ===
Yelvertoft 2014
Party	Candidate	Votes	%	±%
Conservative	Alan Chantler	481	67.0	−10.8
Labour	John Janet Muriel	86	11.2	−2.0
UKIP	Gail Smith	150	20.9	+20.9
Majority		331	46.1	−18.5
Turnout		718	45.65	−5.79
Conservative hold		Swing		
