= Hollowell =

Coordinates: 52.3373°N 0.9961°W

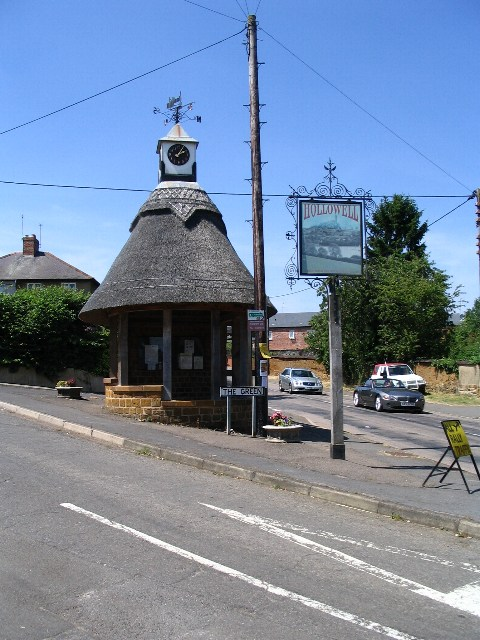
- The Green

- Location within Northamptonshire
- Population: 385 (2011)
- OS grid reference: SP6871
  - London: 74 miles (119 km)
- Unitary authority: West Northamptonshire
- Ceremonial county: Northamptonshire
- Region: East Midlands
- Country: England
- Sovereign state: United Kingdom
- Post town: Northampton
- Postcode district: NN6
- Dialling code: 01604
- Police: Northamptonshire
- Fire: Northamptonshire
- Ambulance: East Midlands
- UK Parliament: Daventry

Hollowell is a village and civil parish in West Northamptonshire, England. At the time of the 2001 census, the parish's population, including the nearby hamlet of Teeton, was 353 people, increasing to 385 at the 2011 Census. The village was originally a hamlet of Guilsborough, becoming a separate parish from 1850. Hollowell is mentioned in the Domesday Survey of 1086 as belonging the Bishop of Lincoln having "... 4 villeins with 1 bordar having 1 plough. It was, and is worth, 10 schillings. Bardi held (it) freely."

== Geography ==
The village is 9 miles (14 km) north-west of the town of Northampton and just off a side road west of the village of Creaton on the A5199, formerly the A50, trunk road. About 5 miles (8 km) north on the A5199 there is a junction with the A14 trunk road, a dual carriageway connecting the M1 and M6 motorway interchange at Catthorpe with Kettering, Cambridge, Ipswich and the port of Felixstowe.

== Landmarks ==
Hollowell Reservoir is a 140-acre (0.57 km^{2}) reservoir between Northampton and Market Harborough and just north of the village. It has a sailing club and is also used for fishing. It is the scene of a number of double-figure tench catches during the 2004 season, with a record of over 11 lb (5.0 kg).

Within the boundaries of the parochial parish stood the Northampton County Sanatorium (also known locally as Creaton Hospital), a tuberculosis hospital in operation between 1910 and 1979. In the 1980s it was converted to 13 private houses and is now called Highfield Park.

== History and events ==
The villages name means 'hollow spring/stream'.

Being at the bottom of a valley, the village was vulnerable to icy and snow-filled roads before the use of council gritting. In the winter of 1947, Hollowell and Guilsborough were cut off from the main (Welford) road for several weeks. A Mr J Smith, who lived in Guilsborough, was recorded as delivering bread to the inhabitants on horseback during this time.

Hollowell Steam is a steam and heavy horse show held annually near the village on the first full weekend of July. The event was first held in 1986 to raise funds to repair the village's church roof. It is now one of the largest steam rallies in the country, with 45 engines expected in 2007. Over £75,000 in funds were raised in 2004, distributed to local charities and groups. The event is run by Allen Eaton MBE.

From 1974 to 2021 it was in Daventry district.

== Sports Clubs ==
Hollowell Reservoir is home to Hollowell Sailing Club and Hollowell Scullers Rowing Club
