= Wyke Hamon =

Coordinates: 52.04660°N 0.91927°W

Wyke Hamon is a manor in Wicken, Northamptonshire, England. In the early 16th century it was owned by John Spencer of the prominent Spencer family of aristocrats.

The first Lord of Wyke Hamon, Maino Brito, was a contemporary of William the Conqueror.
