= 2011 Daventry District Council election =

2011 UK local government election

← 2010	5 May 2011	2012 →

Results of the 2011 Daventry District Council election

Elections to Daventry District Council took place on Thursday 5 May 2011. One third of the council (13 seats) was up for election. The previous elections produced a majority for the Conservative Party.

== Election result ==
Daventry District Council election, 2011
Party	Seats	Gains	Losses	Net gain/loss	Seats %	Votes %	Votes	+/−
Conservative	12	0	1	-1	92.3	59.8	9,774	-9.1
Labour	1	1	0	1	7.7	28.1	4,588	+9.3
Liberal Democrats	0	0	0	0	0	6.4	1,045	+3.8
Green	0	0	0	0	0	3.2	528	+0.6
UKIP	0	0	0	0	0	2.5	399	+2.5

== Ward results ==
Abbey North Ward
Party	Candidate	Votes	%	±%
UKIP	Adam Charles Collyer	399	18.5	
Conservative	David Earles	1,030	47.6	
Labour	David Thomas James	733	33.9	
Majority		303	13.7	
Turnout			32.0%	
Conservative hold		Swing		

Abbey South Ward
Party	Candidate	Votes	%	±%
Labour	Nigel Carr	402	34.9	+14.4
Conservative	Chris Over	749	65.1	+12.7
Majority		347	30.1	6.8
Turnout			40.2	
Conservative hold		Swing		

Badby Ward
Party	Candidate	Votes	%	±%
Liberal Democrats	Richard Mark Buck	121	13.4	+13.4
Labour	Maureen Winifred Luke	143	15.8	−2.3
Conservative	Tony Scott	642	70.9	−11
Majority		499	55.1	−8.7
Turnout			56.8	
Conservative hold		Swing		

Brixworth North Ward
Party	Candidate	Votes	%	±%
Liberal Democrats	Samuel Eric Barratt	373	17.2	17.2
Green	Steve Whiffen	381	17.6	17.6
Conservative	Liz Wiig	1,411	65.2	−14.9
Majority		1,030	47.6	−12.6
Turnout			46.9	
Conservative hold		Swing		

Clipston Ward
Party	Candidate	Votes	%	±%
Conservative	Pam Booker	uncontested		
Majority				
Turnout				
Conservative hold		Swing		

Crick Ward
Party	Candidate	Votes	%	±%
Conservative	Richard Hubert Atterbury	538	74.6	−8.4
Labour	Janet Muriel John	183	25.4	+8.4
Majority		355	49.2	−16.8
Turnout			49.9	
Conservative hold		Swing		

Drayton Ward
Party	Candidate	Votes	%	±%
Conservative	Chris Eddon	627	38.4	−17.9
Liberal Democrats	Liz Pym	150	9.2	+9.2
Labour	Wendy Jane Randall	855	52.4	8.7
Majority		228	14.0	1.4
Turnout			35.5	
Labour gain from Conservative		Swing		

Hill Ward
Party	Candidate	Votes	%	±%
Conservative	Andrew Paul Harris	805	55.6	8.6
Labour	Ron Pursey	643	44.4	22.4
Majority		162	11.2	−4.8
Turnout			35.7	
Conservative hold		Swing		

Long Buckby Ward
Party	Candidate	Votes	%	±%
Liberal Democrats	Neil Arthur Crispin Farmer	281	16.5	2.5
Labour	Chris Myers	572	33.5	10.1
Conservative	Diana Elizabeth Osborne	853	50.0	−12.6
Majority		281	16.5	−22.7
Turnout			50.6	
Conservative hold		Swing		

Moulton Ward
Party	Candidate	Votes	%	±%
Labour	Matthew Nobles	357	22.9	22.9
Conservative	Mike Warren	1,204	77.1	4.2
Majority		847	54.3	−1.5
Turnout			46.8	
Conservative hold		Swing		

Walgrave Ward
Party	Candidate	Votes	%	±%
Conservative	Ann Carter	555	65.1	−13.6
Labour	Maggie Saxon	297	34.9	13.6
Majority		258	30.3	−27.2
Turnout			45.9	
Conservative hold		Swing		

Weedon Ward
Party	Candidate	Votes	%	±%
Labour	Bruce Armstrong Nichols	267	22.2	9.8
Conservative	Kevin Victor Perry	815	67.8	−7.1
Liberal Democrats	Christopher Robin Salaman	120	10.0	−2.7
Majority		548	45.6	−16.6
Turnout			45.9	
Conservative hold		Swing		

Welford Ward
Party	Candidate	Votes	%	±%
Conservative	Kay Driver	545	65.8	−8.3
Labour	Sue Myers	136	16.4	16.4
Green	Katharine Louise Wicksteed	147	17.8	−8.1
Majority		298	48.1	−0.1
Turnout			53.7	
Conservative hold		Swing		
