= 2003 Daventry District Council election =

2003 UK local government election

- 1 May 2003

Results of the 2003 Daventry District Council election

Elections to Daventry District Council were held on 1 May 2003. One third of the council was up for election and the Conservative Party stayed in overall control of the council. Overall turnout was 34%.

After the election, the composition of the council was:

- Conservative 33
- Labour 4

== Election result ==
Daventry local election result 2003
Party	Seats	Gains	Losses	Net gain/loss	Seats %	Votes %	Votes	+/−
Conservative	12	7	0	+7	92.3	64.4	7,708	+5.0%
Labour	1	0	5	-5	7.7	27.0	3,236	-3.0%
Liberal Democrats	0	0	1	-1	0	6.9	827	-3.7%
Independent	0	0	1	-1	0	1.7	207	+1.7%

== Ward results ==
Abbey North
Party	Candidate	Votes	%	±%
Conservative	Barry Howard	607	59.1	+3.2
Labour	Jean Tucker	420	40.9	−3.2
Majority		187	18.2	+6.4
Turnout		1,027		

Abbey South
Party	Candidate	Votes	%	±%
Conservative	Christopher Over	638	72.8	
Labour	Bruce Nichols	238	27.2	
Majority		400	45.6	
Turnout		876		
Conservative hold		Swing		

Badby
Party	Candidate	Votes	%	±%
Conservative	Anthony Scott	516	83.1	
Labour	Kenneth Ritchie	105	16.9	
Majority		411	66.2	
Turnout		621		
Conservative hold		Swing		

Brixworth
Party	Candidate	Votes	%	±%
Conservative	Elizabeth Wiig	767	52.4	+1.2
Liberal Democrats	Frances Peacock	344	23.5	−11.9
Independent	Kathleen Redley	207	14.1	+14.1
Labour	Mark Mulcahey	146	10.0	−3.4
Majority		423	28.9	+13.1
Turnout		1,464		

Clipston
Party	Candidate	Votes	%	±%
Conservative	Pamela Betts	550	79.6	
Labour	Anthony Sparrowhawk	141	20.4	
Majority		409	59.2	
Turnout		691		
Conservative hold		Swing		

Drayton
Party	Candidate	Votes	%	±%
Labour	Penelope Price	466	51.8	−1.3
Conservative	Sally Smith	433	48.2	+1.3
Majority		33	3.6	−2.6
Turnout		899		
Labour hold		Swing		

Hill (2)
Party	Candidate	Votes	%	±%
Conservative	Andrew Harris	571		
Conservative	Robert Walduck	532		
Labour	David Nicholl	336		
Labour	Gareth Pritchard	306		
Turnout		1,745		

Long Buckby
Party	Candidate	Votes	%	±%
Conservative	Diana Osbourne	798	60.6	+0.6
Labour	Christopher Myers	518	39.4	−0.6
Majority		280	21.2	+1.2
Turnout		1,316		

Moulton
Party	Candidate	Votes	%	±%
Conservative	Michael Warren	658	57.7	−1.7
Liberal Democrats	Robert Strudwick	483	42.3	+20.5
Majority		175	15.4	−22.2
Turnout		1,141		

Walgrave
Party	Candidate	Votes	%	±%
Conservative	Ann Carter	420	61.6	
Labour	Maughan Johnson	262	38.4	
Majority		158	23.2	
Turnout		682		

Weedon
Party	Candidate	Votes	%	±%
Conservative	Kevin Perry	740	83.3	
Labour	Dominic Luke	148	16.7	
Majority		592	66.6	
Turnout		888		
Conservative hold		Swing		

Welford
Party	Candidate	Votes	%	±%
Conservative	Catherine Boardman	478	76.1	
Labour	Michael Davenport	150	23.9	
Majority		328	52.2	
Turnout		628		
Conservative hold		Swing		
