= 2007 Daventry District Council election =

2007 UK local government election

← 2006	3 May 2007	2008 →

Results of the 2007 Daventry District Council election

Elections to Daventry District Council were held on 3 May 2007, in Northamptonshire, England. One third of the council was up for election and the Conservative Party stayed in overall control of the council.

After the election, the composition of the council was:

- Conservative 35
- Liberal Democrat 2
- Labour 1

== Election result ==
Daventry local election result 2007
Party	Seats	Gains	Losses	Net gain/loss	Seats %	Votes %	Votes	+/−
Conservative	12	1	0	+1	100.0	68.9	8,309	+7.6%
Labour	0	0	1	-1	0	18.8	2,271	-1.3%
Independent	0	0	0	0	0	7.1	857	+7.1%
Liberal Democrats	0	0	0	0	0	2.6	314	-14.5%
Green	0	0	0	0	0	2.6	313	+1.1%

== Ward results ==
Abbey South
Party	Candidate	Votes	%	±%
Conservative	Chris Over	520	52.4	−14.8
Independent	Mike Fletcher	269	27.1	+27.1
Labour	Peter Luke	203	20.5	−12.3
Majority		251	25.3	−9.1
Turnout		992		
Conservative hold		Swing		

Badby
Party	Candidate	Votes	%	±%
Conservative	Anthony Scott	571	81.9	−1.2
Labour	Maureen Luke	126	18.1	+1.2
Majority		445	63.8	−2.4
Turnout		697		
Conservative hold		Swing		

Brixworth
Party	Candidate	Votes	%	±%
Conservative	Liz Wiig	1,285	80.1	
Labour	Chris Myers	319	19.9	
Majority		966	60.2	
Turnout		1,604		
Conservative hold		Swing		

Clipston
Party	Candidate	Votes	%	±%
Conservative	Pamela Betts	605	81.0	+1.4
Labour	Janet Penrose	142	19.0	−1.4
Majority		463	62.0	+2.8
Turnout		747		
Conservative hold		Swing		

Crick
Party	Candidate	Votes	%	±%
Conservative	Richard Atterbury	494	83.0	
Labour	Jane Cartlidge	101	17.0	
Majority		393	66.0	
Turnout		595		
Conservative hold		Swing		

Drayton
Party	Candidate	Votes	%	±%
Conservative	Terry Mullett	688	56.3	−0.6
Labour	Penelope Price	534	43.7	+0.6
Majority		154	12.6	−1.2
Turnout		1,222		
Conservative gain from Labour		Swing		

Hill
Party	Candidate	Votes	%	±%
Conservative	Andrew Harris	571	47.0	−21.4
Independent	Samantha Webb	376	31.0	+31.0
Labour	Nigel Carr	267	22.0	−9.6
Majority		104	16.0	−20.8
Turnout		1,214		
Conservative hold		Swing		

Long Buckby
Party	Candidate	Votes	%	±%
Conservative	Diana Osbourne	814	62.6	−4.7
Labour	Sue Myers	304	23.4	+6.1
Liberal Democrats	Bob Patchett	182	14.0	−1.4
Majority		510	39.2	−10.8
Turnout		1,300		

Moulton
Party	Candidate	Votes	%	±%
Conservative	Mike Warren	902	72.9	
Independent	George Patterson	212	17.1	
Green	Jenny Fear	124	10.0	
Majority		690	55.8	
Turnout		1,238		

Walgrave
Party	Candidate	Votes	%	±%
Conservative	Ann Carter	541	78.7	+17.1
Labour	Emma Poole	146	21.3	−17.1
Majority		395	57.4	+34.2
Turnout		687		

Weedon
Party	Candidate	Votes	%	±%
Conservative	Kevin Perry	778	74.9	+1.1
Liberal Democrats	Malcolm Adcock	132	12.7	+12.7
Labour	Bea Price	129	12.4	−13.8
Majority		646	62.2	+14.6
Turnout		1,039		
Conservative hold		Swing		

Welford
Party	Candidate	Votes	%	±%
Conservative	Catherine Boardman	540	74.1	−2.0
Green	Katharine Wicksteed	189	25.9	+25.9
Majority		351	48.2	−4.0
Turnout		729		
Conservative hold		Swing		
