= 2012 Daventry District Council election =

2012 UK local government election

← 2011	3 May 2012	2014 →

Results of the 2012 Daventry District Council election

The 2012 Daventry District Council election took place on 3 May 2012 to elect members of Daventry District Council in England. This was on the same day as other 2012 United Kingdom local elections.

As there were boundary changes which created new wards and reduced councillors from 38 to 36 all seats were up for election rather than a third as normal. After the election the council was made up as follows; 29 Conservative councillors, 6 Labour councillors and 1 Liberal Democrat councillor.

== Election result ==
Daventry District Council Election, 2012
Party	Seats	Gains	Losses	Net gain/loss	Seats %	Votes %	Votes	+/−
Conservative	29			-5	80.5	63.0	24,117	
Labour	6			+4	16.7	20.1	7,696	
Liberal Democrats	1			-1	2.8	9.0	3,438	
Green	0			0	0	2.1	808	
Independent	0			0	0	5.9	2,522	
