= Harlestone =

Village in Northamptonshire, England

Coordinates: 52.2741°N 0.9682°W

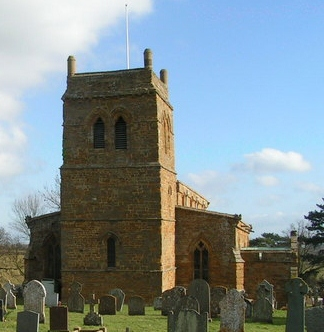
- St Andrew’s Church, Harlestone

- Location within Northamptonshire
- Population: 445 (2011)
- OS grid reference: SP7064
- Civil parish: Harlestone
- Unitary authority: West Northamptonshire
- Ceremonial county: Northamptonshire
- Region: East Midlands
- Country: England
- Sovereign state: United Kingdom
- Post town: Northampton
- Postcode district: NN7
- Dialling code: 01604
- Police: Northamptonshire
- Fire: Northamptonshire
- Ambulance: East Midlands
- UK Parliament: Daventry

Harlestone is a village and civil parish in the West Northamptonshire district, in the ceremonial county of Northamptonshire, England. The parish had a recorded population of 445 in the 2011 census. From 1974 to 2021 it was in Daventry district.

The village is divided into two smaller settlements: Upper Harlestone and Lower Harlestone, which are linked by road, footpaths and bridleways. Lower Harlestone lies along the A428, and Upper Harlestone is directly to the south-west. Both settlements are approximately five miles north-west of the town of Northampton and south-east of the neighbouring country estate of Althorp.

== History ==
Evidence of prehistoric settlement can be found in the area of Harlestone, including a Scheduled Ancient Monument to the east of the village, where the remains of prehistoric settlement can be seen from aerial photography.

An Iron Age site has been identified at the quarry site on the southern edge of Lower Harlestone, with possible evidence of landscape features dating from the late Bronze Age.

Evidence of Roman occupation is also prevalent, particularly to the west, where the remains of a Roman dwelling were excavated in a field named Sharoah in 1927, and a hoard of over 800 coins found. Further evidence of Romano-British ironworking has been located near to Upper Harlestone in the west.

It is highly likely that the name Harlestone stems from Anglo-Saxon or Danish origin. It is variously spelt Erlestone, Herolvestone and Herolvestune in early records, possibly from the name of a local land owner.

St Andrew's Churchyard is a possible Saxon site, due to its rounded shape and the presence of a spring beneath its nave.

A middle-eastern gold coin was unearthed during cleaning work on the nearby stables, which implies that an individual from Harlestone took part in the Crusades in the 11th century and was buried with spoils.

Harlestone may have been the subject of Viking raids in the early 11th century, and many plots are noted in the Domesday Book of 1086 as being of a "waste" nature. Harlestone was partly granted to the Count of Mortain by his half-brother William the Conqueror and partly to William Peverel, including three manors. Domesday Book also notes 15 freedmen in the village, a mill and a priest.

Henry de Bray held one of the manors of Harlestone in the late 13th century and left extensive records of his works and life in estate books, which are now held in the British Museum.

He completed the construction of his manor, on the site of the current Manor Farm, including various gardens and a mill, which is quite possibly the mill whose ruins stand in Lower Harlestone.

Quarry scars in Lower Harlestone are tentatively dated to the post-medieval period, but are described by Morton in 1712 as "very ancient". It is possible that these earthworks were produced in the construction of de Bray's manor complex.

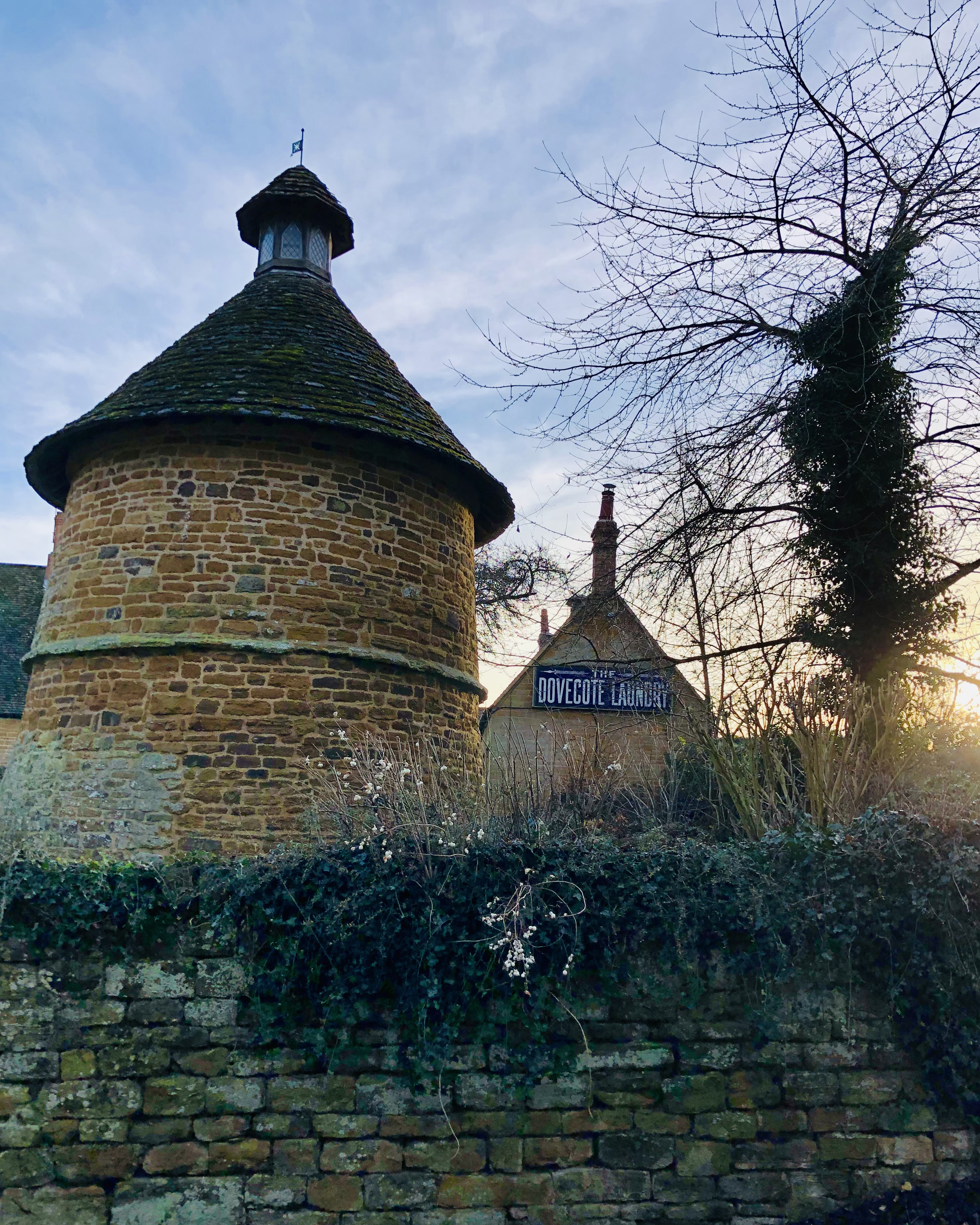
The Dovecote in Harlestone

The second manor of Harlestone was owned by the Lumley family from the 13th century, presumably that previously belonging to the Count of Mortain, and situated in Upper Harlestone on the site of Dovecote House. It comprised a hall, stables, outbuildings and a dovecote. This structure still survives as part of the 15th-century dovecote on the site, and is the only building left from the manorial complex. Roger Lumley is named "Lord of Harlestone" in 1316 and his descendant Robert Lumley purchased Althorp in 1364, but it was re-sold in 1414 by his son. They continued to hold the manor in Harlestone until 1500 when Thomas Andrew of Charwelton bought the land, also permitting them to stay in their accommodation.

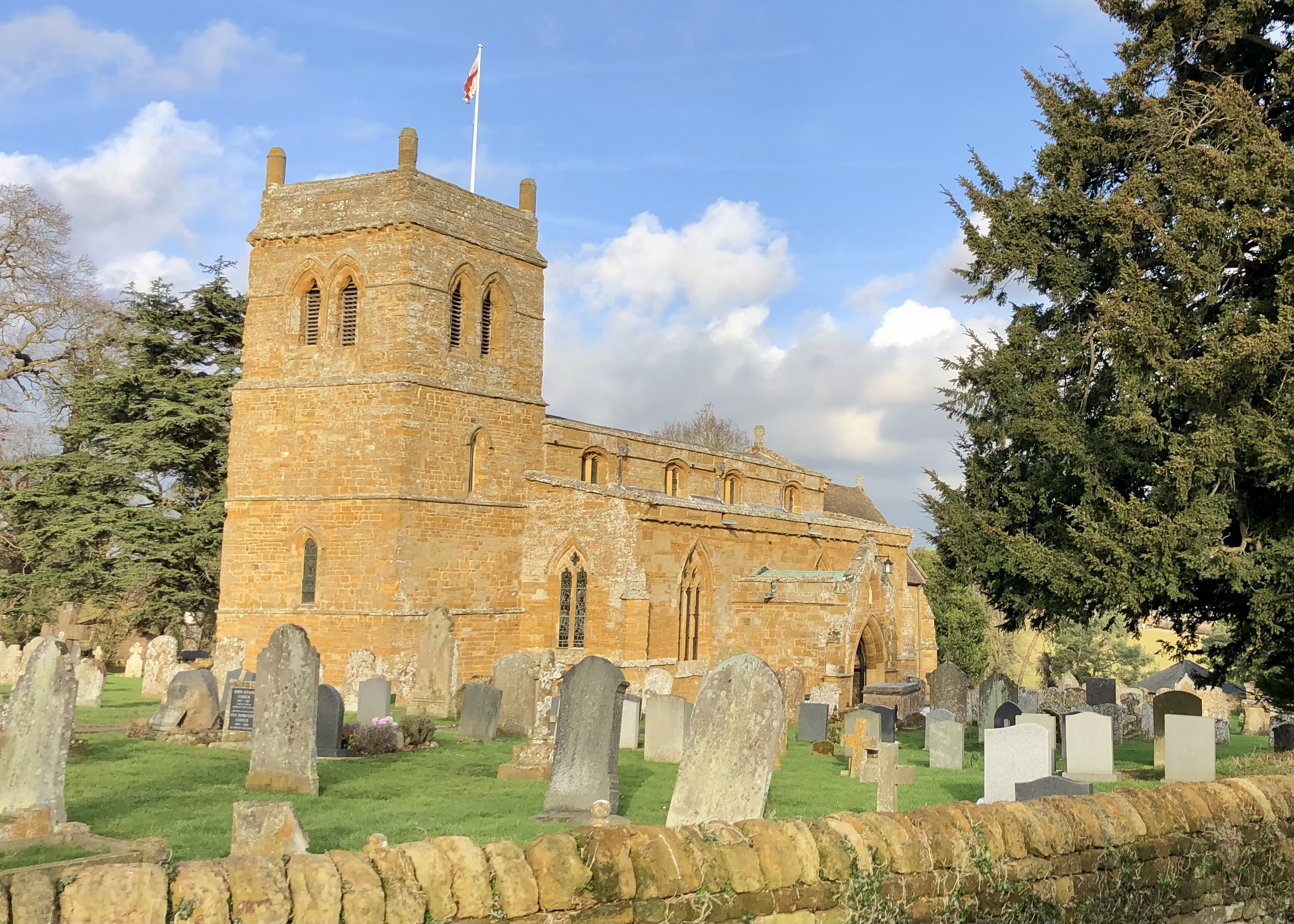
St Andrew's Church

Under Henry de Bray there was also a remodelling of St Andrew’s Church, creating much of the building we see today. It was mostly built between 1320 and 1325, although the tower dates back to the 12th century, with de Bray providing the stone and timber.

The third and final estate at this time was owned by the Bulmer family, whose lands were placed into the hands of trustees in 1441 by Sir Ralph de Bulmer, and not mentioned again in literature until the 18th century.

The three earliest surviving dwellings within the village are from the late 17th century, all located in Upper Harlestone. Hearth Tax Returns of the late 17th century show that the village had 115 houses, of which 95 had one hearth. Larger properties are indicated by these records, including a property owned by Thomas Andrew which had twelve hearths. Several farms are noted as having two or three hearths.

During the English Civil War, the evidence points towards the majority of Harlestone supporting the Parliamentarian cause, particularly because of its proximity to the staunchly anti-royalist Northampton. The exception is the royalist Sir Lewis Dyve, then owner of Henry de Bray's Manor Farm, whose lands were confiscated and handed to the Andrew family.

Harlestone was a well-connected village. Alongside many enduring internal pathways, road maps of John Ogilvy of 1675 indicate that the current A428 to Dunchurch initially fell to the west of Upper Harlestone, skirting down past Althorp, leading to Kingsthorpe in Northampton. By 1738, the Northampton to Dunchurch turnpike had been established on the eastern side where the A428 now travels.

In 1715, Thomas Andrew built Harlestone House, a grand neo-classical mansion on the edge of a lake, surrounded by heath parkland. In 1753, they also acquired the Bulmer Estate, which, when added to the sequestered lands of Sir Lewis Dyve, brought the majority of Harlestone under Andrew's control.

The enclosure of Harlestone occurred in 1766, with the main gainer being Robert Andrew. Many of the large farms in the area are enclosure farms, including Mill Farm, Glebe Farm and Fleetland Farm. Many of the other farms in the village remain from earlier strip farming, such as Rock Farm.

Between 1809 and 1811, Robert Andrew employed the noted architects and landscape designers, Humphrey and John Adey Repton, to make alterations to Harlestone House. The house was demolished in 1940, but the Grade II* listed stables, the classically designed dam bridge and boathouse, and the paddocks still exist.

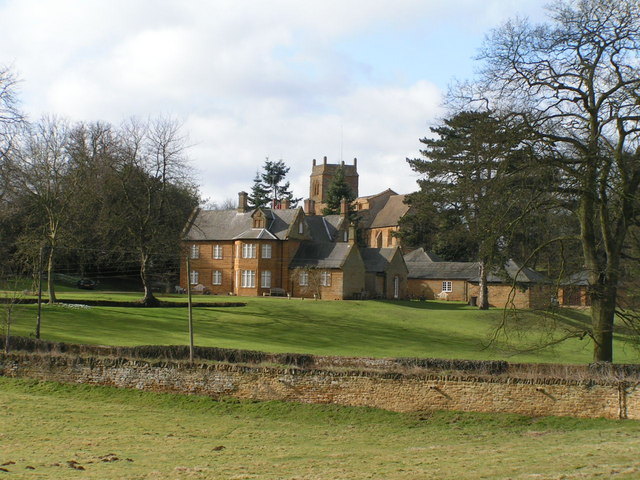
The Rectory

In 1829, Robert Andrew sold the Harlestone Estate to Earl Spencer of Althorp. Many properties were built in the 19th century under the Althorp Estate, particularly worker's cottages, like the sets of Ten Cottages in Upper and Lower Harlestone. A quarry face, possibly from this time, is still visible along Port Road, near to Park Farmhouse. The consistent architectural style pervades building of this time in Harlestone and the neighbouring villages. The Althorp Estate is still the major land owner in the village, and some properties may have possible applicable covenants.

The 1834 foundation of the Union for Poor Law Administration saw Harlestone in the Brixworth Union, and the village workhouse was built, now forming several houses on Port Road, Upper Harlestone.

Non-conformist religion was very popular in Northamptonshire, and land for the former Baptist Chapel in Upper Harlestone, now a dwelling, was granted by the Fifth Earl Spencer in 1873.

In the 1870s, the Imperial Gazetteer of England and Wales described the parish as follows:

"a parish in Brixworth district, Northamptonshire; 2½ miles WSW of Brampton railway station, and 4 NW of Northampton. It has a post-office under Northampton. Acres, 2,530. Real property, £4,314. Pop., 615. Houses, 138. The property is divided among a few. The manor belongs to Earl Spencer. Harlestone Hall is a chief residence. Traces of an old fort are on Dylve's Heath. The living is a rectory in the diocese of Peterborough. Value, £577. Patron, Earl Spencer. The church is of the 14th century, very good, and has an old font. There are a national school, and charities upwards of £100."

The remains of brickworks from the 19th century can be found in Upper Harlestone in the form of a large kiln, which provided local people with brick for building.

In 1924, the Duchess of Grafton started a fund to build the Village Institute in Upper Harlestone.

The Althorp Estate sold the land of the former Harlestone House to the Northampton Golf Club in 1990, and their clubhouse now occupies the former site of the house.

Many properties within the village were also sold at this time by Althorp to private owners. Owing to the provision of back land areas, areas for pigsties and garden plots, some infill development to the rear of historic properties has occurred, as well as between dwellings.

== Harlestone Firs ==
Also recorded as Harlestone Furze in the records of the Northamptonshire Natural History Society. Harlestone Firs, a large wood and country park, lies just outside the village with a garden centre on the other side of the A428.

== Population ==
The population as recorded in the decannual censuses peaked in the 1830s at just under 650 people, falling to 420 in 2001:

1801	1811	1821	1831	1841	1851	1881	1891	1901	1911	1921	1931	1951	1961	2001	2011
437	563	564	645	639	610	569	613	575	536	541	511	483	413	420	445
