= Teeton =

Coordinates: 52.3276°N 0.9809°W

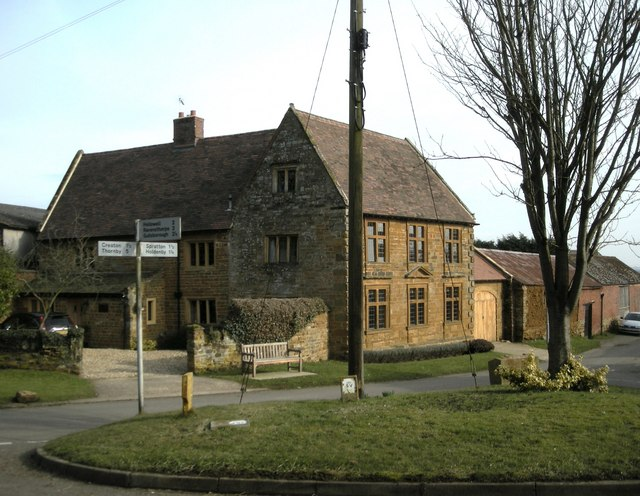

- Location within Northamptonshire
- Population: 50
- OS grid reference: SP6970
- Civil parish: Hollowell
- Unitary authority: West Northamptonshire
- Ceremonial county: Northamptonshire
- Region: East Midlands
- Country: England
- Sovereign state: United Kingdom
- Post town: Northampton
- Postcode district: NN6
- Dialling code: 01604
- Police: Northamptonshire
- Fire: Northamptonshire
- Ambulance: East Midlands
- UK Parliament: Daventry

Teeton is a village in the civil parish of Hollowell, in West Northamptonshire, England. In 1931 the parish had a population of 55. In 1866 Teeton became a civil parish, on 1 April 1935 the parish was abolished and merged with Hollowell.

The village's name means 'Beacon'. The village is situated on the end of a ridge.
