= 2000 Daventry District Council election =

2000 UK local government election

- 4 May 2000

Elections to Daventry District Council were held on 4 May 2000. One third of the council was up for election and the Conservative Party stayed in overall control of the council.

After the election, the composition of the council was:

- Conservative 20
- Labour 13
- Liberal Democrat 3
- Independent 2

== Election result ==
Daventry local election result 2000
Party	Seats	Gains	Losses	Net gain/loss	Seats %	Votes %	Votes	+/−
Conservative	8			0	66.7			
Labour	4			0	33.3			
