= Church with Chapel Brampton =

Civil parish in Northamptonshire, England

Coordinates: 52.29°N 0.94°W

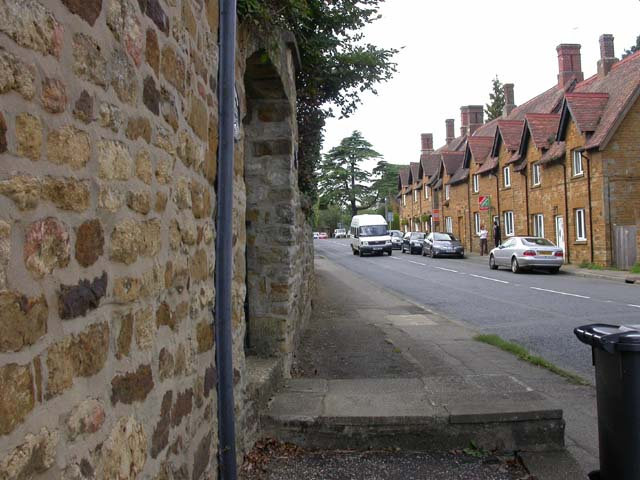
- Welford Road, Chapel Brampton

- Location within Northamptonshire
- Civil parish: Church with Chapel Brampton
- Unitary authority: West Northamptonshire
- Ceremonial county: Northamptonshire
- Region: East Midlands
- Country: England
- Sovereign state: United Kingdom

Church with Chapel Brampton is a civil parish in the West Northamptonshire district, in the ceremonial county of Northamptonshire, England. The two main settlements are Church Brampton and Chapel Brampton (sometimes known as The Bramptons). The population of the parish was 808 at the 2011 census. The parish was formed on 1 April 2009 from "Chapel Brampton" and "Church Brampton".

This civil parish is part of the ecclesiastical benefice of 'Brington with Whilton and Norton and Church Brampton with Chapel Brampton and Harlestone and East Haddon and Holdenby'.

In 2022, research published by Savills reported that the parish was the most desired place to live in Northamptonshire and one of the most desired in the UK. In 2021, Golf Lane in Church Brampton was named the most expensive street in Northamptonshire.
