= 2006 Daventry District Council election =

2006 UK local government election

← 2004	4 May 2006	2007 →

Results of the 2006 Daventry District Council election

Elections to Daventry District Council were held on 4 May 2006. One third of the council was up for election and the Conservative Party stayed in overall control of the council.

After the election, the composition of the council was:

- Conservative 34
- Labour 2
- Liberal Democrat 2

== Election result ==
Daventry local election result 2006
Party	Seats	Gains	Losses	Net gain/loss	Seats %	Votes %	Votes	+/−
Conservative	12	1	0	+1	92.3	61.3	4,909	-1.6%
Liberal Democrats	1	1	0	+1	7.7	17.1	1,373	+8.2%
Labour	0	0	1	-1	0	20.1	1,609	-8.1%
Green	0	0	0	0	0	1.5	123	+1.5%
Independent	0	0	1	-1	0	0	0	+0.0%

6 Conservative candidates were unopposed.

== Ward results ==
Abbey North
Party	Candidate	Votes	%	±%
Conservative	Christopher Long	748	49.7	−11.0
Labour	David Nicoll	382	25.4	−13.9
Liberal Democrats	Malcolm Adcock	376	25.0	+25.0
Majority		366	24.3	+2.9
Turnout		1,506		
Conservative hold		Swing		

Barby and Kilsby
Party	Candidate	Votes	%	±%
Liberal Democrats	Brian Lomax	690	51.8	−2.7
Conservative	John Richards	641	48.2	+2.7
Majority		49	3.6	−5.4
Turnout		1,331		
Liberal Democrats gain from Independent		Swing		

Brampton
Party	Candidate	Votes	%	±%
Conservative	Kenneth Melling	unopposed		
Conservative hold		Swing		

Brixworth
Party	Candidate	Votes	%	±%
Conservative	Nicholas Bunting	unopposed		
Conservative hold		Swing		

Byfield
Party	Candidate	Votes	%	±%
Conservative	David Jeyes	unopposed		
Conservative hold		Swing		

Drayton
Party	Candidate	Votes	%	±%
Conservative	Leslie Poole	667	56.9	−2.3
Labour	Nigel Carr	505	43.1	+2.3
Majority		162	13.8	−4.6
Turnout		1,172		
Conservative gain from Labour		Swing		

Hill
Party	Candidate	Votes	%	±%
Conservative	Alan Hills	772	68.4	+1.4
Labour	Stephen Willetts	357	31.6	−1.4
Majority		415	36.8	+2.8
Turnout		1,129		
Conservative hold		Swing		

Long Buckby
Party	Candidate	Votes	%	±%
Conservative	Stephen Osborne	954	67.3	+6.7
Labour	Christopher Myers	245	17.3	−22.1
Liberal Democrats	Neil Farmer	219	15.4	+15.4
Majority		709	50.0	+28.8
Turnout		1,418		
Conservative hold		Swing		

Moulton
Party	Candidate	Votes	%	±%
Conservative	Daniel Cribbin	unopposed		
Conservative hold		Swing		

Spratton
Party	Candidate	Votes	%	±%
Conservative	Frances Peacock	unopposed		
Conservative hold		Swing		

West Haddon and Guilsborough
Party	Candidate	Votes	%	±%
Conservative	John Millar	660	84.6	+4.8
Labour	Jane Cartlidge	120	15.4	−4.8
Majority		540	69.2	+9.6
Turnout		780		
Conservative hold		Swing		

Woodford
Party	Candidate	Votes	%	±%
Conservative	Elizabeth Griffin	unopposed		
Conservative hold		Swing		

Yelvertoft
Party	Candidate	Votes	%	±%
Conservative	Katharine Hemmings	467	68.9	−13.7
Green	Katharine Wicksteed	123	18.1	+18.1
Liberal Democrats	John Hurst	88	13.0	+13.0
Majority		344	50.8	−14.4
Turnout		678		
Conservative hold		Swing		
