= 2018 Daventry District Council election =

2018 UK local government election

- 3 May 2018

Results of the 2018 Daventry District Council election

The 2018 Daventry District Council election was held on Thursday 3 May 2018 to elect members of Daventry District Council in England.This was on the same day as other local elections.

This was to be the final elections for Daventry District Council due to the poor running of Northamptonshire County Council by the local Conservative Party administration, leading to new unitary authorities for the county being proposed. The Caller Report into the running of Northamptonshire County Council suggested that any elections currently scheduled for 2019 be abandoned and elections for the new authorities held in May 2020. Due to the COVID-19 pandemic in England, these were delayed to May 2021.

The make up of the council after the elections was 30 Conservative councillors, 5 Labour councillors and 1 Liberal Democrat councillor.

== Election result ==
Daventry Local Election Result 2018
| Party | This election | | | Full council | | | This election | | |
| Party | Seats | Net | Seats % | Other | Total | Total % | Votes | Votes % | +/− |
|---|---|---|---|---|---|---|---|---|---|
| Conservative | 10 | 0 | 83.3 | 20 | 30 | 83.3 | 10,087 | 54.0 | +5.5 |
| Labour | 2 | +2 | 16.7 | 3 | 5 | 13.9 | 5,437 | 29.1 | +9.4 |
| Liberal Democrats | 0 | 0 | 0.0 | 1 | 1 | 2.8 | 2,427 | 13.0 | +11.4 |
| Green | 0 | 0 | 0.0 | 0 | 0 | 0.0 | 350 | 1.9 | +1.1 |
| UKIP | 0 | -2 | 0.0 | 0 | 0 | 0.0 | 264 | 1.4 | -26.4 |
| Independent | 0 | 0 | 0.0 | 0 | 0 | 0.0 | 112 | 0.6 | -1.0 |

== Ward results ==
=== Abbey North ===
Abbey North 2018
| Party | Candidate | Votes | % | ±% |
|---|---|---|---|---|
| Labour | Aiden Ramsey | 599 | 39.85 | +4.4 |
| Conservative | Leslie Poole | 407 | 27.08 | −9.22 |
| Liberal Democrats | Alan Knape | 312 | 20.76 | +20.76 |
| Independent | Nigel Carr | 112 | 7.45 | +7.45 |
| UKIP | Adam Collyer | 73 | 4.86 | −32.44 |
| Majority | | 192 | 12.77 | +11.77 |
| Turnout | | 1,503 | 28.01 | +2.81 |
| Labour gain from UKIP | | Swing | 18.42% | |

=== Abbey South ===
Abbey South 2018
| Party | Candidate | Votes | % | ±% |
|---|---|---|---|---|
| Conservative | Colin Morgan | 819 | 51.06 | +14.56 |
| Labour | Lewis Clarke | 670 | 41.77 | +22.77 |
| Liberal Democrats | John Butlin | 115 | 7.17 | +7.17 |
| Majority | | 149 | 9.29 | +6.29 |
| Turnout | | 1,604 | 34 | +0.62 |
| Conservative hold | | Swing | | |

=== Brixworth ===
Brixworth 2018
| Party | Candidate | Votes | % | ±% |
|---|---|---|---|---|
| Conservative | Kevin Parker | 1,163 | 65.04 | +13.14 |
| Labour | Stuart Coe | 428 | 23.94 | +21.94 |
| Liberal Democrats | Kathryn Purchase | 115 | 7.17 | +1.27 |
| Majority | | 735 | 41.11 | +11.61 |
| Turnout | | 1,788 | 32.71 | −0.88 |
| Conservative hold | | Swing | | |

=== Drayton ===
Drayton 2018
| Party | Candidate | Votes | % | ±% |
|---|---|---|---|---|
| Labour | Andrew Dabbs | 825 | 58.55 | +25.45 |
| Conservative | Timothy Wilson | 492 | 34.92 | +6.72 |
| Liberal Democrats | Zbigniew Chetnik | 92 | 6.53 | +4.03 |
| Majority | | 333 | 23.63 | +21.13 |
| Turnout | | 1,409 | 31.38 | −2.21 |
| Labour gain from UKIP | | Swing | 9.37% | |

=== Hill ===
Hill 2018
| Party | Candidate | Votes | % | ±% |
|---|---|---|---|---|
| Conservative | Peter Matten | 655 | 47.67 | +5.97 |
| Labour | Katie Thurston | 627 | 45.63 | +23.23 |
| Liberal Democrats | Simon Cockayne | 92 | 6.7 | +6.7 |
| Majority | | 28 | 2.04 | −4.96 |
| Turnout | | 1,374 | 28.92 | −0.65 |
| Conservative hold | | Swing | -8.63% | |

=== Long Buckby ===
Long Buckby 2018
| Party | Candidate | Votes | % | ±% |
|---|---|---|---|---|
| Conservative | Steve Osborne | 949 | 46.84 | +4.14 |
| Labour | Chris Myers | 766 | 37.81 | +15.91 |
| Liberal Democrats | Peter Ingles | 311 | 15.35 | +9.05 |
| Majority | | 183 | 9.03 | −5.37 |
| Turnout | | 2,026 | 37.19 | −5.81 |
| Conservative hold | | Swing | | |

=== Moulton ===
Moulton 2018
| Party | Candidate | Votes | % | ±% |
|---|---|---|---|---|
| Conservative | Michael Warren | 847 | 59.99 | +14.39 |
| Labour | Nicola Hudson | 299 | 21.18 | +2.88 |
| Green | Kevin White | 146 | 10.34 | +10.34 |
| Liberal Democrats | Sarah Richens | 120 | 8.5 | +8.5 |
| Majority | | 548 | 38.81 | +22.01 |
| Turnout | | 1,412 | 35.3% | −4.42 |
| Conservative hold | | Swing | | |

=== Spratton ===
Spratton 2018
| Party | Candidate | Votes | % | ±% |
|---|---|---|---|---|
| Conservative | Sarah Peck | 931 | 66.22 | +8.72 |
| Labour | Pete Coles | 299 | 21.18 | +7.08 |
| Liberal Democrats | Rupert Knowles | 120 | 8.53 | +8.53 |
| Green | Kathy Wickstead | 79 | 5.62 | +5.62 |
| Majority | | 694 | 49.36 | +8.31 |
| Turnout | | 1,406 | 35.37 | −5.68 |
| Conservative hold | | Swing | | |

=== Weedon ===
Weedon 2018
| Party | Candidate | Votes | % | ±% |
|---|---|---|---|---|
| Conservative | David Smith | 1,183 | 66.35 | +12.15 |
| Labour | Callum Batchelor | 354 | 19.85 | +6.65 |
| Liberal Democrats | Alan Faiers | 246 | 13.8 | +13.8 |
| Majority | | 829 | 46.49 | +19.99 |
| Turnout | | 1,783 | 35.15 | +6.51 |
| Conservative hold | | Swing | | |

=== Welford ===
Welford 2018
| Party | Candidate | Votes | % | ±% |
|---|---|---|---|---|
| Conservative | Cecile Irving-Swift | 854 | 67.51 | −6.29 |
| Labour | Sue Myers | 222 | 17.5 | −8.7 |
| Liberal Democrats | Stephen Deare | 189 | 14.94 | +14.94 |
| Majority | | 632 | 49.96 | +0.46 |
| Turnout | | 1,265 | 37.24 | −8.04 |
| Conservative hold | | Swing | | |

=== Woodford ===
Woodford 2018
| Party | Candidate | Votes | % | ±% |
|---|---|---|---|---|
| Conservative | Rupert Frost | 984 | 53.92 | +4.42 |
| Labour | Christine Fitchett | 347 | 19.01 | −0.49 |
| Liberal Democrats | Edward Judd | 178 | 9.75 | +9.75 |
| UKIP | Gary Denby | 191 | 10.47 | −20.03 |
| Green | Thomas Skillington | 125 | 6.85 | +6.85 |
| Majority | | 637 | 34.9 | +15.9 |
| Turnout | | 1,265 | 37.24 | +0.72 |
| Conservative hold | | Swing | | |

=== Yelvertoft ===
Yelvertoft 2018
| Party | Candidate | Votes | % | ±% |
|---|---|---|---|---|
| Conservative | Alan Chantler | 372 | 56.71 | −10.29 |
| Liberal Democrats | Stephen Pimm | 221 | 33.69 | +33.69 |
| Labour | Rio Knock | 63 | 9.6 | −1.6 |
| Majority | | 151 | 23.02 | −23.08 |
| Turnout | | 656 | 41.51 | −4.14 |
| Conservative hold | | Swing | -22% | |

== By-elections ==
Conservative councillor Fabienne Fraser-Allen (Brixworth) was forced to resign from the council due to non-attendance in June 2019. The seat was contested in a by-election on 18 July 2019. The term was due to end in 2020 but was extended one year due to the creation of West Northamptonshire Council.

Brixworth by-election, 18th July 2019 Term ends 7 May 2020
| Party | Candidate | Votes | % | ±% |
|---|---|---|---|---|
| Liberal Democrats | Jonathan Harris | 817 | 49.5 | 38.5% |
| Conservative | Lauren Harrington-Carter | 615 | 37.3 | −27.8% |
| Labour | Stuart Coe | 218 | 13.2 | −10.7% |
| Majority | | 202 | 12.2 | |
| Turnout | | 1663 | 30 | −2.7% |
| Liberal Democrats gain from Conservative | | Swing | 33% | |

Labour councillor Aiden Ramsey resigned as he moved away from the area after being elected in 2018. The seat was contested in a by-election on 24 October 2019. The term was due to end in 2022 but ended in 2021 due to the creation of West Northamptonshire Council.

Abbey North by-election, 24th October 2019 Term ends 5th May 2022
| Party | Candidate | Votes | % | ±% |
|---|---|---|---|---|
| Conservative | Lauren Harrington-Carter | 371 | 40.4 | 15.0% |
| Liberal Democrats | Alan Knape | 282 | 30.7 | 11.3% |
| Labour | Emily Carter | 265 | 28.9 | −14.7% |
| Majority | | 89 | 9.7 | |
| Turnout | | 930 | 17.5 | −10.5% |
| Conservative gain from Labour | | Swing | 14.9% | |
