= 2010 Daventry District Council election =

2010 UK local government election

- 6 May 2010

Results of the 2010 Daventry District Council election

The 2010 Daventry District Council election took place on 6 May 2010 to elect members of Daventry District Council in England. This was on the same day as other local elections.

== Election result ==
Daventry local election result 2010
| Party | Seats | Gains | Losses | Net gain/loss | Seats % | Votes % | Votes | +/− |
|---|---|---|---|---|---|---|---|---|
| Conservative | 12 | 0 | 0 | 0 | 92.3 | 52.1 | 16,612 | -9.2 |
| Liberal Democrats | 1 | 0 | 0 | 0 | 7.7 | 13.6 | 4,333 | -3.5 |
| Labour | 0 | 0 | 0 | 0 | 0 | 31.3 | 9,979 | +11.2 |
| English Democrat | 0 | 0 | 0 | 0 | 0 | 1.9 | 610 | New |
| Independent | 0 | 0 | 0 | 0 | 0 | 1.1 | 352 | New |

== Ward results ==
Abbey North *Two seats
| Party | Candidate | Votes | % | ±% |
|---|---|---|---|---|
| Conservative | Christopher Long | 1,708 | 36.6 | |
| Conservative | Ian Donachie | 1,359 | | |
| Liberal Democrats | Elliott Prince | 1,146 | 27.4 | |
| Labour | David James | 1,073 | 21.5 | |
| Labour | Elizabeth Ritchie | 728 | | |
| English Democrat | Gaynor Bennett-Spencer | 610 | 14.6 | |
| Majority | | | | |
| Turnout | | 3,941 | 58.24 | |
| Conservative hold | | Swing | | |

Barby and Kilsby
| Party | Candidate | Votes | % | ±% |
|---|---|---|---|---|
| Liberal Democrats | Brian Lomax | 1142 | 54.9 | 3.1 |
| Conservative | John Richards | 932 | 45.1 | −3.1 |
| Majority | | 210 | 9.8 | 6.2 |
| Turnout | | 2082 | 77.86 | |
| Liberal Democrats hold | | Swing | | |

Brixworth
| Party | Candidate | Votes | % | ±% |
|---|---|---|---|---|
| Conservative | Nicholas Bunting | 2,432 | 72.3 | −27.7 |
| Labour | Peter Luke | 865 | 27.7 | 27.7 |
| Majority | | 1,567 | 46.6 | −53.4 |
| Turnout | | 3,364 | 72.28 | |
| Conservative hold | | Swing | | |

Byfield
| Party | Candidate | Votes | % | ±% |
|---|---|---|---|---|
| Conservative | Robert Patchett | 740 | 63.6 | −36.4 |
| Liberal Democrats | Chris Salaman | 411 | 36.4 | 36.4 |
| Majority | | 329 | 28.2 | |
| Turnout | | 1,164 | 75.39 | |
| Conservative hold | | Swing | | |

Drayton
| Party | Candidate | Votes | % | ±% |
|---|---|---|---|---|
| Conservative | Leslie Poole | 1,426 | 50.9 | −6.0 |
| Labour | Wendy Randall | 1,316 | 49.1 | 6.0 |
| Majority | | 110 | 1.8 | −12 |
| Turnout | | 2,801 | 59.62 | |
| Conservative hold | | Swing | | |

Hill
| Party | Candidate | Votes | % | ±% |
|---|---|---|---|---|
| Conservative | Alan Hills | 1,275 | 51.3 | −17.1 |
| Labour | Nigel Carr | 661 | 26.6 | −5.0 |
| Liberal Democrats | Thomas Wash | 542 | 21.8 | 21.8 |
| Majority | | 614 | 24.7 | −12.1 |
| Turnout | | 2,483 | 60.8 | |
| Conservative hold | | Swing | | |

Long Buckby
| Party | Candidate | Votes | % | ±% |
|---|---|---|---|---|
| Conservative | Stephen Osborne | 1,302 | 51.0 | −16.3 |
| Labour | Christopher Myers | 551 | 21.6 | 4.3 |
| Liberal Democrats | Neil Farmer | 680 | 26.7 | 11.3 |
| Majority | | 622 | 24.4 | −25.6 |
| Turnout | | 2,549 | 74.9 | |
| Conservative hold | | Swing | | |

Moulton
| Party | Candidate | Votes | % | ±% |
|---|---|---|---|---|
| Conservative | Daniel Cribbin | 1,828 | 74.4 | |
| Labour | Maureen Luke | 584 | 25.6 | 25.6 |
| Majority | | 1244 | 50.6 | −49.4 |
| Turnout | | 2,457 | 72.01 | |
| Conservative hold | | Swing | | |

Spratton
| Party | Candidate | Votes | % | ±% |
|---|---|---|---|---|
| Conservative | Barry Frenchman | 684 | 60.8 | −39.2 |
| Labour | Frances Peacock | 266 | 23.6 | 23.6 |
| Liberal Democrats | Malcolm Adcock | 154 | 13.7 | 13.7 |
| Majority | | 418 | 37.2 | −62.8 |
| Turnout | | 1,125 | 77.16 | |
| Conservative hold | | Swing | | |

West Haddon and Guilsborough
| Party | Candidate | Votes | % | ±% |
|---|---|---|---|---|
| Conservative | John Millar | 944 | 67.3 | −17.3 |
| Labour | Sue Myers | 197 | 14.0 | −1.4 |
| Liberal Democrats | Liz Pym | 258 | 18.4 | 18.4 |
| Majority | | 686 | 48.9 | −20.3 |
| Turnout | | 1,403 | 77.05 | |
| Conservative hold | | Swing | | |

Woodford
| Party | Candidate | Votes | % | ±% |
|---|---|---|---|---|
| Conservative | Elizabeth Griffin | 1,067 | 54.0 | −46.0 |
| Labour | Alfonso Macari | 532 | 26.9 | 26.9 |
| Independent | Christine Fitchett | 352 | 17.8 | 17.8 |
| Majority | | 535 | 27.1 | −72.9 |
| Turnout | | 1,975 | 68.74 | |
| Conservative hold | | Swing | | |

Yelvertoft
| Party | Candidate | Votes | % | ±% |
|---|---|---|---|---|
| Conservative | Alan Chantler | 915 | 80.6 | 11.7 |
| Labour | Janet John | 206 | 19.4 | 19.4 |
| Majority | | 709 | 61.2 | 10.4 |
| Turnout | | 1,135 | 79.54 | |
| Conservative hold | | Swing | | |
