= Church Brampton =

Village in Northamptonshire, England

Coordinates: 52.2830°N 0.9533°W

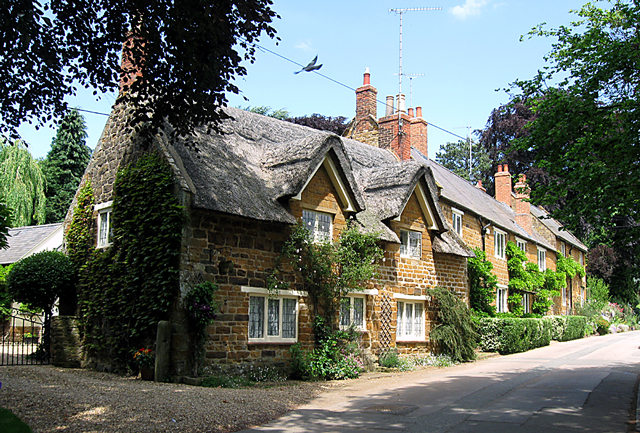
- Church Brampton cottages

- Location within Northamptonshire
- Population: 251 (2001)
- OS grid reference: SP7165
- Civil parish: Church with Chapel Brampton
- Unitary authority: West Northamptonshire
- Ceremonial county: Northamptonshire
- Region: East Midlands
- Country: England
- Sovereign state: United Kingdom
- Post town: Northampton
- Postcode district: NN6
- Dialling code: 01604
- Police: Northamptonshire
- Fire: Northamptonshire
- Ambulance: East Midlands
- UK Parliament: Daventry

Church Brampton is a village and former civil parish, now in the parish of Church with Chapel Brampton, in the West Northamptonshire unitary authority area of Northamptonshire, England. Together with nearby Chapel Brampton the two villages are known as The Bramptons. At the time of the 2001 census, the parish's population was 251 people. On 1 April 2009 the parish was abolished and merged with Chapel Brampton to form "Church with Chapel Brampton".

The villages name means 'Broom farm/settlement'.

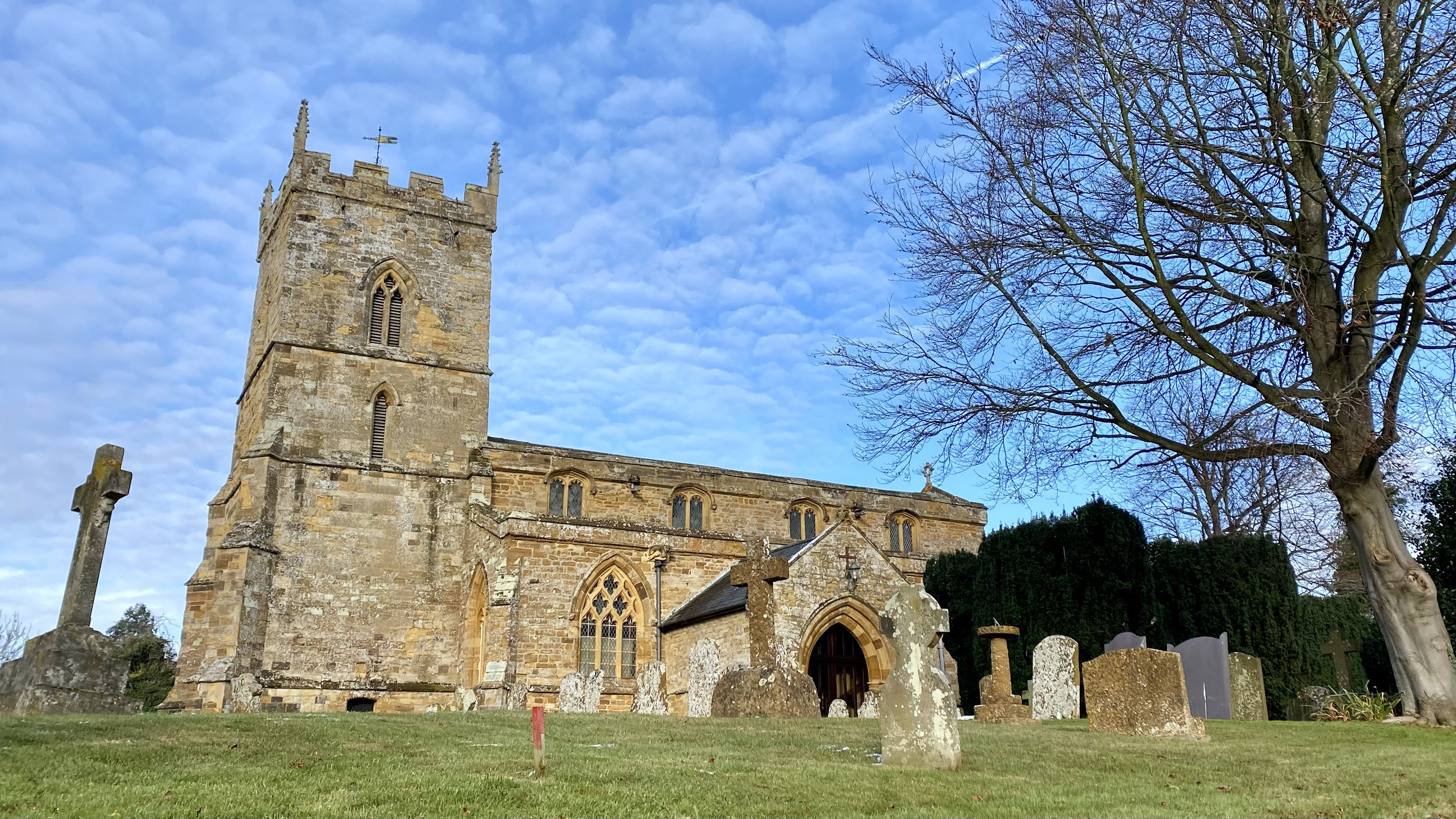
St Botolph's Church

Its church, St. Botolph's, dates back to the early 13th century. Just outside the village are two golf clubs, Church Brampton's Northamptonshire County Golf Course and the Brampton Heath golf course, a public course.
