= Large Scale Voluntary Transfer =

A Large Scale Voluntary Transfer (LSVT) is a term used in the United Kingdom to refer to the transfer of council housing to a housing association. For a Large Scale Voluntary Transfer to occur residents must be balloted. Supporters argue that transfer allows for greater investment to build more housing but critics argue that voluntary transfer amounts to back-door privatisation.

LSVT policies arose in the 1980s as part of the Conservative Government's programme of 'demunicipalisation', whereby the ownership, management, and repair of public housing was transferred from local government (or municipalities) to private contractors and landlords. Tenants of various council-housing blocks and estates had opposed the Government's attempts to impose a number of estate privatisations and in 1988 the law was changed to ensure that council estates could not be sold without a 'yes' vote from tenants in a ballot. Subsequently, a number of Conservative-led rural authorities started to circumvent these restrictions by creating private housing associations, since they could more easily win the assent of tenants to sell estates to these than to more obviously profit-driven owners. This strategy became the basis for the national LSVT scheme, and by 1997 LSVT had seen the sale of over 300,000 publicly owned dwellings to housing associations.
