= Daventry District =

Former local government district in England

Coordinates: 52.30°N 1.05°W

- Non-metropolitan district
- Shown within Northamptonshire
- Sovereign state: United Kingdom
- Constituent country: England
- Region: East Midlands
- Administrative county: Northamptonshire
- Admin. HQ: Daventry

Government
  - Type: Daventry District Council
  - Leadership: Alternative - Sec.31
  - Executive

Area
  - Total: 255.84 sq mi (662.62 km^{2})

Population (2019)
  - Total: 85,950
  - Density: 336.0/sq mi (129.7/km^{2})
- Time zone: UTC+0 (Greenwich Mean Time)
  - Summer (DST): UTC+1 (British Summer Time)
- ONS code: 34UC (ONS); E07000151 (GSS)
- Ethnicity: 96.5% White
- Website: daventrydc.gov.uk

Daventry District was a local government district in western Northamptonshire, England, from 1974 to 2021. The district was named after its main town of Daventry, where the council was based.

The district was created on 1 April 1974, under the Local Government Act 1972, by a merger of the historic municipal borough of Daventry with the Daventry Rural District and most of the Brixworth Rural District. The town of Daventry became an unparished area with charter trustees and remained so until 2003 when a civil parish was created, roughly corresponding with the boundaries of the former borough, so allowing Daventry to have its own town council.

== Abolition and replacement ==
In March 2018, following suspension of the county council arising from its becoming insolvent, due to financial and cultural mismanagement by the cabinet and officers, the then Secretary of State for Local Government, Sajid Javid, sent commissioner Max Caller into the council, who recommended the county council and all district and borough councils in the county be abolished, and replaced by two unitary authorities, one covering the West, and one the North of the county. These proposals were approved in April 2019. It meant that the districts of Daventry, Northampton and South Northamptonshire were merged to form a new unitary authority called West Northamptonshire, whilst the second unitary authority North Northamptonshire consists of Corby, East Northamptonshire, Kettering and Wellingborough districts. These new authorities came into being on 1 April 2021. Elections for the new authorities were due to be held on 7 May 2020, but were delayed due to the COVID-19 pandemic. These elections were later held on 6 May 2021.

== Demography ==
At the 2011 Census, the district had a population of 77,843, a little under a third of whom (25,026) lived in the town of Daventry. Other significant settlements included Brixworth, Long Buckby and Weedon Bec. The rest of the district was predominantly rural.

=== Ethnicity ===
Ethnic Group	1991		2001		2011	
Ethnic Group	Number	%	Number	%	Number	%
White: Total	62,256	99%	70,398	98%	75,123	96.5%
White: British	–	–	68,788	95.8%	72,448	93.1%
White: Irish	–	–	571		509	
White: Gypsy or Irish Traveller	–	–	–	–	54	
White: Other	–	–	1,039		2,112	
Asian or Asian British: Total	333	0.5%	478	0.7%	1,183	1.5%
Asian or Asian British: Indian	161		320		551	
Asian or Asian British: Pakistani	38		85		172	
Asian or Asian British: Bangladeshi	0		12		55	
Asian or Asian British: Chinese	82		128		151	
Asian or Asian British: Other Asian	52		61		254	
Black or Black British: Total	333	0.5%	239	0.3%	481	0.6%
Black or Black British: Caribbean	82		176		211	
Black or Black British: African	23		50		213	
Black or Black British: Other Black	70		13		57	
Mixed or British Mixed: Total	–	–	522	0.7%	971	1.2%
Mixed: White and Black Caribbean	–	–	183		381	
Mixed: White and Black African	–	–	45		98	
Mixed: White and Asian	–	–	181		302	
Mixed: Other Mixed	–	–	113		190	
Other: Total	92	0.1%	73	0.1%	85	0.1%
Other: Arab	–	–	–	–	7	
Other: Any other ethnic group	92		73		78	
Total	62,856	100%	71,838	100%	77,843	100%

== Housing ==
In 2007, the Council housing stock owned by the council was transferred to Daventry & District Housing Ltd., a specially formed registered social landlord, under a Large Scale Voluntary Transfer. A subsequent dispute about the provisions made in the transfer contract for employees' pensions led to a legal case heard in the England and Wales Court of Appeal concerning the legal doctrines of mutual or unilateral mistake.

== Settlements and parishes ==
Civil parishes of Daventry District upon its creation in 1974

The following changes to civil parishes took place during the district's history:

- 25 June 2001: Stowe Nine Churches renamed Stowe IX Churches.
- 1 April 2003: Daventry becomes a parish again.
- 1 April 2009: Church with Chapel Brampton created by the merger of Church Brampton and Chapel Brampton.
- 1 April 2020: Harlestone Manor created out of Harlestone.
- Althorp, Arthingworth, Ashby St Ledgers
- Badby, Barby, Boughton, Braunston, Brington, Brixworth, Brockhall, Byfield
- Canons Ashby, Chapel Brampton, Charwelton, Church Brampton, Church Stowe, Clay Coton Clipston, Cold Ashby, Coton, Cottesbrooke, Creaton, Crick
- Daventry, Dodford, Draughton
- East Farndon, East Haddon, Elkington, Everdon
- Farthingstone, Fawsley, Flore
- Great Brington, Great Oxendon, Guilsborough
- Hanging Houghton, Hannington, Harlestone, Haselbech, Hellidon, Holcot, Holdenby, Hollowell
- Kelmarsh, Kilsby
- Lamport, Lilbourne, Little Brington, Long Buckby, Lower Catesby
- Maidwell, Marston Trussell, Moulton
- Naseby, Newnham, Norton
- Old, Overstone
- Pitsford, Preston Capes
- Ravensthorpe
- Scaldwell, Sibbertoft, Spratton, Stanford-on-Avon, Staverton, Sulby
- Teeton, Thornby
- Upper Catesby, Upper Stowe
- Walgrave, Watford, Weedon Bec, Welford, Welton, West Haddon, Whilton, Winwick, Woodford Halse
- Yelvertoft

== Political control ==
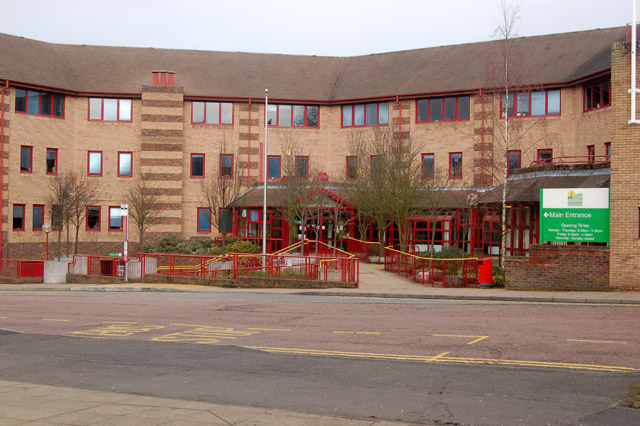
Daventry Civic Centre, the headquarters of the former Daventry District Council. Built 1980s.

See Daventry District Council elections

== See also ==
- Grade I listed buildings in Daventry District
- Grade II* listed buildings in Daventry District
