= List of fictional butlers =

A list of fictional butlers or related characters:

Butler	Work	Year introduced	Note
A
Afanasii Ziukin	The majordomo of Grand Duke George Alexandrovich in The Coronation by Boris Akunin	2009	
Agni	The servant/butler to Prince Soma in the manga Kuroshitsuji (Black Butler)	2007	
Akiharu Hino	A student at Hakureiryō Academy, a school for training servants-to-be, in the anime, manga, and light novel, Ladies versus Butlers!	2006	
Brian Albumen	The servant/valet to Quadruple Professor Adonis Cnut (Rik Mayall) from the ITV TV series Believe Nothing	2002	
Alfred	Nikolas Cassadine's butler in the TV series General Hospital	2006	
Alfred	Mayflowers' murderous butler in Hudson Hawk movie	1991	
Alfred Pennyworth	Bruce Wayne's butler and father figure in the DC Comics universe	1943	
Alfred	Gex's turtle butler, a parody of Alfred Pennyworth	1999	
Alfredo	Nanette Manoir's butler in Angela Anaconda	1999	
Andrew	In the film Overboard	1987	
Andrew Martin	A robotic/android butler in Isaac Asimov's novella The Bicentennial Man and the film based on it	1976	
Archer	Samuel and Elizabeth Daily's butler in The Woman In Black	1983	
Aurthour	Guardian and Butler to Equius Zahhak in Homestuck		
B
Banks	Simon Peel's butler in the British sitcom Never the Twain	1981	
Barkley	In the film The Toy	1982	
Barrymore/Barryman	Butler to Sir Henry Baskerville in The Hound of the Baskervilles	1901	
Bates	In Top Hat (1935)	1935	
Bautista	In Rigoberto Picaporte		
Sebastian Beach	Lord Emsworth's butler at Blandings Castle, from the works of P. G. Wodehouse	1915	
Beecham	Max's assistant from the film Who Is Killing the Great Chefs of Europe?, portrayed by Madge Ryan	1978	
Beeker	From the Phule novels by Robert Asprin	1990	
Lynn Belvedere	From the novel Belvedere, the adapted feature film and its sequels, and the TV series Mr. Belvedere	1947	
Benson DuBois	Butler to the Tates on Soap and household manager to Governor Gatling on the spinoff series Benson	1977	
Thomas Benson	Butler and assistant to Wolf Frankenstein	1939	
Bernard	The Osborns' butler from the Spider-Man film series	2002	
Bertram Winkle	The butler to the Ross family in Jessie	2011	
Bill Tremblay	The butler of the Where's Wabi League		
Billy Swan	The butler of Bloodstone family in the Marvel Cinematic Universe	2022	
Edmund Blackadder	The butler to the Prince of Wales in Blackadder the Third	1987	
Bob	In Bob the Butler	2005	
Bootler	Butler to Lady Bow from the video game Paper Mario	2000	
Brabinger	Family retainer of the fforbes-Hamiltons from the BBC TV series To the Manor Born	1979	
Brace	Servant to James Delaney of the historic drama series Taboo	2017	
Brackett	Butler to Lord Belborough of the children's television show Chigley	1969	
Fritz Brenner	Nero Wolfe's servant	1934	
Brewster	The Cranleighs' butler in Doctor Who – Black Orchid	1982	
Birmingham Brown	Butler/chauffeur of Charlie Chan in the 1940s film serial	1944	
Brunton	Butler to the Musgrave family in "The Adventure of the Musgrave Ritual"	1893	
Mervyn Bunter	Valet of Lord Peter Wimsey in several novels and short-stories by Dorothy Leigh Sayers (see also Batman (military))	1923	
Domovoi Butler	From the Artemis Fowl novels	2001	
Geoffrey Butler	In the Fresh Prince of Bel-Air	1990	
Juliet Butler	From the Artemis Fowl novels	2001	
The Butler	In The Adventures of Jimmy Neutron, a holographic butler that Jimmy makes, later destroyed when Jimmy's dad removes the power pack, causing an explosion	2003	
The Butler	Butler to No. 2 in The Prisoner	1967	
Butler Livers	Butler from the game Brave Fencer Musashi	1998	
Butterscotch Butler	Prince Gumball's butler, the gender-swapped version of Peppermint Butler in Adventure Time	2016	
Mr. Butlertron	From Clone High	2002	
Butt-ler	Betrayus' butler and the brother of Dr. Buttocks in Pac-Man and the Ghostly Adventures, named for his anus-like forehead.	2013	
C
Charles Carson	Butler to the Crawley family in the ITV series Downton Abbey	2010	
Cadbury	The Riches' butler who attends to the Rich Estate in the Richie Rich franchise	1953	
Carter	Butler to Sir Wilfrid Robarts in "The Witness for the Prosecution"	1925	
Cavendish	Butler to Sir Hugo Drax in James Bond movie Moonraker	1979	
Chadwick	Butler to Sir Humphrey Pengallan	1939	
Chives	British butler to Louis Stevens in Even Stevens, episode 43, "Gutter Queen"	2002	
Chives	Loyal butler to Raef Halleber from the UK TV series ChuckleVision	2008	
Coleman	From Trading Places	1983	
Collins	Marcus Scarman's ill-fated butler in Doctor Who: Pyramids of Mars	1975	
Chunjin	Undercover Communist valet to Raymond Shaw in The Manchurian Candidate	1959	
Claude Faustus	Butler for Alois Trancy of the Trancy Household in Kuroshitsuji II	2010	
Clorica	Butler to the avatar in Rune Factory 4	2012	
Codsworth	Robotic butler to the Sole Survivor in Fallout 4	2015	
Cogsworth	Majordomo for the Beast in Beauty and the Beast	1991	
Crichton	Butler to Lord Loam, from J. M. Barrie's The Admirable Crichton	1902	
Cube	From Princess Maker and Petite Princess Yucie	1993	
D
Darach	Butler of later Elite Four member Caitlin in the Pokémon franchise	2008	
Mr. Deeds	A paranormal butler summoned by ringing a silver hand bell (SCP-662). Is in the custody of the SCP Foundation along with his former employer, Lord Blackwood (SCP-1867).	2009	
Desmond	From the Rip Kirby comics	1946	
Didit	Butler in the Clue VCR Mystery Game	1985	
Dobby	House-elf in literary saga of Harry Potter	1998	
Drake	Oliver Warbucks' butler in Annie		
Duckworth	Scrooge McDuck's butler/chauffeur on Ducktales (Battista in the Italian comics)	1987	
E
Edgar	Butler to Adelaide Bonfamille in The Aristocats	1970	
8D8	8D-series smelter droid that was Jabba the Hutt's chief of Cyborg Operations in Return of the Jedi. Became the majordomo of Boba Fett in The Book of Boba Fett	1983	
Emilio Lopez	Butler to Preston Blake in Mr. Deeds	2002	
English	Butler to Kid Notorious in Kid Notorious	2003	
F
Ferguson	Butler to Frasier Crane in Frasier episode "Taking Liberties"	2000	
Claude Fitzwilliam	Butler to Victoria Woodworth in Fitzwilly	1967	
Fodor	Butler to the Mortevals in Boris Karloff Mexican film House of Evil	1968	
Bib Fortuna	Twi'lek majordomo of Jabba the Hutt, debuted in Return of the Jedi	1983	
Franz	Butler to the Von Trapp family in The Sound of Music	1959	
Mr. French	Uncle Bill's butler in the 1960s US sitcom Family Affair	1966	
Frith	Butler to the De Winter family in Rebecca	1938	
G
Genji Ronoue	From Umineko no Naku Koro ni	2007	
Geoffrey Butler	From The Fresh Prince of Bel-Air	1990	
George (billed as Manservant)	Manservant to Damien Thorn in Omen III: The Final Conflict	1981	
George Costanza	Briefly became Frank Costanza's butler in The Handicap Spot due to payment of a wrecked car	1989	
Giles	Ava Jerome's British butler at Wyndemere Castle replacing Alfred during her ownership of Wyndemere Castle on General Hospital	2023	
Giles	From the murder mystery reality-competition series Whodunnit?	2013	
Giovanni Bertuccio	Butler/steward to The Count of Monte Cristo	1844	
Godfrey	Butler to the Bullock family in My Man Godfrey	1935	
Delbert Grady	From Stephen King's The Shining	1977	
Grovely	Butler to Montana Max of Tiny Toon Adventures	1990	
Gudgeon	Butler to the Angkatell family in Agatha Christie's The Hollow	1946	
H
Hargreaves	Butler to Harrison Chase in the Doctor Who serial The Seeds of Doom	1976	
Hayate Ayasaki	From Hayate no Gotoku	2004	
Hawkins	From The Contest Kid and the Big Prize by Barbara Brooks Wallace	1977	
Heathcliff	The butler of Fred and his family from Big Hero 6	2014	
Hein	Geese Howard's butler in The King of Fighters XIV	2016	
Heinz	The Matthews' Chinese butler in Daniel Pinkwater's The Snarkout Boys and the Avocado of Death, a false identity used alternately by Wallace and Heinrich Nussbaum, or possibly just a butler who uses the Nussbaums as false identities	1982	
Herbert	From Justice Squad		
Hermann	The butler to Count Scarlioni/Scaroth in the Doctor Who story "City of Death"	1979	
Higgins	From the 1951 radio comedy It's Higgins, Sir, recreated as the television show Our Man Higgins in 1962	1951	
Jonathan Higgins	Majordomo in Magnum, P.I.	1980	
Hillary	The butler of Lara Croft in Lara Croft: Tomb Raider and Lara Croft Tomb Raider: The Cradle of Life	2001	
Robert Hiller	Dorothy's butler in Two's Company	1975	
Hirsh	The butler to WKRP owner Lillian Carlson	1981	
Hobson	In Arthur and Arthur 2: On the Rocks	1981	
Mr. Homn	Lwaxana Troi's manservant in Star Trek: The Next Generation	1987	
Hovis	From Catscratch	2005	
Angus Hudson	From Upstairs, Downstairs	1971	
I
Ianto Jones	From Torchwood (while his role could be considered General Support, he considers that the services he provides make him "like a butler")	2006	
Ingmar	The butler of the eponymous character in Freakazoid!	1995	
Igor	Butler to Count Duckula (animated series)	1988	
Igor	The hunchbacked assistant of Dr. Frederick Frankenstein in Young Frankenstein	1974	
Ishizaki	Karin Kanzuki's rotund, muscular butler in Street Fighter Alpha 3	1998	
J
Jack	Butler of businessman Justin Hammer in Iron Man 2	2010	
Jacob	The unisex butler in all the La Cage Aux Folles films	1978	
Jake	A witch disguised as the Wilhern family's butler in Penelope	2008	
Jakob	The avatar's butler in Fire Emblem Fates	2015	
James	Butler to Miss Sophie in TV sketch Dinner for One	1963	
Jamesir Bensonmum	Blind butler to Lionel Twain in the movie Murder by Death	1976	
James Twelvetrees	The pompous footman from You Rang, M'Lord?	1988	
Edwin Jarvis	From Marvel Comics' Avengers series	1964	
Jeepers	Bob Hope's butler in Paramount's Never Say Die	1939	
Jeeves	A valet to Bertie Wooster from the Jeeves stories by P. G. Wodehouse, adapted for UK television as Jeeves and Wooster, and inspiration for the name of the Internet search engine known as Ask Jeeves.com.	1915	
Jeeves	The Colonel's butler from the adventure game Colonel's Bequest	1989	
Jeeves	Robotic butler (and former warbot) from the Liaden Universe novels	1989	
Jodot	The count's butler and chief assassin from Lupin III: The Castle of Cagliostro	1979	
Joost	Olivier B. Bommel's loyal butler in the comic series Tom Poes	1942	
Joseph	Butler to Alexander Sebastian in Notorious	1946	
Jenkins	Robot servant of Webster family in City by Clifford D. Simak	1952	
Jenkins	Butler of Daphne Blake in the long-running animated TV series Scooby-Doo	1989	
Jennings	The butler in the 2001 film Gosford Park, directed by Robert Altman	2001	
John Doe AKA Shelly de Killer	From Phoenix Wright: Ace Attorney − Justice for All	2002	
K
Cato (or "Kato")	Inspector Clouseau's butler and sparring partner from the original Pink Panther franchise; spelled with a "k" in A Shot in the Dark (1964)	1964	
Kato	Britt Reid's valet in the Green Hornet	1936	
Karun Patel	The valet of Eternal actor Kingo in the Marvel Cinematic Universe	2021	
Klahadore (real name Kuro)	Butler to Kaya in the manga One Piece	1997	
Klein Seiben	Butler to the Schnee family in RWBY.	2016	
Kyrano	Manservant to Jeff Tracy in Thunderbirds	1965	
L
Lane	Manservant to Algernon Moncrieff in Oscar Wilde's The Importance of Being Earnest	1895	
Lawrence	Doctor Nefarious' butler in the Ratchet & Clank video game series	2004	
Ling Qisa	In Hayate the Combat Butler (TV series)	2011	Based on Hayate Ayasaki
Lord Rogers	Head butler to Queen Uberta in The Swan Princess	1994	
Lucas (or Lucan)	A knight who served as King Arthur's butler in Le Morte d'Arthur	1485	
Lurch	In The Addams Family	1938	
M
Magersfontein Lugg	In the Albert Campion novels, written by Margery Allingham	1930	
Martin	From The Parent Trap remake	1998	
Max von Mayerling	Butler and former husband to Norma Desmond in Sunset Boulevard	1950	
Max	From Cats Don't Dance; a parody of Max von Mayerling.	1997	
Max	From the TV show Hart to Hart	1979	
Merriman	Butler to John Worthing in Oscar Wilde's The Importance of Being Earnest	1895	
Merry	Butler to Kaya in the manga One Piece	1997	
Meadows	From Chuck Jones' animated short The Aristo-Cat	1943	
Meadows	Butler to the Stanley family from The Pirate Movie	1982	
N
Nestor	Captain Haddock's butler at Marlinspike Hall, in Hergé's comic book series The Adventures of Tintin	1943	
Mr. Nettlebed	From Rosamunde Pilcher's novel Coming Home	1995	
Nick Nack	Butler to Francisco Scaramanga in The Man with the Golden Gun	1974	
Niles	In The Nanny	1993	
Nimrod	Neanderthal butler in the Doctor Who tale Ghost Light	1989	
Norman Burg	Roger Smith's butler in anime television series The Big O	1999	
O
Oha	Servant of the Zamundi royal family in Coming to America	1988	
Orto K. Gotchi	Dudley's butler in Street Fighter III	1997	
P
Aloysius Parker	Lady Penelope Creighton-Ward's butler in Thunderbirds	1965	
Passepartout	The valet to Mr. Phileas Fogg in the novel Around the World in Eighty Days by Jules Verne	1873	
Paul Moriyama	Momoka Nishizawa's butler in Sgt. Frog	1999	
Peppermint Butler	Princess Bubblegum's butler in Adventure Time	2010	
Mr. Pitcher	Butler to Archibald Craven in The Secret Garden	1910	
Pfister	Butler in Haunted Honeymoon	1986	
Plimpton	Butler to Dr. Wilfred Glendon in Werewolf of London	1935	
Poole	Butler to Dr. Henry Jekyll in Strange Case of Dr Jekyll and Mr Hyde	1886	
Pork	Butler and valet to Gerald O'Hara in Gone with the Wind	1936	
Praiseworthy	Jeeves-like butler in the children's novel By the Great Horn Spoon! by Sid Fleischman	1963	
R
Oeznik	The butler of the Zemo House in Marvel Cinematic Universe	2021	
Ramsley	From The Haunted Mansion	2003	
Raunce	Succeeds to the position from footman when Eldon the Butler dies, in the novel Loving by Henry Green	1945	
Randolph	The Cleary's Butler from Wedding Crashers	2005	
Raymond	Butler and valet to Charles Foster Kane in Citizen Kane	1941	
Reginald	The Quartermaine family's former butler in the TV series General Hospital	1992	
Riff-Raff	Butler and handyman to Dr. Frank-N-Furter in The Rocky Horror Show and the film adaptation The Rocky Horror Picture Show	1973	
Riffael Raffit	Butler to Earl Cain	1991	
Rihito Shibata	Mei Shinonome's butler from Mei-chan no Shitsuji	2006	
Rochester	Butler to Jack Benny on the Jack Benny Show	1937	
Rogers	Husband of Ethel Rogers and suspect in Agatha Christie's And Then There Were None	1939	
Rowen J. Ilbert	Butler for the Sharil family in the video game Tales of Xillia	2011	
Marmaduke Ruggles	In Harry Leon Wilson's Ruggles of Red Gap and its adaptations, "lost" by the English Earl of Burnstead to Egbert Floud in a poker game in Paris and moved to the frontier town of Red Gap, Washington	1914	
Ruthven	Butler to Melrose Plant in the Richard Jury detective series written by Martha Grimes (pronounced Rivven)	1981	
S
Sam	Butler and best friend to Rick Blaine in Casablanca	1942	
Sam	Butler to the Amberson family in The Magnificent Ambersons	1918	
Samwise Gamgee	Gardener, companion, and manservant to Frodo Baggins in The Lord of the Rings	1954	
Saturnin	Butler/servant in Zdenek Jirotka's eponymous novell and eponymous film	1942	
Sandor	Butler/servant to Countess Marya Zaleska in Dracula's Daughter	1936	
Saunders	The butler who replaced Benson DuBois on Soap	1980	
Sebastian	Lili's butler in Tekken 5: Dark Resurrection	2005	
Sebastian Michaelis	Butler to Ciel Phantomhive in the manga Kuroshitsuji	2006	
Seecombe	Butler to the Ambrose family in My Cousin Rachel	1951	
Serrano	Valet to the king Louis I of Spain in La vida breve	2025	
Shakelford	From Justice Squad and The Critic		
Shinobu	Shiori Hongo's Butler from Mei-chan no Shitsuji	2006	
Charlie Silversmith	Butler of Deverill Hall in The Mating Season	1949	
Simonides	Butler to Judah Ben-Hur	1880	
Smethells	Steward for the player in Titanic: Adventure Out of Time	1996	
Smithers	Veronica Lodge's butler in the Archie comics	1957	
Waylon Smithers	Assistant to Mr. Burns from The Simpsons	1989	
Agador Spartacus	Butler in The Birdcage	1996	
Spencer	The Hartfords' butler in Power Rangers Operation Overdrive; he is also one of the Rangers' mentors along with Andrew Hartford	2007	
Septimus Spratt	The butler to Violet Crawley, the Dowager Countess of Grantham, in the ITV series Downton Abbey	2013	
Standish	Butler to T. Herman Zweibel, editor of The Onion		
Stephen Warren	Butler to the Calvin Candie in Django Unchained	2011	
Stevens	In Remains of the Day	1989	
Alf Stokes	Butler to the Meldrum family in You Rang, M'Lord?	1988	
Subaru Konoe	The female butler of Kanade Suzutsuki who is disguised as a male in the Mayo Chiki! anime, manga and light novel	2009	
T
Tanaka	The former head butler of the Phantomhive household in the manga Black Butler.	2006	
Thomas	Butler to the Lord family in The Philadelphia Story	1939	
Thomas Barrow	Butler to the Crawley family in the ITV series Downton Abbey	2015	
Tobias Butler	A recurring character of both Books and TV series Miss Fisher's Murder Mysteries.	1989	
V
Valkenhayn R. Hellsing	The butler to the Alucard family in the BlazBlue videogame series	2008	
Various members of the Igor family	In the Discworld novels	1998	
Vishnal	Butler to the avatar in Rune Factory 4	2012	
Volkanon	Butler to the avatar in Rune Factory 4	2012	
W
Wadsworth	In the movie Clue	1985	
Wadsworth	The robotic butler to the Lone Wanderer in Fallout 3.	2008	
Walter C. Dornez	From the manga Hellsing (and subsequent anime) by Kouta Hirano	1997	
Wallace	The Ridgemeres' butler in the Only Fools and Horses episode "A Touch of Glass"	1982	
Wilkins	Butler to Mr. and Mrs. Topper in Topper	1926	
Willikins	Samuel Vimes' butler in the Discworld novels by Terry Pratchett	1993	
Winston	The Foxworths' butler and chauffeur from Oliver & Company	1988	
Winston	The Griplings' butler and chauffeur from As Told By Ginger	2000	
Winston "Jeeves" Smith	Butler of Lara Croft in the video game series Tomb Raider	1997	
Winter	Butler to Sam Flusky in Under Capricorn	1937	
Wintergreen	Slade Wilson's butler and confidant in the DC Comics universe	1980	
Woodhouse	Sterling Archer's mistreated valet in the comedy series Archer, who formerly worked for Mallory Archer.	2009	
Wong	Valet, bodyguard, and servant to Doctor Strange in the Marvel Comics universe.	1963	
Y
You There	Butler to Bender's Uncle Vladimir in Futurama episode "The Honking"	2000	
Z
Zazu	The majordomo to king Mufasa in the film The Lion King	1994	

== See also ==
- List of famous fictional valets
