= Len Darnell =

English footballer (1905–1968)

Personal information
- Full name: Leonard Darnell
- Date of birth: 14 September 1905
- Place of birth: Irchester, England
- Date of death: 1968 (aged 62–63)
- Position: Wing-half

Senior career*
Years	Team	Apps	(Gls)
1924–1925	Rushden Town		
1925–1930	West Bromwich Albion	57	(0)
1930–1934	Reading	85	(4)
1934–1935	Carlisle United	7	(0)
Total		149	(4)
- * Club domestic league appearances and goals

Leonard Darnell (14 September 1905 – 1968) was an English footballer who played in the Football League for Carlisle United, Reading and West Bromwich Albion.
