= Miroslav Macek =

Czech politician and author (1944–2024)

Personal details
- Born: 7 December 1944 Litomyšl, Protectorate of Bohemia and Moravia
- Died: 1 May 2024 (aged 79) Zábřeh, Czech Republic
- Party: OF (1989–1991); ODS (1991–2024)
- Spouses: Alexandra (div. 2001) Jana Blochová (m. 2001; div. 2009) Petra Hrochová Macková (m. 2015)
- Children: Miroslav; Alexandra
- Education: Palacký University Olomouc
- Profession: Dentist

Miroslav Macek (7 December 1944 – 1 May 2024) was a Czech politician and writer. He served as a deputy prime minister of Czechoslovakia.

== Life and career ==
Macek was born in Litomyšl, Protectorate of Bohemia and Moravia. In May 2006 Macek made international news when, coming from behind, he struck the Minister of Health David Rath at a dentists' conference, accusing him of having insulted his wife (after Rath had publicly stated that Macek had married his wife for money).

Macek was a member of Mensa International, being considered the first member from behind the Iron Curtain. He stated that he had become a member in 1980.

In 2017, he published his novel Saturnin se vrací (Saturnin Returns), a sequel to Zdeněk Jirotka's acclaimed novel, Saturnin.

Macek died on 1 May 2024, at the age of 79.

== Books by Macek ==
- Jak se stát labužníkem (2004)
- Saturnin se vrací (2017)
