= Richard Jury =

- Richard Jury character
- First appearance: The Man With a Load of Mischief
- Created by: Martha Grimes
- Portrayed by: Fritz Karl

In-universe information
- Gender: Male
- Occupation: Police detective
- Nationality: British

Richard Jury is a fictional character in a series of mystery novels written by Martha Grimes.

Initially a chief inspector, later a superintendent, Jury is invariably assisted in his cases by Melrose Plant, a British aristocrat who has given up his titles, and by his hypochondriacal but dependable sergeant, Alfred Wiggins. Many of the novels include Divisional Commander Brian Macalvie of the Devon and Cornwall Constabulary. In addition, there is a recurring ensemble of background characters.

== Description ==
Jury is melancholic and moody. He was orphaned as a young child in the Second World War (his father, an RAF pilot, was lost in combat, his mother died in the German bombing of London); he lived briefly with his uncle's family but the uncle also died and Jury spent most of his childhood in an unpleasant group home. Although he is handsome, kind, and attractive to women, he is unlucky in love (spectacularly so — one of the novels involves the death of a woman with whom he has a sudden, passionate affair). His good looks and 6' 2" height - including an attractive smile, gray eyes and chestnut hair - and the ease with which he wins the hearts of women and children arouse envy in his wealthy and cultured friend, Plant, but neither man is successful in romantic relationships.

== Age ==
Jury was five years old when his mother died in "the last German bombing of London". The heaviest bombardment of London occurred during the Blitz, 1941–1942, but the Germans targeted London with V1s and V2s as late as March, 1945. The books are set in the present day, and Jury gives his age as 43 in The Dirty Duck, which was published in 1984, so he must have been born in 1940 or 1941. In "Dust" (published in 2007), he was not 62, however, as Ms. Grimes long ago opted to keep him (and Plant) under 50 by slowing down the fictional time between cases.

== Recurring characters ==
In addition to reccurring characters, a recurring theme is young children that outwit adults, and who are essential to the plot. EG, see https://groveatlantic.com/book/knowledge-the/ where a young lady (?12) outwits adults to an absurd extent

Recurring characters in the series include his neighbors in his Islington flat, personnel at his New Scotland Yard office, and friends of Plant in the Northamptonshire village of Long Piddleton.

=== Islington neighbors ===
- Mrs. Wassermann, resident of the "garden" (basement) flat, a Holocaust survivor who depends on Jury to reassure her that she is safe. (Jury lives in the flat above Mrs. Wasserman.)
- Stan Keeler, a jazz/blues guitarist living in the flat above Jury, often away from home.
- Carole-anne Palutski, a very attractive young woman with copper-colored hair. Carole-Anne lives in the top flat, above Stan, and looks after both Stan's and Jury's flats when they are absent, as well as Stan's dog, Stone. Jury's feelings for her are paternal, but occasionally conflicted, as evidenced by a rather long and warm Christmas kiss. Carole-anne has humorously proprietary romantic feelings for Jury.
- Stone, Stan Keeler's good-natured caramel-colored Labrador. Carol-anne takes care of Stone most of the time when Stan Keeler is away from home

=== New Scotland Yard ===
- Detective Sergeant Alfred Wiggins.
- Chief Superintendent Racer, Jury's pompous and irascible superior.
- Cyril, a highly intelligent cat who haunts Racer's office.
- Fiona Clingmore, Racer's secretary and Jury's ally, along with Cyril, in irritating Racer.

=== Long Piddleton ===
- Melrose Plant, once Lord Ardry, the Earl of Caverness. His ancestral home is called Ardry End.
- Ruthven and Martha, husband and wife, manservant and housekeeper, respectively, at Ardry End for many years.
- "Lady" Agatha Ardry, Plant's intrusive aunt and bane of his existence.
- Marshall Trueblood, an antiques dealer, of flamboyant dress and manner, but possibly that is an affectation for customers who "expect" that behavior.
- Diane DeMorney, single, wealthy, and attractive, but only a friend to Jury and Plant. She knows nothing about astrology, but writes a column on the topic for the local paper. She has porcelain skin and black hair, and is always perfectly coiffed and dressed in combinations of black and white.
- Vivian Rivington, a love interest for Jury, but she is (somewhat secretly) in love with Plant. She was for years engaged to an Italian count.
- Joanna Lewes, the best-selling author of potboiler romances. Her nickname is Joanna the Mad (“Maddy” to Marshall Trueblood) because her dead husband's name was Philip].
- Dick Scroggs, publican, owner of the Jack and Hammer, where Plant and other denizens of Long Piddleton gather.
- Mrs. Withersby, charwoman at the Jack and Hammer, who spends most of her time sleeping by the fire and cadging drinks from the regulars.
- Trevor Sly, owner of the Blue Parrot, a less-frequented pub.
- Theo Wrenn Browne, pompous owner of the local bookstore, disliked by Plant, frequent ally of Agatha.
- Ada Crisp, a mild local shopkeeper, frequent adversary to Browne's hopes of expanding his store.

=== Elsewhere ===
- Polly Praed, a mystery writer with violet eyes. Melrose Plant has a long-standing crush on her, and she, in turn, is infatuated with Jury.
- Sarah Malloy, Jury's cousin. At one point she was his only living relative, but she is deceased in later titles. She lived in Newcastle with her husband, Brendan, and four children.
- Ashley and "White Ellie" Cripps, an unconventional London family with many children. White Ellie is so named because she is as large (and, her husband thinks, as useless) as the proverbial white elephant.
- Bea Slocum, lives with the Crippses and is Melrose Plant's elusive love interest. Helped Jury and Plant solve the mystery of a stolen painting. Bea is a talented painter and her portrait of Melrose showcases both her talent and his elusiveness.
- Ellen Taylor, a New York writer who lives in Baltimore, and another elusive love interest of Melrose Plant. Jury, Plant, and Wiggins travel to Baltimore to solve the mysterious death of a young woman.
- Jenny Kennington, Jury's elusive love interest, and later, Plant's. Jury helped her recover a stolen necklace and later helped clear her of a murder she didn't commit.

== Adaptations ==
The Man With a Load of Mischief, Help the Poor Struggler and The Deer Leap were filmed for German and Austrian television under the titles Der Tote im Pub (The Dead Man in the Pub) (2013), Mord im Nebel (Murder in the Fog) (2015), Inspektor Jury spielt Katz und Maus (Inspector Jury Plays Cat-and-mouse) (2017), and Inspektor Jury: Der Tod des Harlekins (The Death of the Harlequin) (2018). Fritz Karl starred as Jury, with Götz Schubert as Plant and Katharina Thalbach as "Lady" Agatha Ardry.
