= Melrose Plant =

- Richard Jury character
- First appearance: The Man With a Load of Mischief
- Created by: Martha Grimes
- Portrayed by: Götz Schubert

In-universe information
- Gender: Male
- Occupation: Amateur detective
- Nationality: British

Melrose Plant is a fictional character in Martha Grimes' series of Richard Jury mystery novels. Superintendent Richard Jury is a Scotland Yard detective who frequently calls on Plant to assist him, unofficially, in his cases.

== Character biography ==
Melrose Plant celebrated his fortieth birthday at the commencement of the first book of the series (1981's The Man with a Load of Mischief). He is single, well-educated and wealthy and lives in the little village of Long Piddleton in Northamptonshire. He resides in the local manor house, Ardry End, as he is the only son of the (deceased) seventh Earl of Caverness. He is, by birth, the eighth Earl of Caverness (as well as several other titles), making him Lord Ardry, but he has "given up" his titles (although he occasionally takes them up again when needed in his detective work).

While in Long Piddleton, Plant associates with a variety of local characters, many of whom are also wealthy and single, at the local pub, the Jack and Hammer. At home he is plagued by his aunt Agatha, widow of his uncle Robert, who styles herself Lady Ardry. Agatha has her own cottage in Long Piddleton but is constantly visiting at Ardry End. In contrast to Plant himself, Agatha is snobbish and grasping, obsessed with the aristocracy and not above pilfering small (but expensive) items from Ardry End which she thinks will not be missed. And to top it off, she is American.

Very little is missed by Melrose Plant, however. He is clever and capable and is usually called upon by Jury to insinuate himself into the group of suspects to get an insider's view of the circumstances surrounding the murder currently under investigation. This sometimes requires him to appear as an aristocratic dilettante, naturally enough, but on other occasions he has impersonated a tradesman or a servant.

In the novels Plant, in spite of his wealth and education, is frequently at a disadvantage relative to Jury, especially in his relationships with the elegant women and precocious children who inhabit the books. He and Jury are, nonetheless, fast friends and each provides the other with vital insight in solving the crimes. As the clues to the murders slowly unfold, each of them usually arrives at the solution independently and the climactic scene usually involves them arriving on the heels of one another, either just in time or just too late.

Plant is a Lou Reed devotee, and his preferred ale is Old Peculier.

== Adaptations ==
The Man With a Load of Mischief, Help the Poor Struggler and The Deer Leap were filmed for German and Austrian television under the titles Der Tote im Pub (The Dead Man in the Pub) (2013), Mord im Nebel (Murder in the Fog) (2015) and Inspektor Jury spielt Katz und Maus (Inspector Jury Plays Cat-and-mouse) (2017). Fritz Karl as Jury, Götz Schubert as Plant and Katharina Thalbach as "Lady" Agatha Ardry.
