= Rushden Parkway railway station =

Proposed railway station in Northamptonshire, England

Coordinates: 52.2844°N 0.6347°W

Rushden Parkway

General information
- Location: Irchester, North Northamptonshire; England
- Grid reference: SP931660
- Platforms: Unknown
Location

Rushden Parkway railway station is a proposed new railway station to serve the village of Irchester in Northamptonshire, England. It would also serve the nearby towns of Higham Ferrers and Rushden.

The village has not had an active railway station since 1959. The former station building at Rushden has been preserved and now houses Rushden Station Railway Museum.

Rushden Parkway would be built on the Midland Main Line (which runs about a mile to the west of Rushden) on the site of the former Irchester railway station. In June 2009, the Association of Train Operating Companies (ATOC) commissioned a new report advocating a park and ride station, at the Irchester station site, for Rushden.

== See also ==
- Connecting Communities: Expanding Access to the Rail Network
- Rushden railway station
- Midland Main Line
