= Naseby Field =

Coordinates: 52.41283°N 0.99582°W

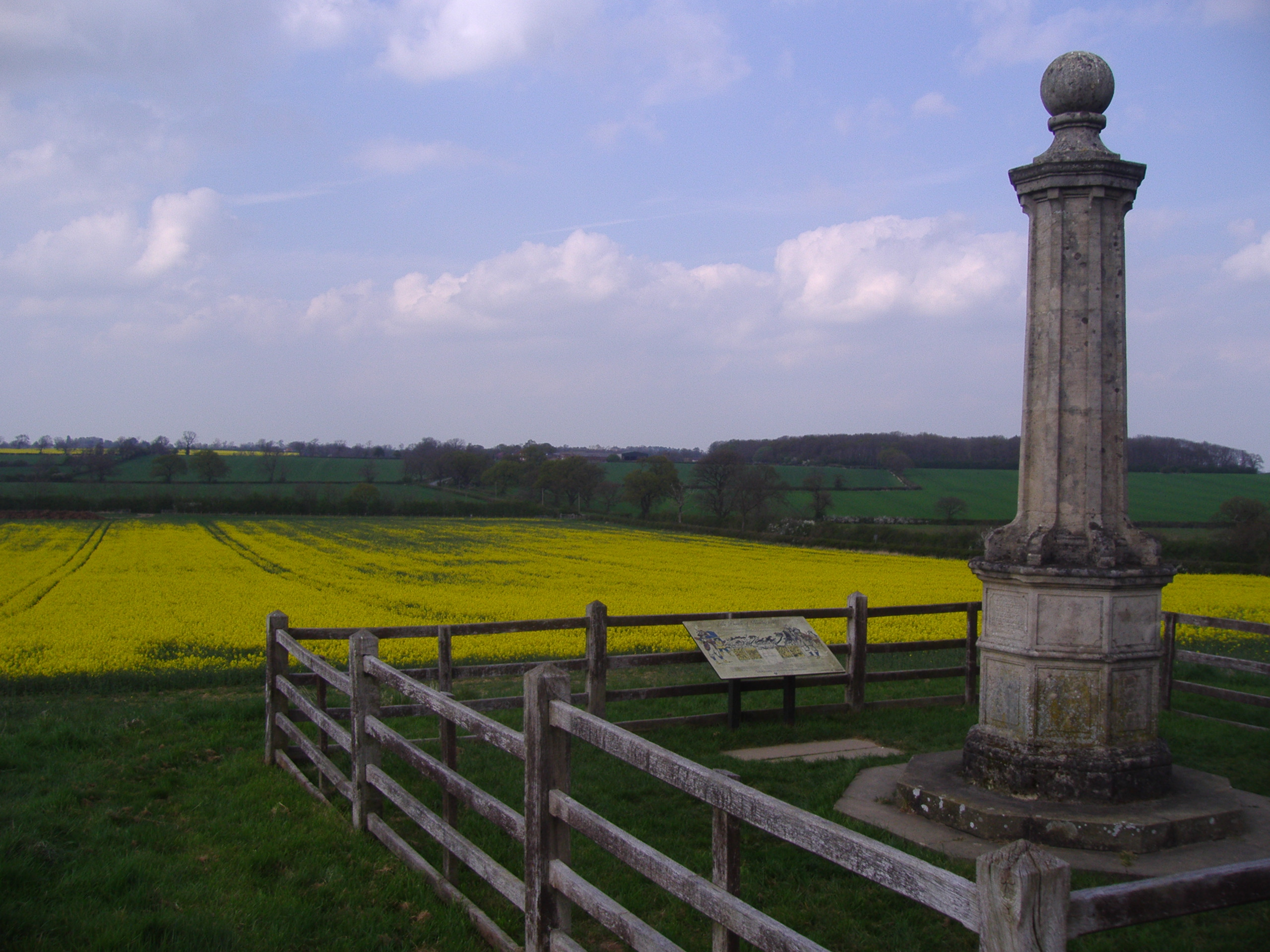
Naseby Field

Naseby Field is the location of the Battle of Naseby, a cardinal battle of the English Civil War which resulted in a disastrous royalist defeat. It is located roughly twenty miles north of Northampton or roughly seven miles southwest of the town of Market Harborough, and is just north of the A14 main road.

A commemorative plaque and obelisk (grid reference SP684799) marks the site of the battle.
