= Rushden Cavalcade =

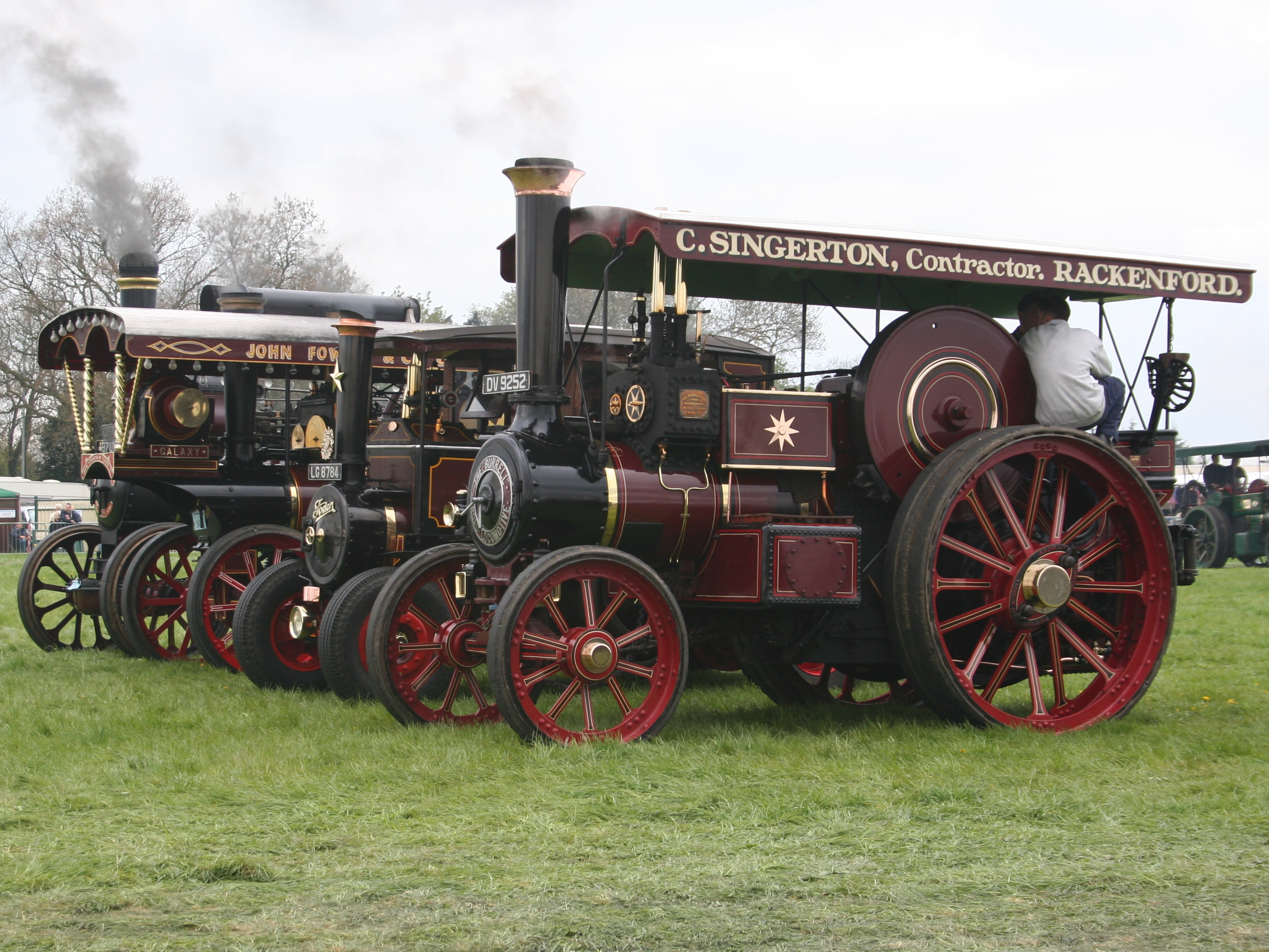
Traction engines on display at Rushden Cavalcade

Rushden Cavalcade was a 3-day event run by the Rushden Historical Transport Society (RHTS) until 2018.

The Cavalcade of transport and country fair was traditionally held over the May Bank Holiday on a field just south of Rushden. The funds helped the development of the old Rushden railway station run by the Society and the expansion of the railway activities. It was held in many Fields in Avenue road, Rushden just off the A6 Bedford.

== See also ==
- Rushden, Higham & Wellingborough Railway
- Rushden Historical Transport Society
