= Irchester railway station =

Former railway station in Northamptonshire, England

Irchester
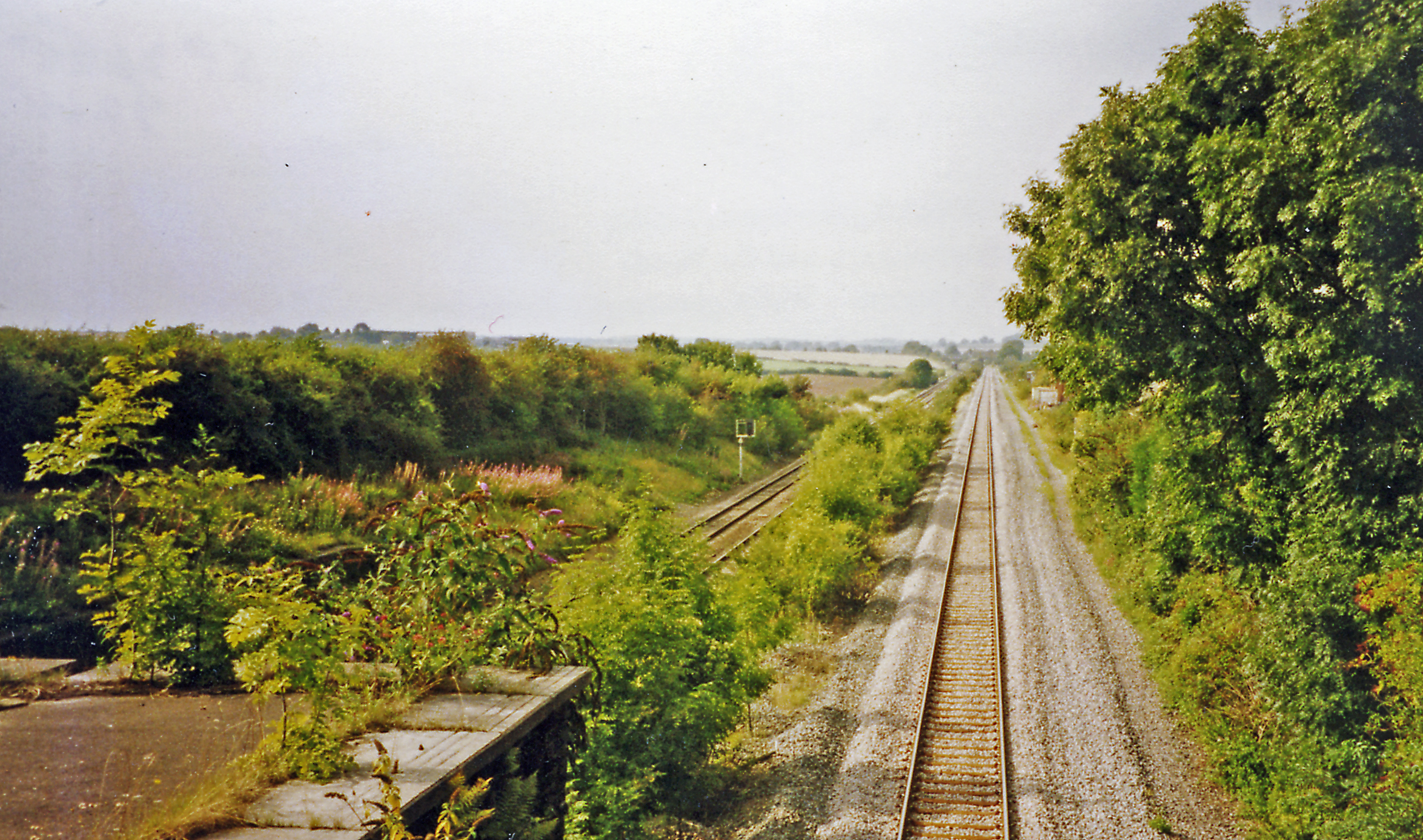
- Station remains in 2002

General information
- Location: Irchester, North Northamptonshire; England
- Coordinates: 52.28431°N 0.63469°W

Other information
- Status: Disused

History
- Original company: Midland Railway
- Pre-grouping: Midland Railway
- Post-grouping: London, Midland and Scottish Railway

Key dates
- 1857: Opened
- 1960: Closed (passenger)
- 1965: Closed (goods)
Location

Irchester railway station was built by the Midland Railway in 1857 on its extension from Leicester to Bedford and Hitchin in England.

The station building was built on an overbridge. It closed for passenger traffic in 1960, and for goods in 1965.

The Irchester Bank is one of the steepest of five summit levels between Leicester and Bedford. The surrounding country provided important traffic to the line in the form of ironstone for the smelters in Derbyshire.

In the early twenty first century local campaigners argued for the station to be reopened to serve as a 'park and ride' station for the nearby town of Rushden.

== Route ==
Preceding station	Historical railways	Following station
Wellingborough	Midland Railway; Midland Main Line	Sharnbrook

== See also ==
- Rushden Parkway railway station
