= Saturnin (novel) =

1942 novel by Zdeněk Jirotka

- Book cover by Adolf Born
- Author: Zdeněk Jirotka
- Language: Czech
- Publication date: 1942
- Publication place: Czechoslovakia

Saturnin is a 1942 humorous novel by Zdeněk Jirotka, with characters such as the dangerous servant Saturnin, the annoying Aunt Kateřina and her son Milouš, Uncle František, Doctor Vlach, and the narrator's grandfather.

This novel is strongly inspired by the work of English authors, especially Jerome K. Jerome and by novels and short stories by English writer P. G. Wodehouse which features the character of the servant Jeeves. It has been translated into English, French, German, Spanish, Italian, Ukrainian, Serbo-Croatian, Estonian, Latvian, Turkish and Polish. Foreign-language versions are issued by Charles University's publisher Karolinum.

== Film, television, and theatrical adaptations ==
A film adaptation of the same name was split into a four-part series and broadcast on Czech Television. The servant Saturnin was played by Oldřich Vízner. In 2017, Miroslav Macek wrote a sequel to Saturnin titled Saturnin se vrací (lit. 'Saturnin Returns').

== Characters ==
- Saturnin – a servant with a bold sense of humor.
- Narrator – originally nameless in the book, he was named Jiří Oulický in the film.
- Aunt Kateřina – a rather abusive woman in the novel who uses proverbs frequently.
- Grandpa – an old rich man.
- Miss Barbora Terebová – a sweet modern woman.
- Doctor Vlach – a man with a rather harsh sense of humor.
- Milouš – a boorish wastrel.
- Uncle František – he has died at the time of the storyline.

== Analysis ==
- Sehnalová, Kamila. 2013. Comparative Analysis of Czech, English and German Proverbs in Jirotka's Saturnin. BA thesis, Charles University, Prague. Link to thesis

== External links in Czech ==
- Gallery and basics about the movie (in Czech)
- Quotes and records from the movie (in Czech)
