= Irchester =

Village in Northamptonshire, England

Coordinates: 52.2783°N 0.6555°W

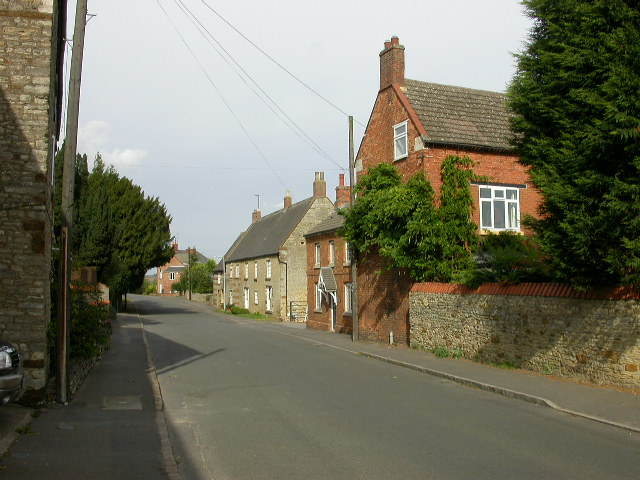
- Chester Road in Irchester, looking north

- Location within Northamptonshire
- Population: 4,745 (2011)
- OS grid reference: SP8967
  - London: 58 miles
- Unitary authority: North Northamptonshire
- Ceremonial county: Northamptonshire
- Region: East Midlands
- Country: England
- Sovereign state: United Kingdom
- Post town: WELLINGBOROUGH
- Postcode district: NN8 NN29
- Dialling code: 01933
- Police: Northamptonshire
- Fire: Northamptonshire
- Ambulance: East Midlands
- UK Parliament: Wellingborough

Irchester is a village and civil parish in North Northamptonshire, two miles (3 km) south-east of Wellingborough and two miles south-west of Rushden. The population of the village at the 2011 Census was 5,706 and estimated in 2019 at 5,767. Little Irchester and Knuston also lie in the parish.

== Toponym ==
Irchester was spelt Yranceaster in 973 and Irencestre in the 1086 Domesday Book. A. D. Mills wrote that name was formed from the Old English personal name Ira or *Yra with the suffix ceaster denoting a Roman station, but another theory is that Iren Ceastre was an Anglo-Saxon name meaning "iron fortress". In the 11th century, it was spelt Erncestre or Archester and had evolved to Erchester by the 12th century.

== History ==
Chester Farm is one mile (1.6 km) north of the village of Irchester, with the A45 road to its south and the River Nene to the north. It "represents a unique piece of historic landscape of high importance... preserving in a small area a wide range of historic features spanning several thousand years." It is a scheduled monument protected by law. Mesolithic flints have been found, with signs of later prehistoric settlement and a "nationally important" walled Roman town.

The Chester House Estate is also the location of the Fourteen Arches Viaduct. The 107m long viaduct runs over the River Nene, taking the Leicester to St Pancras mainline across the river between Irchester and Wellingborough. Contractor Thomas Brassy oversaw construction and the west viaduct opened in 1857. The east viaduct was later opened in the late 1870’s, when the line quadrupled, and has a steel girder section across the river. The location was used for the album art and music videos for A Transmission of Hope (2024) by English rock musician Tyler Quantrill.

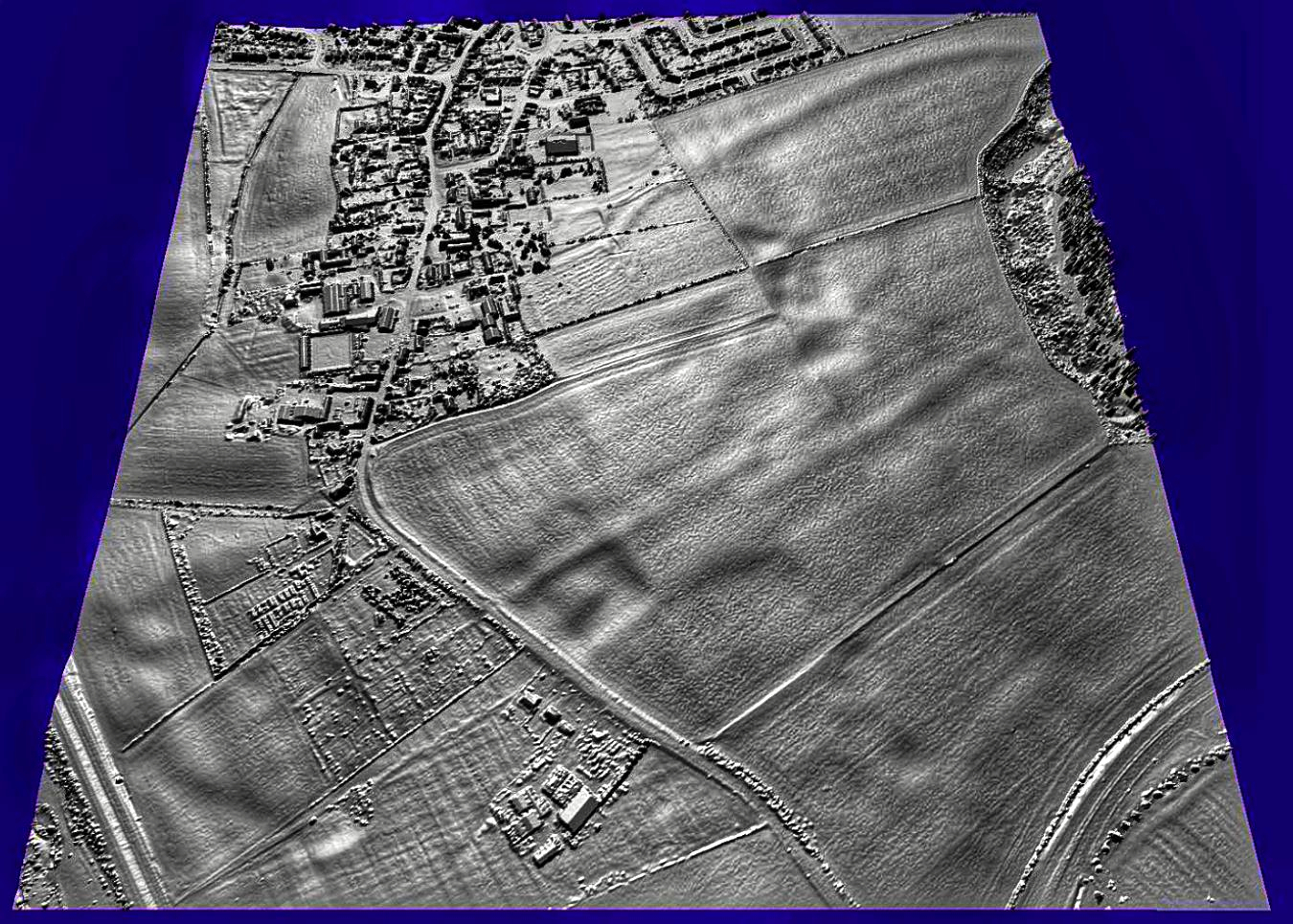
An oblique lidar view of north Irchester and associated archaeological residues

The Roman name of the settlement has been lost, but there is evidence of buildings, a cemetery, occupation outside the town walls and a causeway across the Nene floodplain. A Romano-Celtic temple was recorded inside the town boundary. Square-shaped, it faced south-east; its outer portico measured 38 feet (11.5 m) square and the inner cella about 17 feet (5 m) square. The walls were around two feet (0.6 m) thick. The tombstone of a Strator Consularis – 'a transportation officer of the consular governor' – was also found. An inscription at Irchester offers evidence of organised horse-breeding.

A road running north–south through the site and three oblong buildings to the west of the road have been identified. As only one Roman road has been found leading south, it is thought highly likely that the river served as a means of communication with other Roman settlements at Duston to the south-west and Thrapston to the north-east.

Next to the Roman town are remains of a medieval hamlet, Chester by the Water, which may have arisen in Anglo-Saxon times. The later Chester House and Farm had gardens and parkland. In the late 19th and early 20th centuries, ironstone quarrying took place to the south-west, but most of the hamlet escaped serious alteration. Tramways and other artifacts have since become "historically important" in their own right.

In 2004, Northamptonshire County Council received a grant of £1.2 million from the Office of the Deputy Prime Minister (now the Department for Communities and Local Government) and purchased Chester Farm, including the walled Roman town and the deserted medieval village of Chester on the Water. Wellingborough's Local Plan states that "planning permission will be granted for a heritage park in association with the archaeological remains of the Chester camp ancient monument." as part of the planned River Nene Regional Park. The aims in developing the park are to make Chester Farm accessible to the public and provide opportunities for education, leisure and recreation. However, the park plan stalled for want of "a viable business plan and subsequent pressure on resources". A county council report of November 2007 stated, "In order to safeguard the heritage asset, Cabinet is asked to... declare Chester Farm surplus to the operational requirements of the Council and to approve its sale." However, in 2010, the 17th-century farmhouse was gutted by fire.

In 2013, the Chester Farm site owned by Northamptonshire County Council received £4 million from the Heritage Lottery Fund to open to the public. The project was to include an archaeological resource centre. When the farmhouse on the site was badly damaged by the fire, the council received a £1.9 million insurance pay-out for repairs. Lottery monies were used to build a classroom, a conference space and an archaeological resource centre. The site is partly open to the public, with parking to the west of it.

=== Possible medieval identification ===
The 12th-century English historian Henry of Huntingdon mentions a Roman "town on the river (Nene), in Huntingdonshire, which is entirely destroyed" as one of his interpretations of the 28 cities of Britain. The town is mentioned also by William Lambarde in Dictionarium Angliae Topographicum & Historicum.

Henry names the town Dormchester, which he translates from the Celtic as Kair-Dorm. The "-Dorm" element may denote water (Dwr in modern Welsh and a common place-name root throughout England). If so, the name may have continued in English as Chester-on-the-Water. Currently no modern study has wholly rejected or accepted this hypothesis.

== Governance ==
Irchester Parish Council meets monthly at the village hall. Since local government changes in 2021 the area is covered by North Northamptonshire Council. It was represented on the former Borough of Wellingborough Council by three councillors for the ward of Irchester, and on Northamptonshire County Council by one councillor. It is in the parliamentary constituency of Wellingborough, with Gen Kitchen MP (Labour) as its current member.

== Geography ==
Irchester lies to the south-east of Wellingborough and to the south-west of Rushden, in the east of the county of Northamptonshire. It is 11 miles (18 km) north-east of the county town of Northampton and a beeline 58 miles (93 km) north-west of central London. The border of the parish is formed by the River Nene in the north and west; adjacent parishes are Wellingborough (north-west), Great Doddington (south-west), Wollaston (south), Podington in Bedfordshire (south-east), and Rushden (east). The height above sea level ranges from 40 metres (131 feet) in the river valley to 91 metres (298 feet) south of Irchester village.

== Demography ==
At the 2001 census, the population of Irchester parish was 4,807 in 2,020 households: 2,397 male and 2,410 female, with a mean age of 41 years. Of those aged 16–74 and economically active, 2,352 were employed and 80 unemployed. Most of the employed (1,930) travelled to work by private transport; 126 used public transport. The population at the 2011 Census had fallen to 4,745. The mean distance travelled to a fixed place of work was 12.64 km (7.85 mi). In 1851, the parish population was 960 and in 1861, 1,168; writing in 1872, John Marius Wilson ascribed the increase to "the opening of the railway and... discovery of iron stone."

== Transport ==
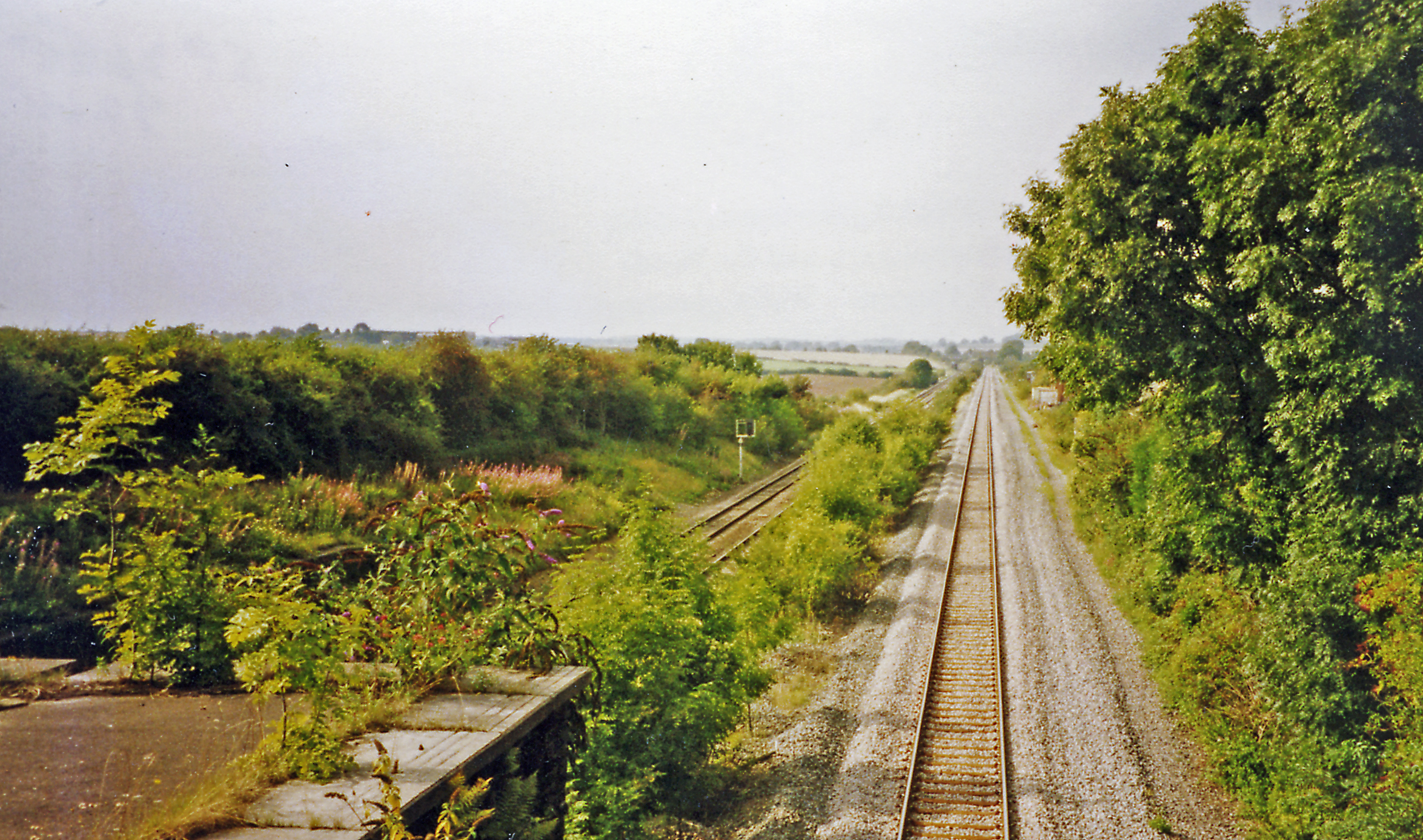
The site of the former Irchester railway station, closed in 1960

The nearest motorway is the M1 at junction 15, 13 miles (21 km) away. The nearest railway station is at Wellingborough, 2 miles (3.2 km) from the village. Places served by East Midlands Railway include London, Luton, Bedford, Nottingham, Derby and Sheffield. Irchester had a station to its east until 1965. The Association of Train Operating Companies (ATOC) and some locals argue for reopening it. (See Rushden Parkway.)

The main bus service is Stagecoach Group's X46, which connects with Wellingborough, Rushden, Northampton, Earls Barton, Higham Ferrers and Raunds. Luton Airport, 30 miles (48 km) south, is the nearest passenger airport, although there is an aerodrome at Sywell, 10 miles north-west.

== Education ==
A playgroup meets at the village hall in School Road. Irchester Primary School in nearby School Lane was designed by the architect John George Bland and opened in 1849. It has some 370 pupils aged 4–11. The nearest secondary school is in Wollaston.

== Amenities ==
The village has a health centre, car repairs, a car sales garage, a pharmacy, a library and a post office. Shops include a Co-operative supermarket. A former gift shop and estate agent have closed. There is a fish and chip shop and Chinese and Indian takeaways. Of the two village pubs, the Red Lion closed a few years ago, leaving only the Carpenters Arms.

== Sport and leisure ==
The local football team, Irchester United, known as The Romans, plays in the United Counties League Premier. The ground is in Alfred Street. Irchester Bowls Club on the High Street, also known as The Romans, has a county-standard class "A" Green. Irchester Cricket Club was founded in 1897 and plays at Alfred Street, in the Northamptonshire Cricket League.

Irchester Players is an amateur dramatic society. It puts on plays, shows, musicals and pantomimes, at Parsons Hall in the village.

=== Country park ===
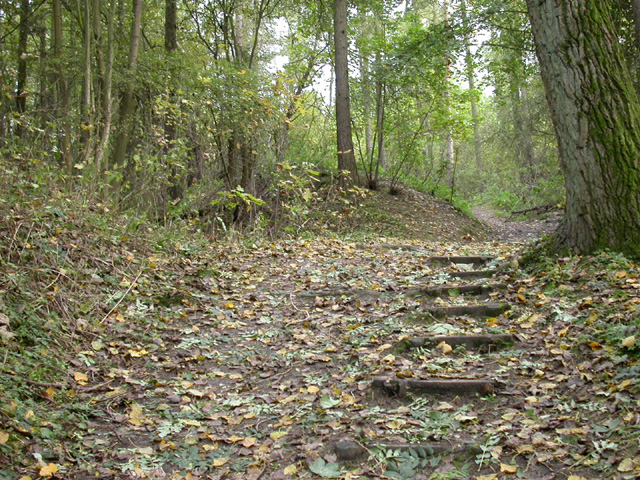
Footpath inside Irchester Country Park

The village has a large country park managed by Northamptonshire County Council, created after local open-cast ironstone quarries were allowed to revert to the wild, having been worked out some decades after the war. The removal of the ironstone and some limestone that overlaid it has lowered the land around the working face by several metres, though this is not apparent except near the vehicle entrance. The park has an unusual ridge-and-furrow topography with several metres' relief, marking the movement patterns of the machines that stripped the overburden to expose the ironstone. The park offers maturing woodlands (planted about 1965) and grassy meadows with surrounding trails. There is also a children's play area and a café.

Irchester Narrow Gauge Railway Museum in the country park shows working steam and diesel locomotives among more than 40 items of rolling stock. A 250-metre demonstration track can be seen.

Since November 2019, Irchester Country Park has hosted a free, weekly parkrun timed 5-km run/walk, every Saturday morning at 9 a.m.

== Notable residents ==
In order of birth:

- Thomas Allen (1681–1755), a religious writer, served as Vicar of Irchester in 1705–1715.
- Phil Neal (born 1951), footballer, played for Liverpool F.C. and other major clubs. His son Ashley (born 1974) is also a footballer.
- Giovanni Di Stefano (born 1955), a notable convicted fraudster, grew up in Irchester.
