= Fritz Karl =

Austrian actor

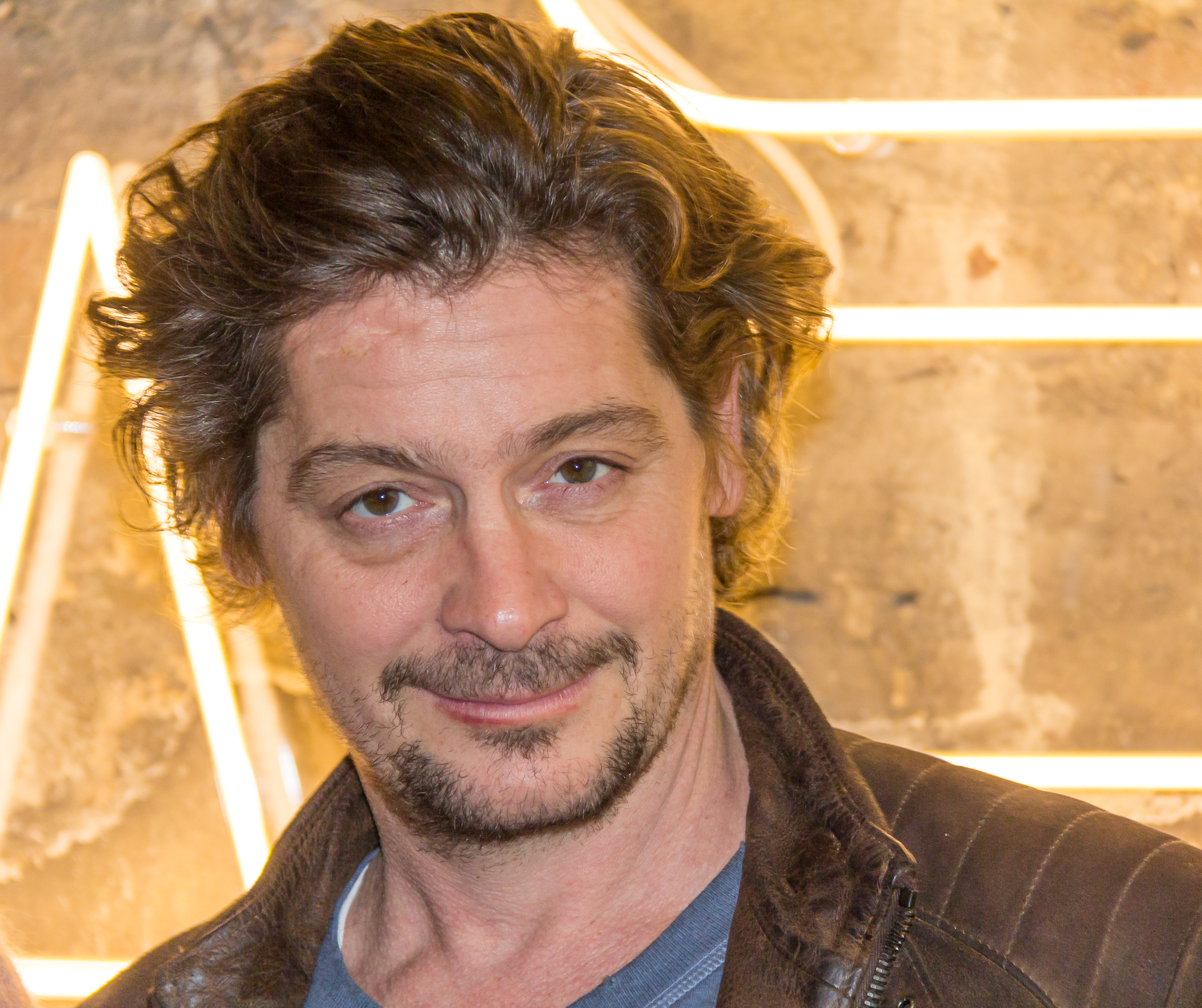
- Fritz Karl, 2014
- Born: Fritz Karl; Gmunden, Austria
- Occupation: Actor
- Years active: 1989–present

Fritz Karl is an Austrian film, television and stage actor born in Gmunden, Upper Austria. He is one of the busiest Austrian actors.

== Private life ==
Karl lives in both Munich and Vienna with his wife, German actress Elena Uhlig. The two of them have two sons and two daughters, born 2007, 2010, 2015 and 2018. He has three more children from a previous relationship.

== Filmography ==
=== Film ===
Year	Film	Role	Notes
1990	Die Spitzen der Gesellschaft		
1991	Im Dunstkreis	Peter	
1994	The Bartered Soul		
1994	Höhenangst	Mario	Max Ophüls Festival for Best Young Actor
1995	'El Chicko' – der Verdacht	Paul Strand	
1997	Ein Herz wird wieder jung	Toni	
2001	Julie's Spirit	Tyma	
2006	Grave Decisions	Lorenz Schneider	
2009	Lemming's First Case	Leopold Wallisch 'Lemming'	
2011	When Santa Fell to Earth	Fred Schuster	
2013	The White Horse Inn	Leopold Brandmeyer	

=== Television ===
Year	Programme or series	Role	Notes
1989	Arbeitersaga	Manfred	
1996	Hofrat Geiger		
1996–2007	Tatort	Walter Sedlak; Leopold Landauer; Konrad Strobl; Jochen Bender	four episodes
1997	Die Superbullen	Peter Bachler	
1998	Clarissa	Huber	
1998	Die Neue – Eine Frau mit Kaliber	Paul Riff	
1998–1999	Schlosshotel Orth	Phillip Dorndorf	
1998–2000	Polizeiruf 110	Rezzo; Karl Hrulitschka	two episodes
1998–2002	Kommissar Rex	Gustav Kuhn; Gerhard Kostial	two episodes
1999–2002	Medicopter 117 – Jedes Leben zählt	Jeff; Rainer Wörtz	two episodes
2000	Die Verhaftung des Johann Nepomuk Nestroy	Johann Nepomuk Nestroy	
2000	Julia – Eine ungewöhnliche Frau	Sebastian Reidinger	
2000	Der Weibsteufel	Gröbmayr	
2001	Tod eines Handlungsreisenden		
2001	Sophie – Sissis kleine Schwester	Ferdinand	
2001	Spiel im Morgengrauen	Leutnant Wilhelm Kasda	
2001	Entscheidung im Eis – Eine Frau jagt den Mörder	Martin Bose	
2002	Alibis for Sale	Lutz – the liar	
2002	Zwei Seiten der Liebe	Viktor Lipinski	
2002	Der Bestseller – Mord auf italienisch	Fabrizio	
2002	Snowman Seeks Snowwoman	Joe Müller	
2002	August der Glückliche	Michael	
2003	Die Männer vom K3	Pedro Gonzales	
2003	Tauerngold	Hubert von Feileis	
2003	Jennerwein	Jennerwein	
2003	Ein Banker zum Verlieben	Daniel Singer	
2003	Alpenglühen	Bertram Mayrhofer	
2003	Alles Glück dieser Erde	René Kruse	
2004	Platinum	Gustav von Thun	
2005	Secret of the Red House	Henri Clermont	
2005	SOKO Kitzbühel	Bruno Neidhardt	
2005	Ein Kuckuckskind der Liebe	Clemens	
2005	Sterne über Madeira	Gregor von Greifenberg	
2005	Rosa Roth	Severin Burghoff	
2005	Wen die Liebe trifft...	Dr. Daniel Weiss	
2005	Mutig in die neuen Zeiten – Im Reich der Reblaus	Ferdinand Redlich	
2006	Papa und Mama	Dr. Peter Ullrich	two episodes
2006	Henry Dunant: Du rouge sur la croix	Colonel Delaroche	
2006	Siska	Jürgen Röhrig	
2006	The Crown Prince	Archduke Johann	
2006	Auf ewig und einen Tag	Gregor Luckner	
2006	Geküsst wird vor Gericht	Herbert Windscheid	
2006	Mutig in die neuen Zeiten – Nur keine Wellen	Ferdinand Redlich	
2007	March of Millions	Stv. Gauleiter Herrmann	
2007	Beim nächsten Tanz wird alles anders	Leo Mossmann	
2007	Zodiak – Der Horoskop-Mörder	Anton Keller	
2007	Tango zu dritt		
2007	Eine folgenschwere Affäre	Benno Söder	Nominated-Bavarian TV Award for Best Actor in a Movie Made for Television
2008	Die Zeit, die man Leben nennt	Oskar	
2008	Il commissario Rex	Hugo Starke	
2008	Alles was recht ist	Teddy Klein	
2008	Mutig in die neuen Zeiten – Alles anders	Ferdinand Redlich	
2008	Patchwork	Daniel Rothenburg	
2008	Unter Verdacht	Gunther Brubeck	
2008	Die Patin – Kein Weg zurück	Josef	
2009	Krupp: A Family Between War and Peace	Fritz Krupp	
2009	Nachtschicht – Blutige Stadt	Dr. Tomalla	
2009	Der Bär ist los! Die Geschichte von Bruno	Hubert Wolfgruber	
2009	Alles was recht ist – Die italienische Variante	Teddy Klein	
2009	Plötzlich Onkel	Hannes Herbst	
2009	Who's G.	Gregor Teuthoff	
2009	Sisi	Graf Andrassy	
2009	Der Teufel mit den drei goldenen Haaren	Teufel	
2009	Men in the City	Martin	
2010	The Secret of the Whales	Steven Thompson	
2010	Hopfensommer	Karl Singhammer	
2010	Rosannas Tochter	Josch	
2010	Liebe vergisst man nicht	Robert Kant	
2012	Out of Sight	Decker	
2013	The Other Child	Dave Tanner	
2013	The Beautiful Spy	Hilmar Dierks	
2014	Der Tote im Pub	Inspektor Jury	TV-adaptation of The Man With A Load Of Mischief by Martha Grimes
2015	Mord im Nebel	Inspektor Jury	TV-adaptation of Help the poor Struggler by Martha Grimes
2017	Inspektor Jury spielt Katz und Maus	Inspektor Jury	TV-adaptation of The Deer Leap by Martha Grimes
