= Martha Grimes =

American crime writer and literature professor

- Born: May 2, 1931 (age 95); Pittsburgh, Pennsylvania, U.S.
- Education: University of Maryland, College Park (BA, MA); University of Iowa
- Occupation: Writer
- Writing career
- Genre: Detective fiction
- Notable awards: Nero Award (1983)
- Website: www.marthagrimes.com

Martha Grimes (born May 2, 1931) is an American writer of detective fiction. She is best known for a series featuring Richard Jury, a Scotland Yard inspector, and Melrose Plant, an aristocrat turned amateur sleuth.

== Early life and education ==
Martha Grimes was born May 2, 1931 in Pittsburgh, to William Dermit Grimes, Pittsburgh's city solicitor, and June Dunnington, who owned the Mountain Lake Hotel in Western Maryland, where Martha and her brother spent much of their childhood.

She earned her B.A. and M.A. at the University of Maryland and did postgraduate work at the University of Iowa.

== Career ==
Grimes has taught at the University of Iowa, Frostburg State University, and Montgomery College (Takoma Park).

Grimes initially became known for her series of novels featuring Richard Jury, an inspector with Scotland Yard, and his friend Melrose Plant, a British aristocrat who has given up his titles. Each of the Jury mysteries is named after a pub.

Her Emma Graham quartet of novels beginning with Hotel Paradise is set in an atmospheric aging lake resort in western Maryland, and delves into mysteries of past secrets and human nature. The background of the series draws from her experiences during summers at her mother's hotel in Mountain Lake Park, Maryland. One of the characters, Mr. Britten, is patterned on Britten Leo Martin Sr., who then ran Martin's Store, which he owned with his father and brother. Martin's Store is accessible by a short walkway from the Mountain Lake Hotel, the site of the former hotel, which was torn down in 1967.

Biting the Moon (1999) was the first of two books featuring young teenagers who fight animal abuse.

== Recognition ==
In 1983, Grimes received the Nero Wolfe Award for best mystery of the year for The Anodyne Necklace. In 2012, Grimes was named Grand Master by the Edgar Awards Mystery Writers of America.

== Personal life ==
Grimes lives in Bethesda, Maryland. She is a vegetarian. Martha and her son Ken Grimes co-wrote the 2016 book Double Double: A Memoir of Alcoholism. She overcame spasmodic dysphonia after successful treatments provided by Dr. Robert Sataloff.

Grimes has donated two thirds of her royalties from Biting the Moon to animal-protection organizations.

== Works ==
Richard Jury series (with Melrose Plant)

1. The Man with a Load of Mischief (Boston: Little, Brown, 1981)
2. The Old Fox Deceiv'd (Boston: Little, Brown, 1982)
3. The Anodyne Necklace (Boston: Little, Brown, 1983)
4. The Dirty Duck (Boston: Little, Brown, 1984)
5. Jerusalem Inn (Boston: Little, Brown, 1984)
6. Help the Poor Struggler (Boston: Little, Brown, 1985)
7. The Deer Leap (Boston: Little, Brown, 1985)
8. I Am the Only Running Footman (Boston: Little, Brown, 1986)
9. The Five Bells and Bladebone (Boston: Little, Brown, 1987)
10. The Old Silent (Boston: Little, Brown, 1989)
11. The Old Contemptibles (Boston: Little, Brown, 1991)
12. The Horse You Came In On (New York: Alfred A. Knopf, 1993)
13. Rainbow's End (New York: Alfred A. Knopf, 1995)
14. The Case Has Altered (New York: Alfred A. Knopf, 1997)
15. The Stargazey (New York: Holt, 1998)
16. The Lamorna Wink (New York: Viking/Penguin, 1999)
17. The Blue Last (New York: Viking/Penguin, 2001)
18. The Grave Maurice (New York: Viking Penguin, 2002)
19. The Winds of Change (New York: Viking/Penguin, 2004)
20. The Old Wine Shades (New York: Viking/Penguin, 2006)
21. Dust (New York: Viking/Penguin, 2007)
22. The Black Cat (New York: Viking/Penguin, 2010)
23. Vertigo 42 (New York: Scribner, 2014)
24. The Knowledge (New York: Atlantic Monthly Press, 2018)
25. The Old Success (New York: Atlantic Monthly Press, 2019)
26. The Red Queen (New York: Atlantic Monthly Press, 2025)

The Man with a Load of Mischief, Help the Poor Struggler and The Deer Leap were filmed on behalf of the German and Austrian broadcasters ZDF and ORF under the title Der Tote im Pub (The Dead Man in the Pub; 2013), Mord im Nebel (Murder in the Fog; 2015), and Inspektor Jury spielt Katz und Maus (Inspector Jury plays Cat-and-Mouse; 2017), respectively. Starring are Fritz Karl as Jury, Götz Schubert as Plant, and Katharina Thalbach as "Lady" Agatha Ardry.

Andi Oliver series

1. Biting the Moon (New York: Holt, 1999)
2. Dakota (New York: Viking/Penguin, 2008)

Featuring Maud Chadwick (who is also a character in the Emma Graham Series)

1. The End of the Pier (Ballantine Books, 1993)

Emma Graham series

1. Hotel Paradise (Knopf, 1996)
2. Cold Flat Junction (2000)
3. Belle Ruin (2005)
4. Fadeaway Girl (2011)

Novels, short stories & poetry

- Send Bygraves (Putnam, 1990)
- The Train Now Departing (New York: Viking/Penguin, 2001)
- Foul Matter (New York: Viking/Penguin, 2003)
- The Way of All Fish (Simon and Schuster, 2014)

Memoirs

- Double Double: A Memoir of Alcoholism with Ken Grimes (Scribner, 2016)
