= Zdeněk Jirotka =

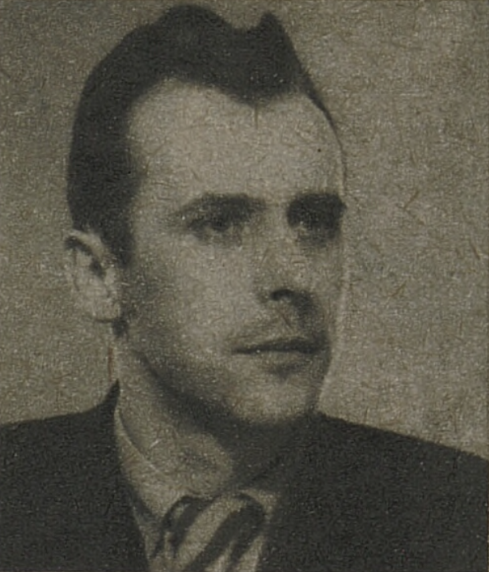
Zdeněk Jirotka (Mladý svět, 1961)

Zdeněk Jirotka (7 January 1911 – 12 April 2003) was a Czechoslovak writer of radio-broadcast plays and author of humorous novels, short stories, and feuilletons. He was born in Ostrava (Silesia), sat for the leaving examination at the secondary industrial school in Hradec Králové in 1933 and then joined the Army where he served until 1940. After the Nazis had annexed Czechoslovakia, Jirotka worked for the Public Works Ministry and in 1942, when his most famous novel Saturnin earned him great success, he became a full-time writer. Among other newspapers and magazines that Jirotka contributed to were: the Lidové noviny (1940-1945), the Svobodné noviny (1945-1951), and the Dikobraz (1951-1953 and after 1962).

== Works ==
- Saturnin, originally published in 1942 (translated into English in 1970), a humorous and satirical story of a charismatic servant, Saturnin, who carries out tasks given by his young employer, but not in the way one would expect. The book plays upon words and meanings of Czech proverbs. Its characters and events reflect the author's nostalgia for the epoch before World War II.

== Literature ==
- Sehnalová, Kamila. 2013. Comparative analysis of Czech, English, and German proverb in Jirotka's Saturnin. BA thesis, Charles University, Prague. Link to thesis
