= MSDS Marine =

British marine and coastal archaeological contractor

MSDS Marine Ltd
- Type: Privately held company
- Industry: Archaeology
- Founded: 2011
- Headquarters: The Dairy, Boothswood Farm, Holbrook, Derbyshire, UK
- Services: Maritime Archaeology; Geophysical survey
- Number of employees: 11
- Website: https://msdsmarine.com/

MSDS Marine is a British marine and coastal contractor that specialises in the management, execution and support of archaeological projects in the marine environment. The company also engages in outreach to educate the public about marine and coastal heritage and environments and provides opportunities for volunteering.

== History ==
MSDS Marine was set up in 2011, and became a limited company in 2015. In 2019 MSDS Marine opened an office in Holbrook, Derbyshire. The company is a CIfA Registered Organisation, a member of the Association of Diving Contractors, and a member of the Federation of Archaeological Managers and Employers.

== Notable projects ==
In 2017 and 2018 MSDS Marine, in partnership with the Rijksdienst Voor het Cultureel Erfgoed and Historic England, conducted an excavation of the remains of the eighteenth-century Dutch East Indiaman the Rooswijk, and As of 2020 are leading the post excavation works which are planned to finish in 2021. In 2018 MSDS Marine produced a virtual dive trail for the Rooswijk.

Between 2014 and 2016 MSDS Marine worked alongside Cotswold Archaeology to excavate the wreck of the seventeenth century second-rate ship of the line London.. The excavation was licensed and funded by Historic England. During this excavation a gun carriage was recovered which has been hailed as a nationally significant find MSDS Marine are also contracted to undertake remote sensing work on the site of the wreck to monitor ongoing erosion. MSDS Marine also assisted in the development of a virtual dive trail for the London.

Other projects include the development of virtual trails for the protected wreck site at Thorness Bay and the submarine U8, and the retained archaeologist role for a number of offshore wind farms.

== In media ==
MSDS Marine has been featured on the BBC's Digging for Britain, Wind Energy Network Magazine Current Archaeology magazine, and the National Geographic Channel’s Drain the Oceans.
