= Brixworth =

Village in Northamptonshire, England

Coordinates: 52.329°N 0.904°W

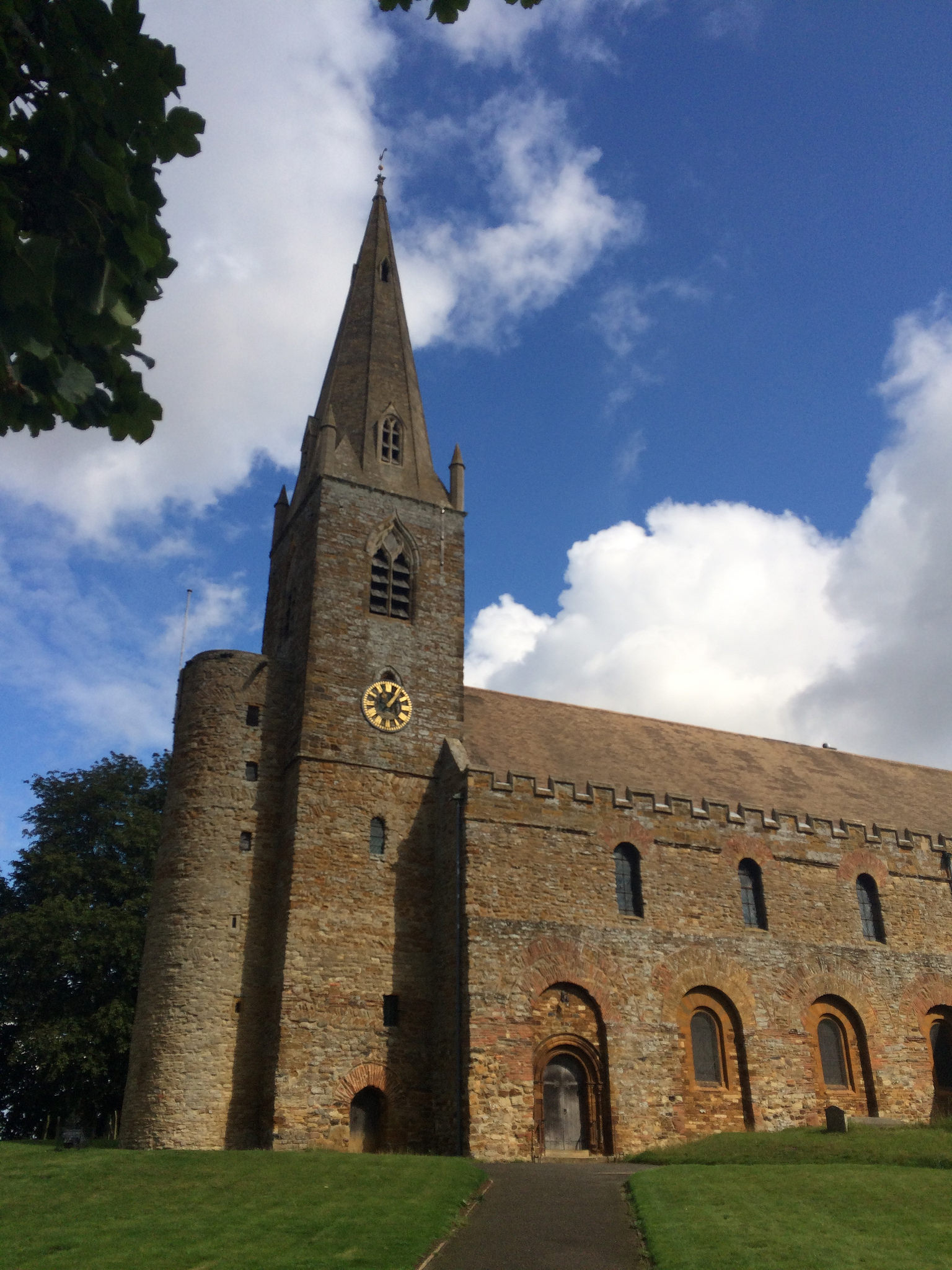
- All Saints' Church, Brixworth

- Location within Northamptonshire
- Population: 5,162 (2001 census) 5,228 (2011 census)
- OS grid reference: SP7470
- Civil parish: Brixworth
- Unitary authority: West Northamptonshire
- Ceremonial county: Northamptonshire
- Region: East Midlands
- Country: England
- Sovereign state: United Kingdom
- Post town: Northampton
- Postcode district: NN6
- Dialling code: 01604
- Police: Northamptonshire
- Fire: Northamptonshire
- Ambulance: East Midlands
- UK Parliament: Daventry
- Website: Brixworth Online

Brixworth is a village and civil parish in West Northamptonshire, England. The 2001 census recorded a parish population of 5,162, increasing to 5,228 at the 2011 census. The village's All Saints' Church is of Anglo-Saxon origin.

== Location ==
The village is about 5 miles (8 km) north of Northampton next to the A508 road, which now by-passes the village. It is about 8 miles (13 km) south of Market Harborough. About 3 miles (5 km) north of the village is a junction with the A14 road that runs between the M1 and M6 motorway interchange at Catthorpe east to Cambridge and the east coast port of Felixstowe.

The village is popular with commuters to Leicester, Peterborough, Birmingham and London. The nearest railway stations for London are at Northampton, for London (Euston – EUS), and Kettering for London (St Pancras – STP) and for Leicester (LEI) at Market Harborough. Trains for Northampton also go to Coventry and Birmingham.

== History ==
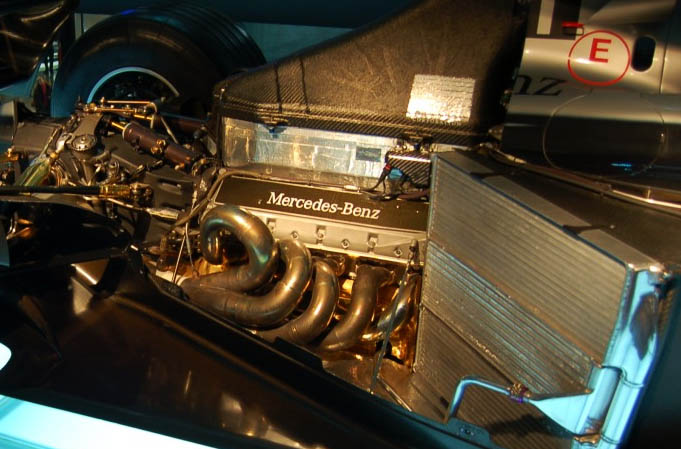
F1 engine made by Ilmor in Brixworth

The place-name 'Brixworth' is first attested in the Domesday Book of 1086, where it appears as Briclesworde. The name means 'Beorhtel's or Beorhthelm's homestead or enclosure'.

A lengthy article about the history of the parish appears in the Victoria County History for Northamptonshire, volume 4, which was published in 1937. Its text can be consulted at British History Online.

The main road from Northampton to Market Harborough passed through the village, where a number of inns served the needs of travellers for refreshment, lodging and a change of horses. The buildings of two present-day pubs in the village date back to the era of horse-drawn transport:

- "The George Inn"
- "The Coach and Horses"

In 1819 Sir Charles Knightley purchased land between Spratton Road and Kennel Terrace, where the Pytchley Hunt then erected kennels, providing a fresh source of local employment at a time of agricultural depression. The Hunt remained in the village until 1966, after which the site was developed for housing.

=== The church ===
All Saints' Church is one of the oldest, largest and most complete Anglo-Saxon churches in the country. It was founded circa 680 AD and was called "the finest Romanesque church north of the Alps" by Sir Alfred Clapham.

=== Chartism ===
In June 1839, Brixworth was the scene of a notable public meeting addressed by the Chartist Robert George Gammage of Northampton. Before the meeting took place, Gammage and his two companions attended a service in the parish church where the vicar Charles Frederic Watkins rebuked them and threatened the three with arrest if the meeting proceeded. Despite this, Gammage recalled that attendance at the roadside assembly later that day amounted to several hundreds and Watkins' efforts to persuade the constable to arrest those who addressed it were unsuccessful.

=== Poor Law Union ===
Brixworth Poor Law Union was established in 1835 and a workhouse erected on the south side of Spratton Road soon afterwards. Only the entrance block, including some later side extensions to it, remains; these premises are now used for business purposes. The activities of the Brixworth Poor Law Union attracted controversy, particularly in the latter part of the 19th century, because of its reluctance to provide relief to poor people unless they agreed to enter the workhouse. Brixworth is the focus of a substantial work on the political, social and personal implications of welfare policies during the period. The workhouse was closed in 1935.

=== The railway ===
The Northampton and Market Harborough railway through the parish was opened in 1859, passing 0.5 miles (800 m) west of the village. British Railways closed Brixworth railway station to passenger traffic in 1960 and closed the line to freight traffic in 1981. The trackbed of the former railway was reopened in 1993 as the Brampton Valley Way.

=== Iron ore quarrying ===
At various times iron ore quarrying has been carried out on the north, east and south sides of the village. The ore was taken in various ways to the railway for transport to ironworks. The first quarry can still be seen west of the church at a place called Stonepit Close. It is now allotments. Quarrying began in 1863 and finished about 1874. It is not clear if the ore was taken away by tramway or by horse and road wagon to the station. In about 1873 another quarry was opened nearby, to the north of the church. This was connected by 4 ft (1,219 mm) gauge tramway to sidings at the station. When this was worked out the same tramway served later quarries further east to the north and south of Scaldwell Road, finishing in 1936 south of Scaldwell Road and in 1947 further north. The later quarries in this system were to the east of the A508.

Another quarry began in 1873 to the south of the village connected with the railway by 4 ft gauge tramway. This was firstly to the west of the main road in the area to the south of Foxhill Crescent and later to the east of the main road in the vicinity of what is now Ashway. Quarrying finished here in about 1912.

A new pit was begun in 1939, operating until 1949. This was operated by the Staveley Coal and Iron Company and was connected to their quarrying operation at Scaldwell by an extension of their 3 ft (914 mm) gauge tramway. The ore was transported from Scaldwell to sidings near Hanging Houghton via an aerial ropeway. The aerial ropeway was replaced in 1954 by a standard-gauge branch line.

Another quarry began operation in 1880 west of Station Road, opposite Stonepit Close. It had its own tramway to the sidings at Brixworth Station and ceased operation in 1896.

The 4 ft gauge tramways were worked by horse at first but the first steam locomotive was in use by 1879. Quarrying was done by hand at first. The first steam quarrying machine was in use by 1917, and the first diesel machine in 1935. Close to the south and east of the village most of the quarried area has had housing and an industrial estate built on it. In the industrial estate the street names Ironstone Way, Quarry Road, Ferro Fields and Staveley Way commemorate the quarries. Apart from Stonepit Close the visible remains of the quarrying are in the form of ground levels being below the roads and surrounding fields. The industrial estate and part of the churchyard are lower than the original landscape, due to the quarrying activity.

=== Village development ===
From the 1960s onwards, a large amount of new housing has been built at Brixworth, mainly on fields to the south of the original village. A by-pass on the east side has diverted traffic travelling between Northampton and Market Harborough away from the built-up area. Another major change has been the creation of Pitsford Water (a reservoir) and Brixworth Country Park, which are a short distance from the village.

== Notable buildings ==
The Historic England website contains details of a total of 17 listed buildings in the parish of Brixworth, all of which are Grade II apart from All Saints' Church, which is Grade I. They include:

- All Saints' Church, Church Street
- Brixworth War Memorial, All Saints' Churchyard
- Coach and Horses Inn, Harborough Road
- Cross, Church Street
- Home Farmhouse, Church Street
- Mint Cottage, Church Street
- Steps Cottage, Silver Street
- The Firs, Saneco Lane
- George Inn, Northampton Road
- The Granary, Church Street
- The Grange, Kennel Terrace
- The Lodge, Northampton Road
- Manor House, Harborough Road
- Old Vicarage, Church Street
- Pound House, Northampton Road

== Brixworth Hall ==
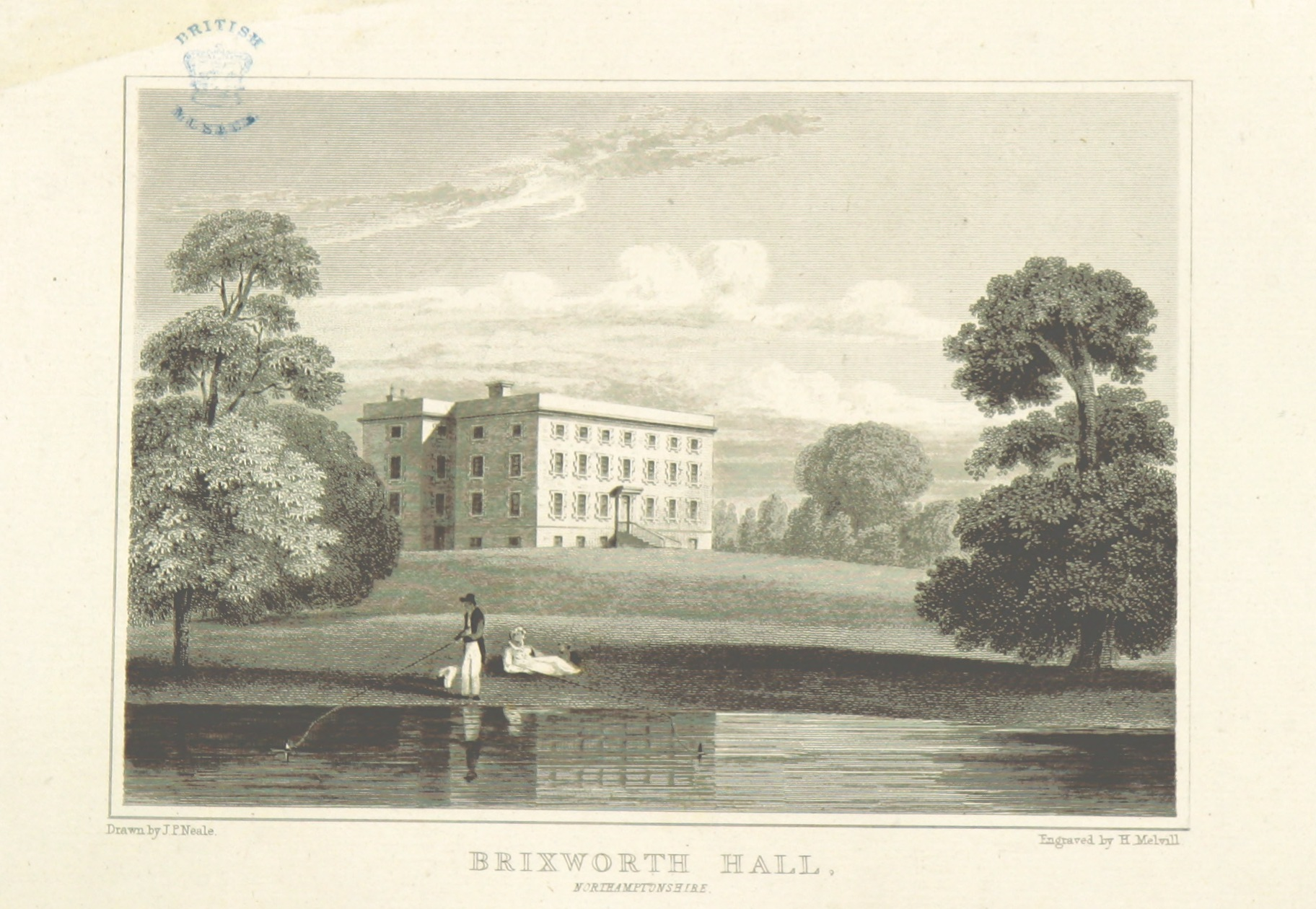
Brixworth Hall from page 124 of volume 3 of "Views of the Seats of Noblemen and Gentlemen in England, Wales, Scotland and Ireland".

Brixworth Hall was near the church, surrounded by a park and close to the centre of the historic settlement of Brixworth. The hall was built in the Tudor period by the Saunders family who were part owners of the manor of Brixworth from 1532. The house was owned by four generations of the Saunders family until the early 18th century. It was extended in the 18th century, incorporating parts of the original building. The house was offered for sale by auction in 1801 at which time it was described as being a spacious stone mansion with coach house, stabling, gardens, canals and fish ponds. In 1900, Richard Lee Bevan was the owner of the Hall at the time of his death. He was a partner in Barclay, Bevan and co., the historic core of the Barclays group. The hall was demolished in 1954.

== Churches ==
The churches that currently worship at Brixworth are:

- All Saints' Parish Church
- Brixworth Christian Fellowship

A Wesleyan Methodist (later Methodist) chapel was opened in Church Street in 1811 and enlarged in 1860. The chapel closed in the 1970s and the building is now in residential use.

== School ==
The primary school at Brixworth is Brixworth Church of England Voluntary Controlled Primary School. Details of a series of reports on the school can be found in the relevant section of the Ofsted website. Four hundred and fifty pupils were on the roll at the time of the inspection in September 2011.

== Clubs and amenities ==
Brixworth Juniors Football Club is a football club that encourages children of all ages to be active and play sport. It has produced successful footballers, including AFC Rushden & Diamonds' Liam Dolman and Derby County's Jack Marriot. The adults' team, Brixworth All Saints, are in Division One of the Northamptonshire Football Combination, which is at level 8 of the National League System. It plays its home games on the village's St David's Recreation Ground.

Brixworth Cricket Club plays on the ground at Haywards Barn, which was opened in 2008, as well as on St David's playing field for third-team and junior games. The 1st team play in the premier division of the Northants Cricket League and the second and third teams play in Divisions 5 and 13. They run four junior teams between ages 9 and 17 who play on both grounds.

The Drama Society stages two to three productions annually—including a pantomime.

The village is home to an historical re-enactment society, Sir William Harrington's Companye, who recreate life as it would have been for the 15th-century inhabitants of Brixworth.

There is a free village newspaper, the Brixworth Bulletin.

Brampton Valley Way passes 0.7 miles (1.1 km) west of the village, Pitsford Reservoir is about 1 mile (2 km) to the south-east and the Northampton & Lamport Railway is 2.7 miles (4 km) to the south at Pitsford and Brampton railway station.
