= Goodwin Sands =

Sandbank off the east coast of England

Coordinates: 51°16′25″N 1°30′30″E

The Goodwin Sands

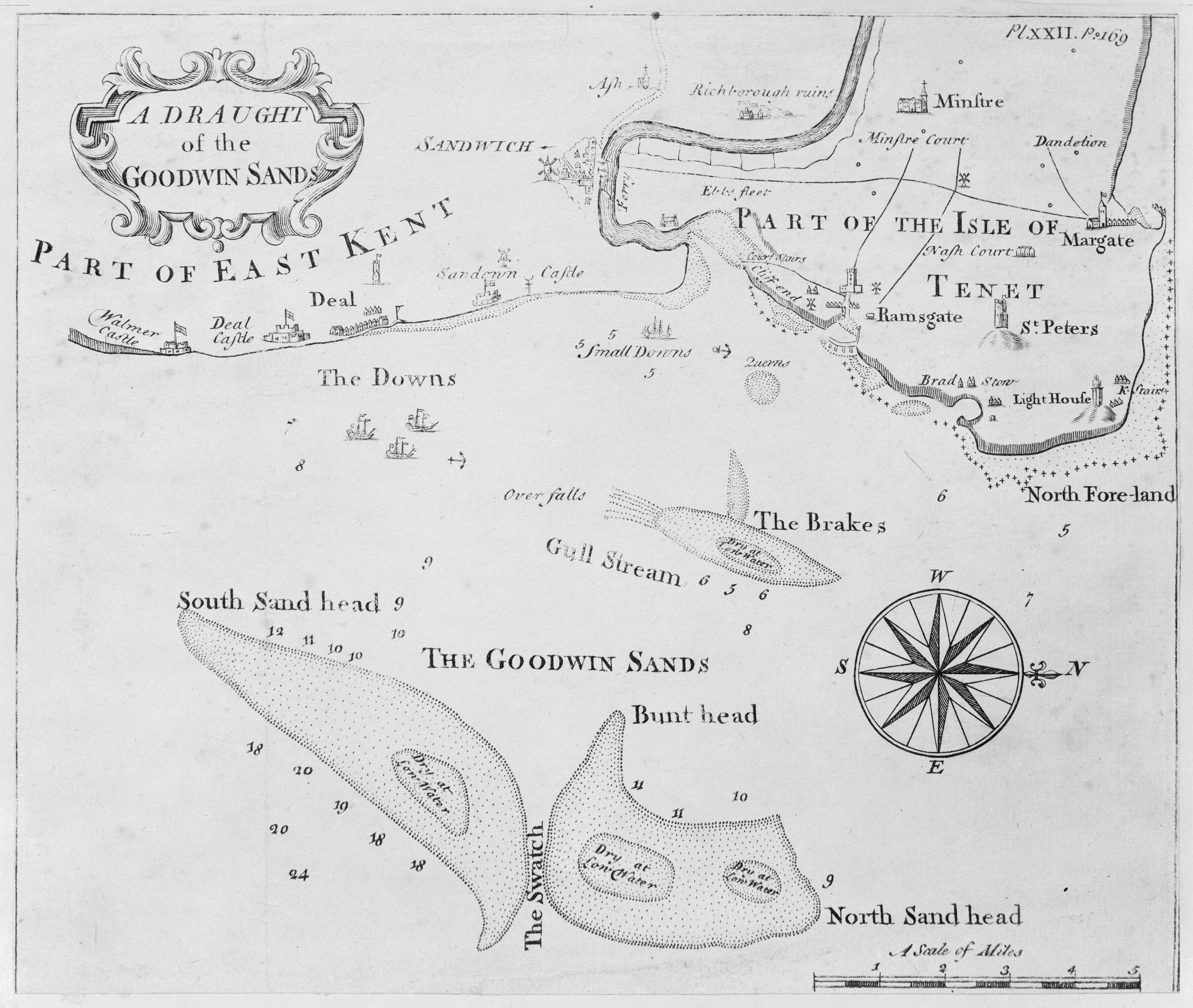
A draught of the Goodwin Sands Pl.XXII P169 RMG A8031-D (printed chart from 1750)

Goodwin Sands is a 10-mile-long (16 km) sandbank at the southern end of the North Sea lying 6 miles (10 km) off the Deal coast in Kent, England. The area consists of a layer of approximately 25 m (82 ft) depth of fine sand resting on an Upper Chalk platform belonging to the same geological feature that incorporates the White Cliffs of Dover. The banks lie between 0.5 m (1 ft 8 in) above the low water mark to around 3 m (10 ft) below low water, except for one channel that drops to around 20 m (66 ft) below. Tides and currents are constantly shifting the shoals.

More than 2,000 ships are believed to have been wrecked upon the Goodwin Sands because they lie close to the major shipping lanes through the Straits of Dover. The few miles between the sands and the coast is also a safe anchorage, known as The Downs, used as a refuge from foul weather. Due to the dangers, the area—which also includes Brake Bank—is marked by numerous lightvessels and buoys.

Notable shipwrecks include HMS Stirling Castle in 1703, VOC ship Rooswijk in 1740, the SS Montrose in 1914, and the South Goodwin Lightship, which broke free from its anchor moorings during a storm in 1954. Several naval battles have been fought nearby, including the Battles of the Goodwin Sands (Battle of the Narrow Seas) in 1602 and the Battle of Dover in 1652, and the Battle of Dover Strait in 1917.

When hovercraft ran from Pegwell Bay, Ramsgate, they made occasional voyages over the Sands, where boats could not go safely.

Southeast from Goodwin Sands lies the Sandettie Bank.

== Navigational aids ==
=== History ===
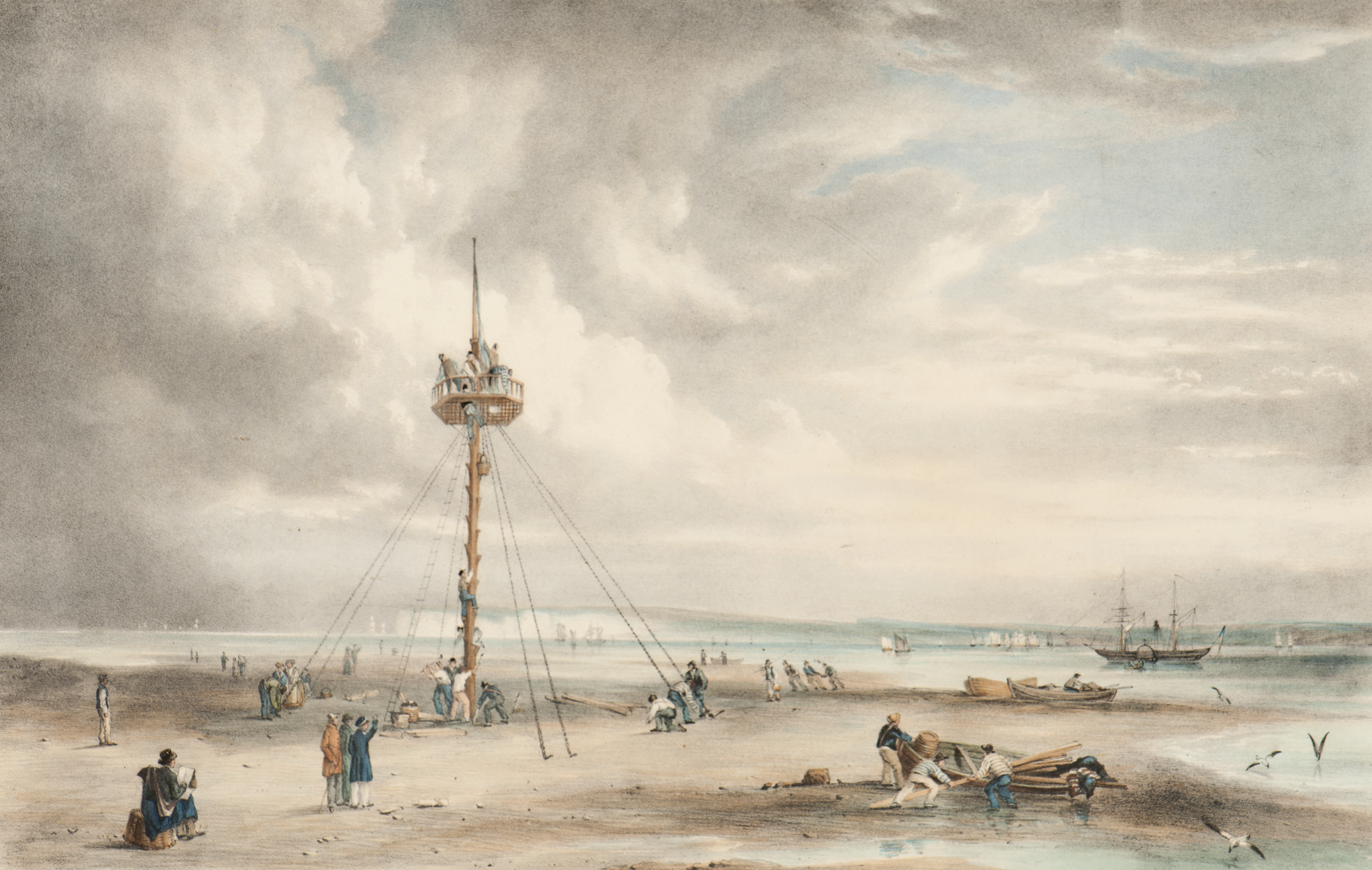
Construction of a safety beacon on the sands in September 1810

A simple fire beacon was first recorded at North Foreland in 1499, with the Sands first known depiction on a navigational chart by Lucas Janszoon Wagenaer in 1583. By 1634, two lighthouses at South Foreland provided a transit to enable crews to ensure they were a safe distance from the Sands. In 1795, the first lightship was positioned on the eastern edge of the Sands, and has been maintained ever since (despite short-lived experiments with fixed light beacons in 1840).

=== Modern day ===
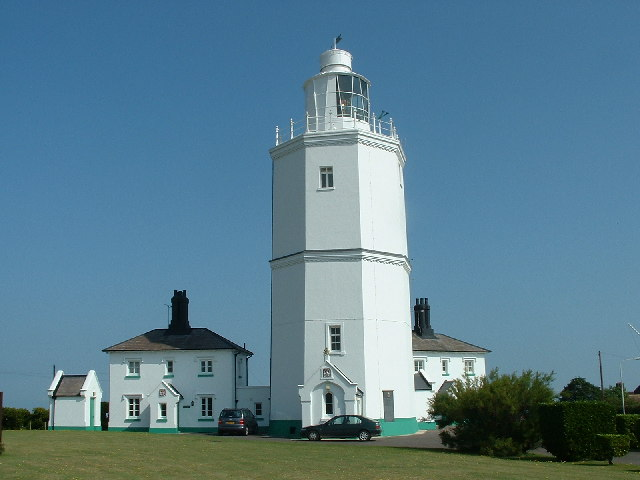
North Foreland Lighthouse.

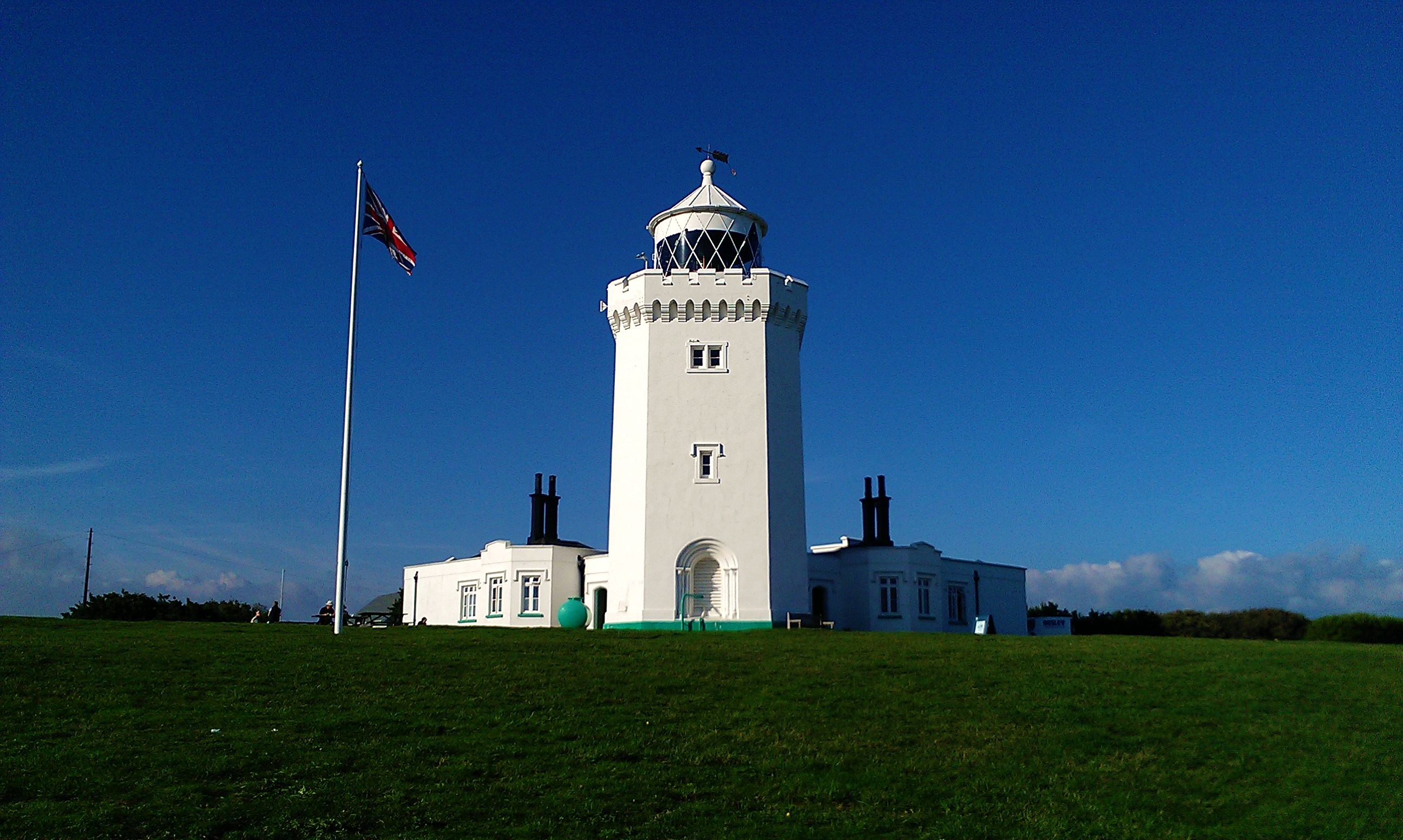
South Foreland Lighthouse once known as South Foreland Upper.

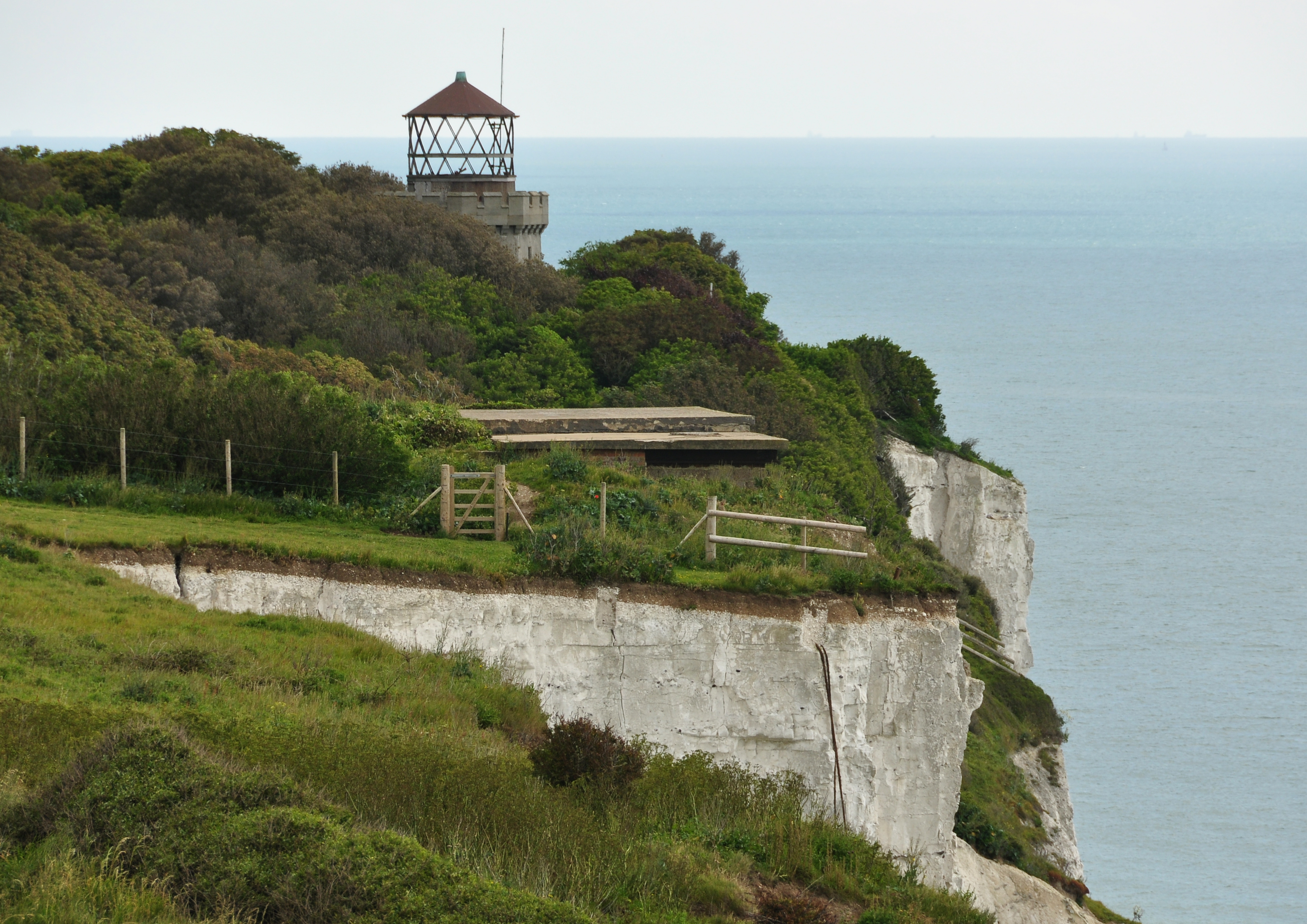
South Foreland Low Lighthouse now known as Old St Margaret's Lighthouse.

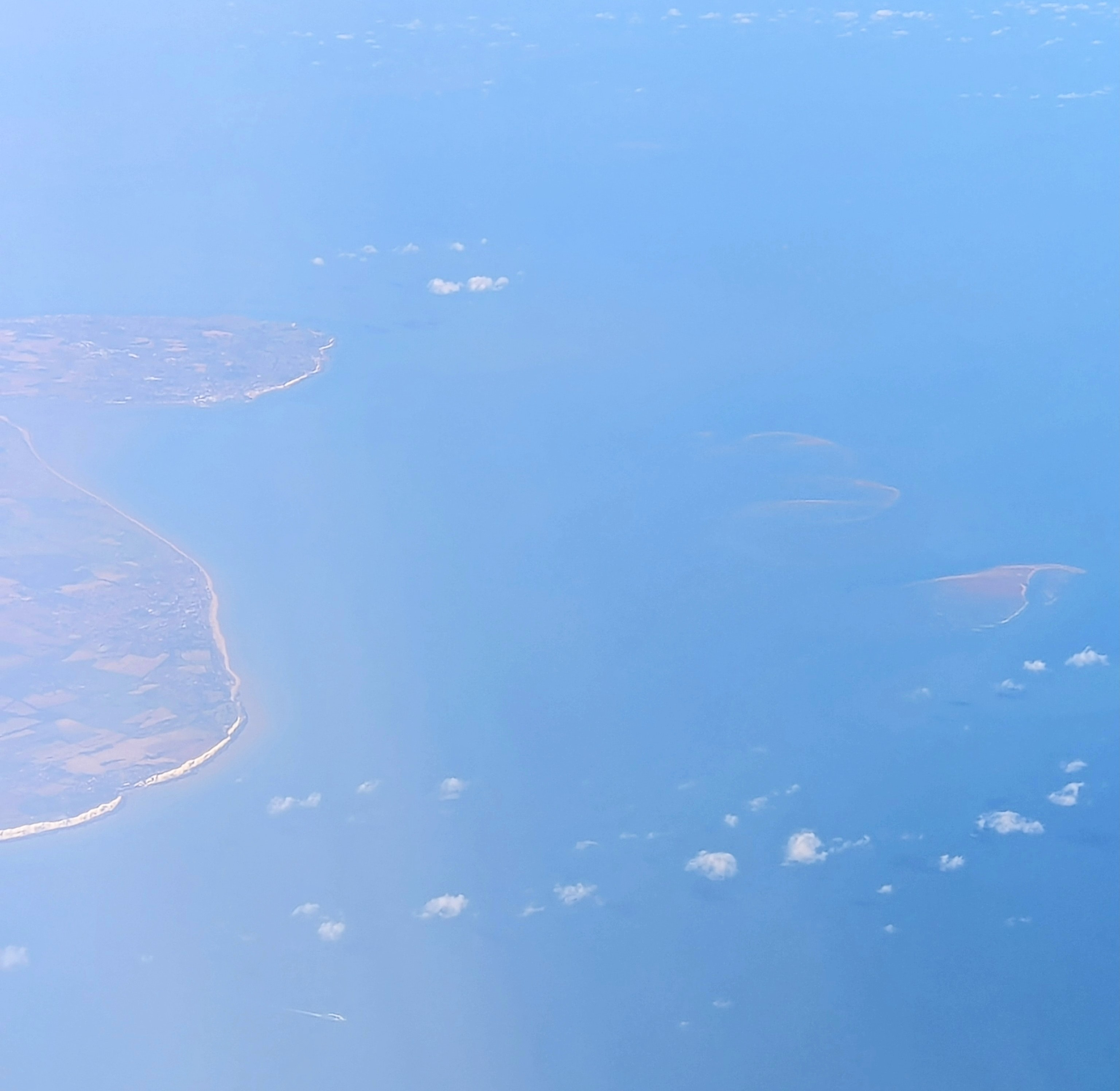
A view of Goodwin Sands off the Kentish coast viewed from the window of an Airbus A320 at 39000 ft

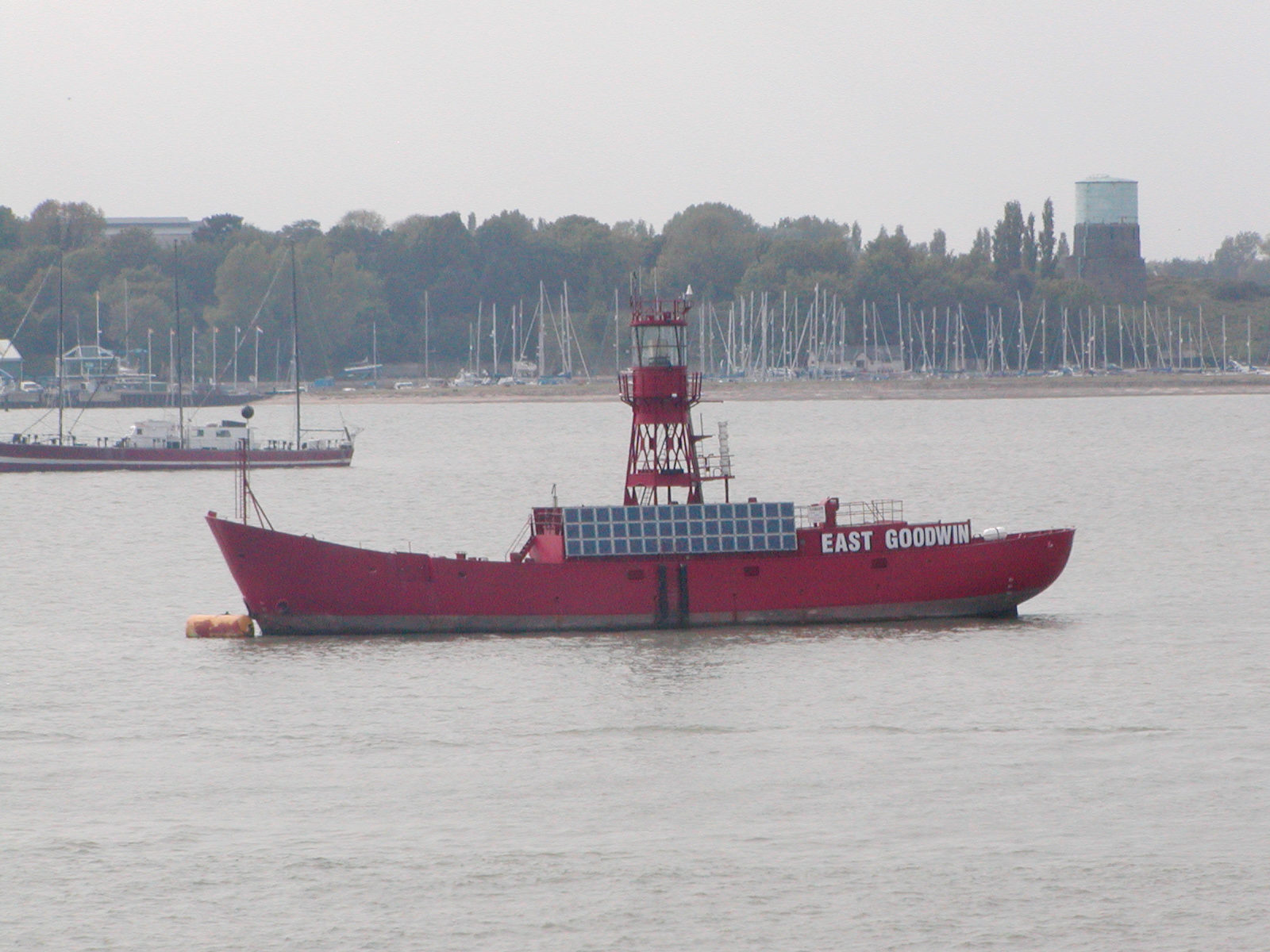
East Goodwin Lightship

The East Goodwin lightship guards the end of the Sands on the farthest part out, to warn ships. It is the only remaining lightship of the five which once guarded the sands. The sands were once covered by three lighthouses on the Kent mainland with only North Foreland lighthouse still in operation. South Foreland lighthouse, once known as South Foreland Upper lighthouse is now owned by the National Trust. This once worked with the nearby South Foreland Low lighthouse, also known as Old St Margaret's Lighthouse. When the two South Foreland lights were in alignment ships’ crews would know that they had reached the South-most extent of the sandbank. When the Goodwin sands shifted, South Foreland Low was decommissioned and replaced by the South Goodwin Lightvessel. The first of these ships was bombed by the Germans and sank on 25 October 1940. The replacement vessel, LV90 sank on 27 November 1954, when cables to her two anchors broke in a hurricane-force storm. All seven crew were lost, with only one survivor - a visitor from the Ministry of Agriculture recording bird migration - rescued. The wreck of the lightship can still be seen at low tide. The next replacement South Goodwin Lightvessel was decommissioned and was towed away on 26 July 2006, replaced with a newer light vessel by Trinity House.

== Island of Lomea ==
In 1817, borings in connection with a plan by Trinity Board to erect a lighthouse on the Sands revealed, beneath fifteen feet of sand, a stratum identified by Charles Lyell as London clay lying upon a chalk basement. Based on this, Lyell proposed that the Sands were the eroded remains of a clay island similar to Isle of Sheppey, rather than a mere shifting of the sea bottom shaped by currents and tides.

Lyell's assessment was accepted uncritically until the mid-20th century, and enlarged upon by G. B. Gattie who asserted, based on unsourced legends, that the sands were once the fertile low-lying island of Lomea, which he equated with an island said to be known to the Romans as Infera Insula ("Low Island"). This, Gattie said, was owned during the first half of the 11th century by Godwin, Earl of Wessex, after whom the Sands are named. When he lost favour, the land was supposedly given to St. Augustine's Abbey, Canterbury, whose abbot failed to maintain the sea walls, resulting in the island's destruction, some say, due to the storm of 1099 mentioned in the Anglo-Saxon Chronicle. However, the island is not mentioned in the Domesday Book, suggesting that if it existed it may have been inundated before the Domesday Book was compiled during 1085–86. The earliest written record of the name "Lomea" seems to be in the De Rebus Albionicis (published 1590) by John Twyne, but no authority for the island's existence is given. There is a brief mention of a sea-tide inundation in 1092 creating the Godwin sands in a 19th-century book of agricultural records, reissued in 1969.

The modern geological opinion is that the island of Lomea probably never existed. Although the area now covered by sands and sea was once dry land, the Strait of Dover opened in the Weald-Artois chalk range in prehistory – between about 7600 BC and 5000 BC – not within historical time.

Another theory about the origin of the name is that the sands' name came from Anglo-Saxon gōd wine = "good friend", an ironic name given by sailors, or because ships can shelter from storms in the deep water known as The Roads between the Goodwin Sands and the British coast.

== Notable events ==
=== 17th century ===
- John, the son of Phineas Pett of Chatham, was involved with an ordeal in the beginning of October 1624, when occurred:

a wonderful great storm, through which many ships perished, especially in The Downs, amongst which was riding there the Antelope of His Majesty, being bound for Ireland under the command of Sir Thomas Button, my son John then being a passenger in her. A merchant ship, being put from her anchors, came foul of her, and put her also from all her anchors, by means whereof she drove upon the brakes [the Sands], where she beat off her rudder and much of the run abaft, miraculously escaping utter loss of all, for that the merchant ship that came foul of her, called the Dolphin, hard by her utterly perished, both ship and all the company. Yet it pleased God to save her, and got off into the downs, having cut all her masts by the board, and with much labour was kept from foundering.

— From the Autobiography of Phineas Pett.

Phineas Pett received news of the shipwreck at Deal, and was dispatched by the Lord Admiral to attend to the ship and use his best means to save her. He used chain pumps, replaced the rudder, and fitted jury masts, by which effort she was brought safely to Deptford Dock.

- In October 1630, the Stella was driven onto Goodwin Sands in a storm. The ship was carrying nearly 300 Scottish and English soldiers from the Dutch Republic to the Republic of Venice for use in the War of the Mantuan Succession. All of the soldiers, including their commander, Colonel Sir John Swinton, drowned.
- In 1690 HMS Vanguard, a 90-gun second-rate ship of the line, struck the Sands before being unmoored by the boatmen of Deal.

=== 18th and 19th centuries ===
Great storm of 1703

During the great storm of 1703 at least 13 men-of-war and 40 merchant vessels were wrecked in The Downs, with the loss of 2,168 lives and 708 guns. Yet, to their credit, the Deal boatmen were able to rescue 200 men from this ordeal.

Naval vessels lost to the sands included:

- HMS Northumberland, Deptford built, and from there manned locally, lost with all hands
- HMS Restoration, Deptford built, and from there manned locally, lost with all hands
- HMS Stirling Castle, a 70-gun third-rate built at Deptford in 1679
- The Woolwich fourth-rate HMS Mary, totally overwhelmed with the loss of 343 men
- The boom ship HMS Mortar, lost with all 65 of her crew.

1740 The Dutch merchant ship "Rooswijk", on her way to Cape of Good Hope and the East Indies, became a victim to the Goodwin Sands during a storm on 8 January 1740. It sank with the loss of everyone aboard, almost 250 sailors, soldiers and passengers. The silty environment has preserved the wreck for so long, however, shifting tidal flows started to expose the timbers and goods and thus resulted in its salvage in 2017 by Historic England and the Cultural Heritage Agency of the Netherlands.

1748 According to legend the Lady Lovibond was wrecked on the Goodwin Sands on 13 February 1748, amidst alleged controversy concerning the cause of her sinking in which all persons aboard were lost. She is said to reappear every fifty years as a ghost ship. No references to the shipwreck are known to exist in contemporary records or sources, including newspapers, Lloyd's List or Lloyd's Register.

1809 Admiral Gardner was wrecked in January 1809, with her cargo, a large number of East India Company X and XX copper cash coins, belonging to Matthew Boulton. The wreck was found in 1984 and some coins were salvaged in 1985 during a licensed dive.

1851 The brig Mary White was wrecked on the Sands in a storm in 1851; the lifeboat from Broadstairs rescued seven men of her crew.

1857 The mail paddle steamer SS The Violet was driven onto the sands during a storm on 5 January 1857 with the loss of seventeen crew, a mail guard, and one passenger.

=== 20th century ===
The Belgian cargo ship SS Cap Lopez was wrecked on the sands in 1907.

HMT Etoile Polaire, a naval trawler, was sunk by a mine laid by SM UC-1 on the sands on 3 December 1915, during the First World War. On 16 January 1916, Admiralty Tug HM Tug Char sank after a collision with the Steamship Frivan in the area around South Goodwin Light Vessel.

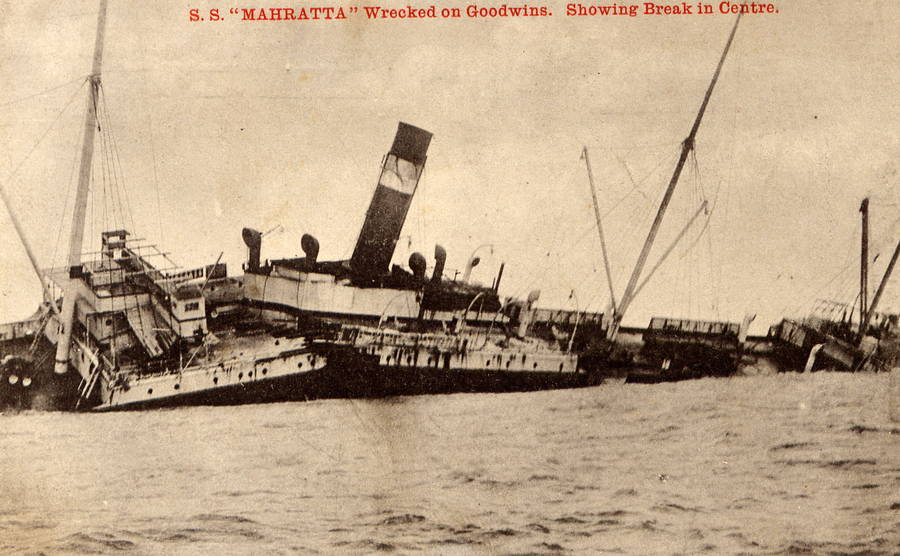
Wreck of the SS Mahratta on the Goodwin Sands, 1909. This was the first of two vessels of the name to be wrecked on these Kentish shoals.

Two ships named SS Mahratta ran aground on the Sands, one in 1909 and the other in 1939.

The US cargo steamer (and former Liberty Ship) SS Helena Modjeska, battered by a gale, ran aground on Goodwin Sands on 12 September 1946. The ship broke her back on or about 21 September 1946, and was soon in two pieces. During 1947, both pieces were subsequently refloated and towed to port for scrapping.

The Liberian tanker Panther was grounded on the Sands on 30 March 1971. Over the next week attempts were made to pull the ship free, with five tugs managing to dislodge it on the 4 April. The ship was then beached on the Dutch coast, to be broken up. The accident caused the spill of several hundred tonnes of oil into the English Channel.

The passenger ship SS Chusan collided with the freighter Prospector near the Sands in June 1953, severely damaging and nearly sinking her.

The Radio Caroline vessel MV Ross Revenge drifted onto the Sands in November 1991, effectively ending the era of offshore illicit radio in Britain.

=== 21st century ===
On 10 June 2013, a Dornier Do 17 Z2 was raised from Goodwin Sands. The German bomber had made an emergency landing in the sea over the Sands on 26 August 1940 after a bombing raid. Two of the four-man crew were killed on impact, the remaining crew becoming POWs. The Dornier was located on the Sands in September 2008 and plans were made to recover it, as it is one of two surviving aircraft of this type.

The salvage started on 3 May 2013 with the plane destined eventually for RAF Hendon in 2015, though poor weather and the position of the plane on chalk rather than the silt expected caused the plan to be amended to attaching ropes to three points on the fuselage. The plane was finally lifted on 10 June 2013. It is believed to be from 7 Staffel, III Gruppe/KG3 (7th Sqn of 3rd Group of Bomber Wing 3) operating from Sint-Truiden aerodrome 60 km east of Brussels, shot down on 26 August 1940 by a Boulton Paul Defiant of No. 264 Squadron RAF, based in Hornchurch, either one crewed by Desmond Hughes and Fred Gash or one of the three 264 Squadron aircraft shot down soon after in a battle with Bf 109E fighter escorts of the German fighter wing JG 3.

== Potential port or airport site ==
The August 1969 issue of Dock and Harbour Authority magazine had an article 'A National Roadstead' which reported on a 1968 proposal to the Ministry of Transport for reclaiming the Goodwin Sands and constructing a deep water port on them.

In 1985, consultants Sir Bruce White Wolfe Barry and Partners promoted a proposal for developing an International Freeport combined with a two-runway airport located on three reclaimed islands on the sands. In 2003, the idea was still under consideration. Being far from residential areas it has the advantage of 24-hour-a-day take-offs and landings without causing disturbance.

In December 2012, the Goodwin Sands were once again promoted as a potential site for a £39 billion 24-hour airport to become the UK's hub airport. Engineering company Beckett Rankine believes their proposals for as many as five offshore runways at Goodwin Airport are the 'most sustainable solution' with the 'least adverse impact' when compared to other options that have been proposed for the expansion of runway capacity in the southeast. They claim that this is due to the absence of statutory environmental protection on the Goodwin Sands and the alignment of the runways which avoids any overflying of the coast.

== Sports ==
In the summer of 1824, Captain K. Martin, then the Harbourmaster at Ramsgate, instituted the proceedings of the first known cricket match on the Goodwin Sands at low water. An annual cricket match was played on the sands until 2003, and a crew filming a reconstruction of this for the BBC television series Coast had to be rescued by the Ramsgate lifeboat when they got into difficulty in 2006.

When the Royal Marines School of Music was based at Deal, it played a game of cricket on a suitable day each summer.

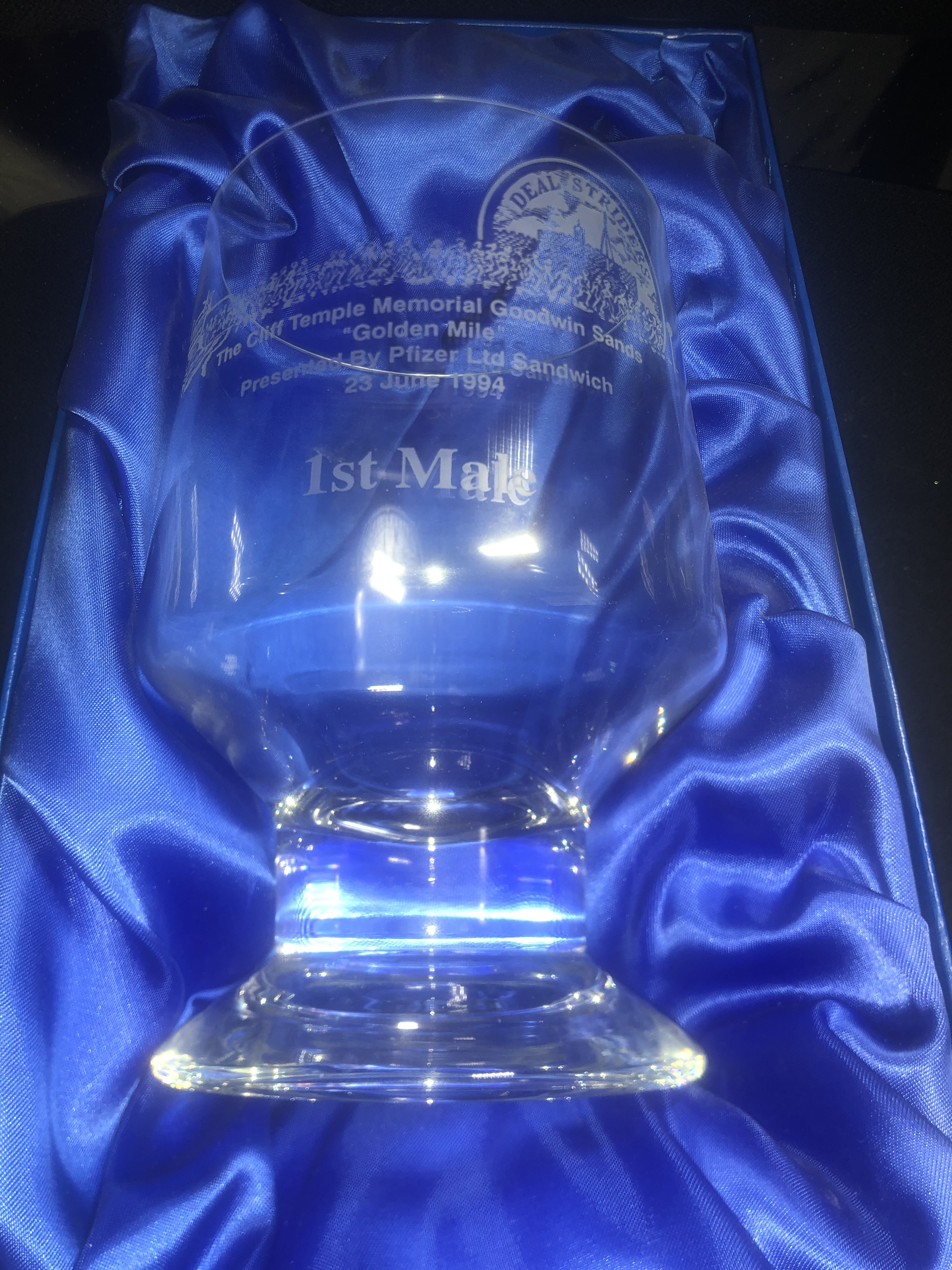
1st Male Trophy for the 1994 Deal Striders race

On 23 June 1994, Deal Striders hosted a 1-mile race on the Goodwin Sands in memory of the late Cliff Temple. Around 100 athletes and spectators set off from Dover on a cross channel hovercraft and landed on the sands at low water. A one-mile circuit was set up on the sands and the race started. In a punishing wind, the event was won by Matt de Freitas, with London Marathon winner Mike Gratton 2nd, and Olympic Steeplechaster Tom Buckner 3rd.

== Dredging ==
After a two-year public consultation the Marine Management Organisation (MMO) granted Dover Harbour Board a licence to dredge 3 million tonnes of aggregate from the Goodwin Sands on 26 July 2018. The scheme was opposed by marine conservation organisation Marinet, who said that the work would "likely cause severe damage to the marine life and the aircraft remains". The plans were abandoned by Dover Harbour Board in 2022 after their licence expired, with no dredging having been undertaken.

== Literary references ==
William Shakespeare mentions the Sands in The Merchant of Venice, Act 3 Scene 1:

Why, yet it lives there uncheck'd that Antonio hath a ship of rich lading wrecked on the narrow seas; the Goodwins, I think they call the place; a very dangerous flat and fatal, where the carcasses of many a tall ship lie buried, as they say, if my gossip Report be an honest woman of her word.

Shakespeare also mentions Goodwin Sands in King John, Act 5 Scene 5:

Messenger:The Count Melun is slain; the English Lords\ By his persuasion are again fall'n off,\ And your supply, which you have wish'd so long,\ Are cast away and sunk on Goodwin Sands.

Mary Wroth refers to Goodwin Sands as a place of shipwreck in her sonnet sequence Pamphilia to Amphilanthus (1621):

Like to a Ship on Goodwins cast by winde, / The more shee strive, more deepe in Sand is prest... (Sonnet 6, 5-6).

Herman Melville mentions them in Moby-Dick, Chapter VII, "The Chapel":

In what census of living creatures, the dead of mankind are included; why it is that a universal proverb says of them, that they tell no tales, though containing more secrets than the Goodwin Sands...

R. M. Ballantyne, the Scottish writer of adventure stories, published The Floating Light of the Goodwin Sands in 1870.

W. H. Auden quotes the phrase "to set up shop on Goodwin Sands" in his poem In Sickness and in Health. This is a proverbial expression meaning to be shipwrecked.

G. K. Chesterton's poem The Rolling English Road refers to "the night we went to Glastonbury by way of Goodwin Sands."

Charles Spurgeon mentions them in The Soul Winner, chapter 15 "Encouragement to Soul-Winners."

Their theology shifts like the Goodwin Sands, and they regard all firmness as so much bigotry.

Ian Fleming refers to the Goodwin Sands in Moonraker (1955), one of the James Bond novels, as well as making them a major plot point in his children's story Chitty-Chitty-Bang-Bang (1964–65).

The sands are depicted in the 1929 film The Lady from the Sea, which is sometimes known by the title of Goodwin Sands.

In the 2014 biographical film Mr. Turner, the first husband of the housekeeper Mrs. Booth is mentioned as having died in a boating accident at Goodwin Sands.

"Old Goodman's Farm", appearing in the Rudyard Kipling poem Brookland Road refers to the Goodwin Sands and the legend of their origin as an island belonging to Earl Godwin.

In the novel The Shivering Sands by Victoria Holt the Goodwin sands play a major plot point and the masts from wrecked ships are often sighted from the shore.

In Patrick O'Brian's Post Captain, Stephen Maturin explores the sands and must dive for his boots as the tide floods.

In the short story "Flood on the Goodwins" (1933) by Arthur Durham Divine, on a foggy night during the First World War, a German saboteur orders a British mariner at gunpoint to take him to the coast of Belgium. Instead, the mariner circles for hours and then, telling the saboteur they have reached Belgium, strands the German at low tide on the Goodwins, six miles from shore, knowing that the tide will drown the villain.

In Julian Stockwin's Invasion the Sands are both a hindrance and protection for the British fleet assembled for the rapid deployment against Napoleon's invasion armada. The protagonist Kydd even takes part in the rescue of a merchantman vessel being gale forced onto the Sands.

In Henry Williamson's The Dark Lantern, Richard Maddison's landlady lost her husband on the 'Benvenue' at The Goodwins during 'the great March gale of eighteen seventy one'.

== See also ==
- Varne Bank
- Walmer Lifeboat Station
- Maasvlakte – A notorious "ship swallower" sandbank which has now been reclaimed and part of the Port of Rotterdam.
