= MCIFA =

MCIFA may refer to:

- MCIFA, the Michael Crawford International Fan Association
- MCIfA, postnominal letters for Member of the Chartered Institute for Archaeologists
