= Peter Addyman =

British archaeologist (born 1939)

Peter Addyman CBE FSA
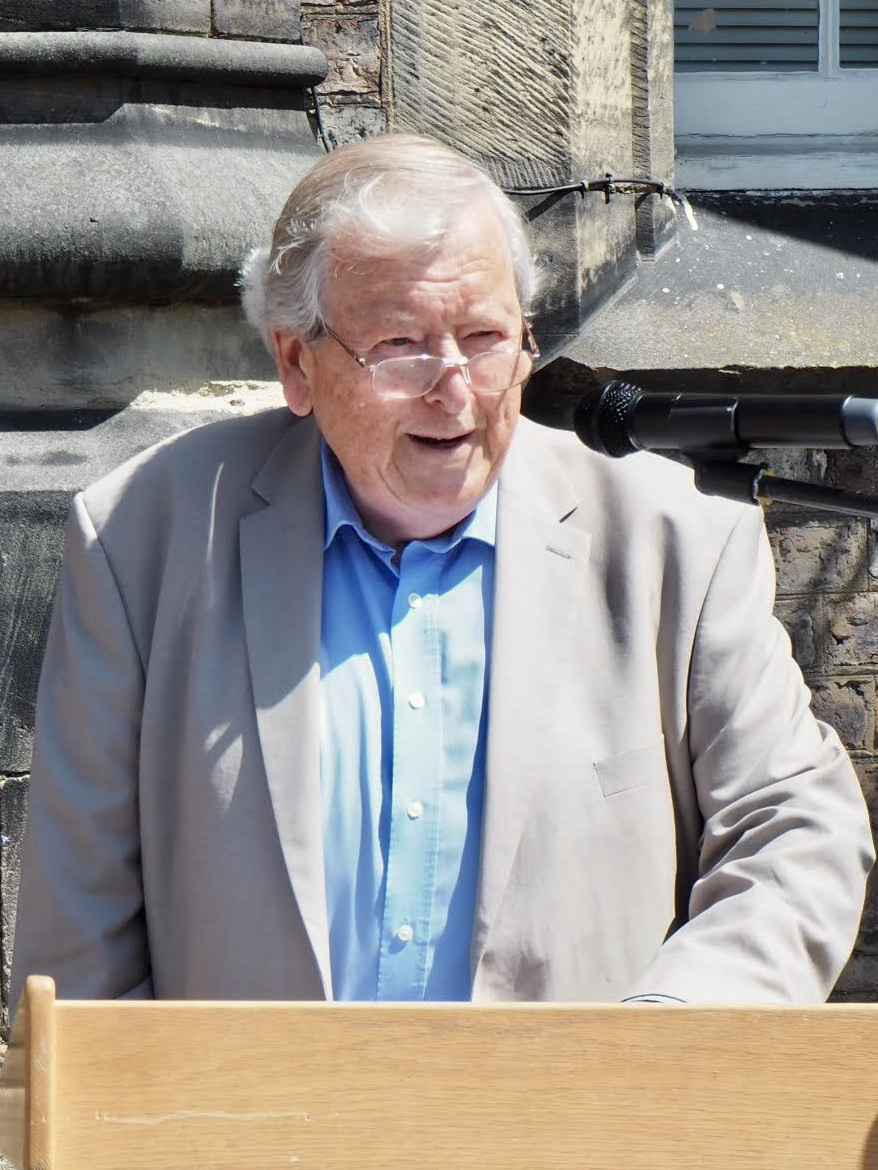
- Peter Addyman in July 2018
- Born: 12 July 1939 (age 87); Harrogate, West Riding of Yorkshire, England
- Occupation: Archaeologist
- Years active: 1962–present
- Known for: Founding Director of the York Archaeological Trust
- Awards: Commander of the Order of the British Empire; Commander of the Royal Norwegian Order of Merit; Fellow of the Society of Antiquaries of London; President's Medal of the British Academy

Academic background
- Education: University of Cambridge

Academic work
- Discipline: Archaeology
- Sub-discipline: Archaeology of Great Britain; early medieval; Anglo-Saxons; archaeology of York
- Institutions: Queen's University Belfast; University of Southampton
- Main interests: Archaeology of York, Viking Britain

Peter Vincent Addyman, CBE, FSA (born 12 July 1939), known as P. V. Addyman, is a British archaeologist who was Director of the York Archaeological Trust from 1972 to 2002. Addyman obtained a degree in archaeology at Cambridge University, after which he lectured at Queen's University Belfast and the University of Southampton, while also conducting excavations. In 1972 he was offered the directorship of the newly founded York Archaeological Trust, the creation of which he had proposed; along with excavation work in York, he oversaw the development of the Jorvik Viking Centre, the Archaeological Resource Centre, and Barley Hall. In 2000 he was appointed a Commander of the Order of the British Empire.

== Early life and education ==
Peter Vincent Addyman was born on 12 July 1939 to Erik Thomas Waterhouse Addyman and Evelyn Mary (née Fisher), and was brought up in Harrogate, West Riding of Yorkshire (now North Yorkshire). As a child he assisted with excavations at the York Museum Gardens—"digging holes all around the Museum Gardens in a way we'd never be able to do now," as he described it, and sifting through spoil heaps to find artefacts. He attended Sedbergh School and Norwood College, at which point he and some schoolmates discovered at Underbank, near Sedbergh, a medieval village; they published a report of their excavation in the Yorkshire Archaeological Journal before graduating. After Norwood, Addyman moved on to Peterhouse at Cambridge University, obtaining a degree in archaeology, and in 1960 directing excavations at Maxey, Cambridgeshire. He took the tripos in 1961 at the same time as fellow scholar Martin Biddle.

== Career ==
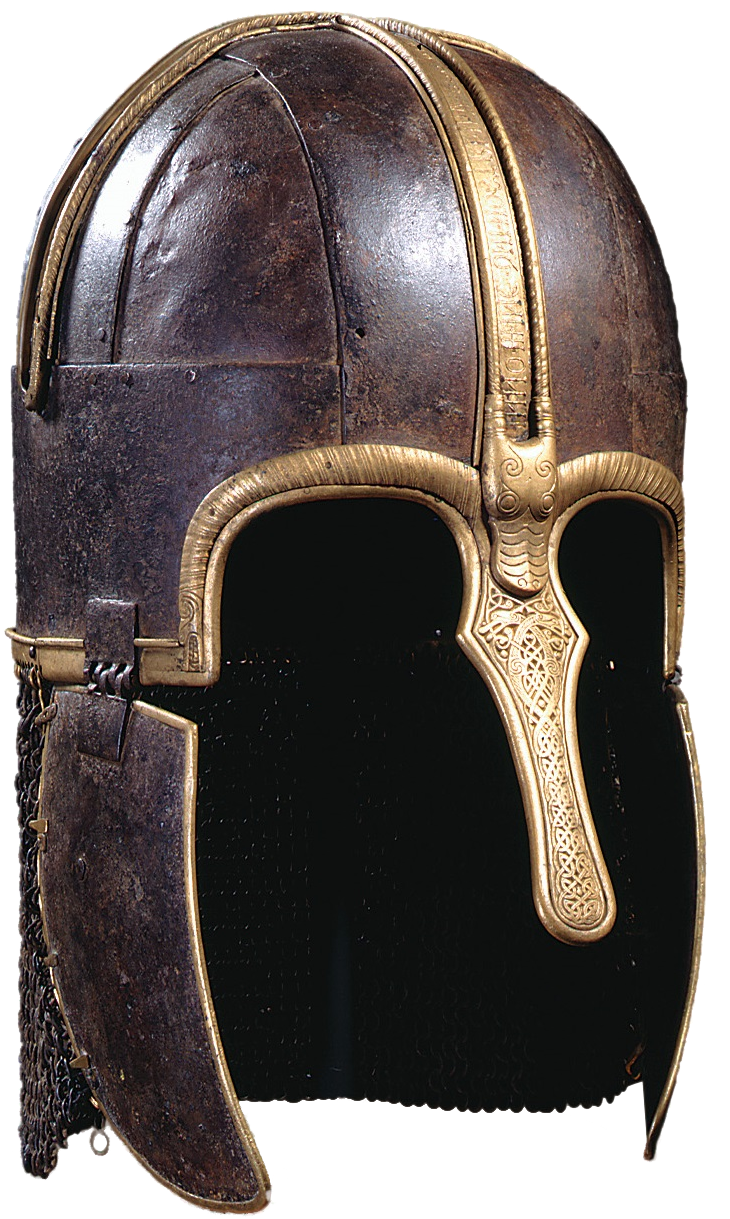
The Coppergate helmet was discovered during pre-development excavations led by Addyman.

Following his time at Cambridge, Addyman worked at Queen's University Belfast, from 1962 to 1964 as an assistant lecturer in archaeology, and then until 1967 as a lecturer. From 1967 until 1972, he taught as a junior lecturer in Archaeology at the University of Southampton. During this time he variously directed excavations at Lydford (1964–1967), Ludgershall Castle (1964–1972), and Chalton (1970–1972).

Addyman's path was bent towards academia when in 1971 he was commissioned to analyse the impact of a proposed road in York. His resulting report suggested the city establish an archaeological unit for excavations, suggesting it would serve both educational and touristic purposes. Money was found for the unit; he was offered the directorship; and from its founding in 1972 until 2002, Addyman served as the director of the York Archaeological Trust. During that time he was responsible for archaeological excavations in York, and directed the development of the Jorvik Viking Centre, the Archaeological Resource Centre, and Barley Hall. Addyman and the Trust oversaw the publication of more than 60 volumes about the archaeology of York, and added tens of thousands of items to their collection. The Anglo-Saxon Coppergate helmet was discovered during excavations in 1976–1981 prior to the building of Coppergate Shopping Centre, inspiring several of Addyman's publications.

Addyman retired from the York Archaeological Trust on 30 September 2002, exactly 30 years after taking charge. "Archaeologists retire to do archaeology," he said at the time; he is currently the chairman of the Malton Museum Foundation, a position he has held since 2012, the president of the York Civic Trust, and since 2007 the director of Continuum Group Ltd.

In addition to his primary occupations, Addyman has served in various capacities for many organisations. From 1981 to 1983 he served as the vice-president of the Council for British Archaeology, and from 1992 until 1995 as its president. He was also the vice-president of the Royal Archaeological Institute from 1979 until 1983. In addition to his current chairmanship, he was the chairman of the Standing Conference of Archaeological Unit Managers from its 1975 founding until 1978, the Institute of Field Archaeologists from 1983 to 1985, Cultural Resource Management Ltd from 1989 to 1995 (and director from 1979 to 1995), the Standing Conference on Portable Antiquities from 1995 to 2005, the Standing Conference on London Archaeology from 2005 to 2007, the Yorkshire Dales Landscape Research Trust from 2006 until 2016, and York Civic Trust from 2012 until 2015, and thereafter as the president. Addyman was a member of the Royal Commission on the Historical Monuments of England from 1997 to 1999, the Ancient Monuments Advisory Committee from 1998 to 2001, the Places of Worship Panel from 2001 to 2004, and, currently of English Heritage. From 1984 to 2007 he was the academic director of Heritage Projects Ltd, and he was the president of the Yorkshire Archaeological Society from 1999 to 2005 and the Yorkshire Philosophical Society from 1999 until 2013. He also served as a trustee of the National Coal Mining Museum from 1995 until 2002, and as governor of the Company of Merchant Adventurers of York from 2006 to 2007.

In 1998 he was made an honorary professor at both the University of Bradford and the University of York. Bradford had previously awarded him an honorary Doctor of Science in 1984, and York a DUniv in 1985.

== Honours ==
In the 2000 Birthday Honours, Addyman was appointed a Commander of the Order of the British Empire for services to archaeology. In 2004 he was made a Commander of the Royal Norwegian Order of Merit. He is a Fellow of the Society of Antiquaries of London (FSA), a position to which he was elected on 2 March 1967. In 2015 he was one of four individuals awarded the President's Medal by the British Academy, alongside Darren Henley, Elizabeth Livingstone, and Michael Wood.

In 2008, Addyman was named an Honorary Freeman of the city of York. This award is for those who have served York with distinction, or with notable links to the city; others who have received the award include Joyce Pickard, Sir Ron Cooke, and Dame Janet Baker. Addyman was given a vellum scroll, and the right to drive three sheep or beasts over the historic Ouse Bridge, and to graze three beasts on Knavesmire in the city. As he said when receiving the award, "These are very useful things and I expect to use these prerogatives very soon."

== Sackler Lectures ==
In 2012, Raymond Sackler and his wife Beverly endowed a series of lectures in honour of Norman Hammond. These lectures are held annually at Peterhouse, Cambridge, UK and are co-hosted by the McDonald Institute for Archaeological Research. The first Raymond and Beverly Sackler distinguished lecture in Archaeology in honour of Norman Hammond was given at Peterhouse on 4 November 2015 by Addyman on "Creating Heritage: Vikings, Jorvik and Public Interest archaeology.

== Personal life ==
In 1965, Addyman married Shelton "Shelly" Addyman (née Oliver). She died on 25 November 2016; the two had met while he was excavating an Anglo-Saxon village in Devon as a research assistant at Queen's University Belfast, and she was a doctoral student from Atlanta, Georgia. He has a son and a daughter.

== Publications ==
- Addyman, Peter V. (28 August 1982). "The Coppergate Helmet". Archaeology. Illustrated London News. No. 7, 009. p. 53.
- Addyman, Peter V.; Pearson, Nicholas & Tweddle, Dominic (November 1982). "The Coppergate helmet". Antiquity. LVI (218): 189–194. doi:10.1017/S0003598X00054673. S2CID 54050677.
- Addyman, Peter V. (May 1984). "Jorvik: Rebirth of a City". History Today. 34 (5).
- Addyman, Peter V. (December 2006). "Early Days at Bradford and York" (PDF). From Artefacts to Anomalies: Papers Inspired by the Contribution of Arnold Aspinall.
- Addyman, Peter V. (February 2016). "Creating Heritage: Vikings, Jorvik and Public Interest Archaeology" (PDF). British Academy Review. 27: 12–16.
