= Archaeological Association =

The Archaeological Association may refer to:

- The British Archaeological Association
- The Cambrian Archaeological Association
- The Canadian Archaeological Association
- The Australian Archaeological Association
- The Japanese Archaeological Association
- The Royal Historical and Archaeological Association of Ireland, a former name of the Royal Society of Antiquaries of Ireland
- The Athens Archaeological Association
- The Archaeological Association, a former name of the Grand Ducal Institute's Historical Section in Luxembourg
- Deutsche Gesellschaft für Ur- und Frühgeschichte (German Society for Pre- and Protohistory)

== See also ==
- Archaeological association
