= Register of Professional Archaeologists =

The Register of Professional Archaeologists (RPA) is a professional organization of (primarily North American) archaeologists headquartered in Baltimore, MD. Members of the RPA agree to follow a standard code of research ethics and conduct and must be formally approved for membership by a panel of elected colleagues. Similar to organizations elsewhere, such as the Chartered Institute for Archaeologists or Australian Association of Consulting Archaeologists, the Register is a mechanism for enforcing archaeological standards, particularly among the large numbers working in cultural resources management.

To be accepted into the RPA, applicants must hold a graduate degree in anthropological archaeology (or related discipline) from an accredited institution and have completed a thesis focused on an archaeological topic. Once approved, members who pay their annual dues are granted the title of Registered Professional Archaeologist (RPA), the initials of which are typically placed as post-nominal letters after their surname (e.g., Jane Doe, MA, RPA). This certifies that they meet the accepted training and experience to lead archaeological projects on their own (and are current with their annual membership). At the start of 2019, the RPA's directory contained 3012 RPAs worldwide, with 2811 located in the United States.

Aside from maintaining the Code of Conduct (below), the RPA also maintains a list of certified archaeological field schools, a database of archaeological ethics (e.g., codes adopted by other archaeological organizations), and adjudicates on member misconduct (a process called the "grievance procedure"). As discussed below, the grievance procedure is a mechanism for holding archaeologists accountable for their conduct in the field (triggered by complaint only).

== History ==
The history of archaeology in the US is rooted in the part-time enthusiasm of, usually wealthy, Antiquarians who formed the field's initial foundation. By the start of the Great Depression, the field was mostly practiced by a small group of elite academics with varying levels of research standards. Following large numbers of archaeologists trained and employed by the WPA and the subsequent swelling of many academic disciplines by GI Bill servicemen after WWII, the need for standards of conduct was increasing. By the 1960s, the New Archaeology was revolutionizing American archaeology to more statistically and scientifically-oriented methods, which carried over to the burgeoning sector of federally-mandated archaeological impact assessments, particularly after NHPA 1966 and subsidiary legislation. Since archaeology is controlled destruction, where the context of the materials is largely destroyed in the process, the rising number of those practicing archaeology increased the need for a professional certification process.

In 1976, the Society of Professional Archaeologists (SOPA) was founded as a means of vetting and enforcing the accepted standards of archaeological research. These standards set the practical and ethical expectations for archaeological research (e.g., for scientifically-based field methods, prompt reporting, the treatment and curation of artifacts, and aversion to monetary valuation of artifacts). In 1998, SOPA was reorganized and renamed the Register of Professional Archaeologists (RPA), per a joint task-force en-paneled by the Society for American Archaeology, the Society for Historical Archaeology, and the American Institute of Archaeology. The change in name was intended to emphasize the organization's refocus towards professional members (rather than amateurs or students) and to de-emphasize conference and publication services already offered by sponsoring organizations. A representative of the RPA sits on the Board of these and other sponsoring organizations.

== Standards of Research and Code of Conduct ==
The Register maintains the primary standards of research and conduct for archaeologists working in North America. As mentioned above, these standards set the practical and ethical considerations for behavior and research in office as well as in field and laboratory settings.

The current (as of 2019) Code of Conduct lays out responsibilities of RPAs towards the public, the archaeological community, and employers/clients. RPAs responsibility to the public includes making results accessible upon completion, maintaining sensitivity towards affected tribes and groups, refraining from uninformed opinions in a professional capacity, refraining from fraud or illegal activities (including commercial sale or excavation of antiquities), and complying with national and international conventions such as UNESCO 1970. Additional responsibilities towards the archaeological community include properly crediting work by others, staying informed of recent developments in the field, refraining from maligning the reputation of colleagues, and providing a working environment free of any harassment (be it verbal, sexual, discriminatory, etc) and intervening when witnessing such behavior. With clients and employers, it is also critical to protect confidential information and refrain from any violation of RPA's ethical codes or standards.

The current (as of 2019) Standards of Research lays out the baseline definition of legitimate archaeological research. Sections of the Standards include 1) adequate preparation (via background research, planning, staffing, and complying with local and national permissions), 2) methodological integrity, 3) survey and excavation procedures, 4) record keeping, 5) storage of written and material results, and 6) dissemination of results (e.g., within 10 years of field research). While not extensive, it is expected that qualified RPAs are aware of the relevant background literature for each of the points raised in both the Code and the Standards.

== Related ==
- Society for American Archaeology
- Society for Historical Archaeology
- Australasian Society for Historical Archaeology
- Chartered Institute for Archaeologists
- European Association of Archaeologists
- Federation of Archaeological Managers and Employers
- Korean Archaeological Society
