= Robina McNeil =

Archaeologist

Robina McNeil FSA MIFA
- Born: 1950
- Died: 2007 (aged 56–57)

Academic background
- Education: University College London

Academic work
- Institutions: Greater Manchester Archaeological Unit (GMAU) (1987–2007)

Robina McNeil (1950–2007) was a leading landscape and industrial archaeologist, making a major contribution to understandings of Manchester's industrial past. She was an accredited Member of the Chartered Institute for Archaeologists, a Fellow of the Society of Antiquaries of London and, by time of her death in 2007, was the County Archaeologist for Greater Manchester.

== Education ==
Robina undertook her degree at the Institute of Archaeology, University College London, graduating in 1972.

== Career and research ==
After completing her degree, Robina began her career in Chester with the North West Archaeological Trust, working on archaeological sites around Cheshire and North Wales on which she published extensively. In 1987 she moved to work for the Greater Manchester Archaeological Unit, based at the University of Manchester, where she progressed from Senior Field Officer to become Head of the Unit and County Archaeologist for Greater Manchester by the time of her death in 2007.

Throughout her career Robina pioneered a range of important projects for the heritage of Manchester and the North West of England including acting as the leading archaeologist for the bid to make Manchester a World Heritage Site in 2002, editor of the Greater Manchester Heritage Atlas and a leading figure in establishing the European Route of Industrial Heritage, including leading the pilot for this in the North West of England.

Robina came from an artistic background and she drew on this in her research and interpretations of the past, to understand how space was used and explore creative ways of communicating the past.

== Selected publications ==
Robina had an extensive publication record, authoring four major monographs and over thirty articles, reports and chapters. Her notable publications include:

- Nevell, M. D. and McNeil-Sale, R. (2000). A guide to the industrial archaeology of Greater Manchester. Association for Industrial Archaeology.
- McNeil-Sale, R. and Walker, J. S F., eds. (2002). Manchester -- archetype city of The Industrial Revolution. University of Manchester Archaeological Unit.
