= Charles Frederic Watkins =

English Anglican clergyman

Charles Frederic Watkins (1794–1873) was an Anglican clergyman, best known for his work in restoring the parish church of Brixworth, Northamptonshire, and promoting the study of its origins.

== Background and career ==
He was born at Corsley, Wiltshire, where he was baptised on 16 January 1794, a son of William and Jane Watkins and had an unusual career path. He was educated at Christ's Hospital and in 1810 joined the frigate "Hotspur" as a midshipman, continuing to serve in the Navy until the end of the Napoleonic Wars. Following study at Christ's College, Cambridge, he was ordained deacon and priest in 1818 and licensed as stipendiary curate at Downton, Wiltshire, in the same year. In 1820 he became curate at Windsor and two years later was appointed master of Farley College, Salisbury.

He was instituted as vicar of All Saints' Church, Brixworth, Northamptonshire on 27 April 1832 and retained that position for the rest of his life.

Watkins was the clergyman encountered by Robert George Gammage when he visited Brixworth in June 1839 in order to address a Chartist meeting. Gammage first attended a service at Brixworth church and recalled a disagreement with the clergyman who conducted it. Later in the day, the minister unsuccessfully attempted to secure the arrest of those who spoke at the Chartist meeting. Gammage’s account includes evidence of the clergyman’s attitude to the Tolpuddle Martyrs. When he visited Brixworth on a later occasion, Gammage found less clerical opposition and recalled that "There was no fear this time of an arrest. Mr. Watkins had regained his equanimity, finding that his good old church still stood in its accustomed place."

The 1851 census records Watkins living at Brixworth vicarage with his wife Elizabeth, eight daughters and two sons, all the children then being taught at home. The resident servants were a cook and two housemaids.

Watkins’ concerns extended beyond the basic duties of a country vicar. He took great interest in the historical development of the church building at Brixworth, both by carrying out excavations of submerged parts of the oldest elements and by initiating changes that aimed to restore the structure to be closer to what he believed was its original form. The most substantial building works during his incumbency at Brixworth took place in 1865-66, involving the removal of a large part of the medieval chancel and exposure of the ambulatory below ground level that surrounded the apse at the east end of the building. The south-east chapel was shortened by one bay and the south porch demolished, in each case to expose earlier stonework. The work included the provision of 247 additional free seats. The church was reopened after completion of the works on 11 July 1866. The two services held at Brixworth on that day attracted some 500 to 600 persons. Watkins composed six special hymns for the occasion and included their words along with a detailed account of the day in his book “The Basilica or Palatial Hall of Justice and Sacred Temple etc.”.

== Literary works ==
In the earlier part of his ministry, Watkins composed a number of poems. In addition to these, he wrote about his views on the origins of the universe and on aspects of the history of Brixworth church, being the author of publications that included:

- Eidespernox (1821)
- Sacred Poems etc. (1829)
- The Infants’ Death, a sacred poem (1829)
- A Treatise on the Leading Causes of Pleasure and Delight in the Human Mind etc. (1841)
- The Human Hand etc. (1852)
- The Twins of Fame (1854)
- A Scientific and General Vindication of the Mosaic History of Creation Adapted to All Capacities (1867)
- The Basilica or Palatial Hall of Justice and Sacred Temple: Its Nature, Origin, and Purport, and a Description and History of the Basilican Church of Brixworth (1867)
- The Day of Days (1872)

== Death and legacy ==
Watkins died at Brixworth on 15 July 1873. Probate of his will was granted to his widow on 20 August of the same year, the value of his effects being reported as under £600. On the following day an auction was held at the vicarage, featuring furniture, oil paintings, a library and other effects. A tomb commemorating him and his wife Elizabeth, who died aged 77 at Watford, Hertfordshire on 3 August 1886, stands in Brixworth churchyard. All of the windows on the north side of the nave and three in the apse of Brixworth church commemorate members of the Watkins family.

At the time of the 1881 census, Elizabeth Watkins and her unmarried daughters Georgiana and Gertrude, along with a servant, were residing at No. 36 Bromley College.
