= Peter Hinton =

British archaeologist

Peter Hinton FSA FRSA MCIfA is a British archaeologist and the current Chief Executive of the Chartered Institute for Archaeologists. Before working for the IfA he worked for the Museum of London Archaeology Service originally as a volunteer field archaeologist and eventually specialising as a post excavation manager. He started working for the IfA in 1997 after being actively involved since 1987. Hinton retired from his role as CEO of CIfA in June 2024. Tributes to him on his retirement highlighting his role in development of the archaeological profession and professional standards included the chair The Historic Environment Forum (HEF) Dr Adrian Olivier and the CEO of the Professional Associations Research Network Andy Friedman.

He was elected a Fellow of the Society of Antiquaries on 10 October 2003, he is also a Fellow of the Society of Antiquaries of Scotland and the Royal Society of Arts.
