= Robert George Gammage =

English surgeon and Chartist (c.1821 – 1888)

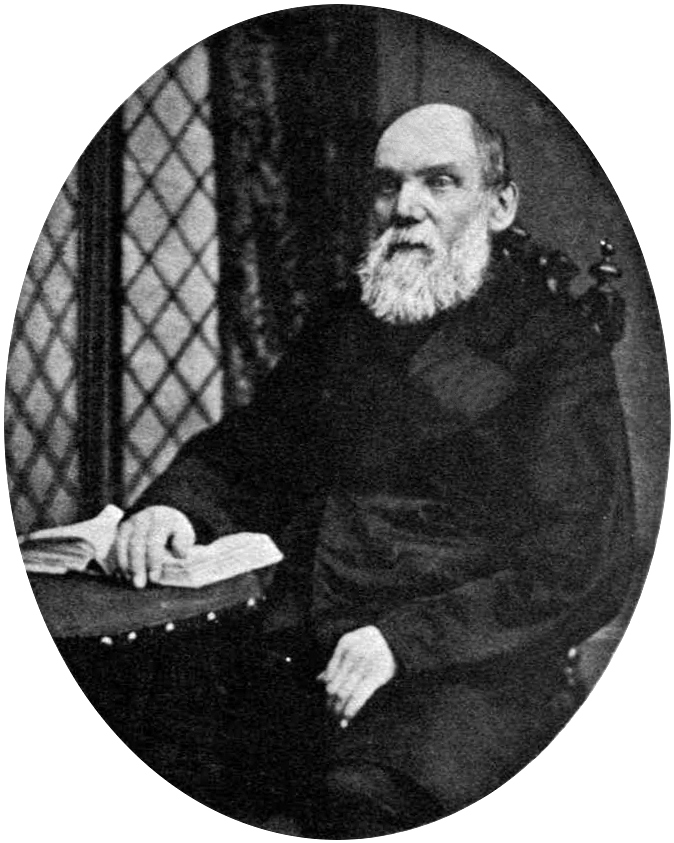
Robert George Gammage

Robert George Gammage (c. 1821 – 7 January 1888) was a British surgeon and leading figure in Chartism in the 1830s and 1840s. He was also the author of the first history of the movement.

== Early years ==
Robert George Gammage was born in Northampton around 1821, the son of Charlotte and Robert Gammage. He was baptised 13 February 1821. Aged 12, he started an informal apprenticeship with a local coachbuilder. He was a founding member of the Northampton branch of the Chartist "Working Men's Association". He began speaking at public meetings and as a result lost his job. He began travelling simply to find work, but became increasingly active as a Chartist lecturer.

In June 1839, he walked the six miles from Northampton to the village of Brixworth in order to address a public meeting. Before the meeting was held, Gammage and two companions attended a service in the parish church where the clergyman (Charles Frederic Watkins, who was vicar of Brixworth from 1832 to 1873) rebuked them and threatened the three with arrest if the meeting proceeded. Despite this, Gammage recalled that attendance at the roadside assembly later that day amounted to several hundreds and the minister’s efforts to persuade the constable to arrest those addressing it were unsuccessful.

He left Northampton on 6 February 1840 and went first to Newport Pagnell and stayed at the Coachmaker's club house. He then travelled through Bedford, Ampthill, Huntingdon and Cambridge to Hertford, where he stayed with friends, and made a visit to a cousin in Hatfield he had not seen since childhood. In London he stayed for six weeks with an uncle and aunt. He moved on to Sevenoaks and Maidstone, where he had another friend from Northampton, to Tonbridge, Lewes, Brighton, Chichester, Fareham, and Southampton. In Southampton he heard about work in Portsmouth, so travelled back but was rejected because he lacked experience. He travelled on via Salisbury and Devizes to Bath, and finally to Sherbourne, where he found work.

Gammage makes it clear that both Devizes and Sherborne were very hostile to Chartism:

Every Sunday morning [in Sherborne] I received by post the Northern Star. ... Many of my friends were eager to get a look at [it], and I gratified them as best I could. Those that read it did not think that Chartism was so bad as it had often been presented.

Unfortunately, work became scarce in Sherborne and after eight months he had to set out again:

I became involved in a long and arduous search for work, and during that time felt the full force of my remark to Mr.Hill [his employer in Sherborne] on the value of a trade society to support men when seeking employment. I travelled no less than 1,400 miles in different parts of England, Wales, Scotland, and Ireland before I again obtained work.

His precise route is unclear, but he seems to have visited Halifax and Bradford, and New Year's Day, 1841 saw him in Edinburgh. He then went by boat to Ireland, visiting Belfast and Dublin. Returning to London, he finally found work in Chelmsford. He was dismissed in late 1841 for political activities, and returned to Northampton, via Ipswich and Cambridge.

The job in Northampton lasted only three months. Travelling again, he passed through Leicester, which he describes as "in a constant ferment", due to "intense distress". In Sheffield, he met the Chartist leader George Julian Harney, and in Leeds worked for seven weeks and addressed meetings there and in the surrounding townships. He stopped briefly in Harrogate, where he had an introduction from his employer in Sherborne to a coach trimmer who had moved there from Dorset, and he finally arrived in Newcastle in September 1842. It is clear that on his travels since Chelmsford, he had become increasingly active as a speaker, and in Newcastle he was advised to take up lecturing as a Chartist orator regularly.

== Chartist politics ==
Gammage travelled very extensively in the autumn of 1842 and in 1843, passing through the north west, the midlands, and the south to arrive in London by Christmas. He visited the south west and south in the early spring of 1843, the east midlands, Yorkshire, and Lancashire in the early summer, Scotland in the autumn, finally returning to Newcastle in November 1843. He remained in the north east for several months in early 1844, having developed links with radicals there, but returned to Northampton by the end of the year.

He moved to Stony Stratford in 1845, following an argument with the Northampton Chartists, working first as a hawker and then as a shoemaker. In 1848, he became involved in the upsurge in popular agitation, lost his job, and moved again to Buckingham. In this period he lectured in many towns in the area.

A further period of inactivity ended in 1852, when he was elected onto the executive of the National Chartist Association. Following this, he again travelled extensively as a speaker and his reminiscences include detailed descriptions of some of these journeys. He was a candidate at Cheltenham in the General Election of 1852. In 1854, he fell out with Ernest Jones and was not re-elected onto the Chartist executive. He then moved to Newcastle and Sunderland, where he spent the years 1854–87, qualifying as a doctor and working mainly for friendly societies.

In 1874, he was one of the founders of the Manhood Suffrage League. In 1887, he was forced to retire because of ill health, and returned to Northampton. He died there on 7 January 1888 after a fall that occurred while walking to get out of the way of a tram.

== Gammage as a historian ==
Gareth Stedman Jones, writing in the 1980s, includes Gammage among the "first generation of Chartist historians", who "concentrated disproportionately upon rifts in organisation and the angry and divisive battles between leading personalities".

== Vegetarianism ==
Gammage was a vegetarian. In 1857, he won a prize essay competition conducted by the Vegetarian Society, with his essay "The best Methods of Promoting the Stability and Zeal of Members of the Vegetarian Society, with suggestions for removing the Hostilities of their Families to the Practice of Vegetarianism". He also authored "Vegetarianism and the Improvement of Society" in the same year.
