= List of lakes and lochs of the United Kingdom =

The list of lakes, lochs, loughs and llyns of the United Kingdom is a link page for some large lakes of the United Kingdom (England, Scotland, Wales and Northern Ireland), including lochs fully enclosed by land.

Lakes in Scotland are called lochs, and in Northern Ireland loughs (pronounced the same way, i.e. (/lɒç/)). In Wales a lake is called a llyn. The words "loch" and "lough", in addition to referring to bodies of freshwater ("lakes"), are also applied to bodies of brackish water or seawater, which in other countries or contexts may be called fjord, firth, estuary, bay etc. In particular, the term "sea-loch" is used in Scotland in this way, as the English language equivalent of 'fjord'. (There are many examples, including Loch Carron, Loch Torridon etc.)

Some of the largest lakes in England and Wales are man-made reservoirs or lakes whose size has been increased by damming.

== Largest water bodies in the United Kingdom ==
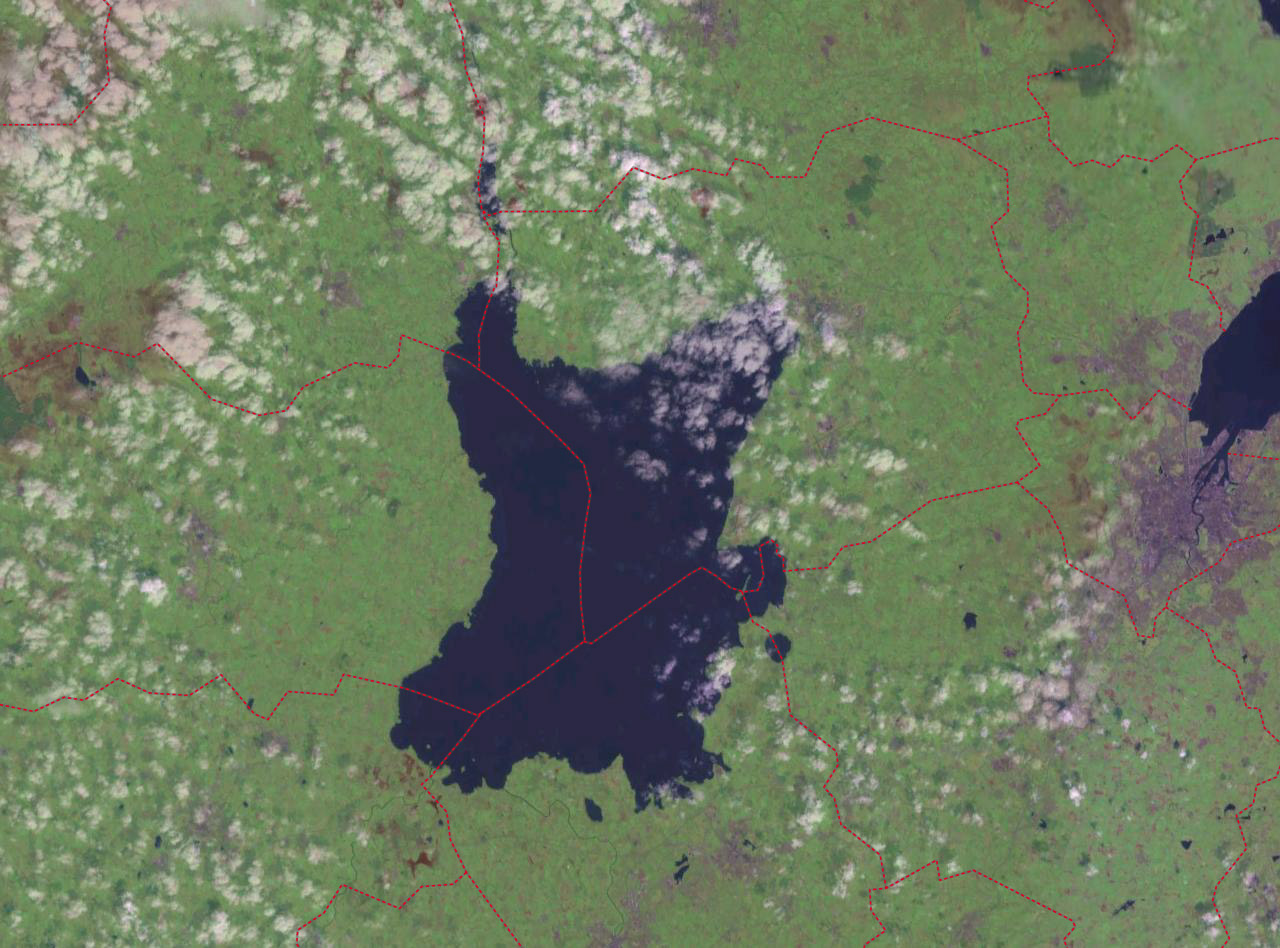
NASA Landsat image of Lough Neagh

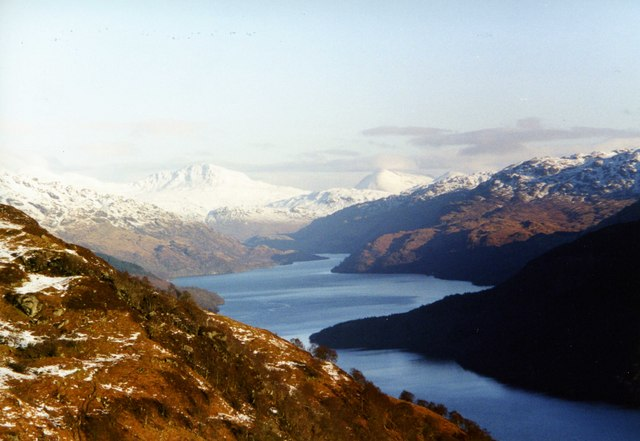
Loch Lomond in winter

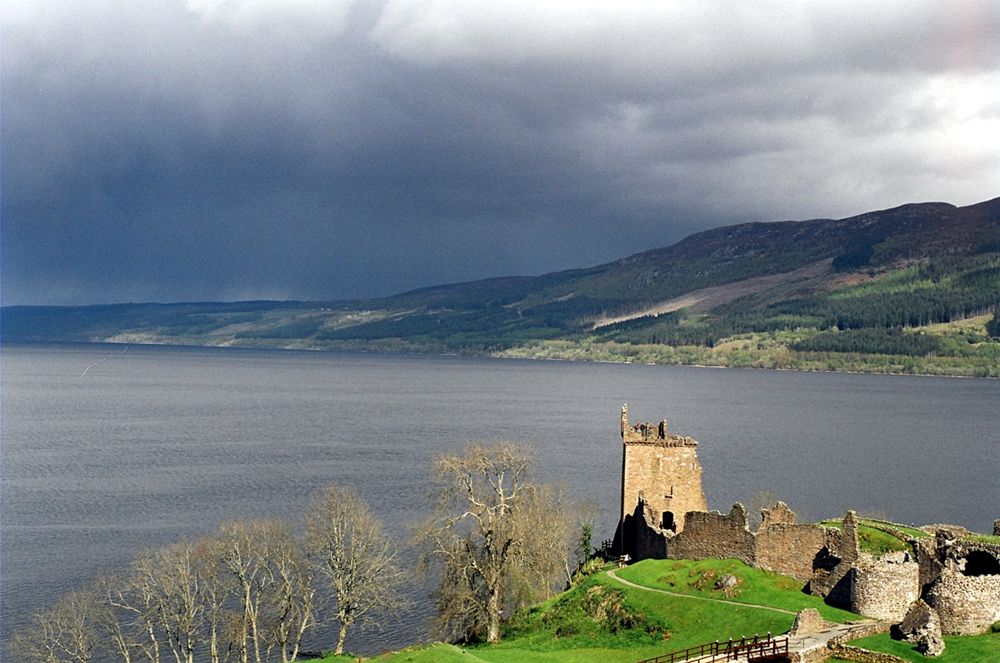
Loch Ness With Urquhart Castle in the foreground

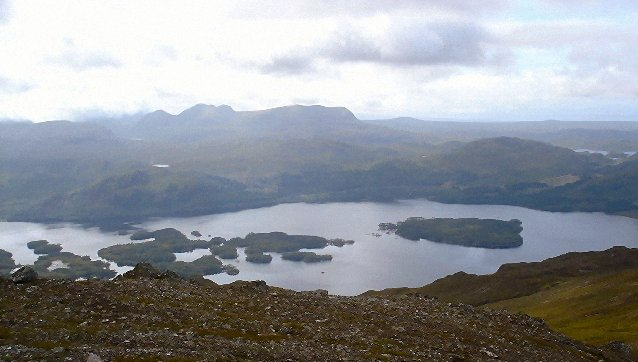
The islands of Loch Maree

This table includes the ten largest fresh water bodies by area. Lough Neagh is the largest water body in the UK by this measure, although Loch Ness is the largest by volume and contains nearly double the amount of water in all the lakes of England and Wales combined. Loch Morar is the deepest of the UK's lakes and Loch Awe the longest. Murray and Pullar (1910) note that the mean depth of Loch Ness is 57.4% of the maximum depth – higher than in any other large deep loch in Scotland. The deepest lake in England is Wast Water which descends to 76 metres (249 ft).

Rank	Name	Location	Area (mi^{2})	Area (km^{2})	Volume (km^{3})	Length (km)	Max. depth (m)	Mean depth (m)
1	Lough Neagh	Northern Ireland	147.87	383	3.528	30	25	9
2	Lower Lough Erne	Northern Ireland	42.28	109.5	1.3	29	62	11.9
3	Loch Lomond	Scotland	27.45	71	2.6	36	190	37
4	Loch Ness	Scotland	21.78	56	7.45	39	230	132
5	Loch Awe	Scotland	14.85	39	1.2	41	94	32
6	Upper Lough Erne	Northern Ireland	13.3	34.5	< 0.35	19	< 60	2.3
7	Loch Maree	Scotland	11.03	28.6	1.09	20	114	38
8	Loch Morar	Scotland	10.3	27	2.3	18.8	310	87
9	Loch Tay	Scotland	10.19	26.4	1.6	23	150	60.6
10	Loch Shin	Scotland	8.7	22.5	0.35	27.8	49	15.5

== Largest natural lakes in England ==
Rank	Lake	Area (km^{2})	Area (mi^{2})
1	Windermere	14.7	5.69
2	Ullswater	8.9	3.44
3=	Bassenthwaite Lake	5.3	2.06
3=	Derwent Water	5.3	2.06
5	Coniston Water	4.9	1.89

== Largest natural lakes in Wales ==
These are largely 'natural' but some have minor modifications to regulate their outflow.

Rank	Lake	Area (km^{2})	Area (mi^{2})
1	Llyn Tegid (Bala Lake)	4.8	1.87
2	Llangorse Lake	1.5	0.59
3	Llyn Cowlyd	1.1	0.42
4	Llyn Padarn	0.98	0.38
5	Tal-y-llyn Lake	0.89	0.34
6	Llyn Cwellyn	0.87	0.34
7	Llyn Llywenan	0.52	0.20
8	Kenfig Pool	0.28	0.11

== Largest reservoirs in the United Kingdom ==
Rank	Lake	Area (km^{2})	Area (mi^{2})	County	Country
1	Rutland Water	12.6	4.86	Rutland	England
2	Kielder Water	11.0	4.25	Northumberland	England
3	Lake Vyrnwy	8.2	3.18	Powys	Wales
4=	Pitsford Water	7.4	2.85	Northamptonshire	England
4=	Grafham Water	7.4	2.85	Cambridgeshire	England
6	Chew Valley Lake	4.9	1.88	Somerset	England
7	Llyn Trawsfynydd	4.8	1.84	Gwynedd	Wales
8	Clywedog Reservoir	4.0	1.55	Powys	Wales
9	Carron Valley	3.9	1.51	Stirlingshire	Scotland
10	Haweswater	3.9	1.50	Cumbria	England
11=	Derwent Reservoir	3.7	1.44	County Durham & Northumberland	England
11=	Llyn Brenig	3.7	1.44	Conwy & Denbighshire	Wales
13	Colliford Lake	3.6	1.4	Cornwall	England
14=	Thirlmere	3.2	1.25	Cumbria	England
14=	Llyn Celyn	3.2	1.25	Gwynedd	Wales

== See also ==
- List of lakes in England
- List of Irish loughs
- List of lochs in Scotland
- List of lakes in Wales
- List of lakes in the Lake District
- Geography of the United Kingdom
