= Rooswijk =

Dutch East India Company ship

Coordinates: 51°16′27″N 01°34′32″E

History
- Name: Rooswijk
- Owner: Dutch East India Company
- Launched: 1737
- Fate: Sunk on 9 January 1740

Rooswijk (Dutch pronunciation: [ˈroːsʋɛik]) was a merchant ship belonging to the VOC (Dutch East India Company) that was wrecked off the coast of England in January 1740. The wreck is a Protected Wreck managed by Historic England.

== Construction and service ==
Rooswijk was built for the VOC "Chamber of Amsterdam" in 1737. On 9 January 1740, during her second journey to the East Indies, she ran aground and sank on the Goodwin Sands, about 8 km from the British mainland in the Strait of Dover. There were no known survivors. At the time, the ship was captained by Daniel Ronzieres. By examining archival documents, researchers have been able to identify 19 of the 237 crewmen on board, including Gerrit Hendrick Huffelman, responsible for providing medical care; Thomas Huijdekoper, a 19-year-old on his first voyage; and Pieter Calmer, a sailor who had previously survived the Westerwijk shipwreck.

== Wreck ==
The wreck of the Rooswijk was discovered on the Goodwin Sands by an amateur diver in 2004. It lies in about 24 metres (79 ft) of water at the northeast end of Kellett Gut.

In December 2005, it was made public that between May and September of that year a team led by Rex Cowan had recovered some of the ship and its contents. This was done in secrecy to avoid attracting looters. Artifacts recovered included approximately one thousand bars of silver, gold coins, and a mustard jar. When the VOC was disbanded in 1798, its possessions fell to the Batavian Republic, the legal successor of which is the current Dutch State, which therefore is entitled to the objects recovered from the Rooswijk. They were presented to Junior Minister of Finance Joop Wijn in Plymouth on 11 December 2005.

The type of coins recovered were several hundred Mexican silver cobs of the 1720s and early 1730s and transitional klippes of 1733–1734, as well as many more hundreds of "pillar dollars" and a smattering of cobs from other mints. However, archaeologists have determined that up to half of the money on board was intended for illegal trade, as they were not part of the sanctioned cargo. Many of the discovered coins were also made with small deliberate holes, which suggest that crewmen were sewing them into their clothes to smuggle to the Dutch East Indies. Crewmen were able to make a profit off of buying silver in the Netherlands and then selling it in the Dutch East Indies, where there were no silver mines. Despite being illegal, the VOC tolerated the smuggling because the profits benefited both the smugglers and the company.

After the wreck, the floor timbers collapsed, causing the decks of the ship to fall on top of each other. This provides a snapshot of the physical and social aspects of life on board in three layers: the top layer consists of the officers’ dining room; the middle layer comprises the constable’s cabin, containing 50 muskets; and the bottom layer includes the cartridge locker and gun deck, containing bar and round shot.

The 2005 salvage operation has led to criticism from heritage organisations worldwide, as some of the international principles concerning the protection of archaeological heritage (including the Valletta Treaty of 1992 and the UNESCO Convention on the Protection of the Underwater Cultural Heritage of 2001) were ignored.

In 2007, the Rooswijk was designated a protected wreck site under UK legislation which prevented further salvage work taking place. Statutory Instrument 2007/61 defines the restricted area as a circle of radius 150 m centred on 51° 16.443' N 01° 34.537' E. The Netherlands changed their policy in that same year, making it impossible to issue further salvage rights for historic shipwrecks. The ship's remains lie at a depth of some 25 metres and are owned by the Dutch government.

In 2016 the wreck was placed on Historic England’s Heritage at Risk Register. The Rooswijk was designated at high risk due to persistent erosion, shipworms attacking the wood, and the high threat of unauthorised diving. RCE and Historic England undertook a monitoring survey of the site which concluded further work was necessary. Excavation began in 2017 led by MSDS Marine. During excavation projects, new discoveries were taken to a warehouse in Ramsgate for recording and initial preservation. Further analysis and conservation took place in an Historic England storage facility before ultimately being returned to the Netherlands. Amongst the finds were a cauldron, a pan and a lid made from copper alloy.
