= The Archaeologist =

Quarterly magazine on archaeology

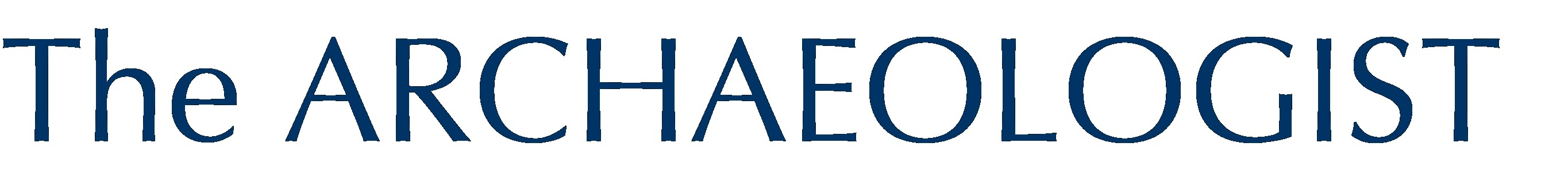
- Editor: Alison Taylor
- Categories: British Archaeology
- Frequency: Quarterly
- Publisher: Chartered Institute for Archaeologists
- First issue: February 1984
- Country: United Kingdom
- Based in: Reading
- Language: English
- Website: www.archaeologists.net

The Archaeologist is a quarterly magazine produced by the Chartered Institute for Archaeologists for its members. Non-members can purchase the magazine directly from the institute. It is edited by Alison Taylor. As well as a news round-up the magazine contains a number of articles on a theme or topic such as 'The archaeology of Roman Britain' (Spring of 2003) or 'Archaeological Field Survey' (Spring of 2007). The magazine is based in Reading.

The magazine was originally called The Field Archaeologist but the title was changed in 1996 in order to better represent the increasing volume of non-field archaeology related stories.
