= Pitsford Water =

Reservoir in Brixworth, United Kingdom

Pitsford Reservoir
- Site of Special Scientific Interest
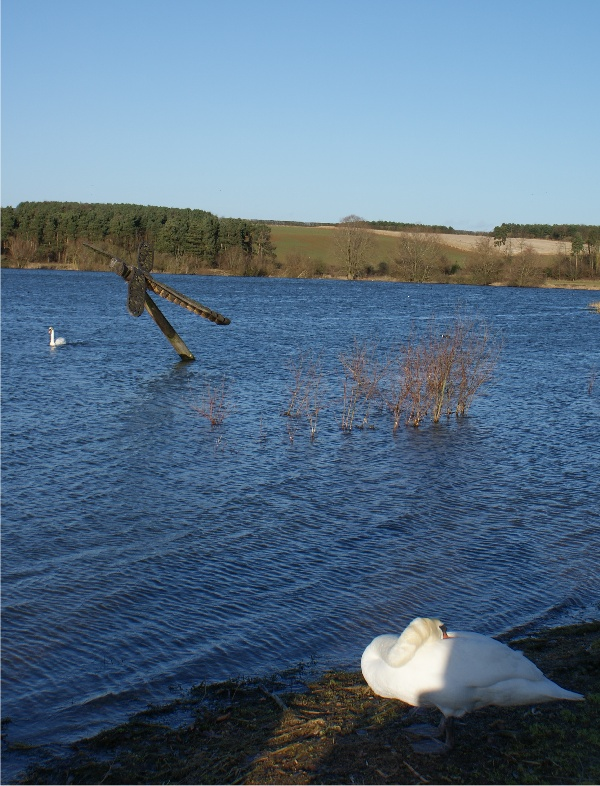
- Northern section of Pitsford Water, with mute swans and dragonfly sculpture
- Location of Pitsford Reservoir.
- Area of search: Northamptonshire
- Grid reference: SP 773 701
- Interest: Biological
- Area: 413.1 hectares
- Notification date: 1984
- Location map: [ Magic Map]

Pitsford Water or Pitsford Reservoir is a 413 hectare reservoir and biological Site of Special Scientific Interest east of Brixworth in Northamptonshire. It is owned by Anglian Water, which manages it as a water park for walking, cycling, fishing, sailing and birdwatching. An area of 181 hectares north of the causeway which divides the reservoir is the Pitsford Water Nature Reserve, which is managed by the Wildlife Trust for Bedfordshire, Cambridgeshire and Northamptonshire.

== History and location ==
The reservoir was built in 1956 to supply the town of Northampton, which is about 9.7 kilometres (6 mi) to the south. Holcot bridge was submerged when it filled and was replaced by a causeway 400 metres (0.25 mi) further south. The water is the 34th largest in England and Wales, with a surface area of 7.4 square kilometres (2.85 mi^{2}). Among artificial lakes, however, it is the fourth-largest in the United Kingdom. The reservoir is near the village of Pitsford, from which it is named. It is also close to Brixworth village and Brixworth Country Park, with Holcot on its eastern side.

== Ecology ==
This is the largest body of water in the county, and is used by wintering wildfowl, including the northern shoveler in nationally important numbers. Over 60 species of birds breed on the site, such as the great crested grebe, little grebe, teal, kingfisher and reed warbler.

== Fishing ==
The water is run as a trout fishery by Anglian Water, on a season ticket and day ticket basis, with boat hire available. Predator fishing is available in the winter months, mainly for pike. Trout are stocked at around 0.91 kg (2 lb) in weight. The Pitsford Water brown trout record was set in October 2017 by season ticket holder Bob Collins with a fish of 7 kg (15 lb).

== Access ==
There is public access to the water park, and a permit from the fishing lodge is required to visit the nature reserve.
