= Deutsche Gesellschaft für Ur- und Frühgeschichte =

Non-governmental organization

The Deutsche Gesellschaft für Ur- und Frühgeschichte e.V. (DGUF) – the German Society for Pre- and Protohistory – has more than 700 members and is thus the largest German association active in the field of prehistory and the early historical period. Its members are not only archaeology professionals but also private citizens interested in the subject. Known informally by its acronym, DGUF (pronounced dey-guf), it is the only nationwide archaeological association that also allows individual personal membership.

== DGUF – the name and origin of the society ==
The widespread student unrest in 1968 and the attendant demands for change also affected prehistory studies. Students organised the ‘Schleswiger Kreis’ (Schleswig Circle) in order to improve communication between the various institutes, strengthen interdisciplinary cooperation between archaeology and related fields of study and thus initiate new approaches to the subject. Their main objective was also evident in the title of the journal published by the Schleswig Circle between 1970 and 1976, ‘Information papers on research in fields related to prehistory studies’ (Informationsblätter zu Nachbarwissenschaften der Ur- und Frühgeschichte).

The event that led to the founding of DGUF lay elsewhere, however. In early 1969, Bolko Freiherr von Richthofen called upon all the universities in the Federal Republic to revive the "Gesellschaft für Deutsche Vorgeschichte" (the Society for German Prehistory) and create a successor to Gustaf Kossinna's "Mannusgesellschaft", which had played a leading role in the nationalist and racist orientation of German prehistory research in the Nazi period. Startled by this announcement, the members of the Schleswig Circle immediately called a meeting to determine how they could pre-empt the use of the name by third parties. As a result, 17 students and young academics from the prehistory institutes in Cologne, Marburg and Freiburg-im-Breisgau founded the "Deutsche Gesellschaft für Ur- und Frühgeschichte e.V. (DGUF)" and had the name recorded in the Register of Associations with the Bonn District Court on 27 October 1969. The Mannusgesellschaft, re-founded by Bolko von Richthofen, then switched to the name Gesellschaft für Vor- und Frühgeschichte (Bonn), in 1994, the revived journal Mannus was discontinued, after just 24 issues.

== Objectives and activities ==
DGUF has always seen itself as an independent association of prehistory professionals who, together with other concerned citizens, support and promote the interests of archaeology – also vis-à-vis the more established institutions and relevant political circles. On a European level, in particular, DGUF seeks to influence the formulation of Directives and legislative procedures. Ever since it was founded in 1969, DGUF has remained true to its principles of encouraging new developments in archaeology, autonomy from the established archaeological institutions and a critical approach to history – even its own.

The society considers itself a platform for the exchange of ideas and cooperation in the field of pre- and protohistory – from the protection of cultural landscapes to the discussion of the archaeological aspects of different periods, the promotion of archaeological interests among the general public and the enlightenment of the relevant political authorities. In the overall domain of German archaeology, DGUF is a leader in the presentation of the concerns of professional archaeology to the general public as well as the clarification of issues relating to university curricula and careers in archaeology.

In addition to selective cooperations with external partners, DGUF maintains longterm partnerships based on mutual agreements to reach their goals. From 2011 to 2019 they have been member of the German umbrella organization Deutscher Verband der Archäologie (DVA) and, based on a "memorandum of understanding", they entered into new European partnerships with the European Association of Archaeologists (EAA) and the international social-professional organisation Chartered Institute for Archaeologists (CIfA) in 2018.

== Structure ==
The society is directed by a Board consisting of three persons who are elected on a rotational basis for two-year periods. Current president is Diane Scherzler. They are assisted by co-opted committee members with specific responsibilities. Study groups are formed to deal with special topics, e.g. on the protection of cultural heritage or the foundation of a professional association for archaeologists.

== Annual conference and awards ==
One of the society's most important activities is the organisation of an annual conference, to which both members and guests are invited. The conference is always held over the three days after the Ascension holiday: academic papers are presented on the Friday and Sunday, with an excursion to archaeological sites in the vicinity of the conference venue on the Saturday. The venue varies: 1999 Constance, 2000 Dresden, 2001 Schleswig, 2002 Neuruppin, 2003 Cologne, 2004 Halle, 2005 Worms, 2006 Berlin, 2007 Basle, 2008 Mannheim, 2009 Hamburg, 2010 Aschaffenburg, 2011 Erfurt, 2012 Dresden, 2013 Erfurt, 2014 Berlin, 2015 Tübingen, 2016 Berlin, 2017 Mainz, 2018 Grünwald near Munich. In 2019, the society had its 50th anniversary in Bonn (June 20–23). Due to COVID-19, the annual meeting in 2020 was organized as virtual conference on September 3. In 2022, 2023, and 2024 the conferences took place in Frankfurt a. M.

At the meetings both awards donated by the DGUF are presented: these are the Archaeology Prize (Deutscher Archäologiepreis) and the German Students Award for Archaeology (Deutscher Studienpreis für Archäologie). The Archaeology Prize is awarded to scientists and their outstanding achievements which have forwarded the communication between science and public or the development of important methods. The study prize is awarded to students for outstanding scientific achievements or commitment in university policy.

== Publications ==
In 1972, the first issue of DGUF's own journal, Archäologische Informationen, appeared: particular features are its positive attitude towards interdisciplinary topics and the "Forum" section, in which controversial subjects are discussed in a dialogue between articles presenting the different points of view. Since 2013 the journal is published in "Platinum Open Access", all other volumes before that year which have been published only in print, in the meantime have been retro-digitized and are freely accessible. In August 2016, the DGUF signed the Berlin Declaration on Open Access to Knowledge in the Sciences and Humanities.

Since 1987, DGUF has also published a series of archaeological research reports, the Archäologische Berichte. Since volume 24 new issues are published as Open Access, while older issues are retro-digitized and given to free access step by step.

In 2017 DGUF has founded a new series of archaeological reports called "Archäologische Quellen", which is also available in Open Access.

Since 1997, the society has maintained an internet site. Since 2012 the society publishes a monthly newsletter, which is free of charge, and has accounts on Facebook, LinkedIn and X/Twitter in order to promote and discuss its activities.

== Further information ==
- Winrich Schwellnus: Bemerkungen zur Entstehung und zum Standort der Deutschen Gesellschaft für Ur- und Frühgeschichte. Archäologische Informationen 13, 1990, pp. 6–9. ISSN 0341-2873, ISBN 3-7749-2897-5
- Jörg Eckert: Die Deutsche Gesellschaft für Ur- und Frühgeschichte, der Schleswiger Kreis und der Unkeler Kreis. In: Archäologische Informationen 25, 2002, pp. 15–21. ISSN 0341-2873, ISBN 3-7749-2897-5
