= Institute of Archaeologists of Ireland =

- Institiúid Seandálaithe na hÉireann
- Formation: August 9, 2001; 25 years ago
- Type: Private
- Headquarters: 63 Merrion Square; Dublin 2 D02 TW21
- Coordinates: 53°20′18.788″N 6°14′57.285″W
- Members: 309 (2015)
- Website: iai.ie

The Institute of Archaeologists of Ireland (Irish: Institiúid Seandálaithe na hÉireann) is an Irish archaeology organisation based in Dublin, Ireland. Founded in Merrion Square, Dublin in August 2001, the organisation represents professional archaeologists who are working in the island of Ireland, both in the Republic of Ireland and in Northern Ireland.

The IAI, through the representation of its members, aims to advance and strengthen the profession of archaeology in Ireland. To attain that aim, the IAI:

- Develops and implements 3-year plans
- Promotes and develops codes of professional conduct
- Facilitates continuous professional development (CPD) for its members
- Actively engages with all stakeholders involved in the management and protection of Ireland's archaeological resource
- Works to increase public awareness and understanding of Ireland's archaeological heritage

Apart from codes of conduct, professional guidelines and technical reports, the IAI also publishes the Journal of Irish Archaeology.
