= Brixworth Country Park =

Country park in Northamptonshire, England

Coordinates: 52.322°N 0.892°W

Brixworth Country Park lies next to Pitsford Water in Northamptonshire, England.

== History ==
Brixworth Country Park was opened in 1997. the park contains 7.5 miles (12.1 km) of trail. The park is run by the West Northants Council.
