= Archaeology UK =

UK educational charity

- Council for British Archaeology
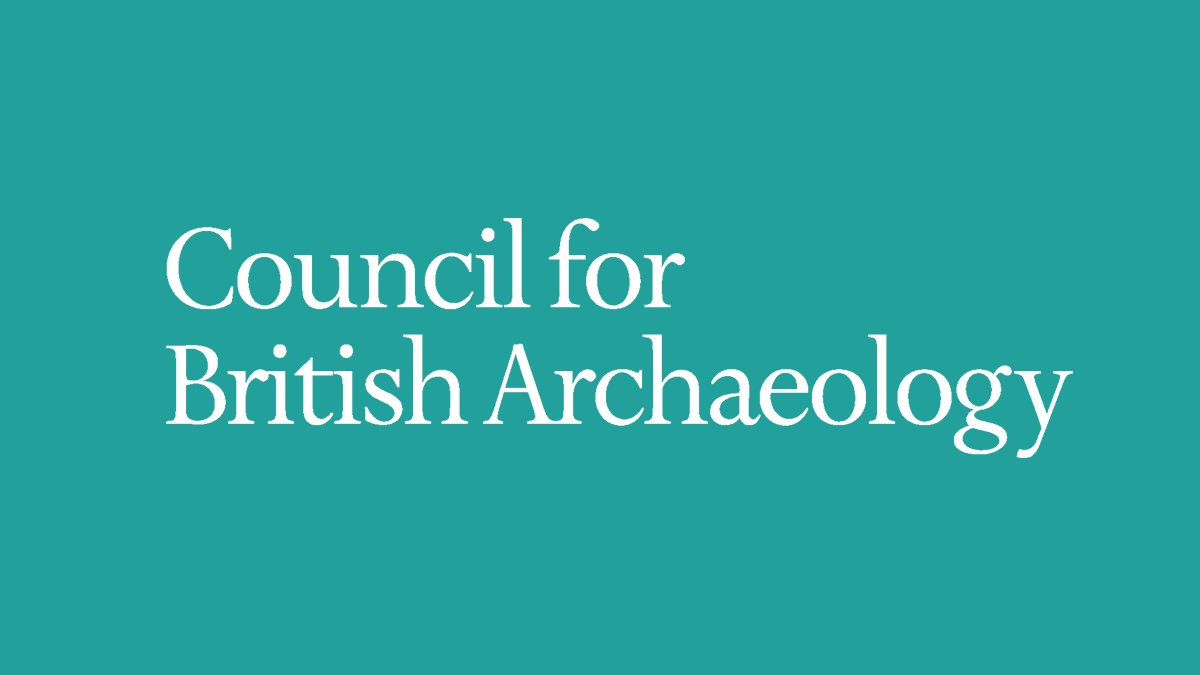
- Formation: 1944
- Headquarters: York
- Website: www.archaeologyuk.org

Archaeology UK (the operating name of the Council for British Archaeology) is an educational charity established in 1944 in the UK. It works to involve people in archaeology and to promote the appreciation and care of the historic environment for the benefit of present and future generations. It achieves this by promoting research, conservation and education, and by widening access to archaeology through events, communication, and participation.

== History and objectives ==
The origins of Archaeology UK lie in the Congress of Archaeological Societies, founded in 1898, but it was in 1943, with the tide of war turning, that archaeologists in Britain began to contemplate the magnitude of tasks and opportunities that would confront them at the end of hostilities. In London alone more than 50 acres of the City lay in ruins awaiting redevelopment, while the historic centres of Bristol, Canterbury, Exeter, Southampton, and many other towns had suffered devastation. In response to a resolution from the Oxford Meeting of the Society for the Promotion of Roman Studies, Sir Alfred Clapham, then President of the Society of Antiquaries of London, called a meeting of the Congress of Archaeological Societies "to discuss the requirements of archaeology in the post-war period". As a result, it was agreed to form a Council for British Archaeology to promote, both collectively and through its members, British archaeology in all its aspects.

The new Council defined one of its objectives as the "safeguarding of all kinds of archaeological material and the strengthening of existing measures for the care of ancient and historic buildings, monuments, and antiquities". Following its first meeting in March 1944 under Clapham's Presidency (he was succeeded later that year by Sir Cyril Fox), the Council initiated local excavation committees in a number of war-damaged towns, began to seek information about reconstruction projects, and set its Regional Groups the task of watching sites of all kinds. The Congress of Archaeological Societies was quickly wound up, and one of the tasks that the CBA inherited from it was the drawing up of a Survey and Policy for Field Research, which was seen as fundamental to an integrated approach to the exploration of Britain's heritage. This monumental task was undertaken by Christopher Hawkes and Stuart Piggott (both subsequently CBA Presidents) and the first volume appeared in 1948. The CBA also recognised the need for adequate bibliographical backup for British archaeology, and the first volume of its regular Archaeological Bulletin, later renamed the Archaeological Bibliography, and now the online British and Irish Archaeological Bibliography first appeared in 1949.

Within five years the Council for British Archaeology had established the direction of its programme and key roles. It provides a forum and acts as a facilitator for opinion, ideas and policy development in British archaeology, connecting government, the media, and the public. It champions archaeology at all levels in education. It promotes and supports research, in the professional and voluntary sectors alike, with the essential services of its bibliographic information, digital resources, and publications. Today British archaeology is served by scores of specialist and thematic societies and groups. This busy scene did not exist in the early 1950s, when the Council set up six period-based Research Committees, spanning the whole of Britain's past from the Palaeolithic to the post-medieval period which, along with the Natural Sciences Panel (set up as early as 1945) had the remit of coordinating earlier initiatives, providing guidance where required, and establishing new projects on a national basis. In 1959 the CBA set up the first Industrial Archaeology Committee in the world. In 1965, the CBA's response to the Buchanan report Traffic in Towns introduced the concept of historic urban areas, as opposed to individual buildings or sites. Further CBA specialist Committees were established throughout the 1960s to 1980s. One of these led to the creation of the organisation which became the Chartered Institute for Archaeologists.

In 2026 the Council for British Archaeology rebranded to Archaeology UK, citing research that their name was seen by the public as a barrier to participation. Where as 'Archaeology UK' is more direct and easier to recognise, aiming to helpi more people understand how archaeology relates to the places and communities around them.

Today Archaeology UK's work is focused on three strategic areas: participation, discovery and advocacy which bring together its wide-ranging activities in education, research, publication, and information provision. They work in partnership with many other heritage and environmental bodies and with educational and research institutions across the UK.

As one of the National Amenity Societies, the council is a statutory consultee on alterations to listed buildings, and by law must be notified of any applications in England and Wales to demolish in whole or part any listed building.

== Regional groups ==
=== Council for British Archaeology East ===
The Council for British Archaeology East (or CBA East) is a regional educational charity and a part of the national Council for British Archaeology. It covers the East of England, a region with a strong local identity and distinct landscapes, and, particularly, the counties of Norfolk, Suffolk, Essex, Cambridgeshire, and Hertfordshire.

Like the national body, CBA East works to involve local people in archaeology and to encourage the appreciation and care of the historic environment for the benefit of present and future generations. The charity does this through a variety of means, including holding talks (usually monthly), guided walks, site visits, and supporting conferences. CBA East also provides a variety of grants to regional archaeological research or outreach projects.

CBA East works alongside the eleven other regional groups in England, CBA Cymru, and Archaeology Scotland.

There are four Young Archaeologists Clubs (YACs) in the East of England, in Colchester, Norwich, and Great Yarmouth, as well as in the Fenland District.

The East of England is a region with a wide variety of landscapes, including the Fens, the Broads, the Breckland, and the Gog Magog Hills, and is home to a wide range of significant archaeological sites. These include the Palaeolithic hominin footprints at Happisburgh, the Neolithic flint mines at Grime's Graves, the Must Farm Bronze Age village, and the early Mediaeval ship burials and tumuli at Sutton Hoo.

The CBA East has a number of individual members, as well as over 30 affiliated member groups, societies, museums and other organisations. These include the Caistor Roman Project, the Fenland archaeological Project, and the Suffolk Archaeological Service.

== Membership ==
Until 1993, membership of the Archaeology UK was limited to societies and organisations. Today there are over 600 institutional members, which range from village archaeological groups to museums, county societies, universities, commercial archaeological units and national bodies. Individual membership has climbed steadily since its introduction in 1993, and now exceeds 6,000. Through the eleven English Regional Groups (such as Council for British Archaeology East), CBA Wales/Cymru and the Council for Scottish Archaeology (all of which have individual membership), the CBA provides a unique forum for the British archaeological community, and the public beyond.

Members of Archaeology UK helps to ensure they have the resources to develop their work in education, conservation and providing information, and strengthen the profile of archaeology in the minds of decision-makers. Members receive:

- Six issues of Archaeology UK's flagship magazine British Archaeology
- Monthly issues of the Newsletter, with news of the latest Archaeology UK projects and initiatives
- Access to recordings of their lecture series, This is Archaeology, on-demand
- Membership of a CBA English regional group with access to local meetings, newsletters, activities and publications; or membership of national groups in Scotland or Wales for a small additional fee
- Discounts on publications and access to events

Young people up to the age of 16 can join their local Young Archaeologists' Club supported by Archaeology UK'.

== List of presidents of Archaeology UK (Council for British Archaeology) ==
- 1944: Sir Alfred Clapham
- 1944 to 1949: Sir Cyril Fox
- 1950 to 1954: Donald Harden
- 1967 to 1970: Stuart Piggott
- 1973 to 1976: Charles Thomas
- 1989 to 1992: Rosemary Cramp
- 1992 to 1995: Peter Addyman
- 2005 to 2008: Nick Merriman
- 2013 to 2021: Dan Snow
- 2021 to present: Raksha Dave

== Research priorities ==
From its earliest years, Archaeology UK has invested in research support services for the UK archaeological community through its publication programme and latterly through a range of web-based resources and services. In addition to its role in facilitating, convening and disseminating the research of others, it has maintained its own programme of research.

Archaeology UKs track record is principally in applied research to support its programmes in education, public participation and environmental protection. They have also led research in key areas such as the impact of metal detecting on archaeology, television archaeology and the media, education outside the classroom, and assessment of information and data management needs for archaeology. The Mick Aston Archaeology Fund and the Marsh Award for Community Archaeology aim to foster and celebrate voluntary research in the historic environment.

Research themes relate to Archaeology UK's central aim to increase opportunities for participation and learning through archaeology. Priority areas for research in partnership with major heritage organisations and other bodies in the sector are:

1) Archaeology in the classroom and beyond: developing local and national identities
2) Social outcomes and impacts of community archaeology and conservation projects
3) Adapting archaeology: mediating climate change histories
4) Innovation in managing digital media and serving up archaeological information to a wide audience

Archaeology UK provides research support services through their website, the TORC (Training Online Resource Centre) website, with its online guide to educational and research opportunities, and the extensive programme of publication and electronic dissemination outlined below.

== Information provision and publishing ==
Archaeology UK provides electronic access to archaeological materials, information, interpretations and discussion.

It has published almost 200 books since 1945. Today, these publications take two main forms: the Research Report series publishes monographs of research into the archaeology of Britain, largely deriving from excavation, buildings and landscape surveys. The Practical Handbooks series is methodological, and aims to present straightforward summaries of topics for those new to a particular specialism.

It also publishes British Archaeology, a bi-monthly news magazine aimed at both the general reader and the academic. Since 1997, it has published the e-journal Internet Archaeology. Since 1949, it has overseen the compilation of a comprehensive archaeological bibliography, now available free-of-charge online as the British and Irish Archaeological Bibliography. A programme of digitisation has enabled free, electronic access to much of the CBA's back catalogue of publications, including British Archaeology and many books and occasional papers.

== Events ==
The flagship Archaeology UK event each year is The Festival of Archaeology, held in July. This two-week event brings together around 500 excavation open days, guided tours, exhibitions, lectures and ancient art and craft workshopse. Over a hundred thousand people take part.

In September, the Weekend Event brings together Archaeology UK members and specialists to examine the archaeology of a particular region of the UK. The weekend also includes the annual Beatrice de Cardi lecture, in honour of the Council for British Archaeology's first permanent secretary, and the CBA AGM. Each year, Archaeology UK hosts its Winter General Meeting at the British Academy, featuring a series of lectures on a theme linking archaeology with a related discipline.

In addition, the twelve CBA English Regional Groups, CBA Wales/Cymru and Archaeology Scotland (formerly the Council for Scottish Archaeology), along with Branches of the Young Archaeologists' Club, hold over a thousand events each year throughout the UK.

== Publications ==
- British Archaeology magazine, bimonthly, access restricted to Archaeology UK members and subscribing institutions
