= Alfred Clapham =

British historian (1883 – 1950)

Sir Alfred William Clapham, CBE, FBA (1883 – 1950) was a British scholar of Romanesque architecture. He was Secretary of the Royal Commission on Historical Monuments (England) and President of the Society of Antiquaries.

== Early life ==
Alfred Clapham was born in Dalston, East London on 27 May 1883 to the Rev. James Clapham and Lucy Elizabeth Clapham 9 (née Hutchinson). He was educated at Dulwich College and then took up a position with the ecclesiastical architect James Weir. He soon transferred to the Victoria History of the Counties of England (architectural editor Sir Charles Peers).

== Career ==
In 1912 Clapham joined the Royal Commission on Historical Monuments (England) where he was successively Editor, Secretary, and Commissioner. In 1921 he published a major survey in the Antiquaries Journal on the Holy Sepulchre in Jerusalem – the result of his military service in Egypt and Palestine with the Royal Sussex Regiment during the First World War. His principal work was with the Royal Commission, being a significant contributor to the reports on Essex, Buckinghamshire, Huntingdonshire, Middlesex, London, Hertfordshire, Westmorland, and Oxford. His major achievement was a two-volume work on Romanesque Architecture in England in 1930 and 1934, and subsequently on Romanesque Architecture in Western Europe in 1936.

He was a faithful adherent of the Society of Antiquaries, being first Secretary and then its president and later the gold medallist. Although he had never been to university, in 1935 he was elected a Fellow of the British Academy.

Clapham wrote three guide books for the Ministry of Works, all of which were published posthumously. These were on the Augustinian Abbey at Thornton in Lincolnshire (1951); the Benedictine Abbey at Whitby (1952); St Augustine's Abbey at Canterbury (1955).

He was an effective chairman of the societies, being President of the Royal Archaeological Institute, Chairman of the London University Institute of Archaeology, and essentially the founder of the Council for British Archaeology. He was awarded the OBE in 1923 the CBE in 1932 and knighted in 1944.

Clapham died, on 26 October 1950, unmarried, at Clova Nursing Home in Ripon, Yorkshire.

Photographs by Sir Alfred William Clapham are held at the Conway Library in the Courtauld, London, and are being digitised.

== Selected publications ==
- Clapham, Alfred William (1936). Romanesque Architecture in Western Europe. Oxford: Clarendon Press.
