= SS Mahratta =

SS Mahratta can refer to one of three vessels:

- SS Mahratta (1865), lost in a collision in 1887
- SS Mahratta (1892), wrecked in 1909
- SS Mahratta (1917), wrecked in 1939
