= Federation of Archaeological Managers and Employers =

- Abbreviation: FAME
- Formation: 1975
- Legal status: Professional body
- Purpose: To represent the interests of archaeological business
- Region served: UK
- Chair: Timothy Malim
- Website: http://www.famearchaeology.co.uk/

The Federation of Archaeological Managers and Employers (FAME) is a professional archaeological body in the United Kingdom.

It represents around 50 archaeological businesses throughout the UK, including commercial consultancies, universities, local authorities and charitable trusts.

FAME is the distinctive voice of those archaeological businesses who provide specialist services to commercial clients and developers, and represents the interests of archaeological business to government, the public, the profession and the wider business world.

Together, its members employ around 2,000 specialist staff engaged in the recording, analysis, research and publication of archaeological evidence in England, Scotland and Wales.

== History ==
Originally formed in 1975 as the Standing Conference of Unit Managers (SCUM), it later became the Standing Conference of Archaeological Unit Managers (SCAUM), and changed its name to FAME in 2008.

It is governed by a Chair and a Committee elected annually from its member organisations, with a Chief Executive responsible for day-to-day business.

== Services ==
Its services include

• Voicing issues of concern to its members

• Providing advice, support and information

• Contributing to national forums, committees and alliances

• Responding to national policy consultations

• Liaising regularly with key partners such as ALGAO, CBA and the Chartered Institute for Archaeologists (CIfA)

• Collating market data in partnership with the Chartered Institute for Archaeologists

• Contributing to the Chartered Institute for Archaeologists Standards and Guidance

• Promoting training and professional development

• Publishing a Health and Safety Manual and safety updates

• Collating national health and safety data

• Hosting annual networking events

• Publishing regular newsletters and employment updates

== Issues ==
FAME expresses its views on national and local issues directly affecting its members. Recent examples have included the publication of government guidance on planning and archaeology, job losses in archaeology, the Fenland debate, the findings of the Southport Group, and the growing crisis of undeposited archaeological archives held by member organisations.
