= Chartered Institute for Archaeologists =

Professional organisation

- Abbreviation: CIfA
- Formation: 1982; 44 years ago
- Legal status: Professional organisation
- Purpose: To advance the practice of archaeology and allied disciplines
- Headquarters: Power Steele Building, Wessex Hall, University of Reading
- Members: 3,900
- Chief Executive: Nathan Baker
- Former Chief Executive: Peter Hinton
- Staff: 14
- Website: www.archaeologists.net

The Chartered Institute for Archaeologists (CIfA) is a professional organisation for archaeologists working in the United Kingdom and overseas. It was founded in 1982, and at 21 July 2020 had 3,931 members overall, of whom 3,033 were accredited professionals; it also has 80 accredited organisations.

CIfA members are drawn from across the archaeological community, and from around the world - in 2018 the membership included archaeologists from 40 countries.

Accredited membership is by election following a satisfactory demonstration of archaeological experience and competence and an undertaking to abide by the institute's code of conduct. CIfA's aims are to advance the practice of archaeology and allied disciplines by promoting professional standards and ethics for conserving, managing, understanding and promoting enjoyment of the heritage.

CIfA is currently based at the University of Reading.

== History ==
The idea of establishing an institute for archaeologists came about in 1973 when the Council for British Archaeology set up a working party on Professionalism in Archaeology. This was due to a rapid increase in the number of employed archaeologists and the need for a body to be responsible for the establishment and maintenance of professional standards in archaeology.

In 1979 an Association for the Promotion of the Institute of Field Archaeologists (APIFA) was established. This group determined that the objectives of the proposed Institute of Field Archaeologists (IFA) should include 'the definition and maintenance of appropriate standards of

- Training and education in field archaeology
- Responsible and ethical conduct in the execution and supervision of work
- Conservation of the archaeological heritage'

In May 1980 APIFA published a draft Code of conduct; the election of the institute's founding council was held on 21 December 1982. The first chair and Member No 1 was Peter Addyman and other notable early members were Mick Aston (21), Philip A. Barker and Francis Pryor (15).

Recognising that archaeologists work in all aspects of the historic environment, in 2008 members voted in favour of adopting a trading name of the Institute for Archaeologists along with a rebrand to reflect this. At the 2013 AGM, members agreed that a formal petition for royal charter should be made to the Privy Council and on 9 December 2014 the Chartered Institute for Archaeologists was established.

== Services ==
CIfA is responsible for the production and maintenance of a Code of conduct along with a variety of Standards and Guidance documents and policy statements and practice guides . It promotes the value of professional ethics and provides a number of online resources

As well as lobbying and making representations to national and local government and other agencies on behalf of its members, it champions professionalism in archaeology. CIfA's overall goal is for clients to engage only accredited professionals with the necessary skills to carry out archaeological services and to support this is organises conferences and training initiatives, accredits courses, provides online Continuing Professional Development facilities, and has a wide range of specialist and area networks.

Its publications include a regular magazine The Archaeologist, and a Yearbook and Directory. Members also receive a reduction on The Historic Environment: Policy and Practice, a journal published by Taylor & Francis. CIfA also holds an annual conference in spring, and its Annual General Meeting (AGM) - which usually also incorporates a training event - in the autumn.

== Membership ==
=== Individual ===
CIfA offers three professionally accredited grades: Practitioner (PCIfA) accreditation is open to those who have undertaken skilled tasks within the historic environment sector under the guidance of others; Associate (ACIfA) accreditation is open to those who have carried out, delegated or brought to conclusion pieces of work within the historic environment sector, with some autonomy but without holding ultimate responsibility, and Members (MCIfAs) accreditation is open to those with the highest level of responsibility within the historic environment sector with sole responsibility to initiate, negotiate, carry out and/or delegate, and bring to conclusion pieces of work. Accredited members may be professional or amateur archaeologists and are permitted to use the relevant post nominal abbreviation after their names. All accredited members have full voting rights within the institute. CIfA accreditation is recognised by the Construction Skills Certification Scheme to qualify for a CSCS card.

Affiliate and student memberships are also available. Student membership is open to students in full or part-time at under- or post-graduate level, where archaeology is studied in equal or greater weight to another subject. Student membership is retained for up to 12 months after graduation after which it is automatically transferred to Affiliate membership. Affiliate membership is open to those who have an active interest in archaeology but do not yet qualify for a accreditation.

=== Organisation ===
In 1996 CIfA launched a Register of Archaeological Organisations which provides a quality assurance scheme for archaeological organisations. Like with individual accreditation, in return for registration, the scheme requires organisations to comply with the Code of conduct and to work in accordance with defined policies and procedures, and current best practice.

=== International ===
CIfA regards itself as a UK-based organisation that operates internationally, and individual membership is open to archaeologists from any part of the world. In 2017-18 the German archaeological association DGUF worked with CIfA to set up CIfA Deutschland; the group was formally established in 2019. A CIfA Australia group was set up in the following year.

CIfA has also entered into memoranda of understanding with other archaeological associations with similar objectives. These include the European Association of Archaeologists (EAA), the Register of Professional Archaeologists (RPA) in the United States of America, DGUF in Germany, and the Institute of Archaeologists of Ireland (IAI).

== Issues ==
Low pay and poor job security in archaeology have been a major problem throughout the institute's history and there is often a misunderstanding about CIfAs role, as a professional association in addressing this as opposed to a trade union or trade association. The institute has a vital role to play in improving and maintaining standards of archaeological work, and in enhancing the status of archaeologists. It believes that inadequate pay and conditions undermines the work it does in these areas and is keen to ensure that the issue of pay is proactively addressed by the whole sector. As a result CIfA has a published policy statement on pay and pushed to establish an Industry Group to discuss relevant issues within the sector with Prospect and Federation of Archaeological Managers and Employers.

== Bibliography ==
- Addyman, P. (2003). 'Memories Peter Addyman Chair 1982-1985' in The Archaeologist No. 50 Autumn 2003
- Darvill, T (ed.) (2003). Oxford Concise Dictionary of Archaeology, Oxford: Oxford University Press. ISBN 0-19-280005-1.
- Hinton, P. (2011). 'What the Dickens happened to the IFA?' In Schofield, J., ed. Great Excavations Shaping the Archaeological Profession, pp.289-299. Oxford: Oxbow Books.
- IFA (2007). Institute of Field Archaeologists Yearbook and Directory 2007 ISBN 978-1-900915-40-3
- Schauer, M. and Hinton, P. (2019). 'Professional associations and international cooperation:the birth of CIfA Deutschland' in Archäologische Informationen, 42. doi:10.11588/ai.2019.0.69354
