= All Saints' Church, Brixworth =

Church in Northamptonshire, England

Coordinates: 52°20′02″N 0°54′17″W

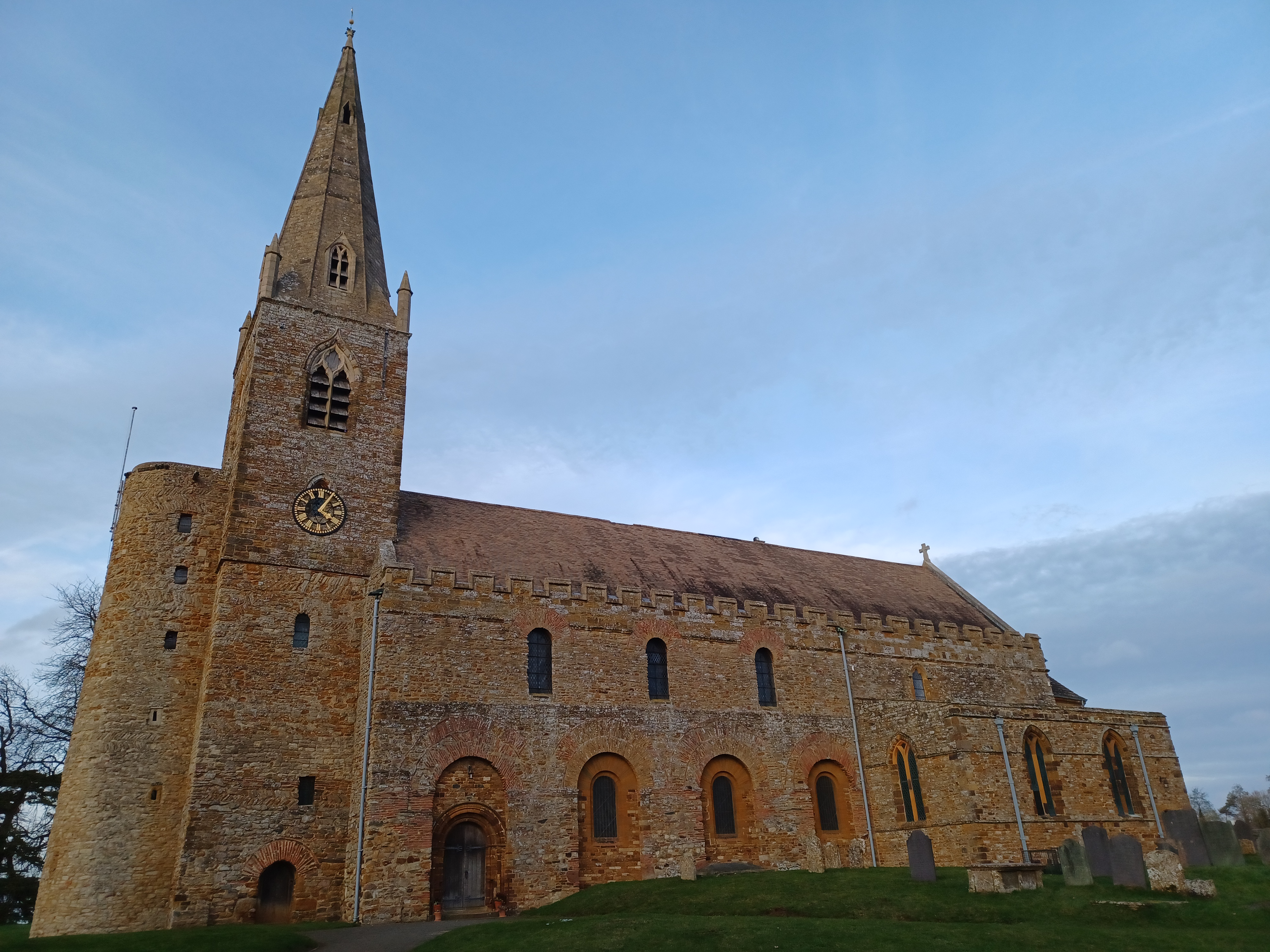
- All Saints' Church, Brixworth

- Location within Northamptonshire
- OS grid reference: SP 74750 71217
- Country: England
- Denomination: Church of England

History
- Dedication: All Saints

Architecture
- Heritage designation: Grade I listed
- Designated: 2 November 1954
- Architectural type: basilica
- Style: Anglo-Saxon Romanesque

Specifications
- Materials: stone

Administration
- Province: Canterbury
- Diocese: Peterborough
- Archdeaconry: Northampton
- Deanery: Brixworth
- Parish: Brixworth

Clergy
- Bishop: John Holbrook
- Rector: David Reith

All Saints' Church, Brixworth, now the parish church of Brixworth, Northamptonshire, England, is a leading example of early Anglo-Saxon architecture. It is the largest English church that remains substantially as it was in the Anglo-Saxon era. It was designated as a Grade I listed building in 1954.

== Building ==
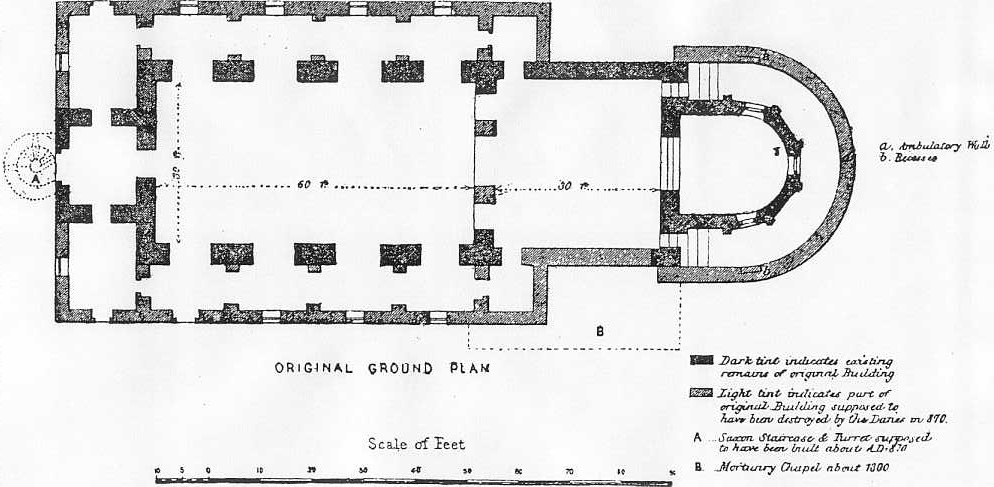
Reconstructed plan of Brixworth church in the Anglo-Saxon era

The Peterborough Chronicle records Brixworth as having a monastery, Brixworth Abbey, founded when Seaxwulf became bishop of Mercia, before the death of King Wulfhere of Mercia in AD 675. The present church was begun in the late eighth or early ninth century, either by King Offa of Mercia or his successor, Coenwulf. Many elements from this building remain visible, along with later additions from further phases of building in the 10th, 14th and 19th centuries. The older building contains features typically found in architecture of a later period, including an ambulatory. Now it is a parish church and a Grade I listed building.

Roman architecture can be considered the precedent for early Christian church building; hence the term 'Romanesque'. The church was built in the form of an Early Christian basilica, but with piers instead of columns.

What remains of the original building is a clerestoried nave, north and south arcades blocked and infilled with windows, a presbytery separated from the nave by a great arch, and the foundations of a semicircular apse. The west tower was begun as a two-storey porch, heightened in the 10th century to form a tower.

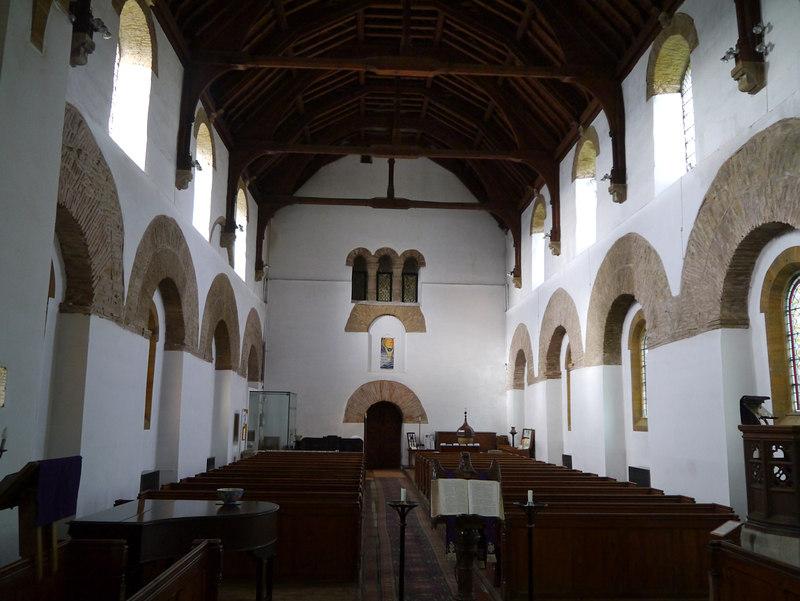
Nave looking west

In the 13th century a south aisle was added to the nave, a south chapel was added beside the presbytery and the apsidal chancel was replaced with a rectangular one. In the 14th century the west tower was heightened again and the present broach spire was added. Archaeological excavations have shown that the original church had side chambers, called porticus, that would have extended either side of the present nave. At the position of the present tower was a narthex (vestibule), and original pillars now covered by flooring show that there was a three-arched opening between the nave and the presbytery. The original entrance was at the west end. In the Norman era the present south door was inserted in the westernmost arch of the south arcade.

Reclaimed Roman stone and brick tiles were used in the construction of the building. Petrological analysis suggests the sources were the Roman towns of Lactodurum (Towcester) and Ratae Corieltauvorum (Leicester). Roman-sized brick tiles are used in the arcading and other arches.

An ambulatory ran around the outside of the original apse below ground level. Originally steps led down to the ambulatory, which was covered by a barrel vault. The purpose of this ambulatory was probably to house or provide access to preserved relics.

It has been suggested that Brixworth may have been the site of synods that took place at Clofesho in the 8th and 9th centuries. This might account for the unusually large size of the building by the standards of the time. However, there are other possible candidates for their location and Clofesho's true identity has not been proved.

In the 10th century the tower and stair turret replaced the narthex. This is one of four remaining Anglo-Saxon stair turrets in England, and is similar to the one at St Andrew's parish church, Brigstock, about 20 miles (32 km) northeast of Brixworth. The other two are at Broughton, Lincolnshire and Hough-on-the-Hill. At Brixworth, a triple arch was inserted into the existing masonry of the west nave wall at high level, replacing an existing arch. The arches are supported by baluster shafts, which are typical of Anglo-Saxon architecture, and can also be seen at the tower of All Saints' Church, Earls Barton, about 8 miles (13 km) southeast of Brixworth. In the 14th century the upper stages of the tower and the spire were added.

The churchyard contains the war graves of three British Army soldiers of World War I and a Royal Pioneer Corps officer of World War II.

== Victorian restoration ==
In 1865–66 major works were carried out to the church to the requirements of Charles Frederic Watkins, who was vicar at that time. These involved the removal of a large part of the medieval chancel and exposure of the ambulatory below ground level that surrounded the apse at the east end of the building. The south-east chapel was shortened by one bay and the south porch demolished, in each case to expose earlier stonework. The work included the provision of 247 additional free seats.

== Bells ==
The west tower has a ring of six bells. Hugh Watts of Leicester cast the second, third, fourth and fifth bells in 1622. Henry Bagley of Chacombe cast the tenor bell in 1683. The Whitechapel Bell Foundry cast the treble bell in 1993.

== Registers ==
The parish registers start in 1546 and, apart from those currently in use, are kept at Northamptonshire Record Office (NRO). Details of its location and opening times can be found on NRO's website. Rev James Jackson, who was vicar of Brixworth from 1735 to 1770, compiled an analytical index to Brixworth families since the 16th century which incorporated information from his personal knowledge as well as entries from the parish register. It therefore includes considerable information about the origins and destinations of people who arrived in or migrated from the village during the 18th century. This manuscript is also kept at NRO, where its reference is "ML 380".

== Benefice ==
Brixworth is part of a united Benefice along with Holcot. Each parish retains its own church building.

== Gallery ==
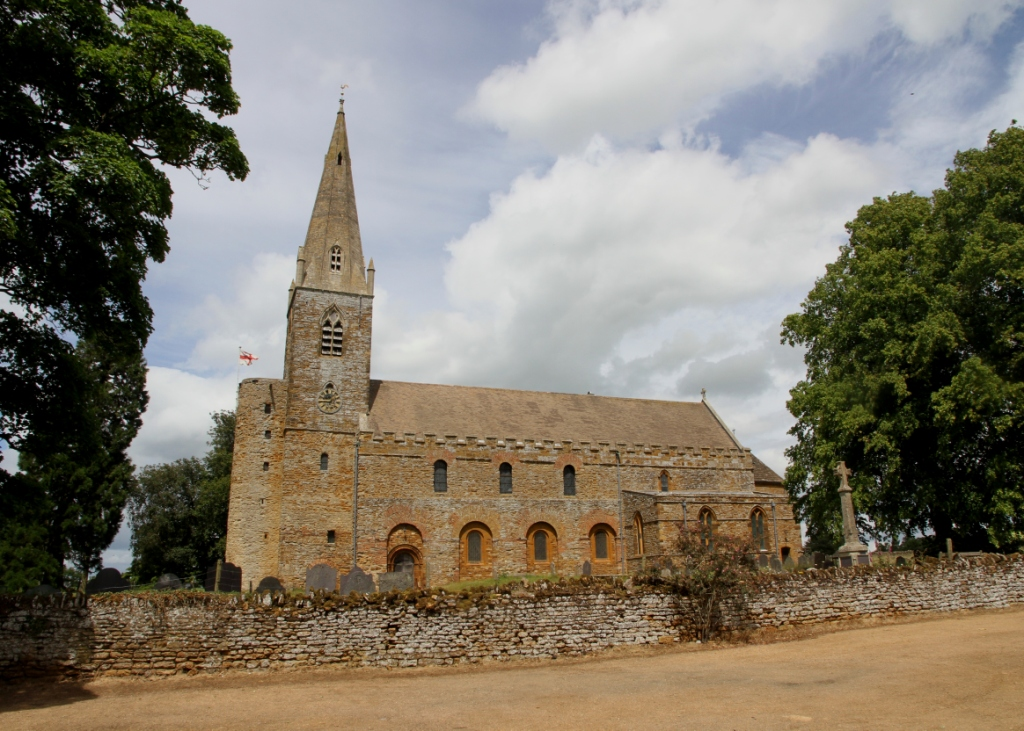
All Saints' parish church seen from the south

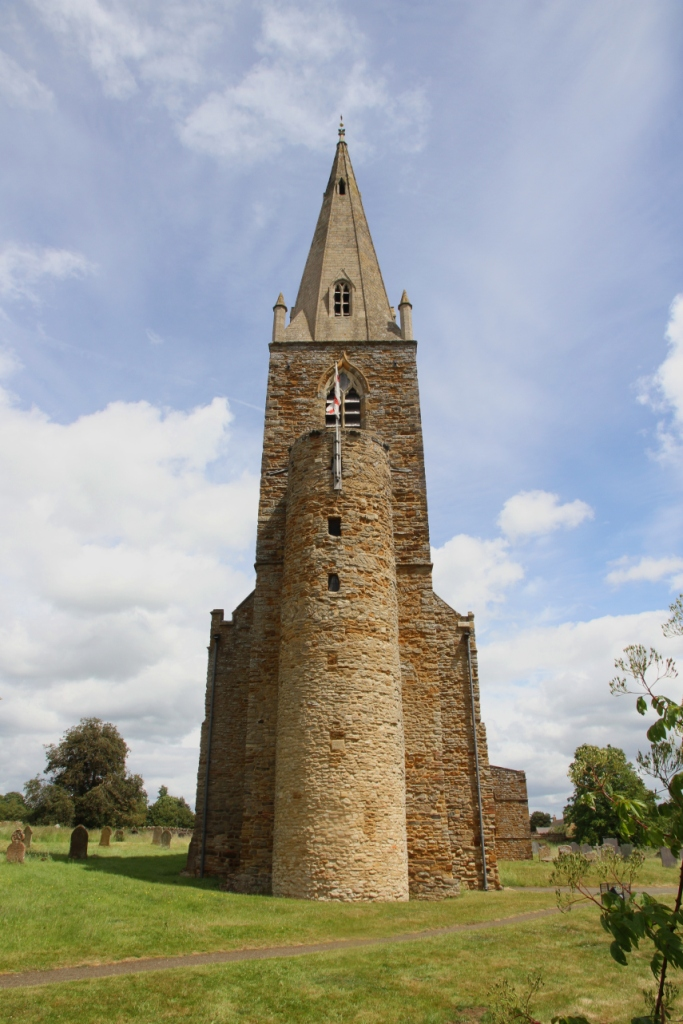
All Saints' Church seen from the west. The stair turret is 10th-century; the spire and upper stages of the tower are 14th-century.

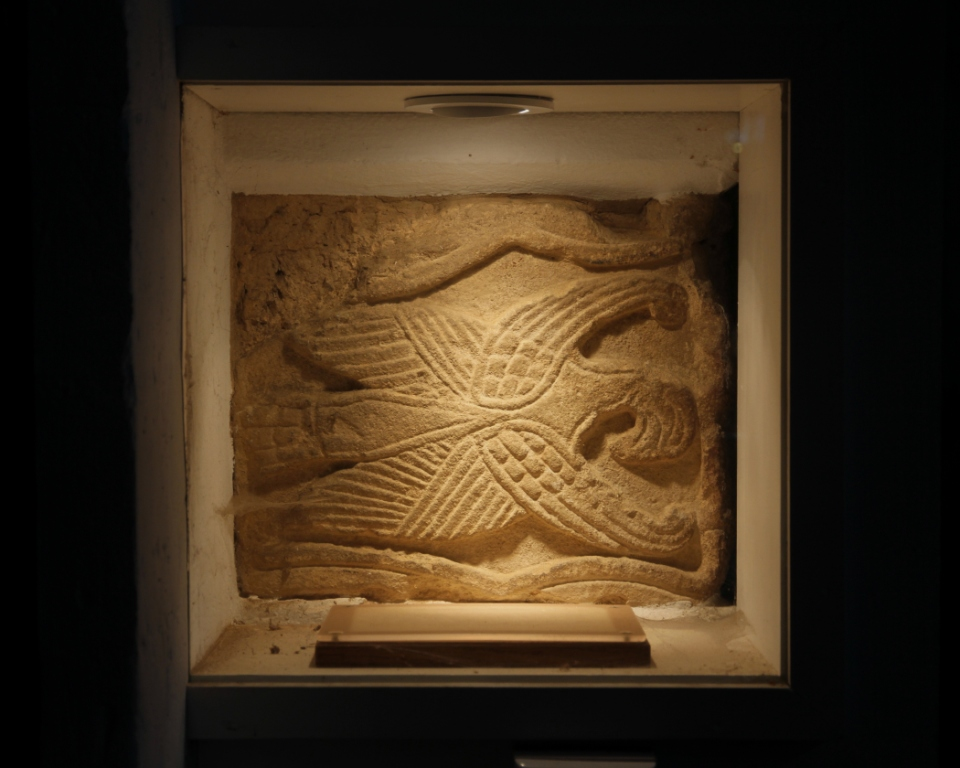
Anglo-Saxon relief just inside the Norman south door, representing the eagle of St John the Evangelist. It was an arm of a cross and may be 9th-century.

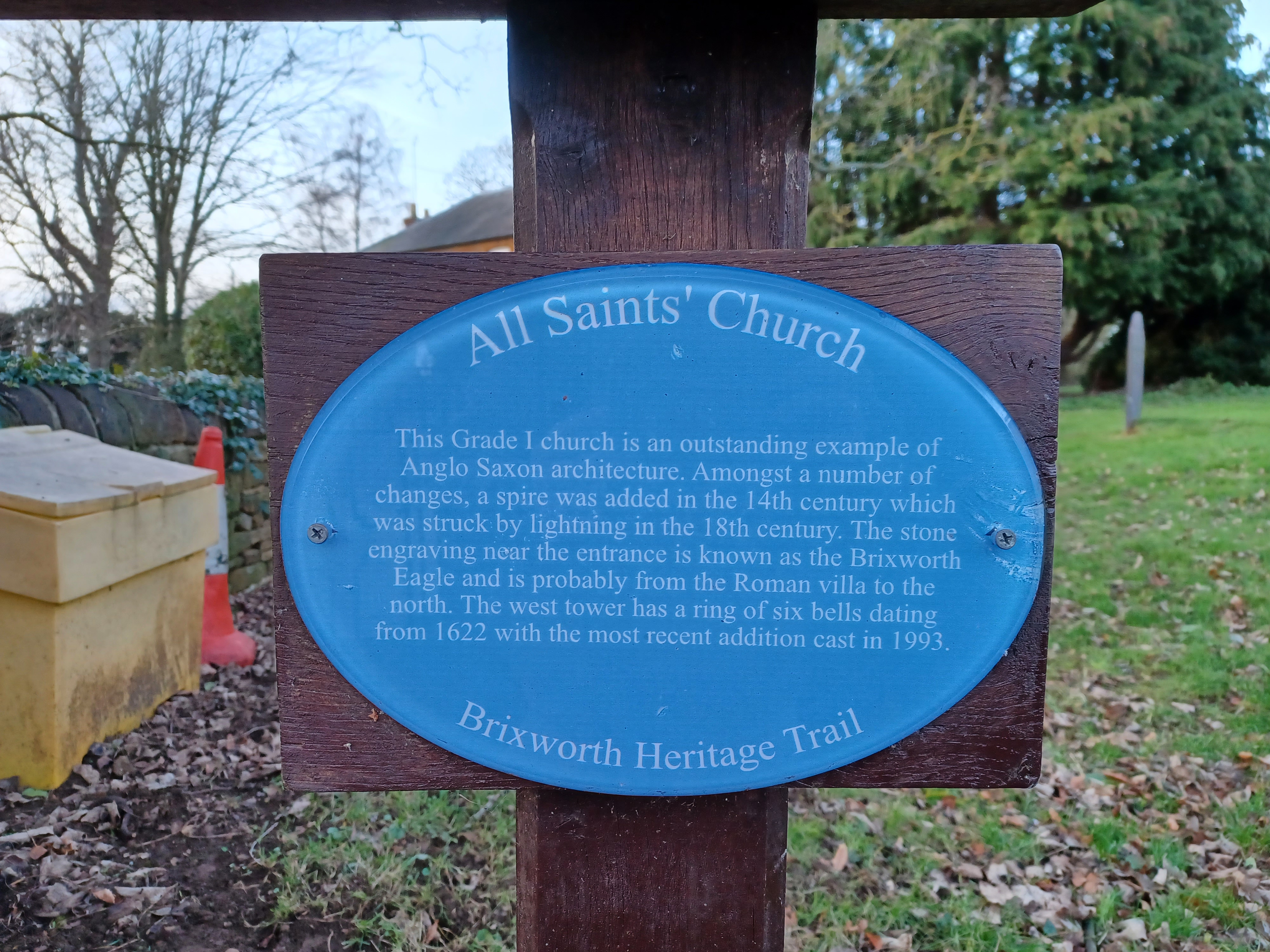
All Saints' Church — 7th-century origin; modified in the 10th, 13th, and 19th centuries; Grade I listed.

== See also ==
- Grade I listed buildings in Northamptonshire
- All Saints' Church, Earls Barton
- St Peter's Church, Northampton
- The Slapton Wall Paintings

== Sources and further reading ==
- Parsons, David; Sutherland, D (2013). The Anglo-Saxon Church of All Saints, Brixworth; Northamptonshire: Survey, excavation and analysis,1972-2010. Oxford: Oxbow Books.
- Clapham, Alfred (1930). English Romanesque Architecture. Vol. 1, Before the Conquest. Oxford: Clarendon Press.
- Keynes, Simon (1994). The Councils of Clofesho. Leicester: Leicester University Press. ISBN 978-0-901507-56-3.
- North, Thomas (1878). The Church Bells of Northamptonshire: Their Inscriptions, Traditions, and Peculiar Uses, With Chapters on Bells and the Northants Bell Founders. Leicester: Samuel Clarke. OCLC 8392172.
- Norwich, John Julius (1985). The Architecture of Southern England. London: Macmillan. ISBN 0-333-22037-4.
- Pevsner, Nikolaus; Cherry, Bridget (revision) (1973) [1961]. Northamptonshire. The Buildings of England (2nd ed.). Harmondsworth: Penguin Books. ISBN 0-14-071022-1.
- RCHME, ed. (1981). An Inventory of the Historical Monuments in the County of Northamptonshire. Vol. 3, Archaeological Sites in North-West Northamptonshire. London: Her Majesty's Stationery Office. pp. 26–31.
- Watkins, CF (1867). The Basilica, Or, Palatial Hall of Justice and Sacred Temple: Its Nature, Origin, and a Description and History of the Basilican Church of Brixworth. London: Rivington.
