= St Mary and St Peter's Church, Harlaxton =

Church in Lincolnshire, England

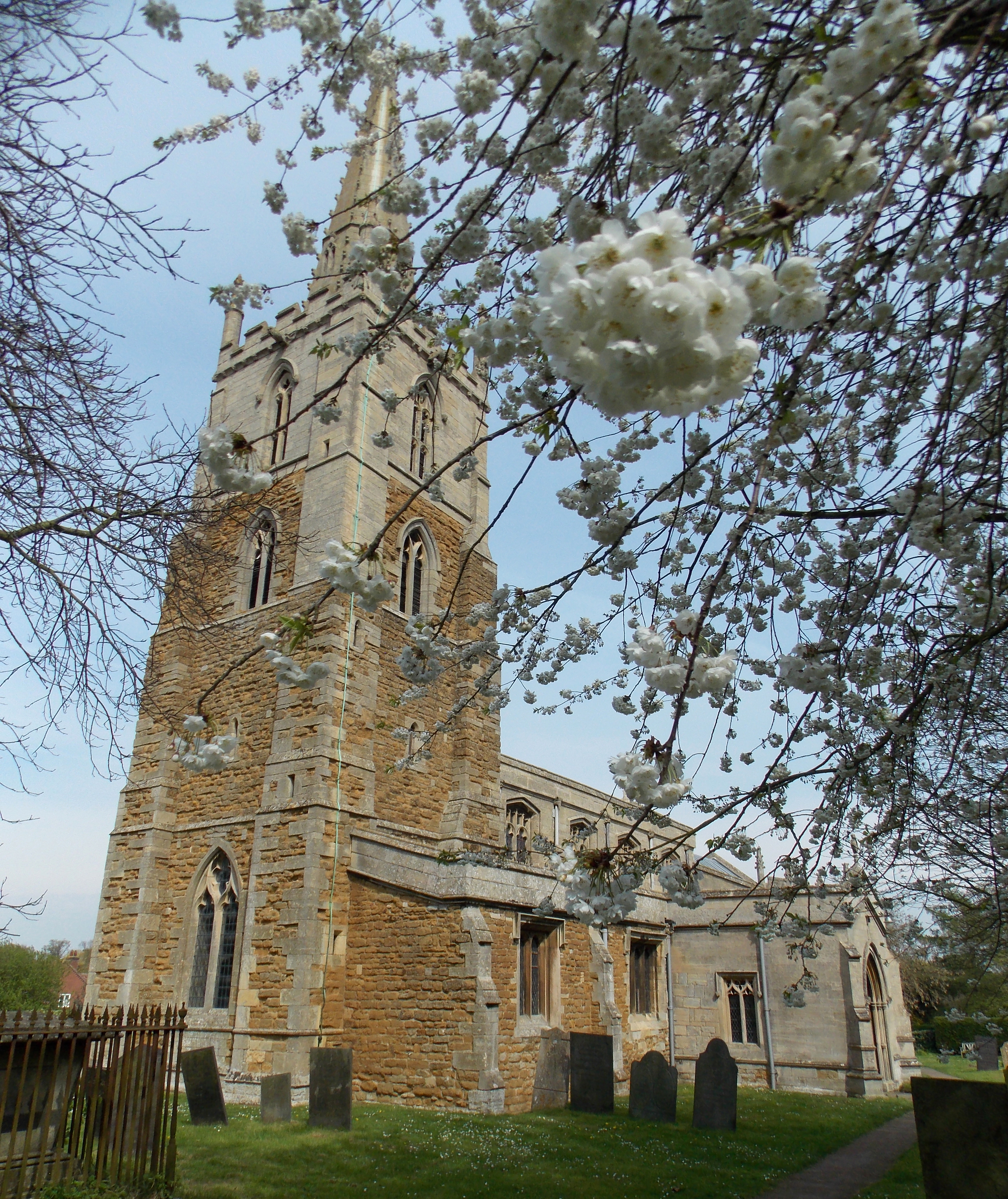
- Church of St Mary and St Peter, Harlaxton
- St Mary and St Peter's Church, Harlaxton
- 52°53′03″N 0°41′23″W
- OS grid reference: SK 88268 32644
- Country: England
- Denomination: Church of England

History
- Founded: 12th century
- Dedication: Saint Mary; Saint Peter

Architecture
- Heritage designation: Grade I
- Designated: 20 September 1966
- Architectural type: Early English; Perpendicular; Tudor

Specifications
- Materials: ironstone and limestone-ashlar

Administration
- Province: Canterbury
- Diocese: Diocese of Lincoln
- Deanery: Deanery of Grantham
- Parish: Harlaxton

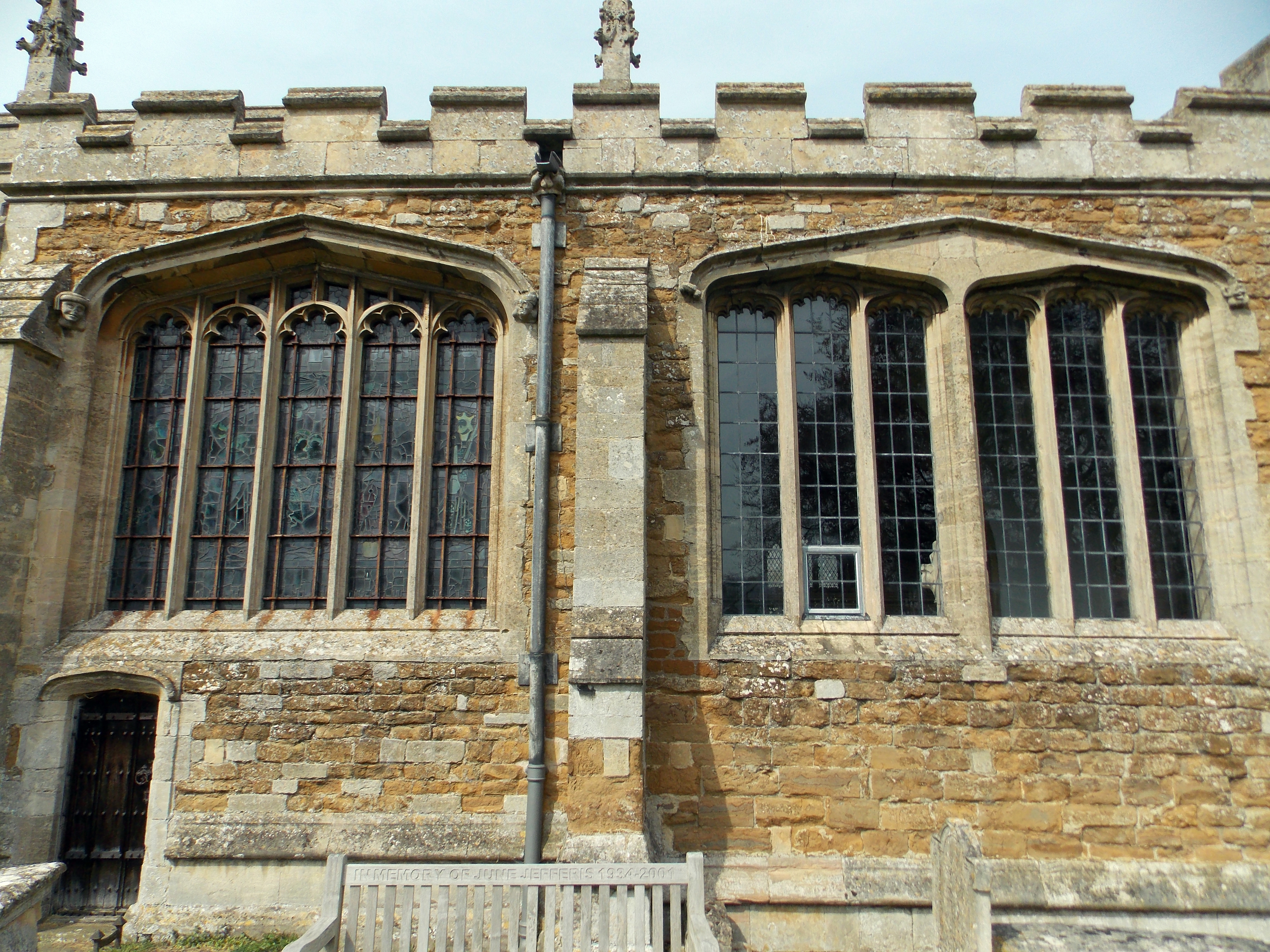
South chapel Tudor windows and Tudor doorway

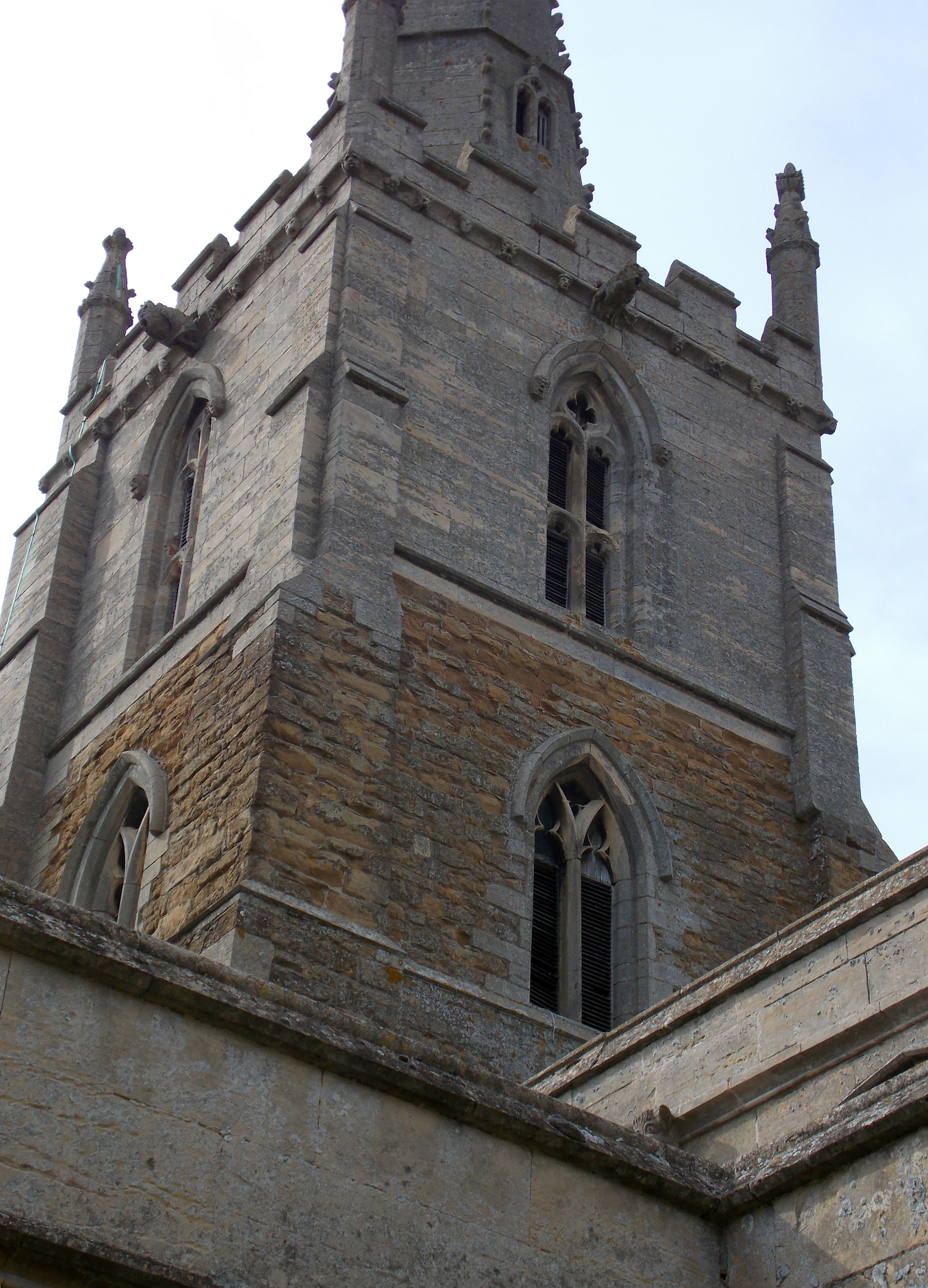
Tower third and fourth stages and embattled parapet

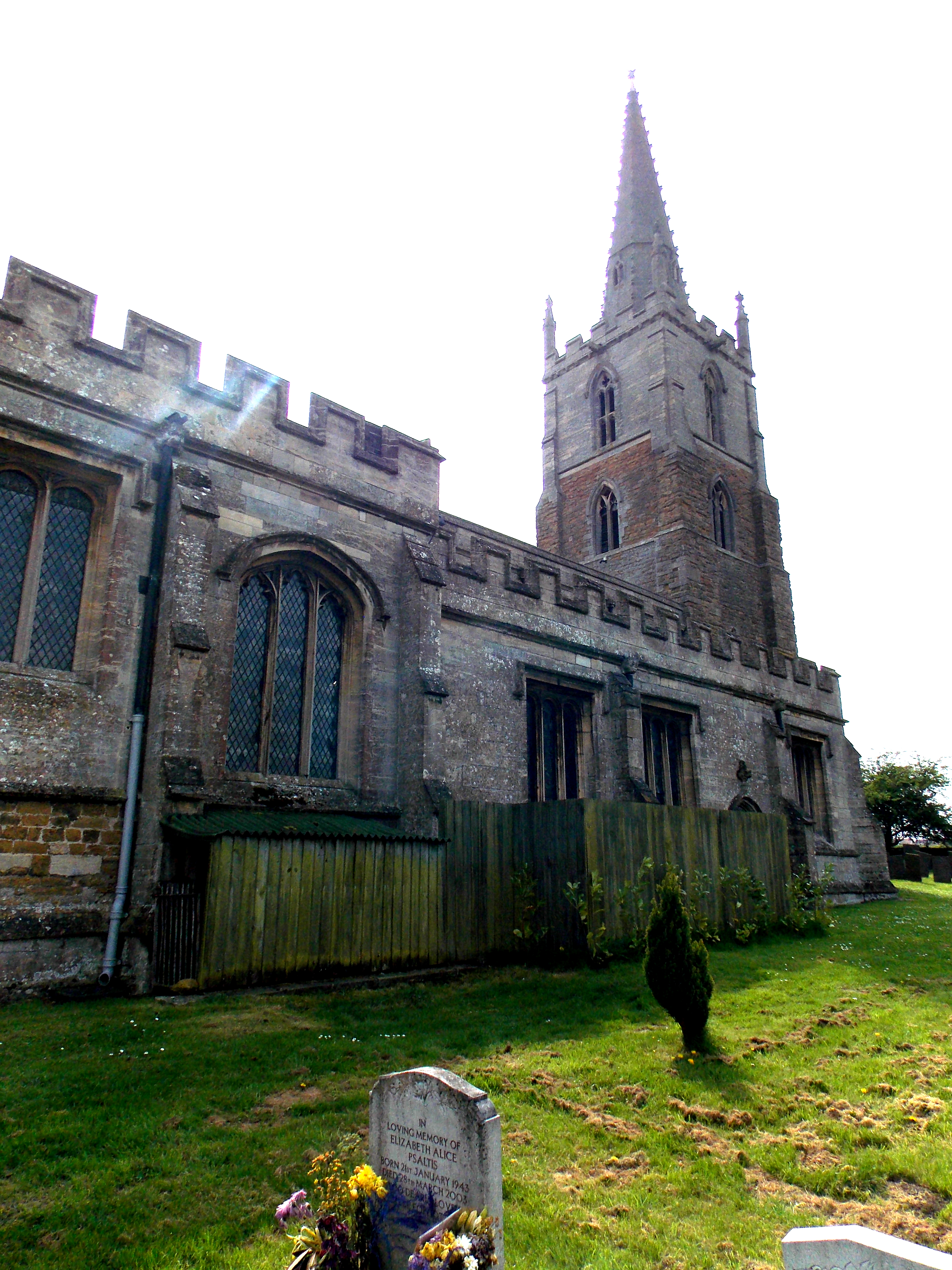
North chapel and north aisle

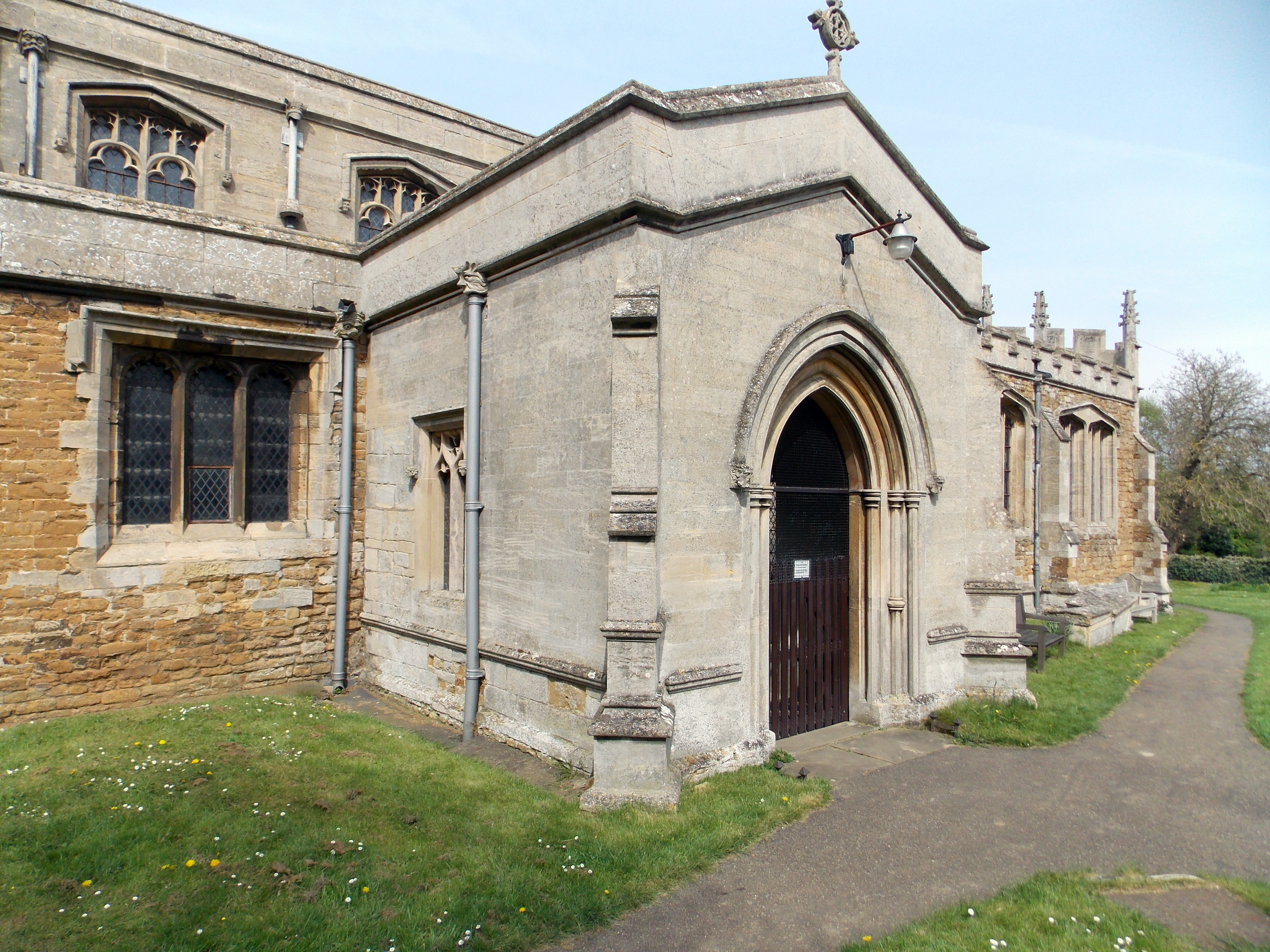
South porch, rebuilt in 1856-58

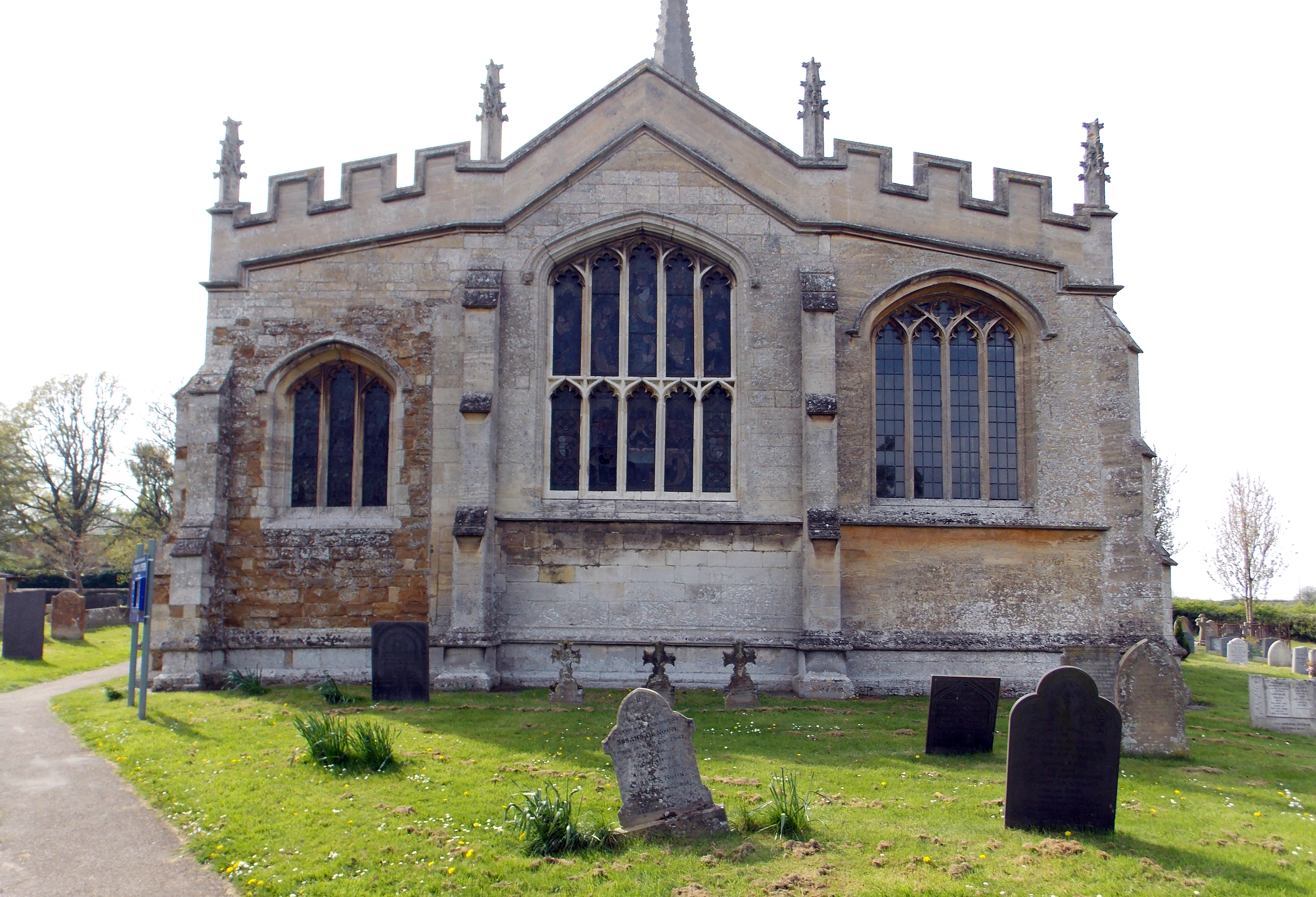
East of the church with chancel and side chapel windows

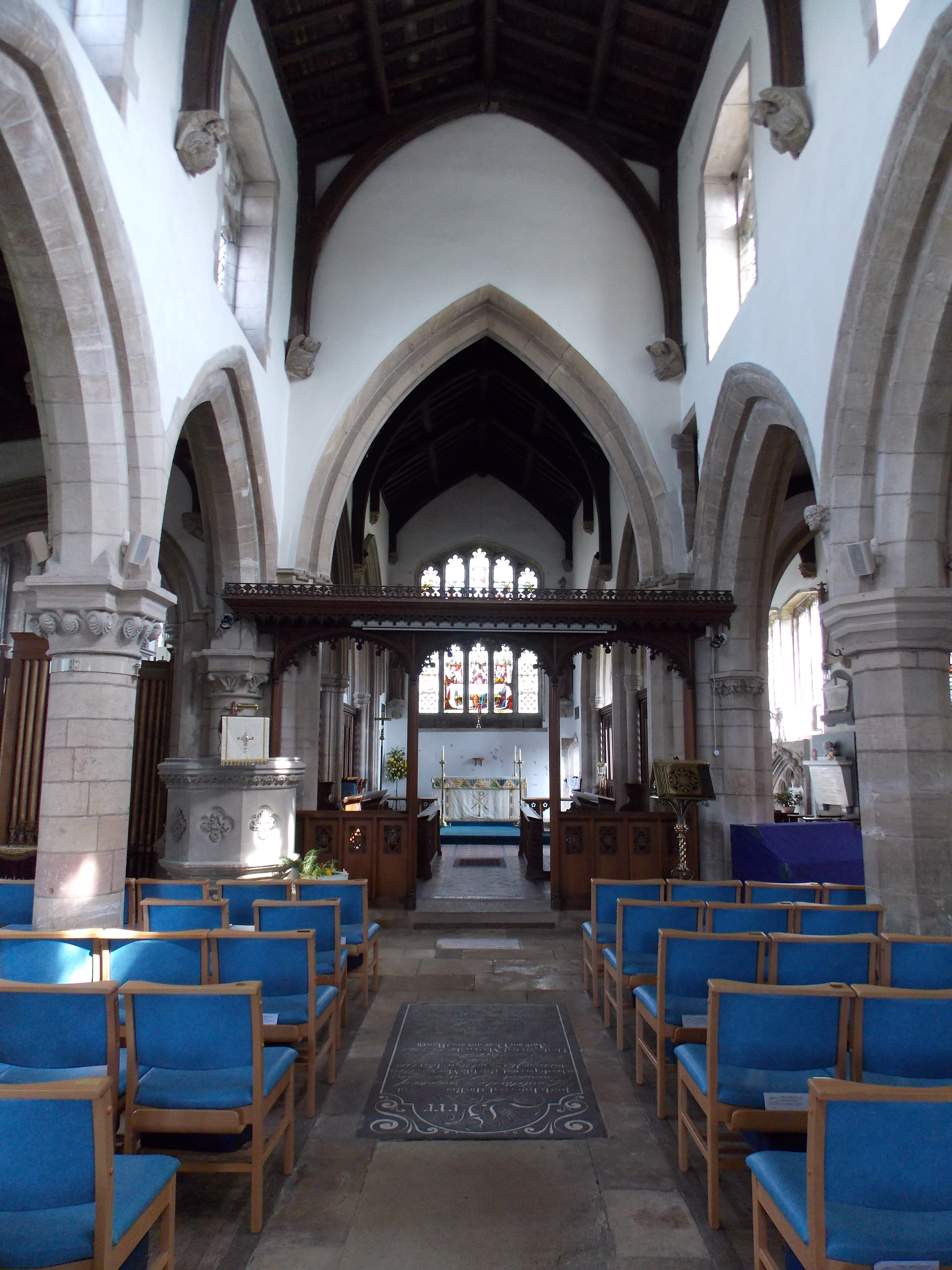
Nave with rood screen and chancel beyond

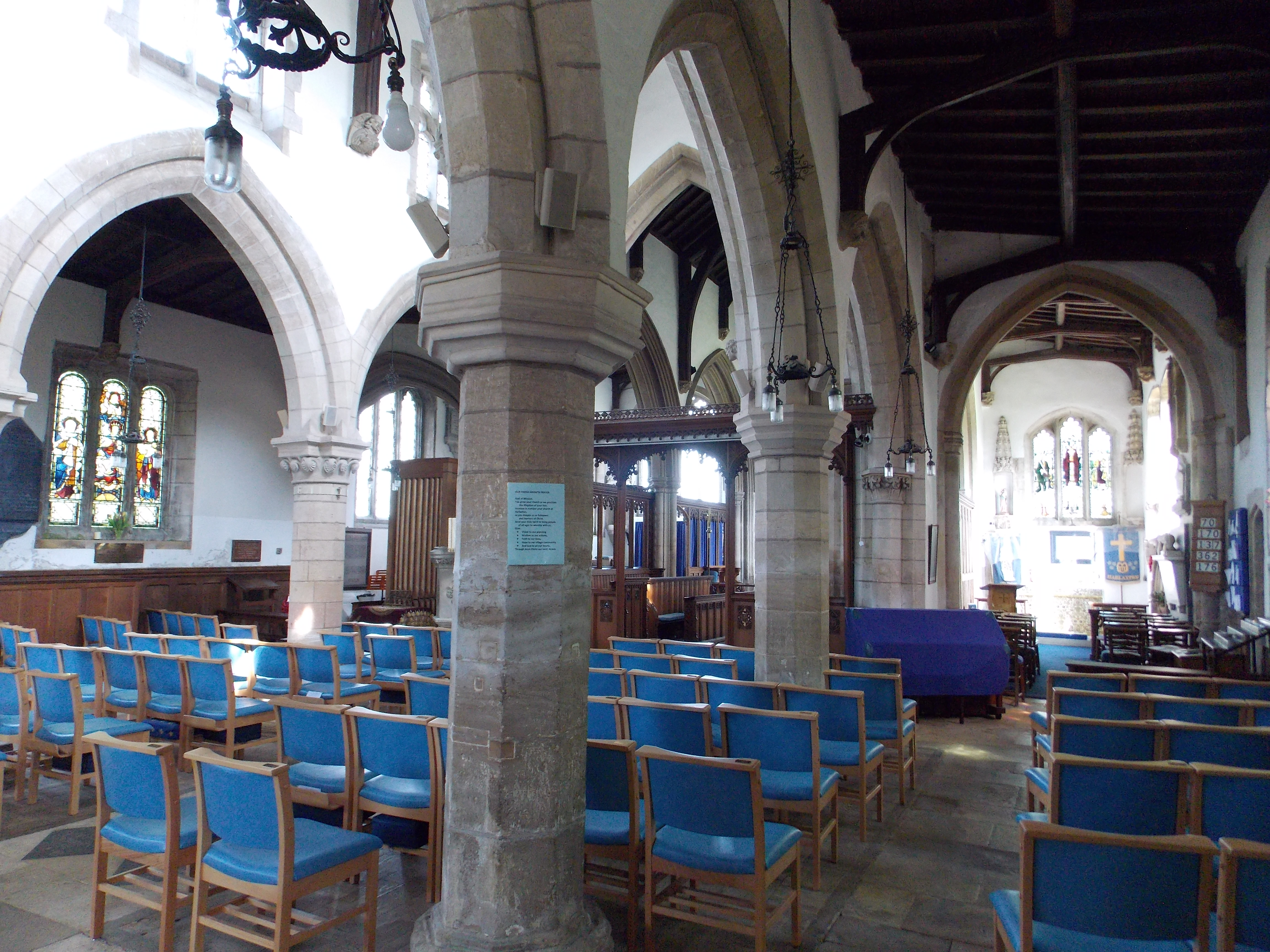
From the south aisle looking along to the south chapel and across the nave to the north aisle

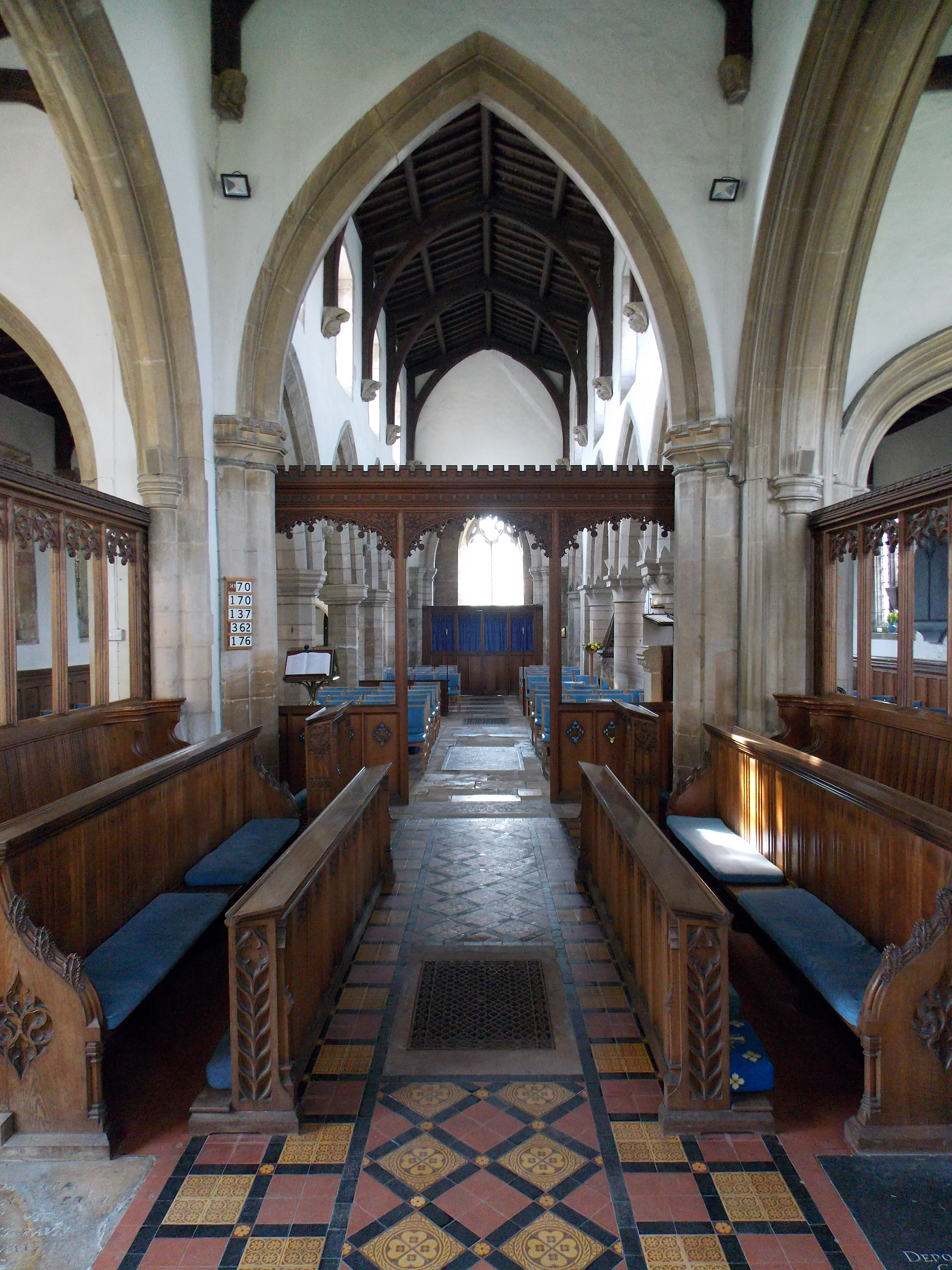
Chancel with choir stalls, looking through the rood screen to the nave and tower beyond

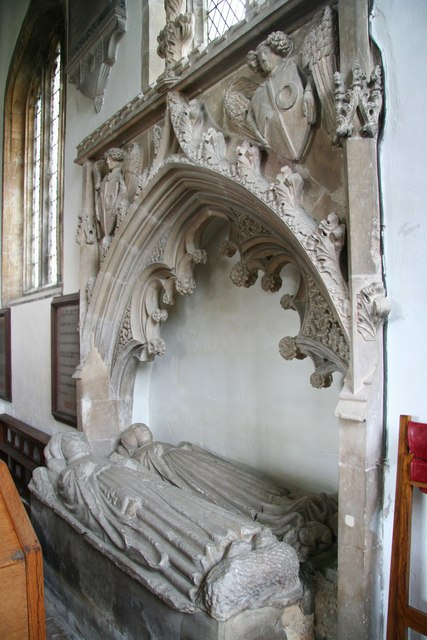
Tomb of Sir Richard Rickhill and his wife, Elizabeth, with canopy above

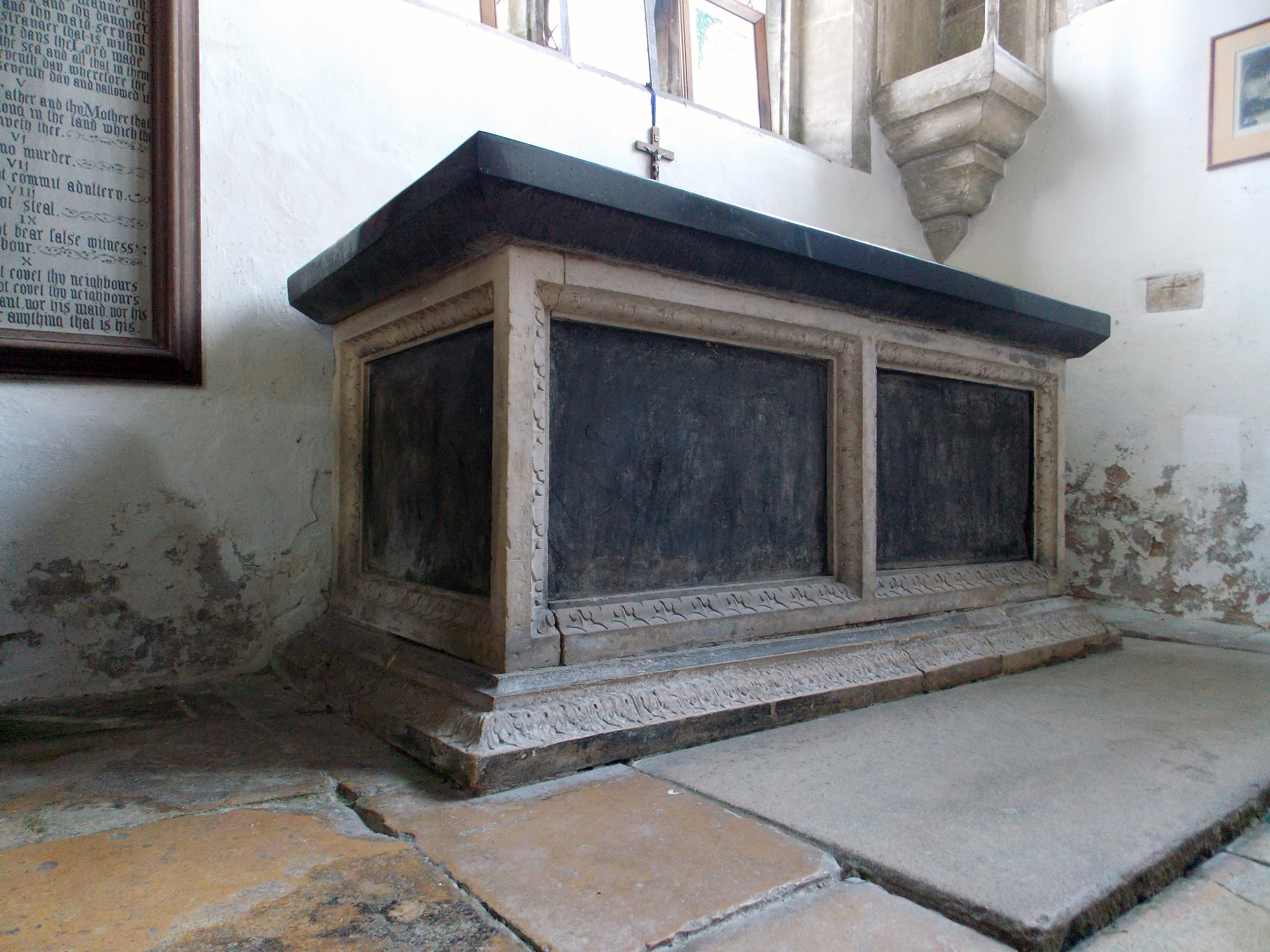
Tomb of Daniel De Ligne and his wife, Elizabeth

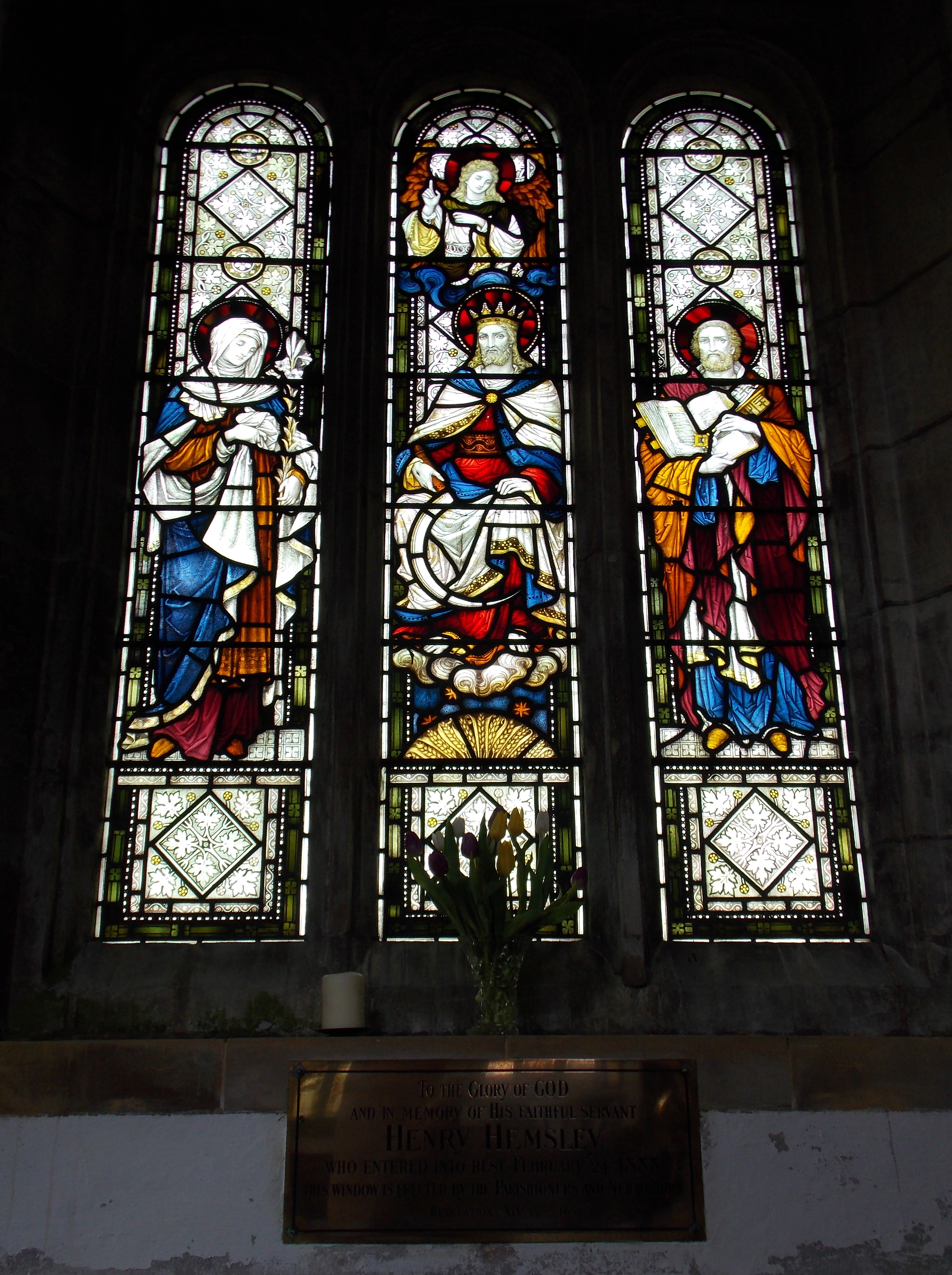
North aisle stained glass window

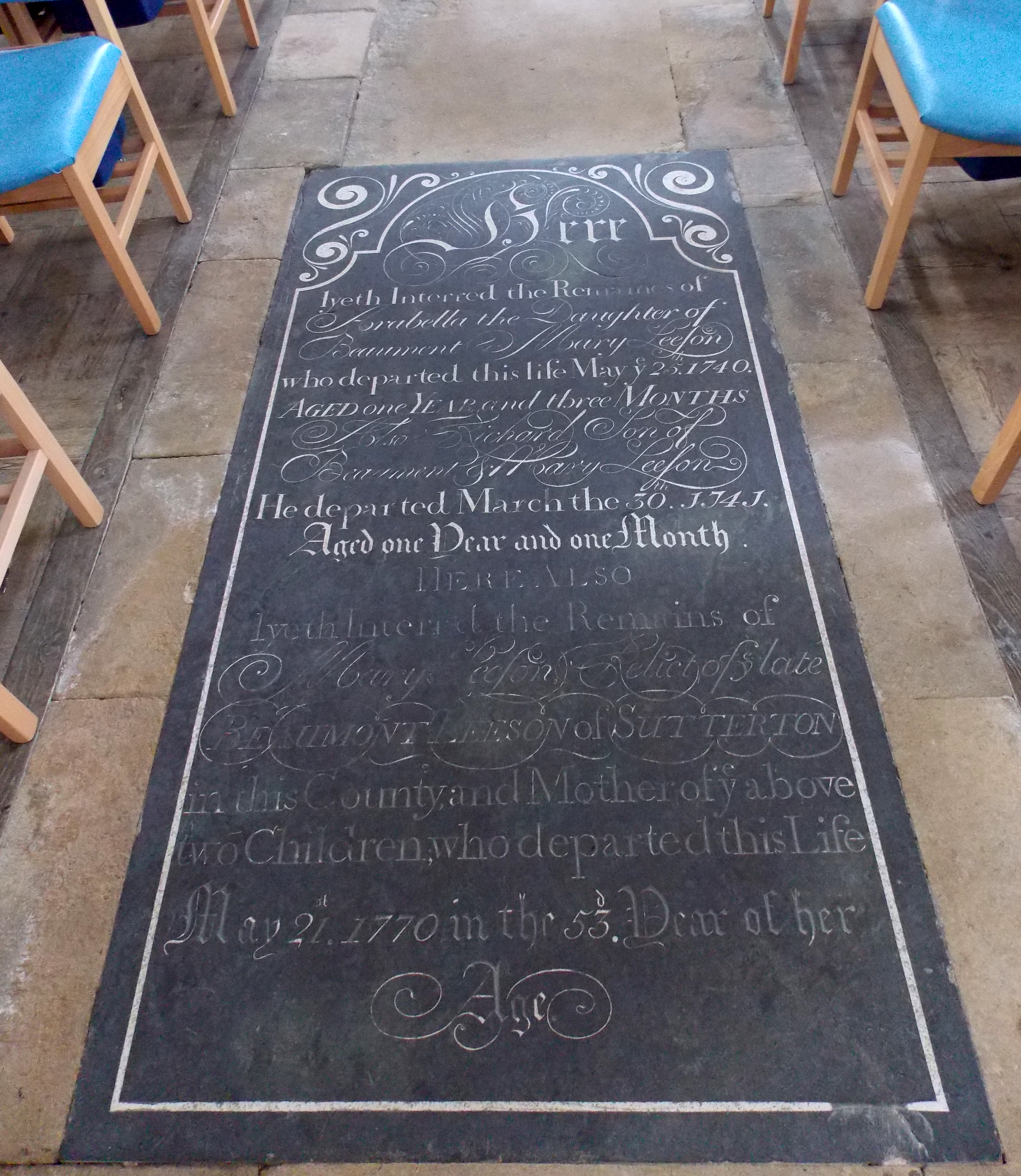
Nave slate slab to the Leeson family

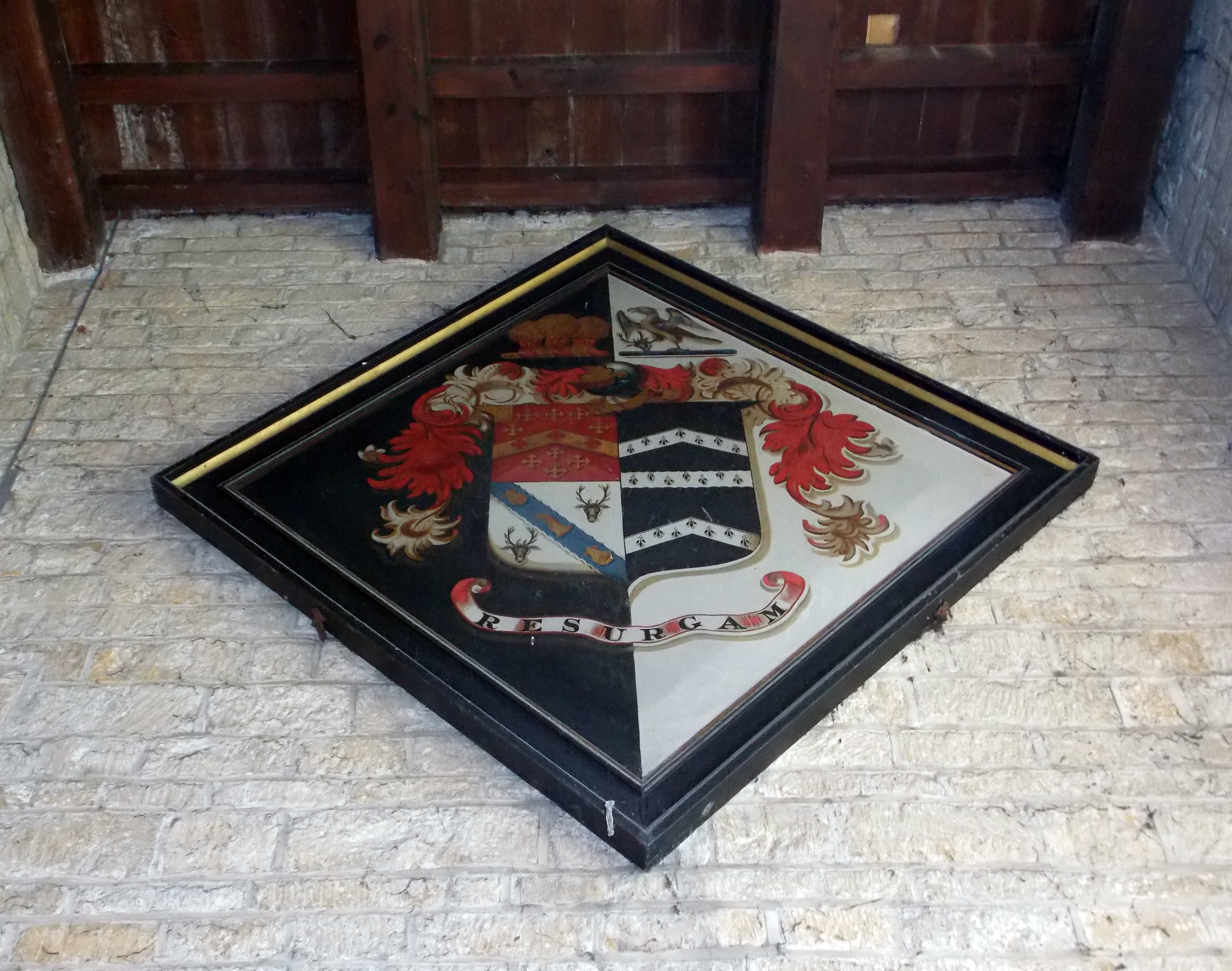
Funerary hatchment in the tower

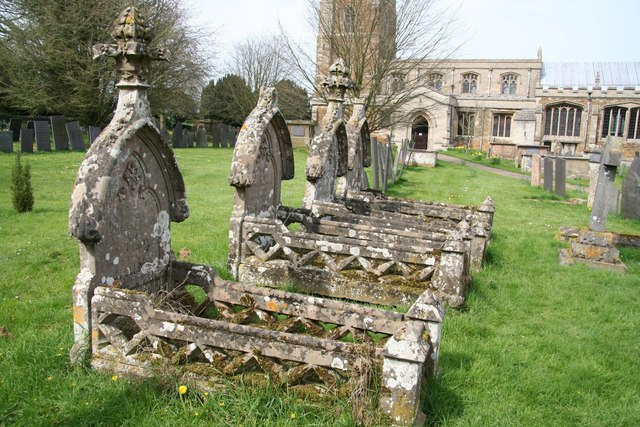
Graves in the churchyard

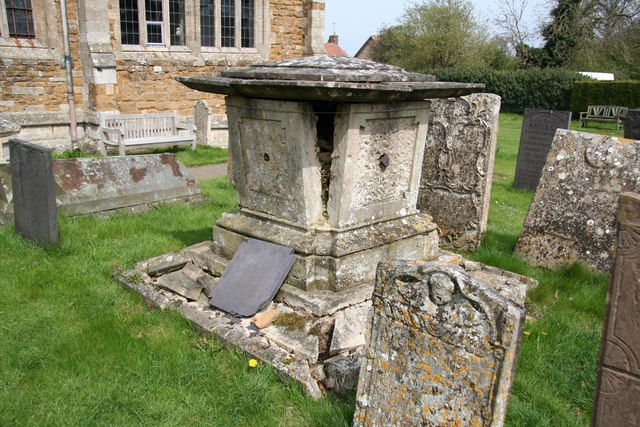
Churchyard tomb chest

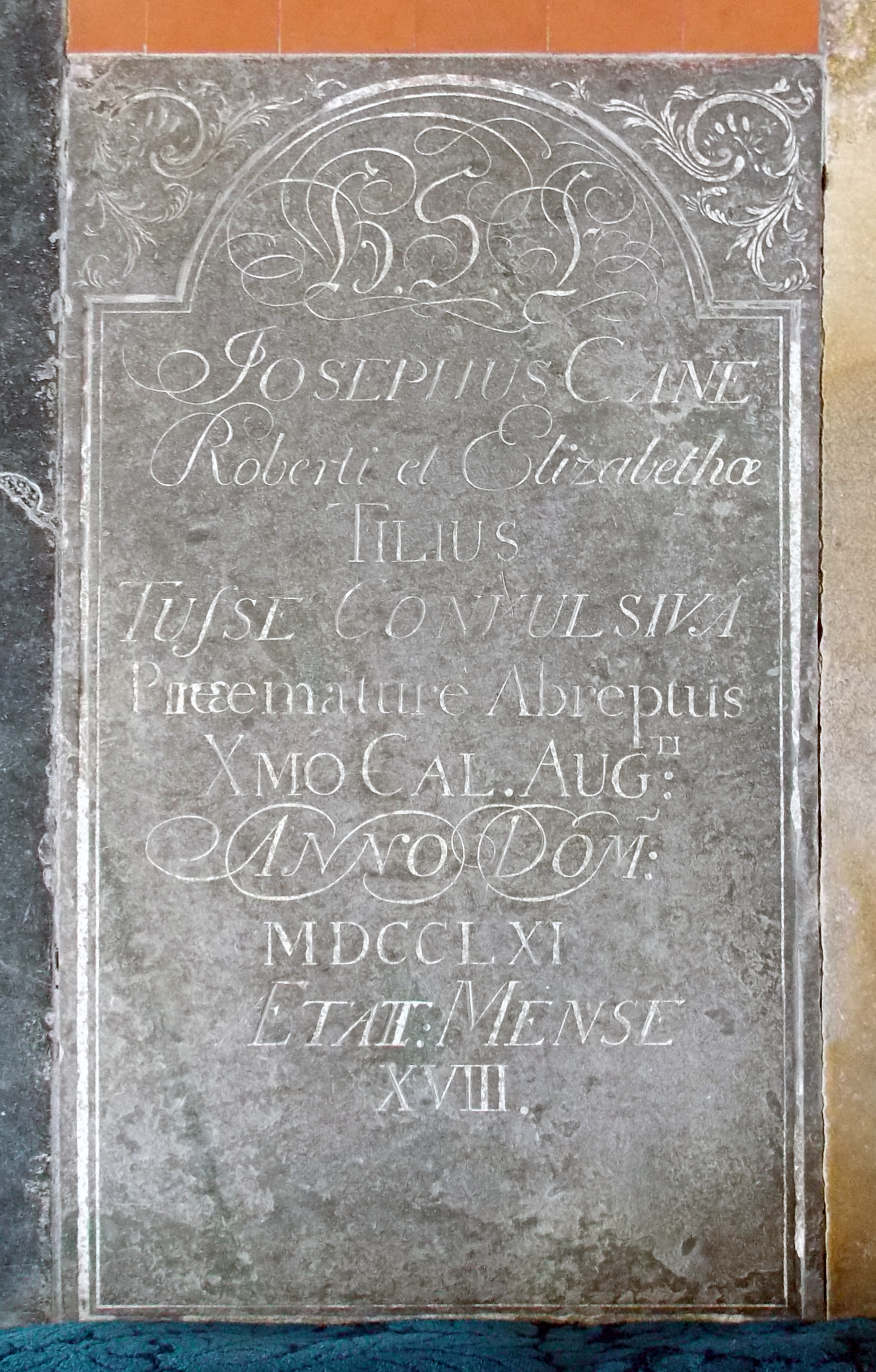
Chancel tomb slab to rector Robert Cane's son, Joseph

St Mary and St Peter's Church is a Grade I listed Church of England parish church dedicated to Saint Mary and Saint Peter in Harlaxton, Lincolnshire, England. The church is 2 miles (3 km) south-east from Grantham, and at the eastern edge of the Vale of Belvoir in South Kesteven.

St Mary and St Peter's is noted in particular for its association with and memorials to the Harlaxton Manor Gregory and de Ligne families, c.1410 effigies of Sir Richard Rickhill and his wife, Elizabeth, and the church's 19th-century restoration by John Oldrid Scott

The church is within the Harlaxton conservation area. It is in the ecclesiastical parish of Harlaxton and is part of the Harlaxton Group of Parishes in the Deanery of Loveden and the Diocese of Lincoln. Other churches in the same group are St Andrew’s, Denton; All Saints’, Stroxton; St James’, Woolsthorpe; and St Catherine's, Wyville.

== History ==
St Mary and St Peter's parish register dates from 1558 and includes that of Wyville with Hungerton up to 1813.

No church or priest for Harlaxton is mentioned in the 1086 Domesday Book. According to English Heritage, between 1174 and 1185 land at Harlaxton to build a church was provided by William the Conqueror’s granddaughter Matilda. By 1535 Harlaxton held one of the nine chantries within the deanery of Grantham. The present church structure dates, in parts, from the late 12th century, with later additions and alterations in the 13th, 14th and 15th centuries. The church spire was restored in 1885, and the interior in 1856-58 at which time the south porch was rebuilt. The interior was again restored in 1890-91 by John Oldrid Scott at a cost of £1,200—Pevsner believes this later Scott work "grossly over-restored". Cox gives a further restoration date of 1898. Before the 1856 restoration an "elegant" Gothic carved oak rood screen between the chancel and nave was noted. In 1925 a new steel bell frame was added by Loughborough Bellfoundry to the tower belfry stage, with its five 5 bells retuned and rehung. St Mary and St Peter's bells today number six, provided by bellfounders: Nottingham Foundry (c.1500), Henry Oldfield (c. 1620), Hugh Watts (1635), two by Robert Taylor (1820), and John Taylor & Co (1946). A hung sanctus bell (c. 1699), acts as a 'call to prayer' and is not part of the peal. At some point, and by a person unknown, one and a half acres of land (called a 'close'), was endowed to the rector for the ringing of the sanctus bell at 4am and 8pm each day. This land became known as 'Day Bell Close'.

The earliest record of a priest at Harlaxton is that of Gilbert de Segrave in 1291; the earliest rector at the time of the Church of England’s Secession and break with Rome being Richard Reynes in 1551. By 1795 tithes to the parish—typically payment of one-tenth of income—had been replaced by a cornrent, whereby payments were made in corn rather than money. Land for this purpose comprised 63 acres (0.3 km^{2}) of glebe—land used to support a parish priest—with net income obtained from such, £760. In 1855 the parish incumbent was Rev Henry Mirehouse MA, who held a living and rectory of a yearly value of £550 and about 200 acres (0.8 km^{2}) of glebe land under the patronage of the prebendary of South Grantham. By 1885 the living and rectory—which had attained a gross yearly value of £586 and included a residence in the gift of Queen's College, Oxford—had been held since 1867 by Rev Edward Garfit MA of St John's College, Cambridge, who was also a prebendary of Lincoln Cathedral. By 1933 the rectory had united with Wyville with Hungerton, with a joint net yearly value £547, including glebe land and residence—these in the alternate gift of Queen's College, Oxford, and T. S. Pearson Gregory DL JP—and had been held since 1920 by Rev Alban Sackett Hope MA of Queen's College, Oxford.

St Mary and St Peter's received a National Heritage Grade I building listing in 1966.

An archeological Watching Brief was held in 2005 during trench groundwork at the south, west and north of the church to establish pipes for a new heating system. During the work evidence of earlier building was not discovered but a stone fragment was uncovered together with a number of small bones and a skull.

St Mary and St Peter's received funding for repairs to epitaphs from The Society of Antiquaries of London under its William and Jane Morris Fund.

== Architecture ==
=== Exterior ===
St Mary and St Peter's is of ironstone and limestone-ashlar construction. It comprises a chancel, north and south chancel side-chapels, nave, north and south aisles, west tower and a south porch, and is of Perpendicular style with elements of Early English and Tudor.

The church four-stage tower is of Gothic Decorated style below, and Perpendicular above. The lower early 14th-century three stages are of coursed ironstone with limestone ashlar cornerstone dressings; the top late 14th-century stage is entirely ashlar, as are the battlements, pinnacled at each corner, and the crocketed recessed octagonal spire. The spire is topped by a finial with weathercock, and at its lower part contains a single run of twin-light pointed arch lucarnes, these on each alternate face, each set-in gables with a globed device attached above. The tower is drained by one gargoyle centrally placed on each side below the battlements. Each corner is buttressed to the full height of the tower on the west side and from the nave and aisles upwards on the east. Clasping buttresses run to the top of the third (belfry) stage, and angled buttresses run over the fourth. The tower first stage contains one large pointed arch Decorated window, this on the west side, with no hood mould and plain glazed with twin lights (lancets) leading to trefoil heads. The central mullion runs to an oval rosette with quatrefoil insets, characteristic of c.1250-1310 Geometrical tracery. The second stage contains small and narrow single light windows on all but the east side. The third stage lies above the line of the nave, with the achievement of a single window on all sides. Each of these windows are of similar pattern to the bottom stage west window, but smaller, with transom—separating horizontal bar—and with an attached hood mould. The fourth stage windows are elongated versions of the third stage, but with added label stops at the spring of the hood mould. The tower sits on a simple moulded socle (plinth) topped by a cill band—angled projection that allows water to flow from a building face—which continues around the whole church apart from the south aisle.

The nave is defined only by the clerestory above the abutted north and south aisle roofs, and a gable surmounted by a cross running from the clerestory's coped parapet as it meets the east chancel. The clerestory contains vertically segmented clear glazed twin-light windows, four each north and south, all containing panel tracery—a Perpendicular style of upright straight openings above lower lights—within flattened arches with hood moulds with label stops.

Attached to the nave are the north and south aisles. The early 15th-century north aisle is of string-coursed ashlar, buttressed, with four windows of same appearance and style—rectilinear with inset three lights of simple round head, diamond-pattern leaded clear glazing, and flattened hood moulds. Three windows are placed on the north wall, the fourth serves as the aisle west window. Between the two north wall western windows is a simply moulded and slightly pointed door opening with hood mould and label stops, and a carved finial above. Within is a face-hinged oak door. The north aisle parapet is deeply crenellated to the same style as the tower battlements. Above the windows runs a moulding, defining the roof edge at the base of the parapet, holding two gargoyles which drain the aisle roof. Two double-stepped angle buttresses support the aisle on its north wall, with a third diagonal buttress at the north-west corner.

The south aisle shows a plain parapet above coursed ironstone with ashlar edgings reflecting the lower stages of the tower. Three three-light windows, one plain glazed to the west of the porch, two stained to the east, are of same style to those of the north aisle, but with added facetted details between the head arches and the frames. The 1858-rebuilt ashlar south porch, which Pevsner describes as "imitation Early English", is entered though a pointed arch moulded opening supported by three columns, with a hood mould with label stops above. The porch roof parapet is coped and runs into the south aisle parapet, and above the doorway opening rises to a shallow pointed gable surmounted by a cross of Celtic appearance. On the west and east side are flat headed windows with twin lights, clear glazing, and tracery, and hood moulds with personified label stops. Inside the porch the nave door, with its elaborate hinges and handle surrounds, is set within a pointed arch opening surrounded by a multi-facetted moulded arch supported by columns with floriate capitals.

The chancel with its side chapels—all c. 1325-1350 except north chapel early 15th century—are string-coursed: chancel east wall entirely ashlar; south chapel walls ironstone with east wall ashlar above; and north chapel ashlar with ironstone at its east half below a window cill band that continues onto the east wall of chapel and chancel. The chapel parapets are deep crenelated repeats of the tower battlements. At the east wall the parapets follow the angled roof line of both chapels and meet a plain coped gable at the east chancel wall. Four pinnacles define the corners of the chapels and the edge of the chancel gable. The pinnacles, faced with gable and finial devices, are crocketed with grotesques. Further pinnacles are placed at the west corner and centre of the south chapel. The chancel and north chapel east wall is supported by three-step buttresses—two defining the edge of the chancel, and one at the north chapel corner which is diagonal. A two-step angled buttress supports the south chapel east corner. A further two buttresses support both chapels on the north and south sides.

The central chancel east window is of five lights, separated by transom; the ten segments rise to pointed arches with cinquefoils—lobes formed by the overlapping of five circles—and spandrels. The chapel window to the north is of four lights, foiled and traceried, with a central quatrefoil rosette. The smaller chapel window to the south is of three lights and foiled. The chancel and south chapel east windows contain stained glass; the north chapel is clear glazed. All three windows are pointed-arched with hood moulds. The north chapel north wall contains three windows, one rectilinear centrally placed between two pointed arched. The windows are of three lights, clear glazed, and dressed with hood moulds. The south chapel south side contains two Tudor windows, both wider than high. The window to the east is of two sections, each with three lights with arched cinquefoil heads, and is clear glazed. The window to the west is of five lights, again with arched cinquefoil heads, but with panel tracery above. Both windows are dressed with flattened arch hood moulds with label stops. Beneath the west window is a flattened-arch door opening with oak-panelled iron-studded door set within.

=== Interior ===
The church is rendered throughout, with mid-19th-century plain wooden roofs supported by simple arch-braces, finished at their spring by carved stone corbel angels.

The nave contains bays with double chamfered pointed arch arcades. The north late 12th-century arcade—Transitional (Cox); Early English (Pevsner)—of four bays is supported by round late Norman piers with simple frustum-style capitals of four facets. The two west bays are separated by a wall, previously the west wall of the nave. The capital of the east pier has an additional line of floriate detailing, reminiscent of crocketing. The south Early English Decorated style early 13th-century arcade of three bays sits on octagonal piers with octagonal capitals with horizontal moulding. All capitals have been recarved.

The north aisle of the nave has at its east end, where it meets the north chancel chapel, a multi-facetted moulded arch with rounded half piers and part-octagonal capitals. Underneath the arch is the church organ. Within the aisle is a c.1888 stained glass window of three lights. On the north wall is an early 19th-century painted Royal arms, quatrefoil framed, with added note of De Ligne Gregory, rector H. Dodwell, and Thomas Plaskett. The south aisle contains two stained glass windows, one by Cox & Sons, c.1860. At the east end of the aisle is a doorway, Tudor arch headed, and spiral stairs to a loft above a previous rood screen, above which is another exit doorway. There is also a double aumbry. The arched doorway and door from the south porch is at the west bay.

The double chamfered pointed tower arch springs from double octagonal responds—half-piers attached to walls supporting an arch— with octagonal capitals. A 20th-century wooden Perpendicular screen with double doors separates lower part of the tower arch from the nave. The tower interior is unrendered, and within it, at the south-west, is a pointed arch doorway with oak door leading to the upper stages.

The chancel arch is double-chamfered on both sides with part-octagonal responds and crenellated capitals. At the lower part is a late 19th-century wooden rood screen of Perpendicular style, of three sections—voided in the centre section and void above with panelling below in the outer, and tracery above in all, the top line with crenellations. The chancel and both side chapels are separated by screens of the same style and date and include openings to the north and south chapels. Sited at the face of the screens within the chancel, and part of the same design, are choir stalls of mirror repeat. Behind the screens are chapels, north and south, each defined by two Perpendicular chancel bays, the north with heavily moulded arches, the south double-chamfered. The north is set on side responds and central piers of semi-circular facets with hollows between, and part-octagonal capitals. The south is set on half-pier responds on part-octagonal capitals attached to extension of the arch double-chamfer. The chancel stained glass east window is by Ward and Hughes, c.1970. On either side of the window is a corner niche with 19th-century figures. Further church stained glass is by Powell & Sons.

Both north and south chapels have canopied niches: the south chapel one each either side of a c.1916 stained glass window; the north, one at the north-east corner. The north chapel also contains a piscina. In the south chapel at the east wall, in an opening leading from the chapel to the chancel, is a blind doorway. At the south side is a piscina, an aumbry and a stoup. There is an elaborate canopied relief tomb niche, without tomb, with internal arch, with decorative bosses above, holding a cinquefoil with foliate bosses attached, and spandrels containing shields. The south chapel west stained glass window is c.1892. The north chapel has mirrored a more elaborate tomb niche including spandrels containing angels holding shields, and a castellated top with foliate cross.

The church Perpendicular (Pevsner) or Decorated (Cox) octagonal font is c.1400, although re-cut, and includes a carving of Christ holding a chalice.

Pevsner notes the church holding a chalice, cover and paten by David Willaume, dated 1711; a silver-gilt flagon by John Ward, dated 1713; a silver-gilt almsbasin by John Ward, dated 1714; a waiter by Daniel Smith & Robert Sharp, dated 1780; and a secular flagon by J. Denzilow, dated 1781.

== Memorials ==
Within the north chapel, beneath the canopied niche on the north wall is an early 15th-century tomb memorial with two recumbent alabaster figures, attributed to Sir Richard Rickhill and his wife, Elizabeth. Cox attributes the tomb differently, to William Rickhill, Justice of the Common Pleas, and his wife Elizabeth, c.1410. Also in the north chapel is a table tomb with inlaid black marble panels, and a black marble lid with the inscription: "Sir Daniel De Ligne died the 20th day of March 1686 [and] The Lady Elizabeth his wife died the 25th of Aprill 1682", and heraldic shield above. The Flemish De Ligne family purchased the manor of Harlaxton in the 17th century.

A marble wall memorial on the north chapel north wall, erected 1742, comprises an engraved plaque, this below an entablature with floriate details topped by a cockerel. Below the entablature, and either side, hangs gathered drapes. Below the plaque is an apron with Baroque scrollwork decoration, and a centred scroll-edged coat of arms. The arms contain three white cockerels on blue field to the left, and three gold lion heads on a black bar with five gold bars, on a red field to the right. The memorial is dedicated to Daniel de Ligne (died 12 December 1730) and Cadwallader Glynne (died 1 January 1736), the nephew and heir of Daniel de Ligne. The monument notes that Glynne had bequested a yearly amount of £5 to be distributed to the poor of Harlaxton parish in perpetuity. Further dedications on this plaque are to Anna Maria Glynne (died 28 November 1729), only daughter of Cadwallader Glynne, and Dorothy (died 5 August 1747), wife of Glynne and daughter of Benjamin Burell of Pethall, Devon. A further marble wall memorial in north chapel, comprising plaque with draped urn above and apron below, is to George Gregory (died 1758), and his wife Ann (died 1785), erected by their four sons—Ann had inherited the estates of Daniel De Ligne after the death of Cadwallader Glynne.

In the south chapel there is a commemorative brass plaque to William Strood and his wife Agnes, both of whom died in 1448. Also are three marble tablets to the Gregory family. One has an ogee-arched head with cinquefoil and bosses surmounted by a foliate cross, with square columns either side each topped with a crocketted pinnacle. The second—in the shape of a tomb face, of white marble and topped with coat of arms, sitting on and set in front of a black marble support—is dedicated to Daniel Gregory (died 9 June 1819, aged 72), the fourth son of George Gregory of Harlaxton and his wife, Anne. The monument was provided by the deceased's brother George De Ligne Gregory. The third, of similar style, but topped by a knight's helmet and two coat of arms, is dedicated to George De Ligne Gregory (1 May 1740 - 24 August 1822).

Dedication of the chancel east stained glass window is given on a commemorative brass plaque on the south wall: "This window was placed by his widow to the memory of John Sherwin Gregory Esqu. of Harlaxton Manor & of Brancote Hills in the county of Notts, High Sheriff for the latter county in 1829, magistrate for the counties of Nottingham & Derby & Deputy Lieutenant for the counties of Lincoln and Nottingham. Married Catherine, 3rd daughter of Robert Holden Esqu.of Nutthall Temple, Notts & died June 7th 1869 aged 85 & was buried at Bramcote. Deeply and deservedly lamented by his numerous friends and relatives." A handed brass plaque on the north wall is "In memory of William Henry Simcox. Rector of this parish, who entered into rest May 4th 1889, aged 46."

The north aisle east stained glass window is dedicated, by brass plaque, to a Henry Hemsley (died 24 February 1888), and was erected by his neighbours and parishioners. To the left, between this and the aisle central window, is a memorial with pointed head and apron below, containing two round-headed panels with scrolling and shell device above. The left panel shows a dedication to "Arabella wife of Edward Saul, Clerk, a vertuous woman lovely in her life and lamented in her death. April 16, 1726, in the 36 year of her age. Leaving issue two daughters." Below is "Beaumont Saul, the younger, after a languishing sickness, supported with piety and meekness, resigned her soul to God, June 26, 1736 in the 21 year of her age" and "Cassandra Beaumont a primitive christian widow. Full of good works and alms deeds, near to the bodys of her much loved and lamented daughter and grand daughter, directed her own to be interred Sept. 27 1742, the 91 year of her age." The right panel shows, at the top, a dedication to "Arabella the elder daughter marryd to Rich. Herring of Newark in the county of Nottingham, Gent." Further down is that to "Edward Saul A. M. Prependary of Lincoln and from the year 1705, rector of this parish; to the memory of his wife and family, deserving all marks of respect and affection from him erected this monument 1744. and died September the 12th 1753, aged 77".

A chancel floor slate grave slab is to Joseph Cane (1761), son of Robert Cane (rector) and his wife, Elizabeth, "prematurely snatched away" in less than a month through a convulsive cough. A further chancel stone floor slab, now badly worn, is noted by Turnor to be to the memory of James Morrison, cleric (died 1705, aged 33), and set by his "grieving widow", Eleanor. A nave floor slab is that to Arabella (died 25 May 1740, aged 1 year 3 months), and Richard (died 30 March 1741, aged 1 year 1 month), the children of Beaumont and Mary Leeson. Mary Leeson (died 21 May 1770, aged 53 years), the widow of "Beaumont Leeson of Sutterton" and the mother of Arabella and Richard, is also commemorated on the same slab.

On the tower arch is a framed memorial to Alban Sackett Hope, rector from 1920 to 1943. The text also notes that a treble bell was added to the peal by Hope's family and parishioners in 1946. Within the tower are two lozenge-shaped black-framed coat of arms funerary hatchments, one at the north, one at the south, each containing the motto "Resurgam" (I shall rise again), within a scroll. Also within the tower is a framed text originally sited over the arch of the belfry:

Benefactors to the parish of Harlaxton 1632. John Usher of the Isle of Ely, 1701, and Edward Deligne Gent; Natives of Harlaxton gave each of them the sum of ten pounds; the interest to be distributed yearly to the blind, lame, aged, and impotent people, and poorer widows, of the said parish. 1730. Cadwallader Glynne Esqu. gave the yearly sum of five pounds to the poor of the parish of Harlaxton, to be distributed yearly at Easter by the ministers and church wardens for the time being for ever. 1742. Cassandra Beaumont widow, gave ten pounds, the yearly interest to be layed out in books according to her direction.

Within the church is a memorial plaque to those killed during the First World War.

== Churchyard ==
The churchyard contains fifteen Grade II listed chest tombs, and five Grade II listed headstones.

The chest tombs date from the early to mid-19th-century and are of limestone ashlar. They contain, variously, moulded plinths, slate tablets or panels either square-shaped or oval, and hipped tops. One is topped by a slate slab. Two are coffin shaped. Three contain at their corners, either buttresses, pilasters, or half-balusters. One has an arch-shaped headstone attached. Another, large and shaped like a sarcophagus, has rebates—continuous notch cut into an edge—at corners, a deep cornice, and a gabled top. Ascribed tombs are one to 'R Brewin of Grantham', and two to 'Green of Denton'. A chest tomb, dated 1813, is to Henry Blakelock (and family), who was the upholsterer for the Duke of Rutland.

The listed headstones are all early to late 18th-century, except one, 1809, and of slate. They are flat topped or arch topped, one shoulder-arched—arch top corners leading to a raised flat top—with skull and bones above. On three the inscriptions are set within panels. One is ascribed to the mason Stephen Staveley of Melton. A further seven late 18th and early 19th-century headstones are listed as of special architectural or historic interest.

== Parish priests ==
List of rectors, vicars and curates from the Clergy of the Church of England database, Edmund Turnor's Collections for the History of the Town and Soke of Grantham Containing Authentic Memoirs of Sir Isaac Newton, church commemorative plaques, and Kellys Directory for Lincolnshire 1855/1885/1896/1905/1909/1919/1933.

- 1291 – Gilbert de Segrave
- c.1339 – Robert Wylugby
- c.1339 – John Normanton

Secession and break with Rome (1534)

- 1551 – Richard Reyns (rector)
- 1554 – William Carnicke (rector)
- 1558 – Ralph Caludley (rector)
- 1573 – Robert Wryghte (curate)
- 1574 – Richard Raynes (rector)
- 1574 – Ralph Calverley (rector)
- 1574 – Robert Wright (curate)
- 1582 – Edmund Blackburn (curate)
- 1585 – Ralph Calverley (rector)
- 1597 – Nicholas Robineson (curate)
- 1597 – Ralph Calverley (rector)
- 1604 – Nicholas Robinson (curate/schoolmaster)
- 1611 – John Barkesdale (rector)
- 1613 – Johes Barkeseale (preacher)
- 1614 – Nicholas Robinson (curate)
- 1614 – John Barkesdale (rector)
- 1630 – ??? Powell (vicar)
- 1638 – William Russell (curate)
- 1645 – Richard Northan (rector)
- 1646 – Richard Hyde (rector)

Interregnum (1649)
Restoration (1660)

- 1660 or 1661 – Hugh Nash (rector)
- 1666 – Timothy Quarele (curate)
- 1676 – James Harris MA (rector/preacher)
- 1676 – Hugh Nash (rector)
- 1700 – Thomas or James Harris (deacon)
- 1705 or 1706 – Edward Saul MA (rector)
- 1706 – Jacob Harris (rector)
- 1707 – Thomas Mason (curate)
- 1708 – Thomas Storer (deacon)
- 1710 – Thomas Storer (curate)
- 1754 – John Werham or Warham (rector)
- 1756 – Robert Cane BD (rector)
- 1766 – Henry Dodwell MA (rector)
- 1803 – George Henderick (curate)
- 1811 – John Earle Welby (curate)
- 1814 – Thomas Plaskett (stipendiary curate)
- 1826 – Thomas Henry Mirehouse (rector)
- 1826 – Robert Dodwell (rector)
- 1828 – Thomas Plaskett (stipendiary curate)
- 1835 – Thomas Henry Mirehouse (rector)
- 1844 – J. White (rector)
- 1867 – Edward Garfit MA (rector)
- ???? – William Henry Simcox (rector)
- 1889 – George Wynne Jeudwine MA (rector)
- 1914 – Robert Powley MA (rector)
- 1920 – Alban Sackett Hope MA (rector)
- 200? – 2007 Geraldine Pond (priest in charge)
- 2009 – 2016 Keith Hanson (priest in charge)
- 2018 – 2020 Stephen Harrop (rector of Harlaxton Group of Churches)
- 2022 – Sarah Tierney (priest in charge)

== Gallery ==
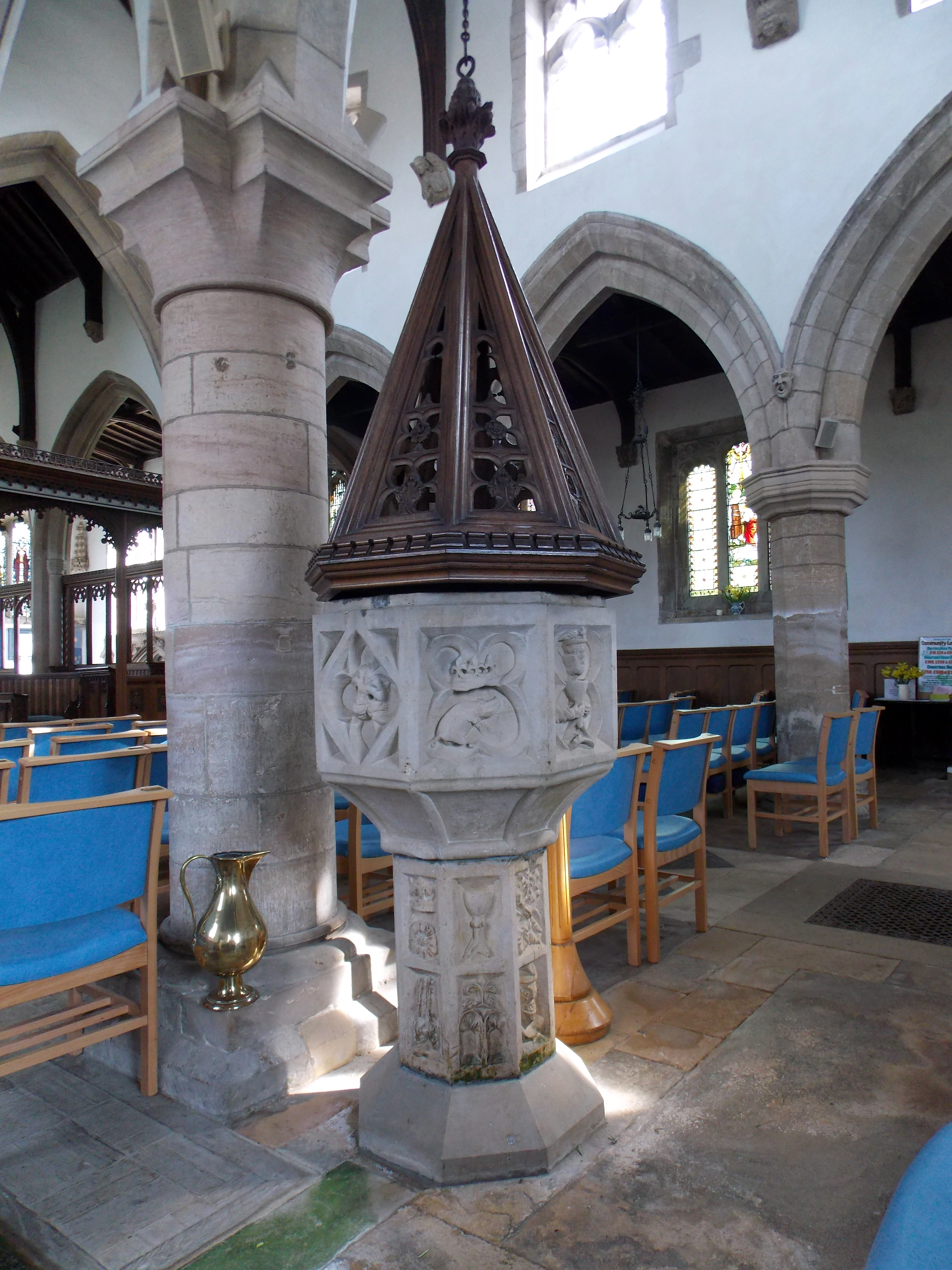
Font, c. 1400

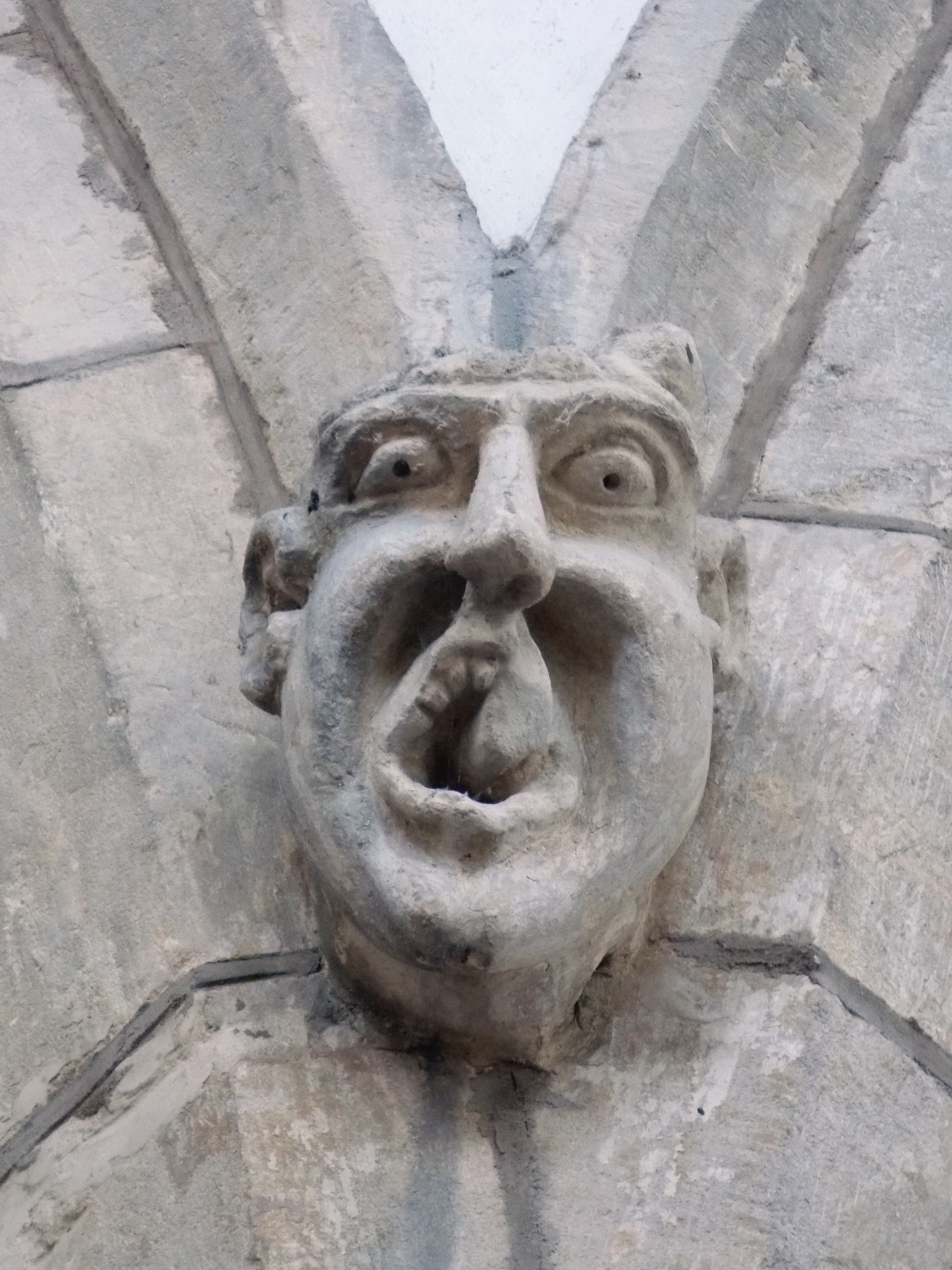
South arcade label stop

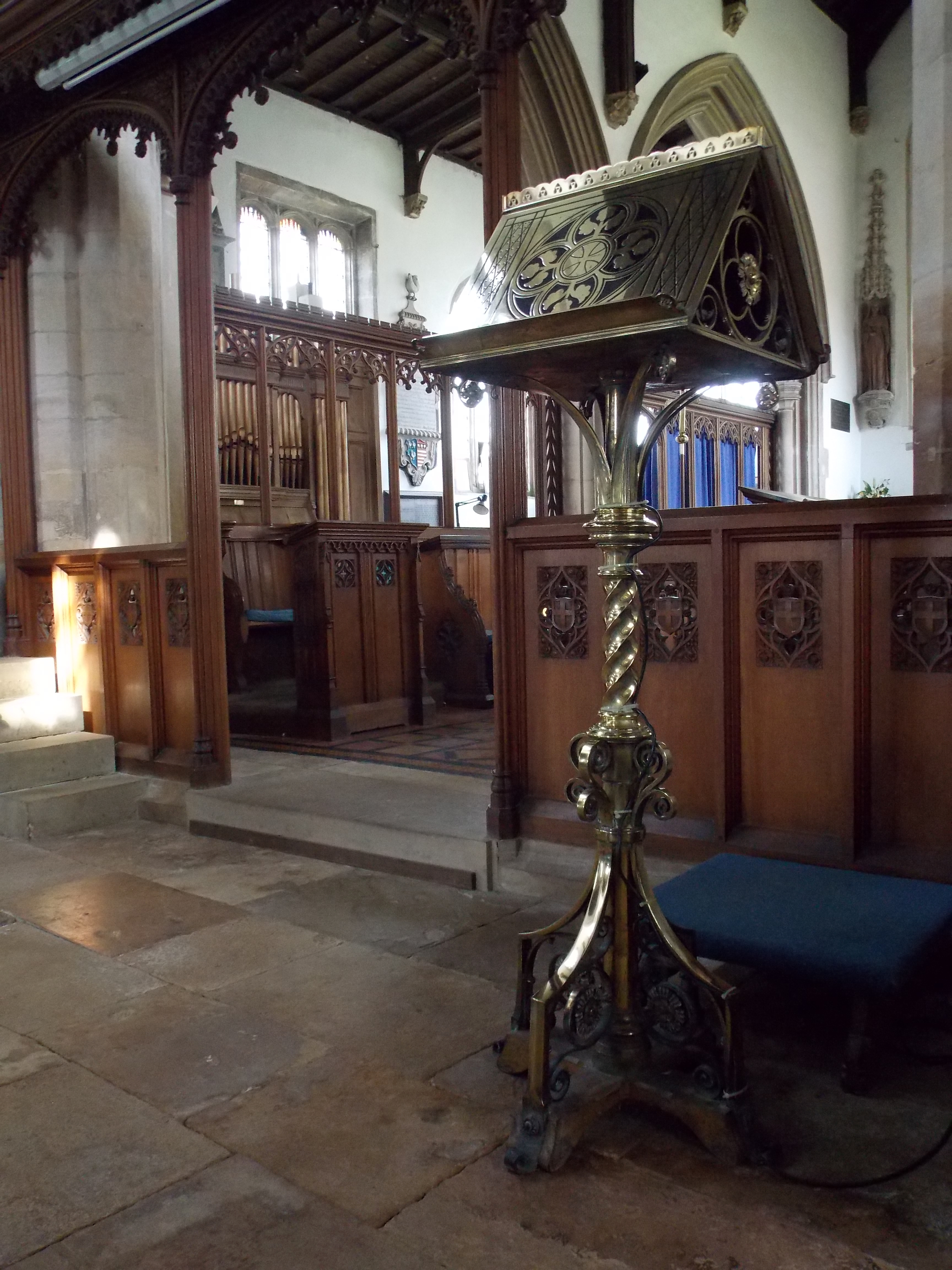
Lectern with rood screen and choir stalls

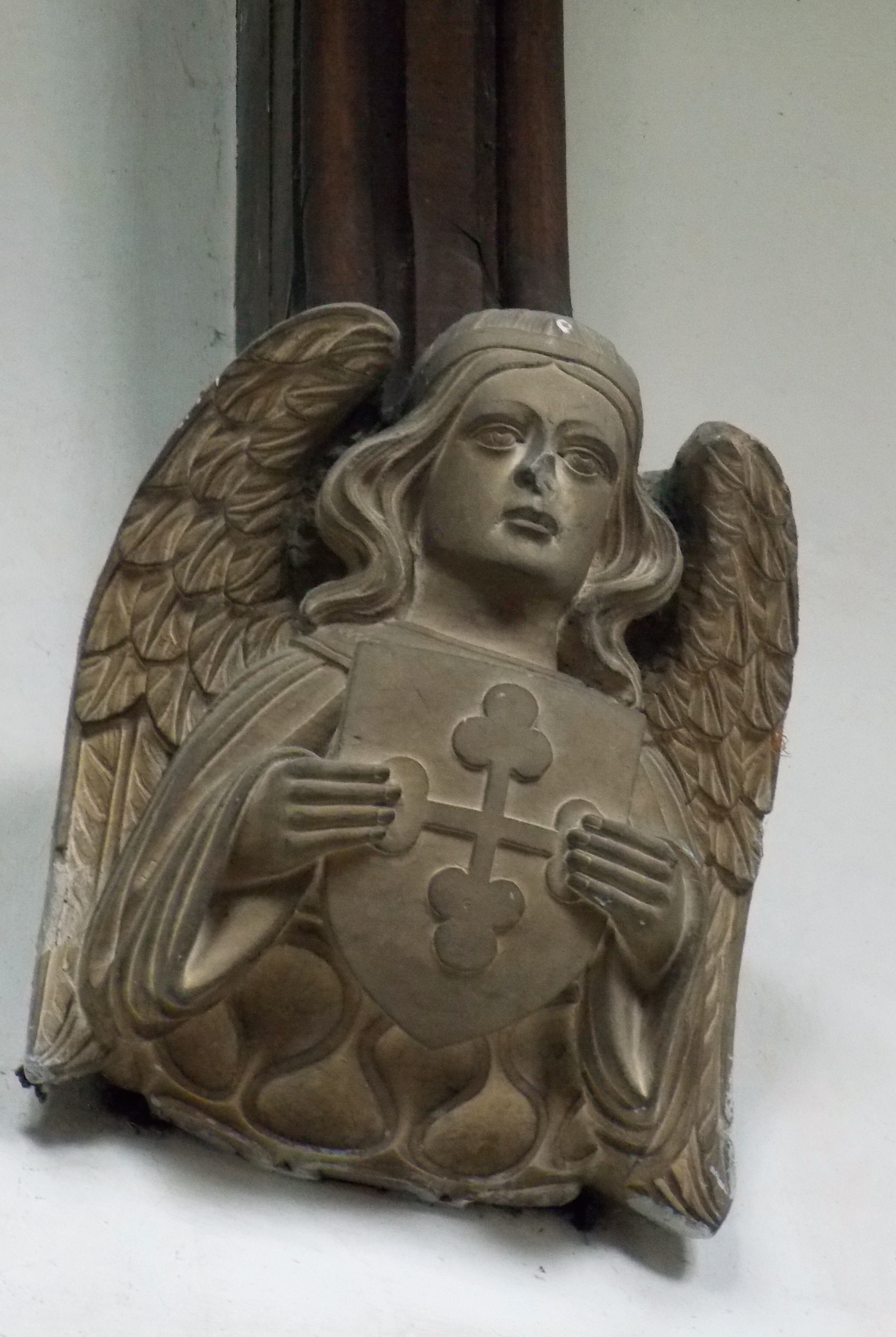
Nave corbel

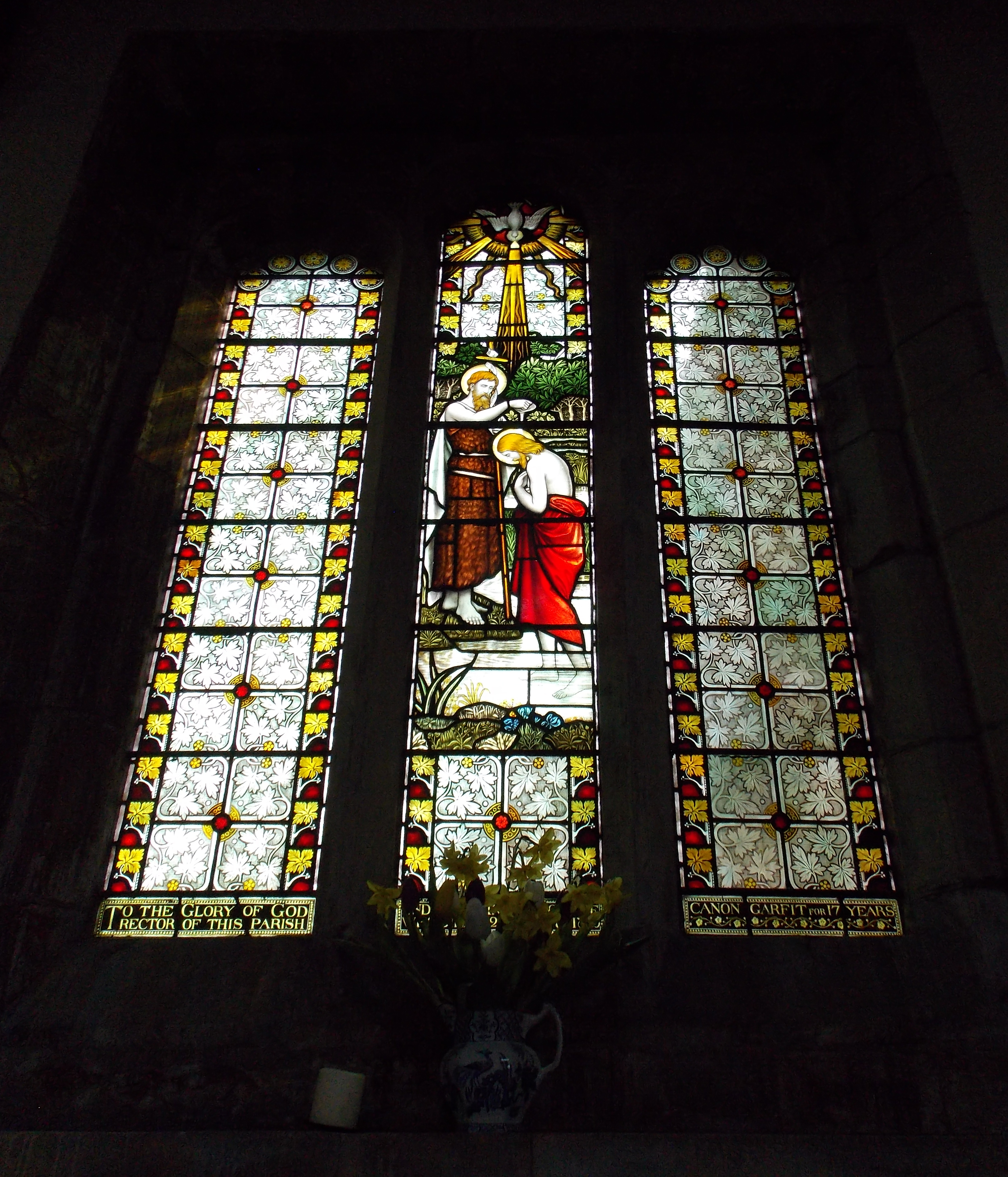
South aisle stained glass window

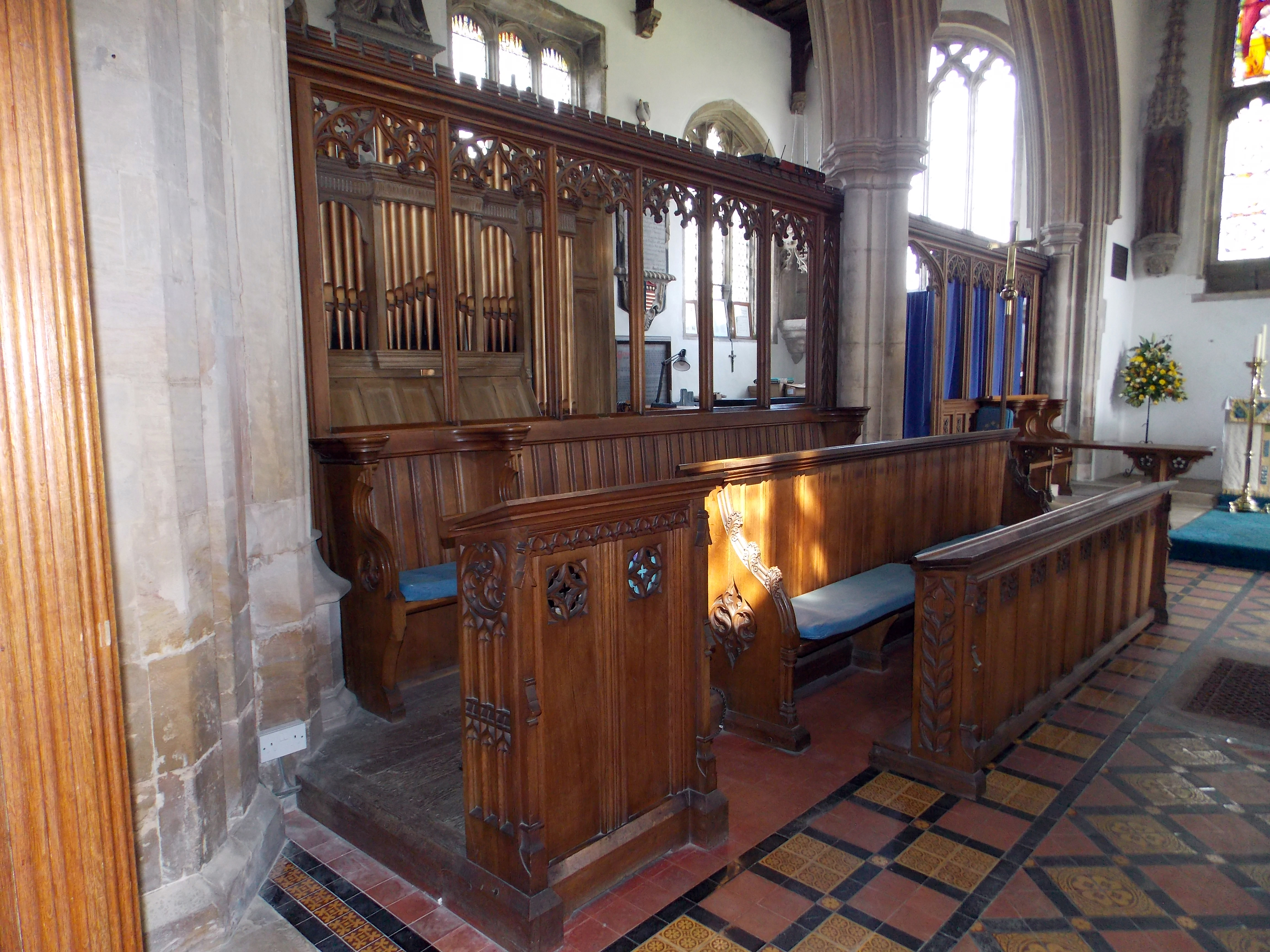
Chancel choir stalls

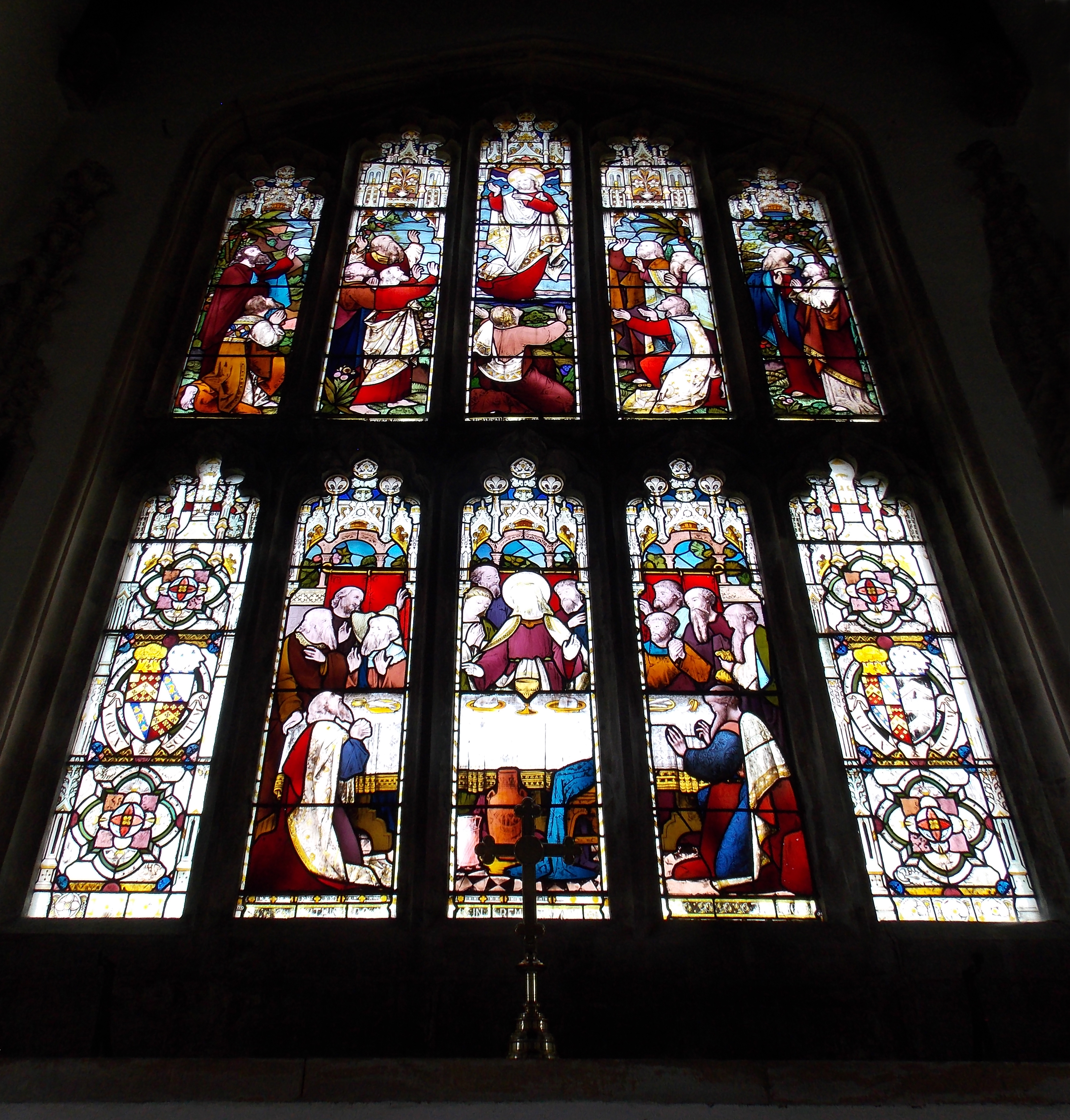
Chancel east window

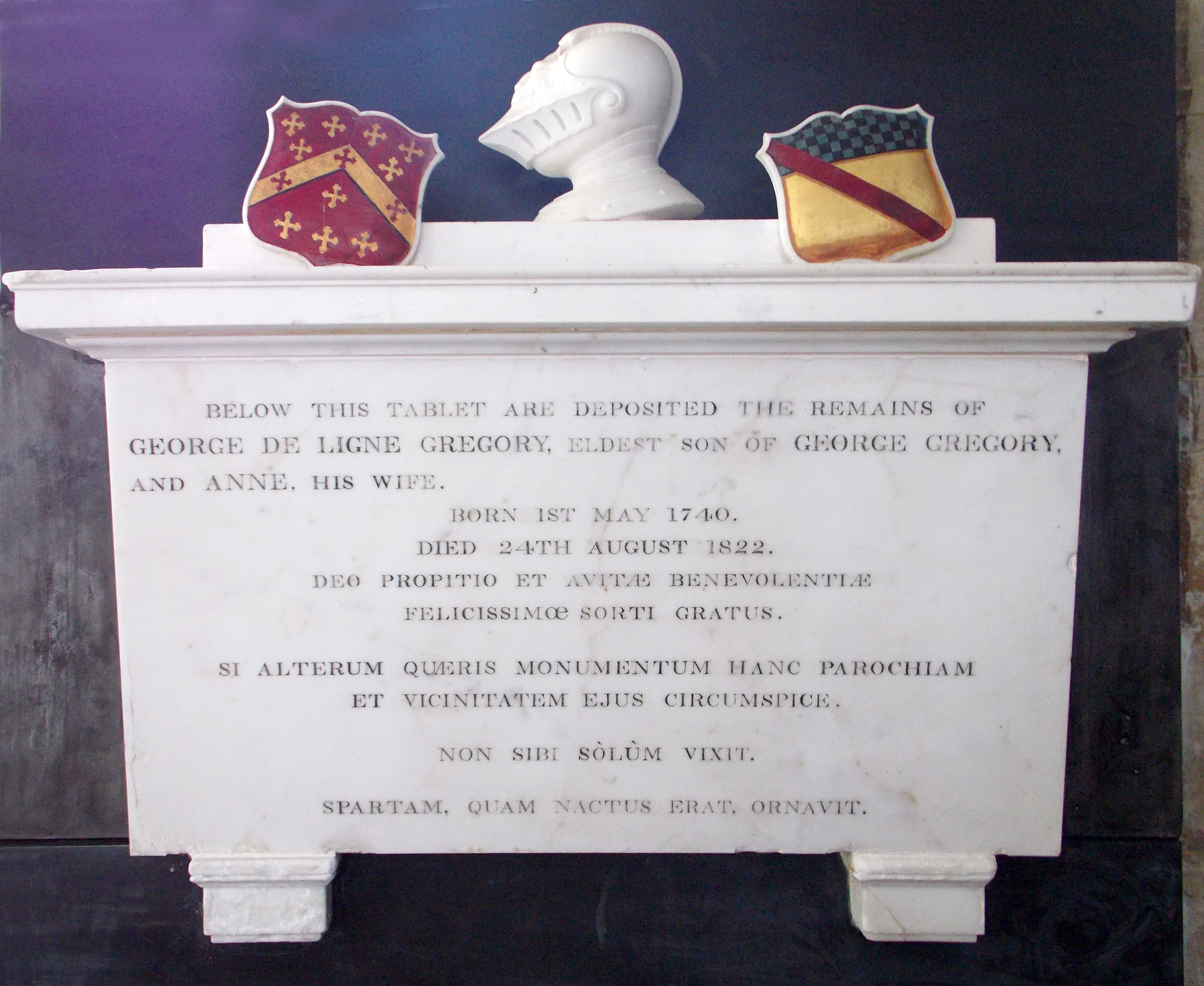
South chapel memorial to George De Ligne Gregory

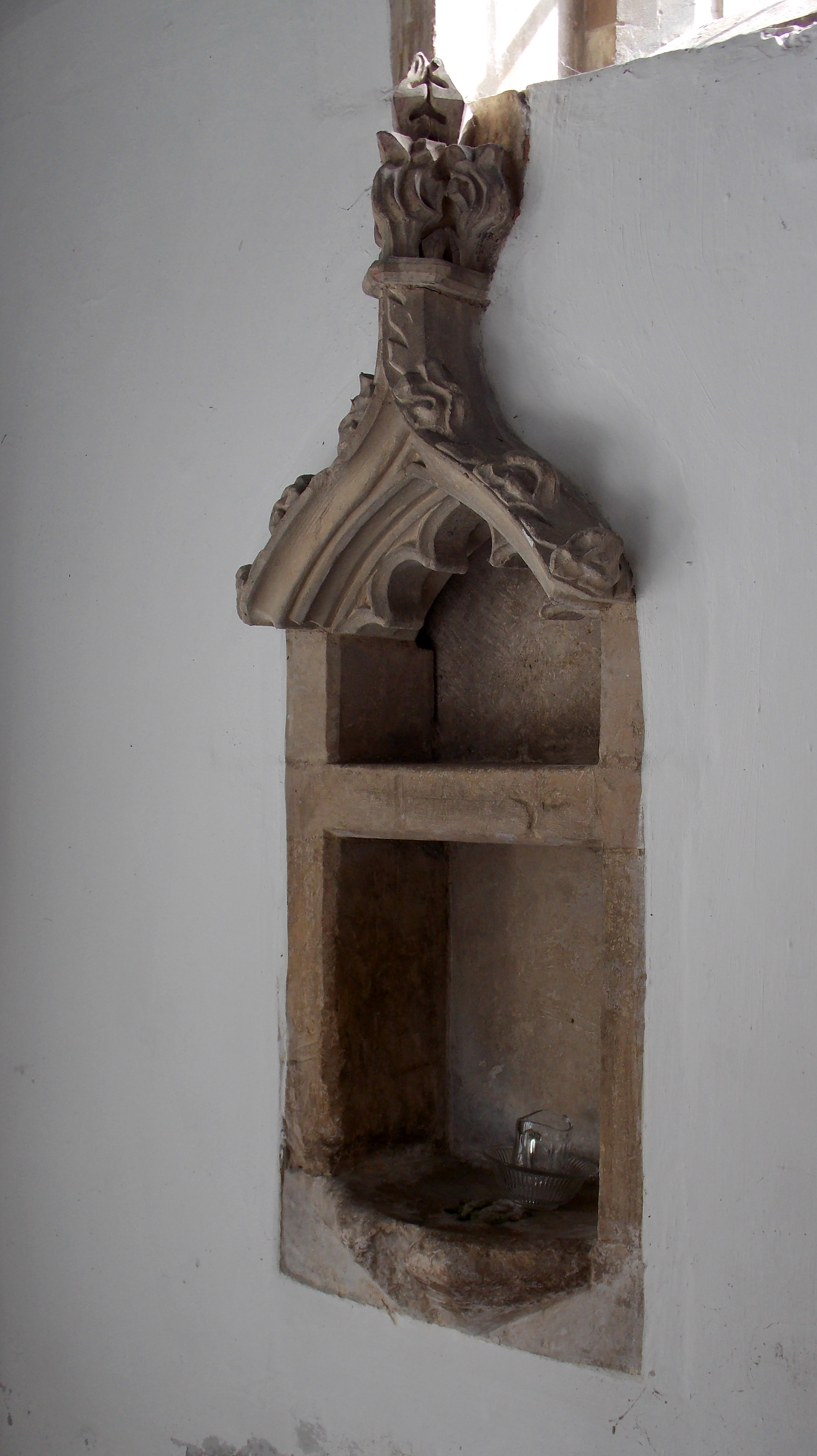
South chapel piscina

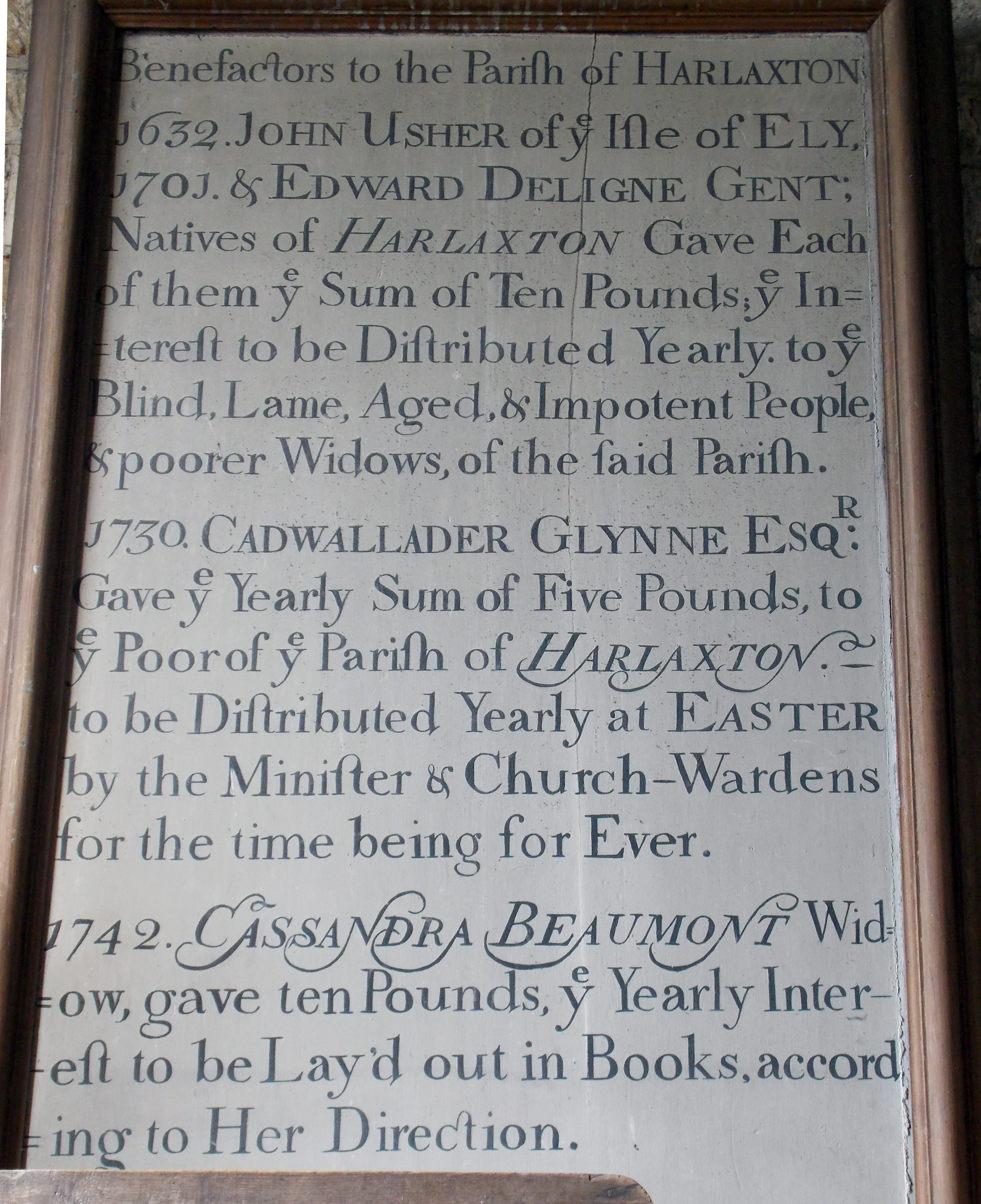
Framed text of parish benefactors
