= Brixworth Abbey =

Monastery in Northamptonshire, England

Coordinates: 52°20′02″N 0°54′17″W

Brixworth Abbey was a monastic house in Northamptonshire, England.

The church, thought to have been of basilican plan, was devastated during the Danish invasion of 876, and converted into All Saints' Church in the tenth century, when the original western entrance was formed into a tower.
