= James Jackson (historian) =

James Jackson was an Anglican clergyman, best known as the author of an analytical index to the parish register of Brixworth, where he was vicar from 1735 to 1770. His index is one of the earliest complete parish register transcripts and family reconstitution projects.

== Background and family ==
James Jackson was a son of Judas Jackson.

He married Elizabeth Benwell (buried 1754) of Henley-on-Thames and they had seven children:

- Elisabeth (1734-
- William (1735/6-1785)
- Anne
- John (1738-1775)
- Nanny (1741-
- Mary (1743-
- James (1745-

== Career ==
James was ordained deacon in 1725 and priest in 1725/6. Clergy of the Church of England Database does not contain any later record of his clerical career. He probably lived at Reading immediately before arriving at Brixworth, as his index states that his marriage took place there, as did the baptisms of his three oldest children and the burial of his daughter Anne, who was “born when the Small-Pox appeared upon her Mother”.

He was presented to the living of Brixworth in 1735 and remained there as vicar until his death 35 years later.

== Index to the Brixworth parish register ==
During the latter part of his incumbency at Brixworth, James compiled an analytical index to Brixworth families since the 16th century which incorporates information from his personal knowledge as well as entries from the parish register. It therefore includes much information about the origins and destinations of people who arrived in or migrated from the village during the 18th century. Entries are arranged in surname groups, setting out the relationships of the individuals concerned and clarifying which entries of christenings, marriages and burials refer to the same person. Various additional events that took place during the first few years after Jackson’s death were added to the work. The book has not been published and its manuscript is kept at Northamptonshire Record Office.

== Death ==
James died on 23 December 1770 and was buried at Brixworth four days later. Probate of his will was granted by the Archdeaconry Court of Northampton on 17 January 1771.
