= Hugh Watts (bellfounder) =

English bellfounder (c. 1582 – 1643)

Hugh Watts (1582/3 – 1643) was a bellfounder of Leicester in England, known for casting bells for churches in Leicestershire.

== Life ==
Watts was the second son of Francis Watts, bellfounder of Leicester (died 1600). His grandfather may have been the Hew Wat who in 1563 cast a bell for South Luffenham, Rutland.

In 1600, the year of his father's death, Watts cast for Evington in Leicestershire a bell bearing his own name and the shield with the device of three bells used by Francis Watts. The same device was borne by Northamptonshire and Bedfordshire bells made by a William Watts, and in 1450 by Richard Brayser of Norwich, to whom the original bell-founder Watts may have been apprenticed.

In 1611 Watts was admitted to the chapman's or merchant's guild; in 1620–1 he was elected chamberlain of the borough, and in 1633–4 Mayor of Leicester; he was paid the mayor's customary allowance of £3 6s 8d. A stately reception of Charles I and his queen on their progress in August 1634 took place in the year of Watts's mayoralty.

Thomas North (1830–1884), a bell historian, wrote in The Church Bells of Leicestershire (1876) that nearly 200 bells by Watts remained in the county. There were several complete rings admired for the beauty of their tone. The peal of ten bells for St. Margaret's, Leicester, was said by North to be the finest in England. Watts's favourite inscription: "J. H. S.: Nazareus: rex: Iudeorum: Fili: Dei: miserere: mei:" caused his bells to be called Watts's Nazarenes.

He worked the bellfoundry of Leicester until his death, at the age of sixty, in February or March 1642–3, and was buried in St. Mary's Church, Leicester. Shortly after the death of Watts the business was wound up and partly taken over by Nottingham founders. Watts's son, also named Hugh (1611–1656), to whom the bell metal and bellfounding appliances were bequeathed, married a daughter of Sir Thomas Burton of Stockerston.
