= Nether Heyford =

Village in Northamptonshire, England

Coordinates: 52.227221°N 1.030054°W

- Village, civil parish
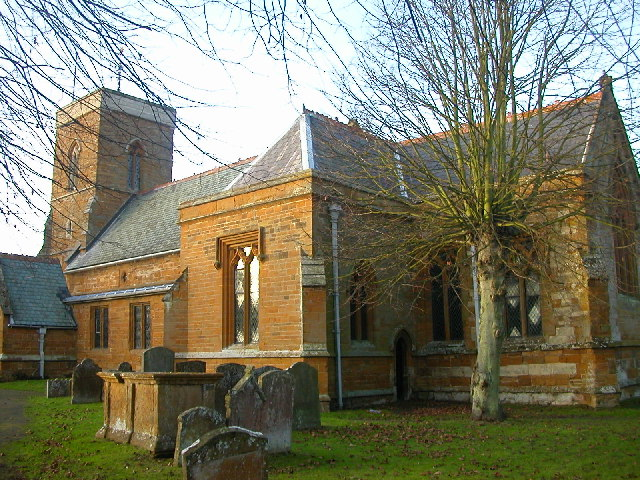
- Church of St Peter and St Paul, Nether Heyford

- Location within Northamptonshire
- Population: 1,637 (2011)
- OS grid reference: SP659587
- Unitary authority: West Northamptonshire
- Ceremonial county: Northamptonshire
- Region: East Midlands
- Country: England
- Sovereign state: United Kingdom
- Post town: Northampton
- Postcode district: NN7
- Dialling code: 01327
- Police: Northamptonshire
- Fire: Northamptonshire
- Ambulance: East Midlands
- UK Parliament: Daventry

Nether Heyford is a village and civil parish in West Northamptonshire, England, close to the M1 motorway and the A5 and A45 roads, 6 miles (10 km) west of Northampton and 70 miles (113 km) northwest of London. The smaller village of Upper Heyford is about half a mile to the north.

Nether Heyford takes its name from 'Hay ford'. Alternatively, 'hedge ford' or enclosure ford'. In 1086, in the Domesday Book, the name is recorded as "Heiforde". The Post Office once called the village Lower Heyford, but the name was restored to Nether Heyford after reference to it in local deeds. The village is on the flood plain of the River Nene and used to be subjected to flooding, as Watery Lane suggests.

In 1699, a Roman pavement was found in Harestone Meadow to the east of the village.

== Facilities ==
It has one of the largest village greens in the country, a pub (The Foresters Arms), two churches (one Anglican, one Baptist), a purpose-built youth club, park, village hall, hairdresser, butcher and a shop. The extensive playing fields have a cricket club (Heyford CC), a football club (Heyford Athletic), tennis courts and a bowls club. A second pub (the Old Sun closed in November 2023.

The Grand Union Canal passes through the village.

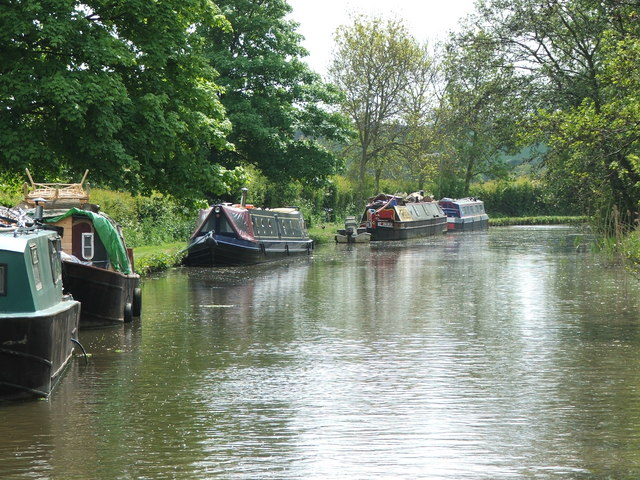
Grand Union canal near Nether Heyford

== Governance ==
The village has its own parish council, which consists of 11 members who are elected every four years.

== History ==
The area was occupied during the Roman period and two sites have been discovered.

The landholders in Heyford prior to the Norman Conquest had been Aelid and Wulfstan. With the invasion of William the Conqueror the landholding was transferred to the Bishop of Bayeux, Gilbert of Ghent, and Robert, Count of Mortain, a half brother of King William.

The Domesday Book of 1086 recorded that 'Heiford' consisted of three hides and five virgates of cultivated land. This equates to about 500 acres. There were also nineteen acres of meadow and a mill valued at 16s. There were eight ploughs in use, and the records included mention of 11 villagers, three smallholders, and four slaves.

The 1200s in Heyford saw the building of the Church. The first Rector was Ralph in 1216. It was also a period when ridge and furrow farming was at its peak. There are still several examples existing around the village.

In 1313 John de Pateshull 'levied a fine of a manor' here and in 1316 he was certified to be lord of the manor. In 1360 after the death of Sir William de Pateshull the manor was assigned to Catherine, the wife of Sir Robert de Tudenham with whose successors in continued into the 1400s. The original Manor House was at Upper Heyford and its remains can still be seen.

Heyford Manor became occupied by the Mauntells. Sir Walter Mauntell died in 1467 during the Wars of the Roses. He was buried in Heyford Church where his tomb remains. It bears portrait brasses of himself and his wife. His monumental brass shows him in armour. He was descended from Michael Mauntell of 'Rode' and married Elizabeth, daughter of John Lumley (also reputed to be of Heyford). In 1477 his son 'John Mauntell levied a fine of the Manor and 35 messuages in fee-simple'.

John Stanbridge was born at Nether Heyford in the late 1400s. He was one of the first men to prepare a book of English grammar to be printed.

Times were tempestuous for the incumbents of the manor of Heyford. The manor continued to be in the hands of the Mauntells. However, in 1541, John Mauntell, "sallying forth in company with his brother-in-law, Lord Dacre, and others on a nocturnal frolic to chase the deer in St Nicholas Pelham's Park in Sussex, encountered three men, one of whom being mortally wounded in the affray. He and his associates were convicted of murder, executed, and their estates escheated to the Crown".

Then in 1553, John's only son Walter "engaged the Kentish insurrection to approve the marriage of Queen Mary, headed by Sir Thomas Wyatt, and was taken prisoner with him, sent to the Tower, and subsequently executed in Kent on 27th Feb, 1553". He lost his estate to the Crown, though the Manor House was kept by the family because John Mauntell had made a settlement of the manor to his wife Anne. Anne took a second husband, Richard Johnson, who together with Francis Morgan, 'serjeant-in-law', 'levied a fine of the three manors of Heyford, Over Heyford, and Nether Heyford, and the Advowson of Nether Heyford.

Then Francis Morgan obtained the 'fee simple' and so the manor passed into the hands of the Morgans. Francis and his wife Anne are buried at Heyford. Francis died in 1558 and the estate passed to his son Thomas. Francis and his wife were buried in the church where their tomb can be seen. It bears a statue of them both with Francis in his judge's robes.

Meanwhile, in 1560, Heyford Grange became occupied by Thomas Judkin. It continued to be occupied by his family until 1925 on the death of Anne Judkin.

Heyford parish church acquired three of its four bells. The first two were installed in 1601, one of which was inscribed 'Thomas Morgan gave me to the Church, frank and free'. A third bell was added in 1638 and a fourth in 1704.

During the 1600s the manor estates changed hands several times. Thomas Morgan passed them to his daughter, who married Sir John Preston of Furness in Lancashire. From him the estates passed to his brother Sir Thomas Preston. In 1685 he settled the manors of Heyford and Nether Heyford on his daughter Mary, who married William Lord Herbert, son and heir of William, Earl of Powis. However, it is believed that the original Manor House building became derelict during this period. An entry in the Parish Registers of 1652 (during the Commonwealth period) states that the building was unoccupied and 'lying open to vagrants'.

In 1674, William Bliss, a native of Heyford now living in Southwark and trading in wine, endowed, via his will, the village with a sum of £400 to purchase a School House (i.e. school room) and to pay for a School Master. The School was to be free to all children living in the Heyfords and also to any children by the name of Bliss living within 5 miles. The School eventually opened in 1683 with Rev. Gray as School Master.

In 1789, the Rev Charles Crawley became Rector of Stowe. He and his family ran the churches of Heyford and Stowe under high church principles. However, he had come to the village at a time when the area was saturated with Protestantism. The Society of Friends, or Quakers, had become established in the late 1600s. Meeting houses were set up in Flore in 1678, and Bugbrooke in 1692. The minutes of these meetings showed that there were regular attendees from Heyford. The Baptist movement was also becoming established, and records of the Castle Hill Baptist Chapel in Northampton include references to members living in Heyford.

The current Manor House building near the church is believed to have been built around 1740 by William, the third Marquis of Powis, using stone from the original house at Upper Heyford. In the late 1700s it was occupied by Henry Jephcott, rector of Heyford. When he died in 1800, the property passed to his daughter Elizabeth and her husband, R B Hughes, rector of Kislingbury.

In 1750 the enclosure award for Heyford was made and the large open fields were enclosed, creating smaller fields.

=== Industrial revolution and Victorian era ===
For Heyford, the 19th century was an era of industrial development. The census of 1801 recorded a population 264 inhabitants. By 1891 it had grown to 750.

In 1793, work had begun on the construction of the Grand Junction Canal, later to become the Grand Union Canal, and it opened late in the decade as a means of transport for coal, lime, and bricks. The railway was constructed in the 1830s. These two major developments enabled the movement of coal and iron ore, which in turn allowed the development of the furnaces and the brickworks during the second half or the century. The Furnace Lane area around the canal and railway became a major source of employment for villagers.

At the other end of the village, by the river, there was the mill. This was occupied by the Cosford family from the late 1700s until the first world war. The current mill building was constructed in 1821 and later restored & extended in 1881.

By 1857 a small ironworks was established called Heyford Ironworks. It was on east of the West Coast Main Line on a piece of land bounded by the railway, the road to Upper Stowe (Furnace Lane) and the canal. It used ore from the Blisworth area mostly, but also for a short time local ore from a quarry on the other side of the railway, a little to the south at Heyford Hills. The ore was possibly transported to the works by horse and cart or by an inclined tramway up to the railway where it would have been tipped into railway wagons for the very short trip to the works. The quarry was in operation from 1863 to 1868. The works closed in the early 1890s.

On the other side of the railway on the north of Furnace Lane a second ironworks was opened in 1866. This was Stowe Ironworks. It closed shortly afterwards but was reconstructed in 1872 and in production from 1873 to 1876 and from 1890 to 1892. In the latter period steel was produced. The ore used came from the Gayton and Blisworth area, from Church Stowe (up until 1876) and possibly from other places. It was connected to the Church Stowe quarries by a standard gauge tramway using horses and from 1869 steam locomotives. This tramway also transported limestone from a quarry at Church Stowe which was used in the iron works and at lime kilns which were also on the site. The kilns were in operation more continuously than the ironworks and carried on until 1900. In 1920 the site was purchased by a brick company, and brick manufacture was carried on there until 1940. The clay used came from a claypit a short distance away and was brought by a narrow gauge tramway operated by two geared steam locomotives. The site of the works is now a small industrial estate.

Religious struggle continued during this era. The church in Heyford was run for the entire century by the Crawley family. John Lloyd Crawley was Rector from 1800 until his death in 1850. He was succeeded by his son Thomas until his death in 1897. In 1802 John Lloyd bought the Manor House so he was both Rector and Lord of the Manor. However a Rectory was built in 1851, so his son Thomas lived there instead, and the Manor House remained in the hands of his mother until she died around 1870. After then the Manor House was occupied by a series of different families.

Meanwhile, the non-conformists were also flourishing. The Baptists had been meeting in private houses until 1826 when their Chapel was built at the top of the Green at a cost of £178. The first Methodist Chapel was built in 1838 at the top of Church Street, followed by a new larger one lower down the Street in 1879.

In 1865 a concert was held in the school room 'for the benefit of those who left their homes when on fire'. A poster announced that 'Mr Beaver of Flore (the blind organist) will preside at the harmonium'.

In the 1860s a new house was built for the schoolmaster, the Laurels in Middle Street. The Education Act of 1870, which required all children to have a basic education meant that a new modern school was required. The current school building was opened on 5 January 1880 as three departments, infants, girls, and boys with Henry Smith as schoolmaster. The girls and infants entered by the doorway indicated by the carving above it. The boys entered via the "boys entrance", removed in 1911. The boys and girls were not allowed to mix, and there was a six-foot-high wall between the playgrounds. Three schoolmasters were sacked during the next 20 years: one for 'playing his flute around the villages', one for 'playing football with the boys' and one for refusing to teach a night school without any extra pay.

=== 20th century ===
In 1900 the policeman from Bugbrooke cycled to Heyford to pin the Boer War call-up notice on the parish notice board. The Weedon Barracks was nearby and a number of its reservists lived at Heyford.

Although the parish council had been established in the 1890s, following the Local Government Act 1894, it was not until 1901 that the first minutes appeared, under chairman Thomas Faulkner.

The Rev Isham Longden was accredited with founding the cricket club in the early 1900s. Then around 1908, the newly formed 'South Northants Football League' was inaugurated. A meeting was held at the Foresters Arms where it was decided to enter a team into the League and the Heyford Athletic Football Club was formed.

At the outbreak of the First World War in 1914, nineteen men from the village had travelled to the barracks in Northampton to enlist. More were to follow as they became old enough. By 1918, twenty-three of Heyford's young men had died. During the war, many women from the village worked in a munitions factory on the site of the old Express Lift company in Northampton. In February 1921 the war memorial was unveiled.

In 1922 a public telephone was installed on the corner of the Green, and the Baptist Chapel School Room was built at a cost of £838. In 1924 gas street lighting was installed and in 1927 an area was set aside on the Green for the children to play on. In November 1930, the Heyford WI was formed, and in 1938 the WI first approached the parish council about the possibility of a village hall, but another 20 years were to pass before it was eventually built.

In 1939 the parish bought the Roberts Field allotments. In October that year the canal burst its banks at Weedon. This caused the flooding of the river valley and the floodwater spread into the Church Street area.

Following the outbreak of the Second World War, in September 1939 parties of evacuee children began to arrive. Heyford had its own 'Dad's Army' under the leadership of Charlie Highfield, the 24th platoon F company of the 11th Northamptonshire Regiment of Home Guards.

In 1940 the brickworks in Furnace Lane were closed. This was followed soon after by the closure of the Bricklayers Arms on the canal bridge.

In September 1951 a rail crash occurred just outside the Stowe tunnel. 15 people died and 36 were injured. Villagers went to help the casualties. In the same year, the letting of the green for the grazing of cows ceased. In 1952 the mains water and sewage were connected to the village. This marked the end of the need for the four village 'taps' and the Friday night 'toilet cart'. In 1958 work began on the construction of the Village Hall, which was built by village volunteers and opened in 1960.

In 1956 the school became one for infants and juniors only; the seniors had to go to school in Duston, and later Bugbrooke.

During the late 1950s construction of the M1 motorway began. Some of its waste was used to fill in the old clay pits at the brickworks. The route of the A45 into Northampton was altered to accommodate the bridge at junction 16, and in 1959 the motorway was opened.

During the 1960s, many new houses were built and the population doubled, bringing many newcomers and a modern village emerged. This decade saw the building of the entire Wilsons Estate, and the complete redevelopment of the Brook Farm and Watery Lane area. In 1960, Coach Bridge was dismantled, the mill was closed, and the Bugbrooke Gasworks ceased to operate. In 1963 the Methodist Chapel was closed and its few remaining members transferred to the Baptist Chapel. In 1965 factory units were built on the site of the old brickworks. In 1960 Mary Warr, a newcomer to the village, was elected the first woman parish councillor.

In 1981, for the first and only time, Nether Heyford won the tidy village competition.

In 1986, the village gained a playing field and the boat yard at High House Wharf was reopened and extensively rebuilt on the site of the old coal yard. In 1987 the new youth club building was built, and a culvert to prevent flooding was put in place through the centre of the village. In 1990 the fishery opened. In 1991, the village hall was extended, in 1993 low-cost housing in Robert Field was built, and in 1994 a traffic calming scheme was installed.

== Newspaper ==
The village newspaper called The Prattler is published monthly and delivered to every house in the village.

== Notable former residents ==
- Simon Thomas, Blue Peter presenter.
- Anil Kumble, Indian cricket legend, lived in the village while playing for Northamptonshire CCC.
- Andy Faulkner, actor and voice artist in New Zealand, grew up in the village.

== Notable buildings ==
The local church is dedicated to St Peter and St Paul and parts are 13th century. There is a monument to Sir Walter Mauntell (died 1467) and Sir Richard Morgan (died 1556).

The Bliss Charity Primary School has about 148 pupils. It was endowed with income from lands in the will of William Bliss, a wine merchant living in Southwark, who died in 1674. William had been born and brought up in Nether Heyford, later moving to London. In his will, William left £400 to the village, £100 for a schoolhouse and £300 to buy land, the rent from which would pay for the schoolmaster and upkeep of the school.

The former rectory is Gothic and ca.1870.

The Manor House is early 18th century.

In 1799, a small group of Heyford people first met together regularly for worship in a building belonging to Mr Richard Adams, before a new special place was erected in 1826 and registered as a chapel. In 1805, a Baptist Chapel had been opened in the next village (Bugbrooke) and so Heyford people, until having their own building, would have walked or ridden on horseback to attend services there. Before this time it is known people from Heyford attended Castle Hill Chapel in Northampton.

In 1826, Baptists were able to establish a presence in Heyford, although the link with Bugbrooke remained and the minister there had charge of both chapels. By 1839 there were 76 adults in membership. There were also 24 children and therefore a Sunday school was started. The growth continued and when the Jubilee was celebrated in 1876 over 120 children assembled for a hot dinner in Bliss School. Games were organised for the children in Mr Adams' orchard at the rear of the school and later an open-air service was held on the green. In 1922, Oliver Adams was instrumental in the building of the Schoolroom. The cost was £838 whereas the chapel in 1826 had cost £178. Partly with the benefit of a legacy from A T Cosford in 1962, the Heyford Chapel was able to consider a measure of rebuilding and, in calling a part-time Minister became independent. This was the beginning of the ministry of Harry Whittaker, better known for his work as the founder director of the Northamptonshire Association of Youth Clubs. Between then and 2003 there have only been three other ministers; Frank Lawes, Michael Jones and Roy Cave.

In 1963 the Methodist Chapel, having opened in 1838, was suffering from dwindling numbers and had to close with its remaining few members transferring to the Baptist Chapel. The two stained glass windows which now grace the front of the building were also moved from the Methodist Chapel along with a number of pews and some panelling which was used to create a vestibule.

In 1984 the chapel suffered serious dry rot problems that were simultaneously affecting the parish church. This led to a number of united events, mainly involved in money-raising activities.

In the absence of a minister, the chapel has a number of visiting preachers including Mr Martin Buckby.

Standing on its own small green in the centre of the village is the War Memorial cross.

== Roman villas and post-Roman remains ==
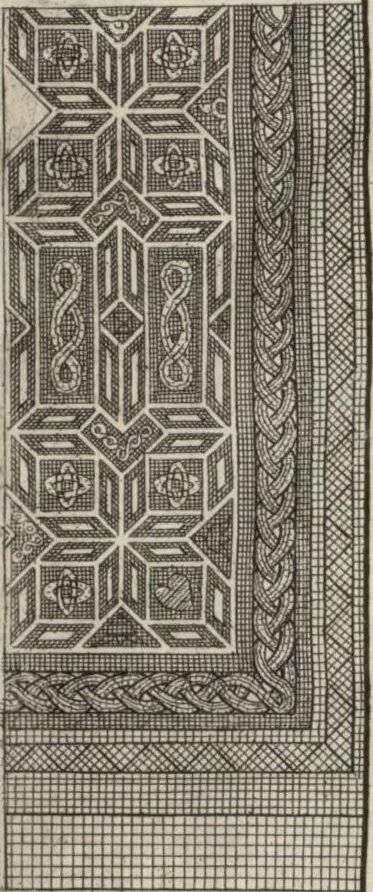
An engraving of the former Horestone mosaic (1724)

The parish is the site of two Roman villas. One was at Whitehall Farm west of the village near the A5 road which here closely follows the route of the Roman Road known as Watling Street. The villa site is on a hillside with panoramic view eastwards over the upper valley of the River Nene before it enters the town of Northampton. The whereabouts of the artefacts found there is not known.The nearest Roman towns were Lactodorum, modern name Towcester, about 8 miles (13 km) south, and Bannaventa at Whilton Lodge, near Norton about 3 miles (4.8 km) north. Excavations near the site in 2009 found a later post Roman burial ground. Burials included eight 1,400-year-old skeletons.They could have been German mercenaries hired by wealthy land owners to protect their property. Investigations are on-going.

The other site east of the village in Horestone meadow was first discovered in 1699. It had part of a fine multicolored geometric floor mosaic, plaster wall fragments, and various pieces of pottery. Once exposed, the mosaic began to disintegrate in its now damp conditions and it was removed for use in road repair in 1780. In 1821, the area was reappraised but no other important findings were made. The former building was estimated to be around 100 feet long.

The area of west Northamptonshire is rich in Romano-British archaeology with another villa site and museum at Piddington.

== Transport ==
Bus services in Nether Heyford are provided by Stagecoach Midlands. The nearest station is Northampton.

The West Coast Main Line passes to the south and west of the village. Until its closure in 1958, Weedon was the nearest station. The line runs through Stowe Hill tunnel under the A5, to the west.
