= Stowe, Northamptonshire =

Stowe, Northamptonshire could refer to the following places in England:

- Stowe Nine Churches, a civil parish containing:
  - Church Stowe, a settlement in that parish,
  - Upper Stowe, a settlement in that parish
