= Piddington Roman Villa =

Piddington Roman villa
- Location within Northamptonshire

General information
- Type: Roman villa
- Location: Hackleton, Northamptonshire
- Coordinates: 52.184°N 0.824°W
- Map Ref: SP802545

Piddington Roman Villa is the remains of a large Roman villa at Piddington, Northamptonshire, about 6 miles (9.7 km) south-east of Northampton, a county in the East Midlands of England.

== Location ==
The villa is on the site of an earlier late Iron Age settlement. The museum is housed in an old de-consecrated Wesleyan chapel built in 1851, located in Chapel End on the north-eastern edge of the village.

== History ==
=== Iron Age ===
Excavation by the Upper Nene Archaeological Society since 1979 provides evidence that the area close to Piddington has been occupied for ca.10,000 years. Neolithic, ca.3500–1500 BC, and Bronze Age people, ca.1500–600 BC, left behind flint tools and arrowheads which they used for hunting. No houses survived, however. A late Iron Age settlement originated around the middle of the 1st century BC where people lived in round houses inside an enclosure with an outer ditch for protection. They were skilled at pottery and making bronze objects and traded with continental Europe. After the Roman invasion of Britain in 43 AD, there was a military presence here and the Roman villa followed later that century, first made of wood, then stone, developing into a great house over the next 250 years.

=== Roman ===
The site was occupied from about 50 BC, with circular buildings followed by a proto-villa of ca.70 AD and then a sequence of rectangular stone-built structures, culminating in a simple cottage type villa. From the 2nd century this became an increasingly large winged-corridor-type villa with courtyard (indeed, a 2nd-century well on the site is probably the largest stone-lined well in Roman Britain and has produced a wealth of environmental and other evidence). It also had two bath-houses, possibly one used by the estate workers and one, smaller one for the villa owners at one end of the main range of villa buildings.

=== Roman owners ===
The names of two probable 2nd-century AD owners had their names stamped on some of the villa tiles. They were Tiberivs Clavdivs Vervs (Tiberius Claudius Verus) and Tiberiv Clavdivs Severvs (Tiberius Claudius Severus), presumably related. Their names suggest they were Roman citizens, but are thought most likely to have been native Britons. The villa was at its largest and grandest at this time. This is clear from objects found on the villa site which came from all over the Roman Empire. Today, Piddington may be a backwater, but at the time it was part of a thriving economy with wide-ranging trading partners.

=== Post-Roman ===
At the end of the 3rd century, earlier than most other Romano-British villas, it apparently became abruptly unoccupied and much of it was deliberately dismantled, with "squatter"-type 'family-unit' occupation taking over from the beginning of the 4th century until at least until its end. There is also evidence for early Anglo Saxon activity, including at least three burials and a possible dwelling. The church, probably of Anglo-Saxon origin is, not surprisingly, close to the villa site.

== Excavation ==
The site was rediscovered by workmen digging for limestone in 1781. A complete mosaic was unearthed, but people from Northampton came and took it away as "souvenirs". Trial excavation started in 1959. Since then, excavation on the site has been conducted by the Upper Nene Archaeological Society, part-time, since 1979. It is a long-term rescue excavation, since parts of the site are close to the surface and thus plough-damaged. Currently this has been minimised with the local farmer's co-operation.

== Site museum ==
On 4 September 2004, Tony Robinson, of Channel 4's Time Team officially opened Piddington Villa Museum. The Upper Nene Archaeological Society, known as "UNAS", originally bought the redundant, and de-consecrated, Wesleyan Chapel in 1992. The intervening period involved restoration, conversion and fund raising. This work was finally rewarded with a substantial grant from the Heritage Lottery Fund. The museum now displays some of the many finds made during the long-running excavation of the Piddington Villa over 25 years, and still on-going. Apart from the displays, the building houses stores for the many found objects. There are also displays of how it may have been to be alive in Roman Britain. It also has a library and study room.

The museum is popular with local history study groups and local schools learning about early British history. Apart from significant archaeological material it houses displays interpreting 500 years of life at the settlement, including: a detailed model of the villa, as in the later 2nd century; a full-sized mannequin of a possible owner of the villa called Tiberius Claudius Severus, with an audio presentation; a full-scale reconstruction of sections of a typical roof and hypocaust, the Roman heating system.

In 2006, the museum and excavations won the Council for British Archaeology's "Mick Aston Award" for the best presentation of an archaeological project or theme to the public.

== See also ==
- Bannaventa Roman town near Norton, Northamptonshire
- Borough Hill Roman villa near Daventry
- Cosgrove Roman villa and bath house
- Nether Heyford, site of two Roman villas
