= Wassermann radar =

German early-warning radar built in World War 2

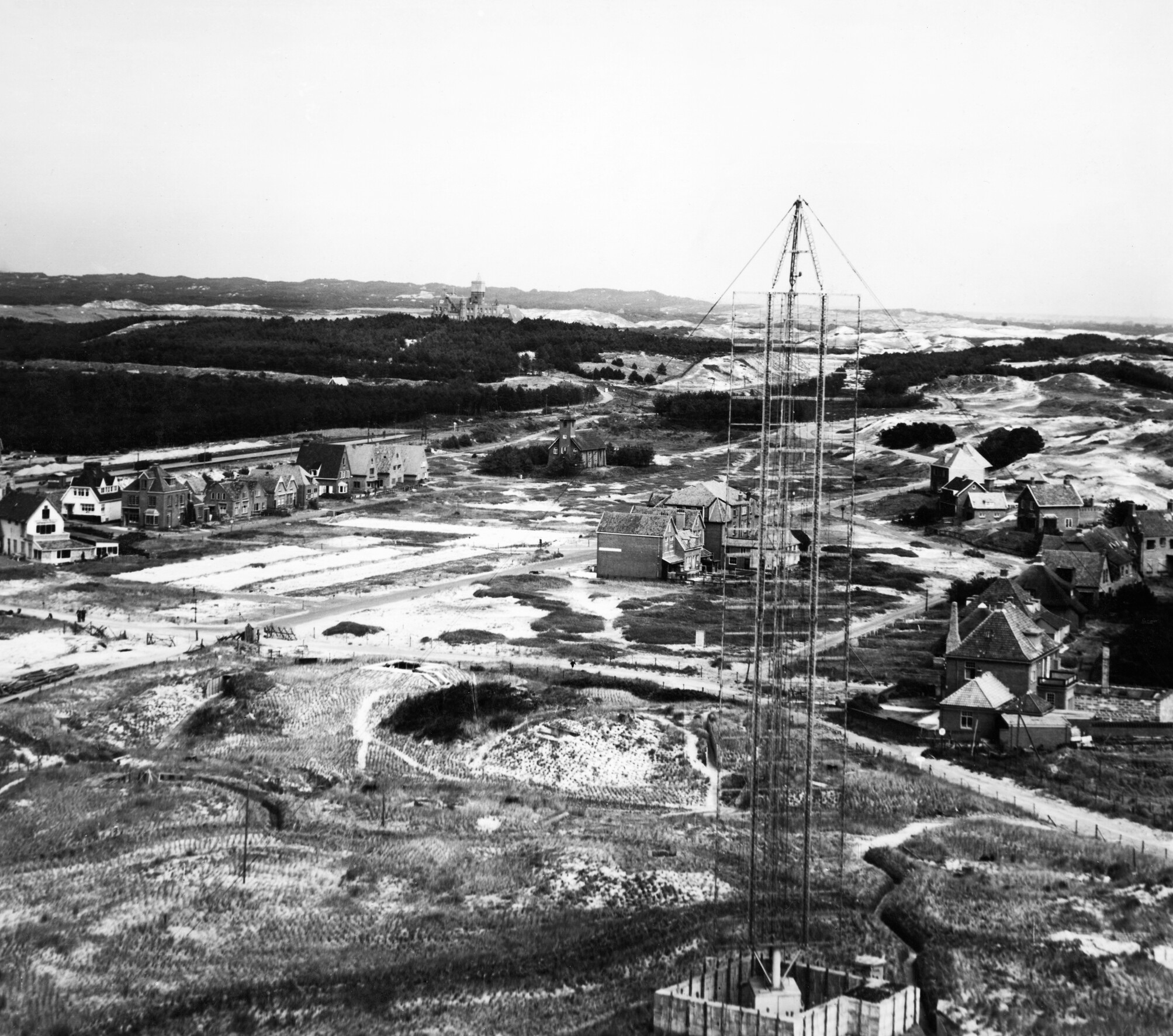
- Aerial view of Wassermann radar installation at Bergen aan Zee, 1943
- Country of origin: Germany
- Introduced: 1942?
- Type: Early-warning radar
- Frequency: 120–150 MHz
- Pulsewidth: 2–3 μs
- Range: 300 km (190 mi)
- Azimuth: 360°
- Precision: ±1,000 feet (300 m)
- Power: 100 kW

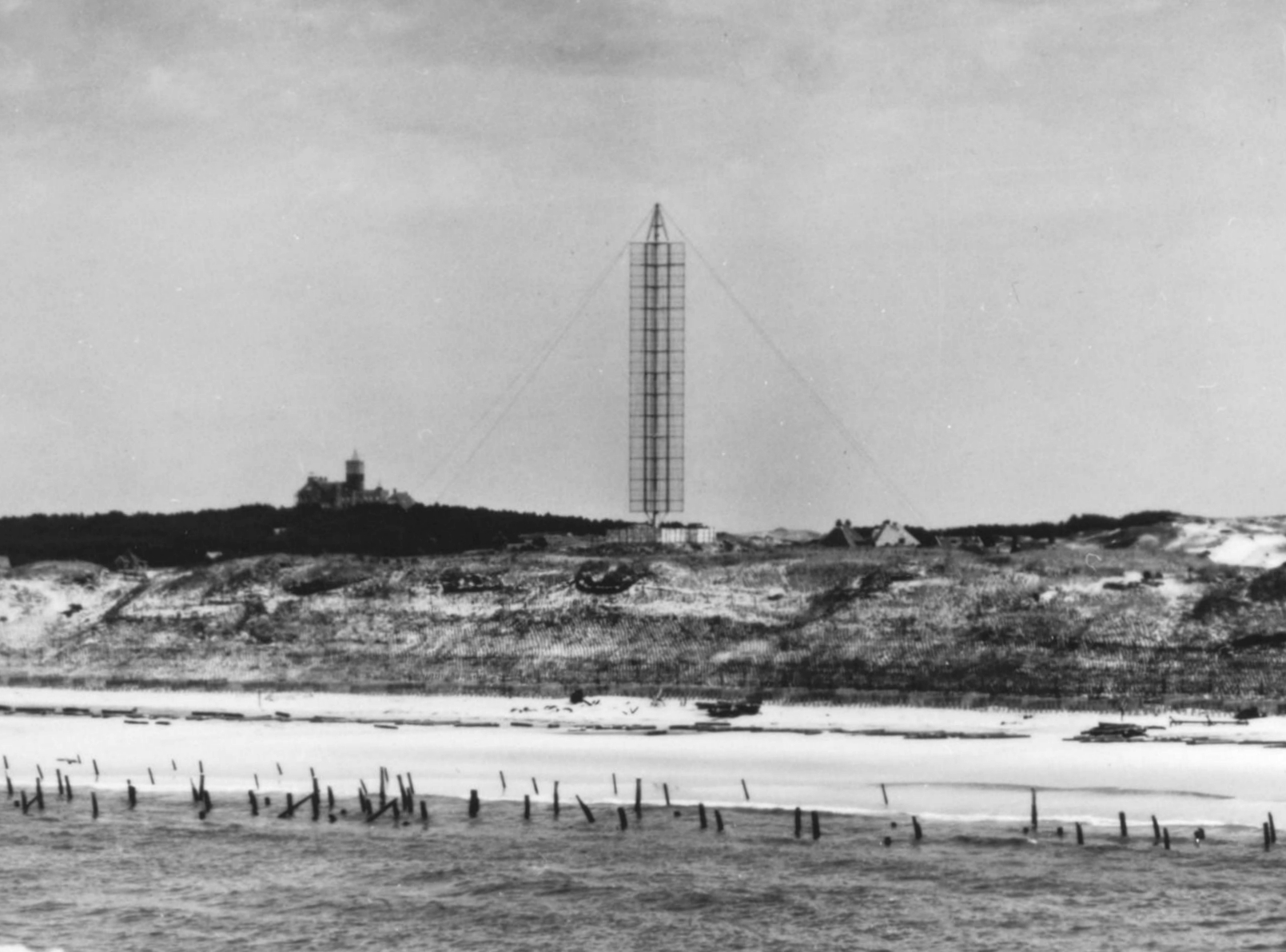
Sea-level view of the Wasserman radar in Bergen aan Zee

The Wasserman radar was an early-warning radar built by Germany during World War II. The radar was a development of FuMG 80 Freya and was operated during World War II for long range detection. It was developed under the direction of Theodor Schultes, beginning in 1942. Wasserman was based on largely unchanged Freya electronics, but used a new antenna array in order to improve range, height-finding and bearing precision.

== Development ==
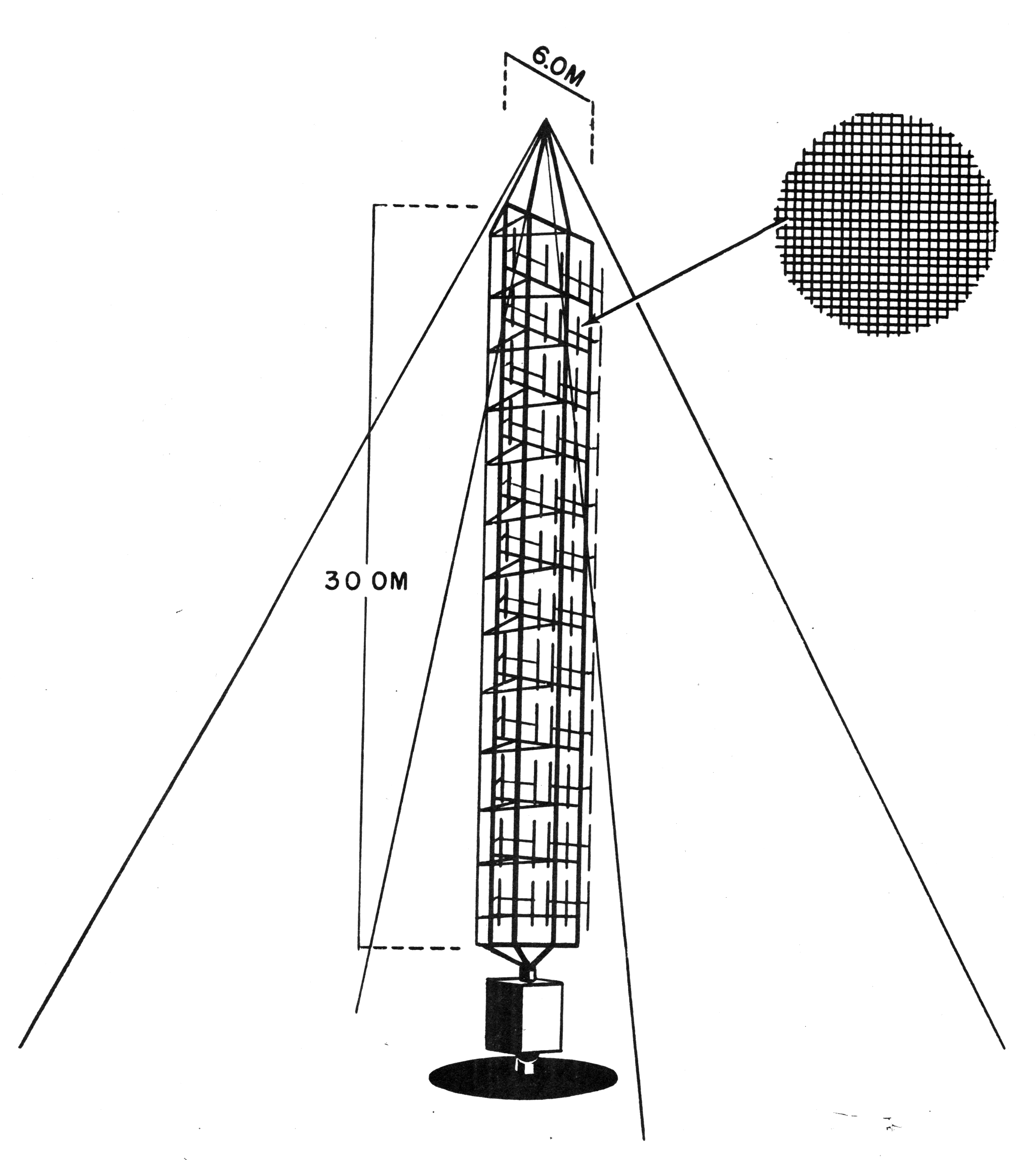
Wassermann L with steel lattice mast

Seven versions were developed. The two most important versions are:

- The radio measurement equipment FuMG.41 Wassermann L (German: Leicht = light) was a constellation of four Freya antennas on top of each other, mounted on a 40-metre-high (130 ft) rotatable steel lattice mast.
- A later version was the FuMG.42 Wassermann S (German: Schwer = heavy). For this eight Freya antenna arrays were mounted on a 60-metre-high (200 ft) pipe mast in two columns, each four antennae high.

The combination of the antennae in this way resulted in a concentration of the radiated energy to a smaller beam, thus resulting in a higher radiated power in the main direction (Effective Radiated Power = ERP) without increasing the transmitter power. The result was a longer range. With the L-version the horizontal opening angle of the antenna array remained the same but the vertical opening angle was reduced (so flatter radiation pattern). Because the horizontal opening angle was not changed, the bearing measuring performance was not changed. With the S-version also the horizontal opening angle was reduced, resulting in a better bearing resolution.

== Technical Info ==
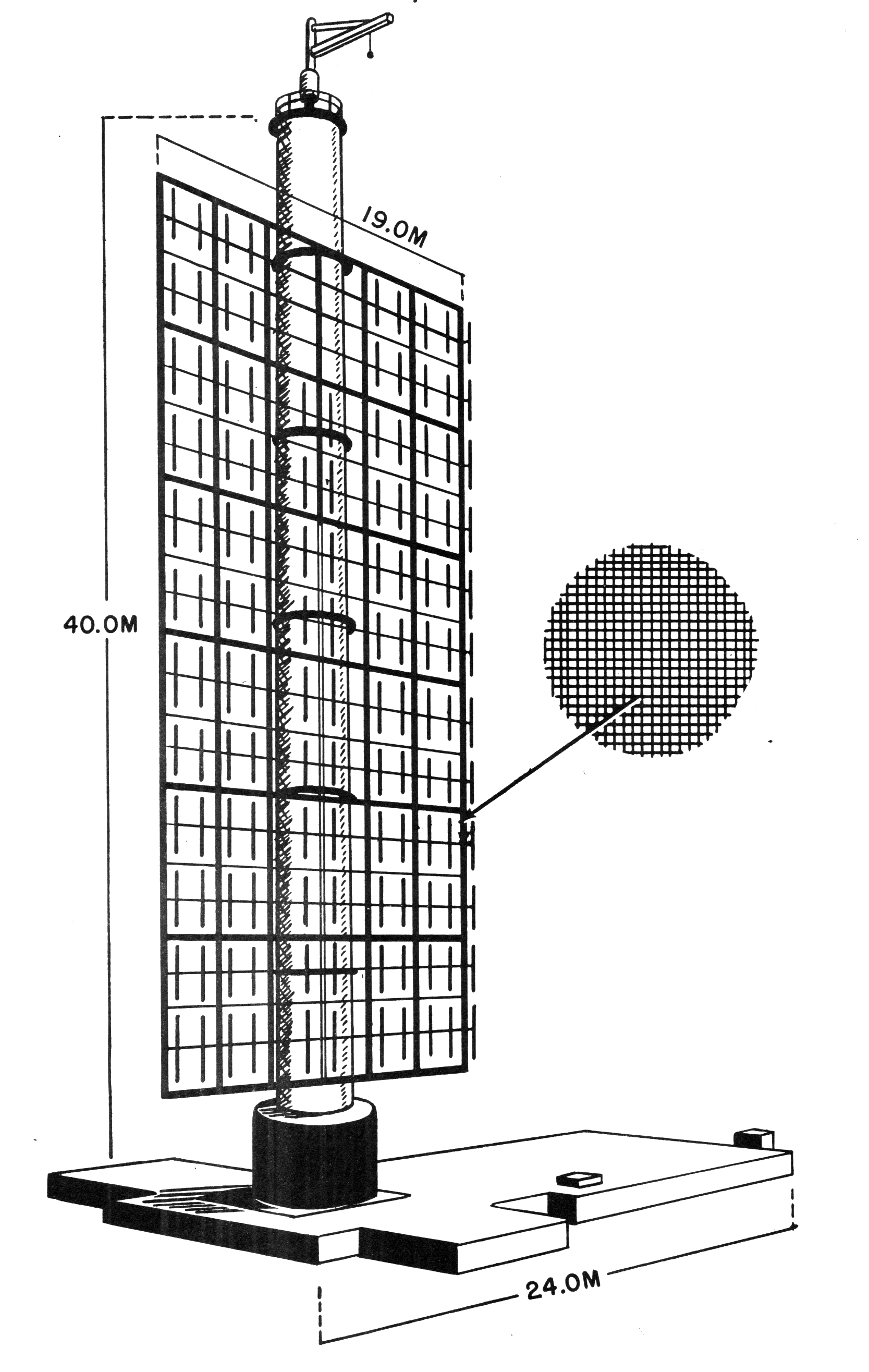
Wassermann S with pipe mast

- Search bearing: mechanical rotation of 360°
- Range: depending on target altitude and station altitude, e.g.:

Target altitude Range
50 m 35 km
6,000 m 190 km

- Range accuracy: +/−300 m
- Detection accuracy:

• Bearing: +/−1/4°
• Altitude: +/−3/4° (in the range of 3–18°)
• Altitude detection possible

- Detection possibly up to 12,000 m
- Mass: 30–60 t
- Seize: Height of mast: 37–57 m
- Width 6–12, 40 m
- Jamming resisted due to three different frequency ranges:

• 1.9–2.5 m
• 1.2–1.9 m
• 2.4–4.0 m

- Detection of Friend or Foe in cooperation with the FuG.25a Erstling equipment.

== Bibliography ==
- Swords, Sean S . (1986). Technical History of the Beginnings of Radar. London: IEE/Peter Peregrinus. ISBN 0-86341-043-X.
