= Stowe Nine Churches =

Civil parish in Northamptonshire, England

Coordinates: 52.21°N 1.06°W

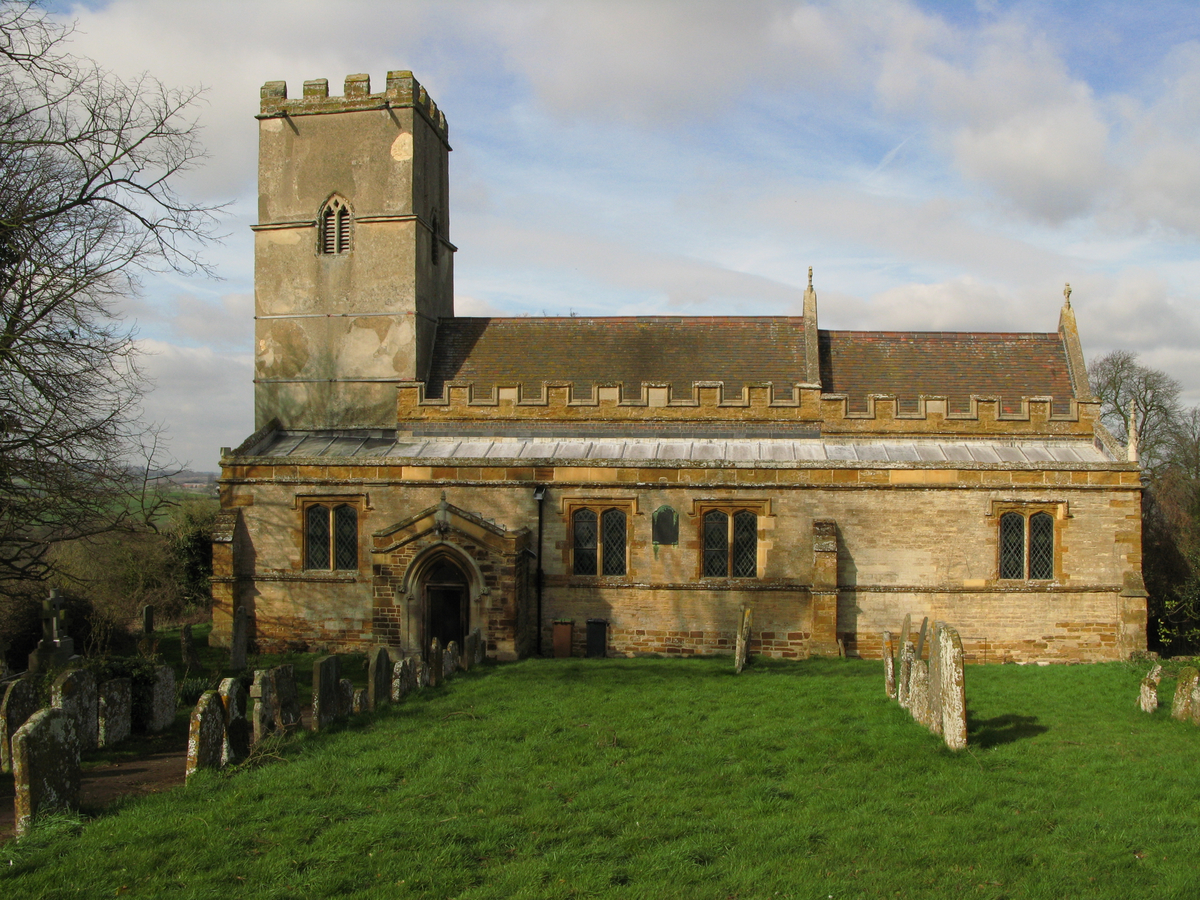
- Church Stowe

- Location within Northamptonshire
- Population: 259 (2011 census)
- Civil parish: Stowe IX Churches
- Unitary authority: West Northamptonshire
- Ceremonial county: Northamptonshire
- Region: East Midlands
- Country: England
- Sovereign state: United Kingdom
- Police: Northamptonshire
- Fire: Northamptonshire
- Ambulance: East Midlands

Stowe Nine Churches, also written as Stowe IX Churches, is a civil parish incorporating the settlements of Church Stowe and Upper Stowe in the West Northamptonshire district, in the ceremonial county of Northamptonshire, England. The population of the parish at the 2011 census was 259.

== Name ==
'Stowe' is a common English place-name.This was distinguished from others of the same name by the addition of the descriptor 'Nine Churches'. In former times the lord of the manor had within his gift the appointment of the rectors of nine different churches.

According to legend, the name derives from an incident involving St Michael's Church in Church Stowe. The site of the church was reputedly chosen by a supernatural spirit, who moved the building materials to a different location overnight for nine consecutive nights, so the builders eventually built the church in that location.

== Geography ==
From 1974 to 2021 it was in Daventry district, it is often referred to as Stowe IX Churches.

Population from 2001 census is 248.

== History ==
=== Quarrying ===
By 1853 a limestone quarry had been established to the south of the road from Church Stowe to what is now the A5. It was linked by a horse worked tramway which led under the main railway to the canal between Nether Heyford and Weedon. The stone was taken away from there by canal boat. By 1855 the tramway had been extended south westward up the hill to a new iron ore quarry at a place now called Lodge Plantation. This is on the south side of the road from Upper Stowe to Farthingstone just to the west of where the road from Church Stowe joins it. That area is now wooded. The ore was taken to the Heyford ironworks by canal. However iron ore quarrying ceased from 1857 to 1863.

After the resumption of the iron ore quarry, part of the incline above the limestone quarry was worked by cable. Above that it was probably horse worked, below by steam locomotive, but in 1869 the tramway was converted from a narrow gauge to standard gauge and the line was diverted from west of the railway bridge south eastward to sidings on the west side of the railway just to the north of the Nether Heyford to Litchborough road. Thus the canal wharf was no longer used. Steam locomotives were now used on both upper and lower sections.

The ironstone quarry ceased operation in 1877 but the limestone quarry continued until 1900, the stone being taken on the tramway to limekilns next to the railway at Nether Heyford. It was re-opened much later both for burning lime at new kilns next to the quarry and for obtaining building stone. The stone was taken away by road vehicles. Eleven and a half tons of Church Stowe limestone are said to have been used in repair work at Castle Ashby Church and House in 1982. The limestone quarry is now disused but can be seen. Parts of the tramway embankment can still be seen between the A5 and the railway. A footpath parallels or uses part of its route.

=== Experimental evidence for the principles of radar ===
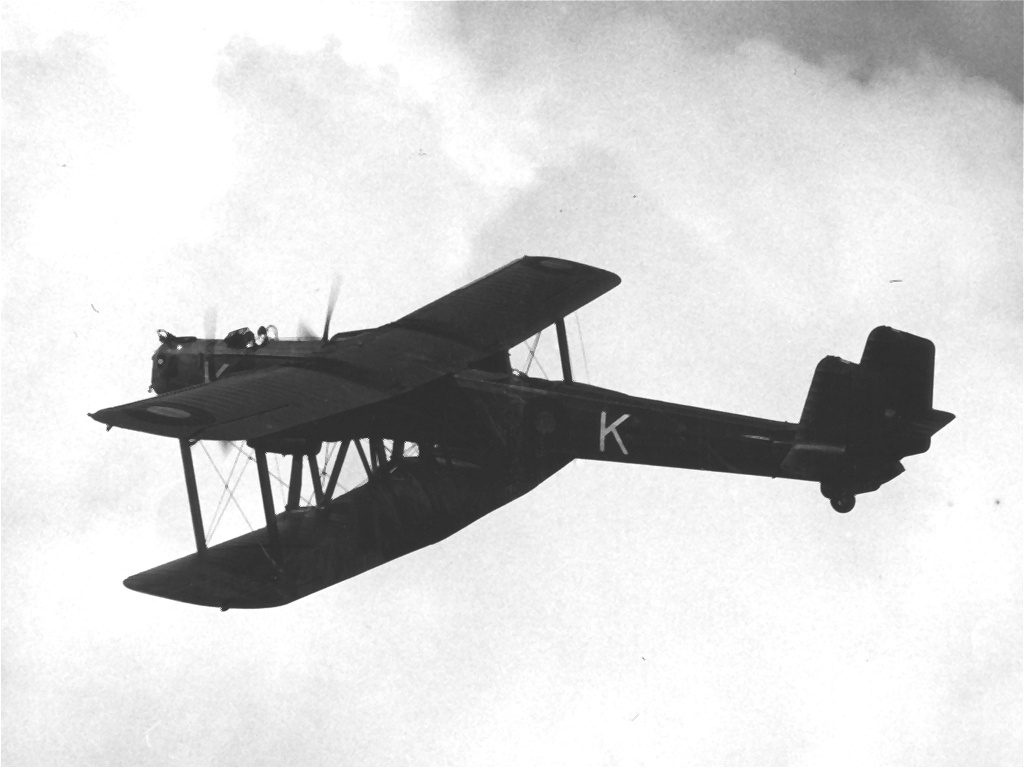
Heyford RAF bomber

Military interest in radar began in November 1934. It was in Upper Stowe, about three miles south of Weedon Bec, that the principles of radar were first found to be a practical possibility, and not just a theoretical proposal. On the evening of 25 February 1935, radio wave detection equipment, including an oscilloscope, was brought from the National Physical Laboratory (via the A5) in an old ambulance to a field close to the village. The field was just off the road (Welsh Lane - former B4525) between Litchborough and Bugbrooke, about 400 metres from the A5 and close to the Daventry district and South Northamptonshire boundary..

Arnold Frederic Wilkins OBE and an assistant prepared the equipment, which was to listen-in for any extraneous radio waves (interference) on the BBC's wavelength of 49 metres as a plane flew overhead. In the early morning (Tuesday 26 February), the Handley Page Heyford (a biplane) K6902 took off from RAE Farnborough and climbed to 6,000 ft, being piloted by Flt Lt Robert Blucke (1897-1988). The Heyford was probably the largest aircraft the RAF had at the time. The radio signals to be tested came from the Marconi/BBC transmitter at Borough Hill two miles to the north-west.

Principles of radar

The oscilloscope detected that there was disturbance in the amount of electromagnetic energy being received on the BBC's wavelength when the plane flew overhead, and thus radio waves could detect the presence of aircraft, and the approximate navigational position. The aircraft's position was tracked up to a distance of eight miles.

Information on the experiment, and of radar, was publicly first released in June 1941. Radar was also developed with Sir Frank Edward Smith.

The first description of the experiment was given on Thursday 18 March 1943 on BBC Radio by Mr Watson Watt. Robert Watson-Watt was the son of a joiner. He died in Inverness in 1973.

The pilot, Bobby Blucke, would later become Air Vice-Marshal Blucke CB CBE. He was in charge of Blind Approach Training in 1939 and commanded No. 1 Group RAF in 1945. He died on 2 October 1988.

The Americans had also noticed similar effects with radio waves. In June 1930 Lawrence A. Hyland (1897-1989) had noticed reflected waves. In the 1920s Gregory Breit and Merle Tuve pulsed radio broadcasts, which is largely how radar works. In December 1934 Robert Morris Page developed a pulsed system, but did not discover much.

The Germans in 1934 were first led by Rudolf Kühnhold, followed by Hans Hollmann and Theodor Schultes.

The Russians had Abram Ioffe, Pavel Oshchepkov and Yuri Konstantinovich Korovin (1907–88).

The stone was unveiled in September 2001, after campaigning by a RAF engineer.
