= Muscott (lost settlement) =

Deserted village of Muscott
- Lost Settlement
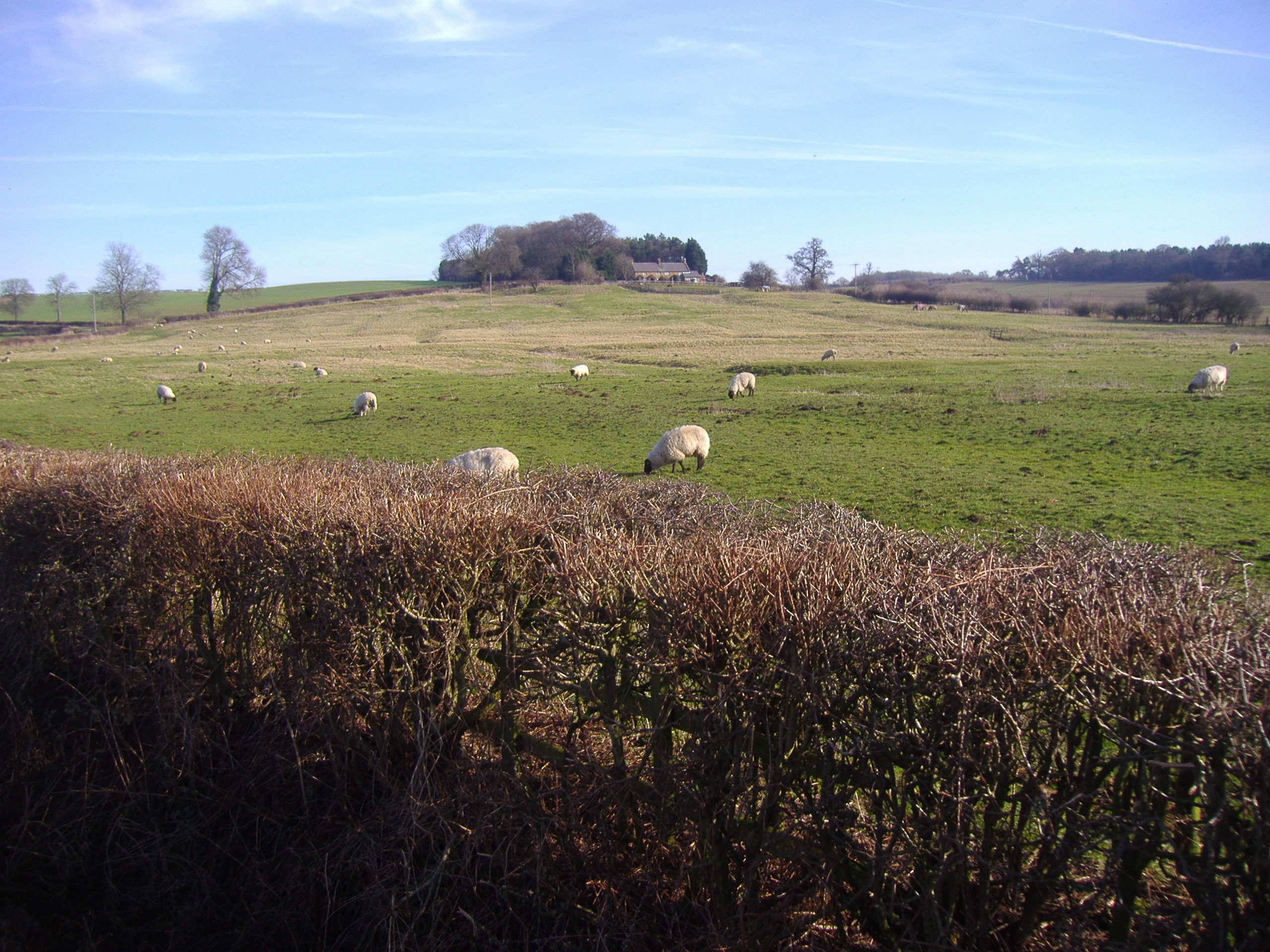
- The site of the deserted village of Muscott

- Muscott within Northamptonshire
- Coordinates: 52°15′50″N 1°5′10″W
- Country: England
- State: Northamptonshire
- Region: East Midlands
- District: Daventry
- Municipality: Norton
- Map Ref: SP627633

The lost village of Muscott is a deserted medieval village and scheduled monument located within the parish of Norton in the English county of Northamptonshire. The village was depoplulated beginning in the 14th century, likely as a result of the Black Death in England. Muscott is now a hamlet.

== History ==
Muscott is mentioned in the 1068 Domesday Book together with the nearby town of Brockhall. Following the Black Death in 1348, the village's population drastically declined, leaving it with only a few inhabitants. In the 16th century, the manor house and its lands were bought by the Spencer family and used for sheep pasture. The site of the former village has been a scheduled monument since 1958 due to its well-preserved medieval earthworks.

== Gallery ==
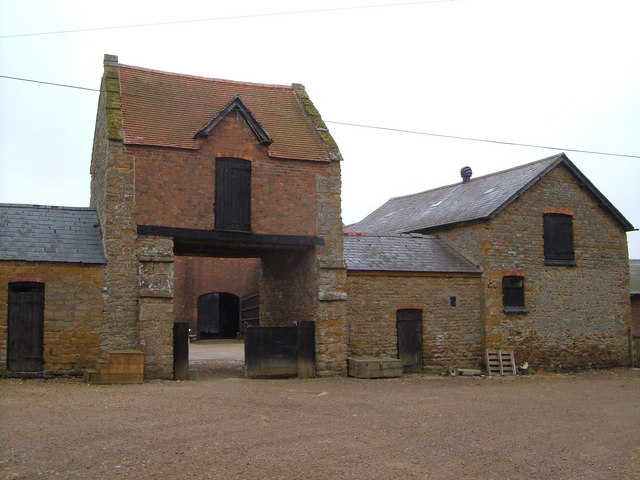
Medieval gatehouse, Muscott
