= Muscott =

Hamlet in Northamptonshire, England

Coordinates: 52.2600°N 1.1025°W

- Location within Northamptonshire
- OS grid reference: SP613628
- Unitary authority: West Northamptonshire
- Ceremonial county: Northamptonshire
- Region: East Midlands
- Country: England
- Sovereign state: United Kingdom
- Post town: Northampton
- Postcode district: NN7
- Dialling code: 01327
- Police: Northamptonshire
- Fire: Northamptonshire
- Ambulance: East Midlands
- UK Parliament: Daventry

Muscott is a hamlet in Norton civil parish in the south of the English county of Northamptonshire.

== See also ==
- Muscott (lost settlement)
