= Bannaventa =

Bannaventa Benaventa
- Settlement
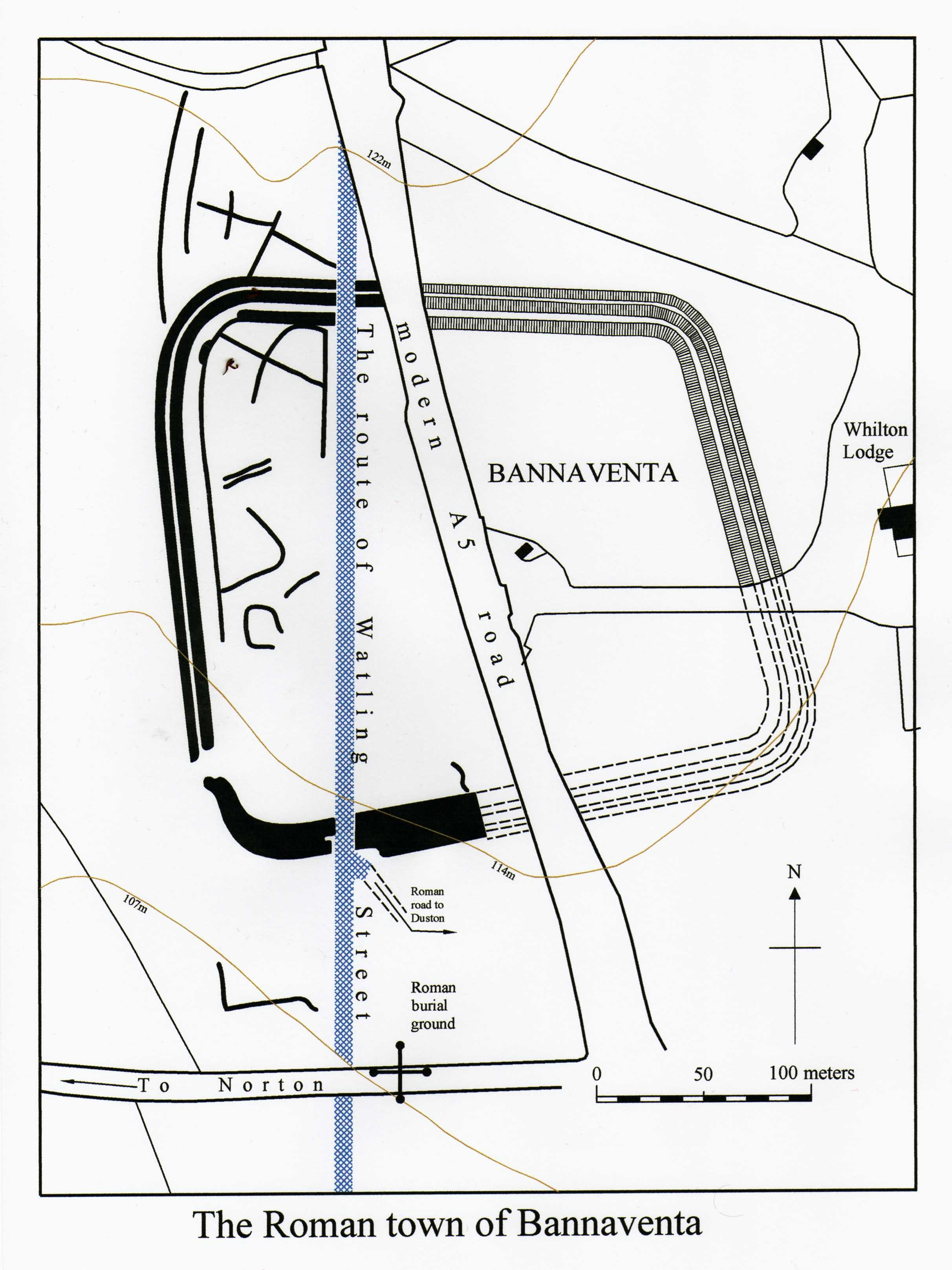
- Plan of the site of Bannaventa
- Etymology: Celtic: hillfield
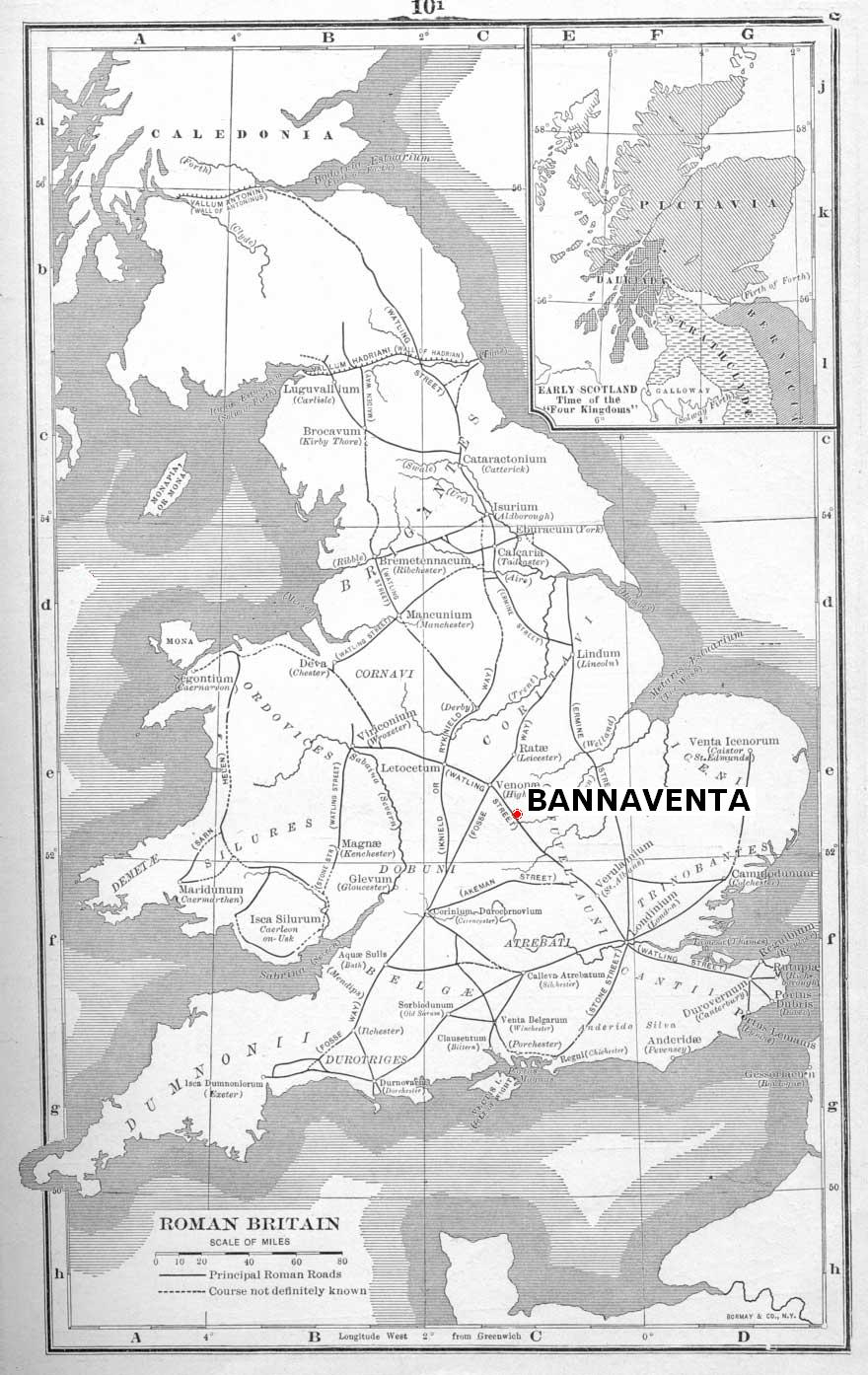

- Position in the county, which now has two not seven smaller divisions.
- Coordinates: 52.2753°N 1.1022°W
- Country: England
- County: Northamptonshire
- District: West Northamptonshire
- Civil Parishes: Norton & Whilton
- Established: Likely: 1st century CE, well-attested existence in certain accounts of Britain in the 2nd century.
- Elevation: 120 m (390 ft)
- Postal code: NN11 2NA
- The focal Ordnance Survey grid reference is SP612645.

Bannaventa or Benaventa was a Romano-British fortified town which was situated on the Roman road later called Watling Street. In the modern day, the location is on the A5 road. Bannaventa straddles the boundaries of Norton and Whilton, Northamptonshire, England.

== Iter II (Watling Street) ==
Watling Street north of St Albans. The map shows the Roman towns established along Watling Street by the end of the first century AD.

The road on which Bannaventa lies is thought to be the first built by the Romans in Britain. It begins in Portus Ritupis (Richborough in Kent) and runs in successive north westerly directions – via many Roman towns. (Note: Notably at Viroconium (now Wroxeter in Shropshire), it bifurcated (split in two): one limb went to Deva Victrix (now Chester) and the other towards Aberystwyth with a link to Caerleon.)

Bannaventa was a small fortified town on this road 10.9 miles (17.5 km) north-northwest of the Roman town of Lactodorum (now Towcester). The other way, by 17.3 miles (27.8 km), was the Roman settlement of Venonis (Wigston Parva), a crossroads town – of this street which there for several miles marks the Leicestershire-Warwickshire boundary – with Fosse Way (road from Lincoln to Britain's south west).

== Name ==
Bannaventa is derived from Brittonic *bannā "peak, hill" (as in Modern Welsh ban, "top, tip, point, summit, crest, peak, beacon, height, pinnacle, turret, hill, mountain, bare hill") and *wentā, of obscure origin, but perhaps "place of sacrifice" or simply "place, field" (as in Welsh cadwent "battlefield")

Brief mention of the settlement is thrice found in Emperor Antoninus Pius’s Itinerarium, Iter Britanniarum (The Road Routes of Antoninus Augustus):

- Iter 2, Venone XII, Benaventa XVII, Lactodorum XII.
- Iter 6, Lactodorum XVI, Isannavantia XII, Tripontium XII.
- Iter 8, Venone XII, Benaventa XVIII, Magiovinter XXVIII.

The sites of these names are as follows:

- Venone = High Cross, Wigston Parva, Leicestershire
- Lactodorum = Towcester, Northamptonshire
- Isannavantia = Bannaventa – assumed.
- Tripontium = Cave's Inn, Warwickshire
- Magiovinter = Dropshort, Buckinghamshire

This emperor died in 161 AD.

== Description ==
Map of the small Roman town of Bannaventa straddling the Watling Street Roman Road at a junction with a road to Duston. A larger first-century enclosure surrounds a possible late 3rd century walled enclosure. No above ground remains can be seen and Watling Street now makes a minor diversion from its Roman course. The canal, railway and motorway to the east have removed the evidence of the course of the Duston road.

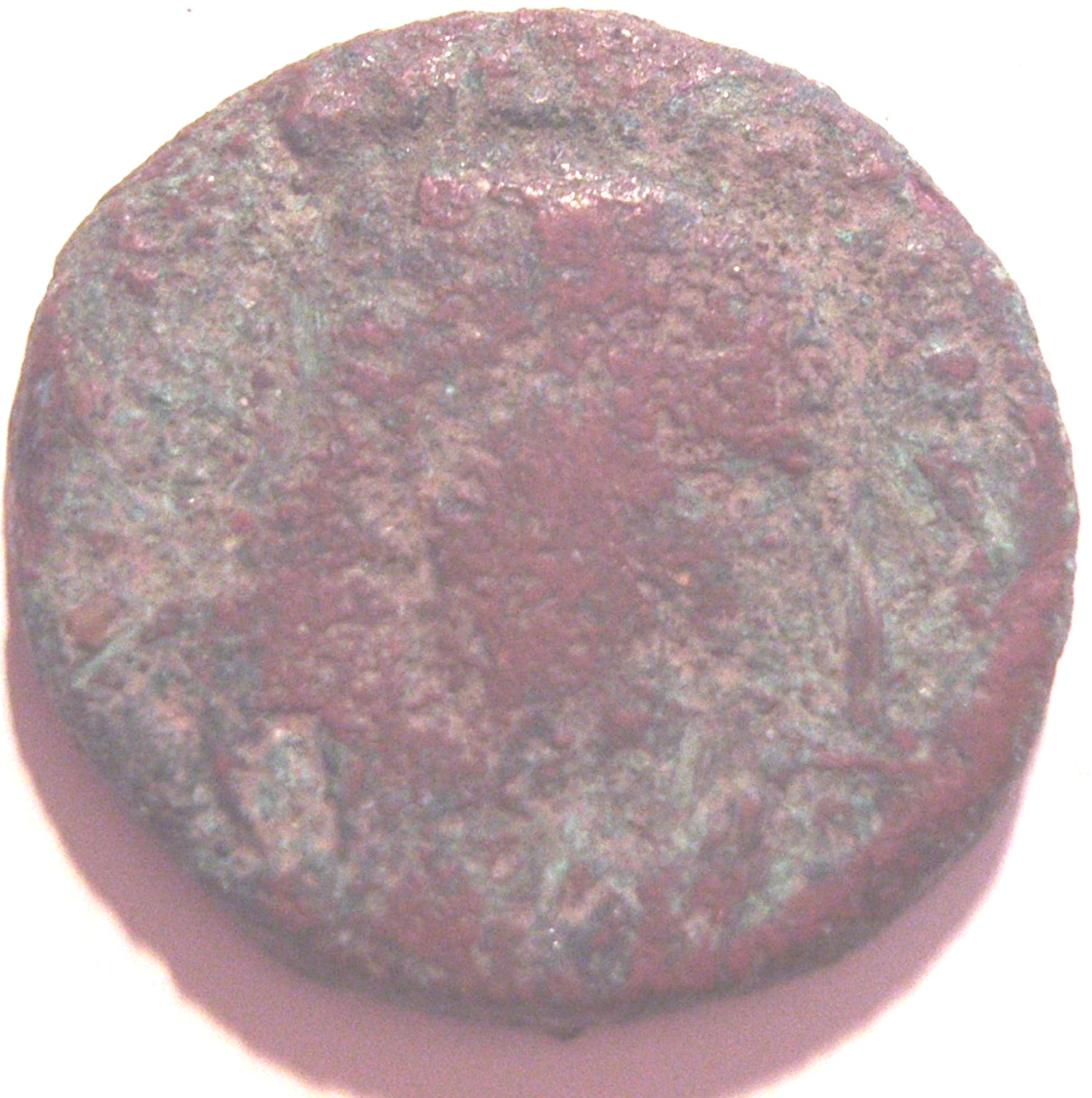
A coin discovered at the site

Bannaventa was a staging post for Romano-Celtic travellers and would have operated along the lines of the coaching towns of a later period along Watling Street. The town would have been a vital part of the road infrastructure of Roman Britain. The fortified town would provide a safe, warm resting place where provisions for the journey could be bought and horses and other livestock could be safely stabled overnight. A possible location for a Mansio (an Imperial hostel) or mutatio (a more basic staging post) was identified in a 2016 survey. The town would also provide some protection for the wider local allies in times of danger, and it would appear that in the late third century a smaller, more defensible area was enclosed within the south-west section of the town. Close to the town are other Roman sites, connected in time. These include the remains of a villa on the summit of nearby Borough Hill, another smaller settlement between Thrupp Lodge and Thrupp Grounds (Note: at grid reference SP 599651) and two other small homesteads, (Note: SP613638, SP608649) and a more western Roman villa (Note: at SP605649).

=== Rediscovery ===
It was not until the early 18th century that the site of Bannaventa was positively identified. Previously, sites at nearby Weedon Bec, Daventry's Borough Hill and even Northampton had been suggested. There have been many archaeological finds across the site including the discovery of a skeleton and numerous cremations in a Roman burial ground a little south of the boundary of the fortifications. Other discoveries include Constantinian coins, some foundations, stonework, and pottery; most were found in the early 18th century and they led to the definitive location of the town. More finds in the 20th century have been discovered and are listed below:

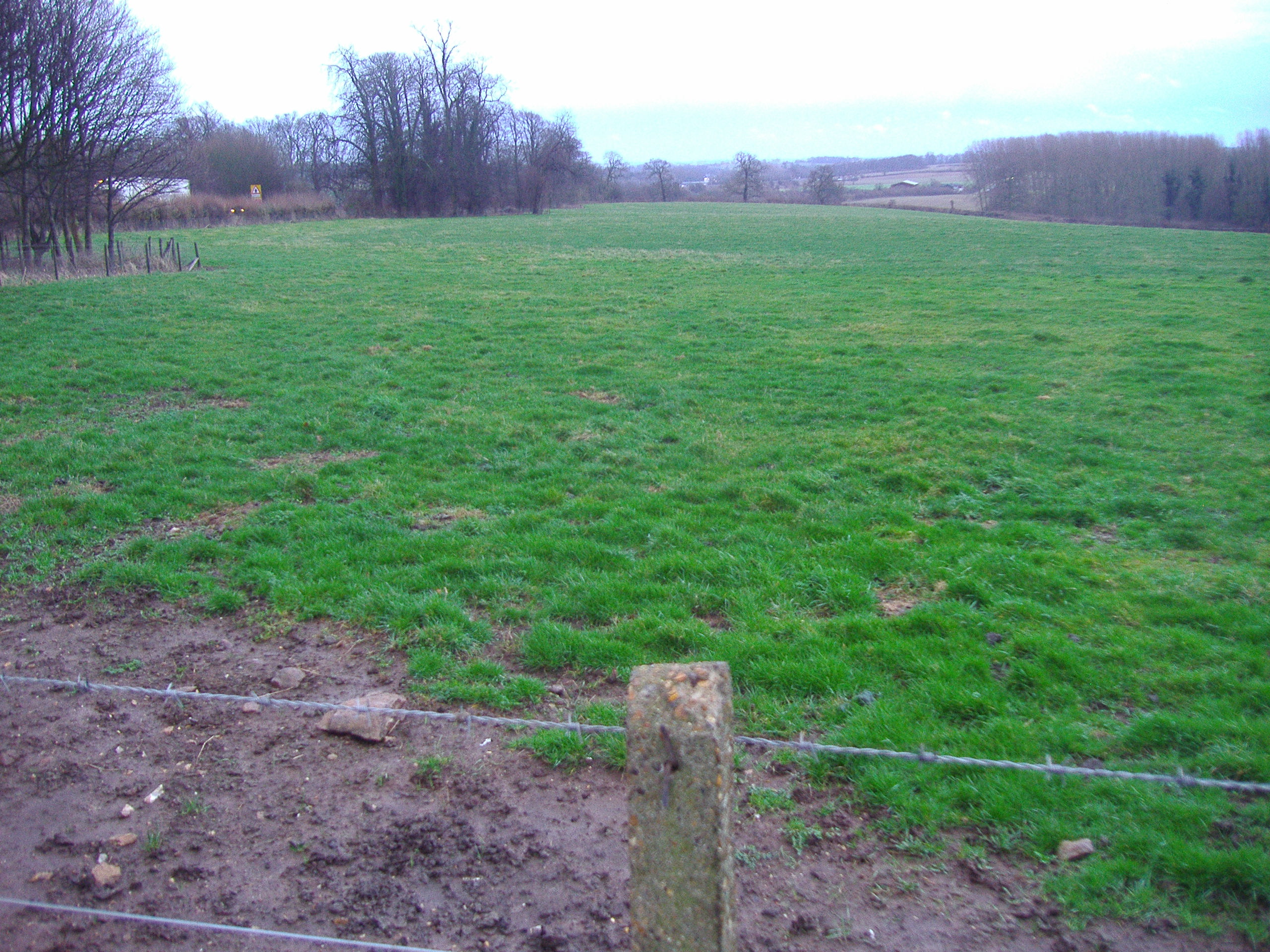
View south from the northwest corner of Bannaventa

- A number of rubbish pits dating from the 1st and 2nd century
- In 1900, Roman coins of Victorinus and Samian ware, remnants of buildings including wall plaster, rotten wood, roof slates, and a cobbled floor.
- In 1922 Roman coins including a Sestertius of Hadrian.
- In 1957 a Large Nene Valley beaker, large painted pot, part of a glass bowl. Fragments of a black Samian pot plus many other artifacts.

In 1970 the site was photographed from the air. This revealed the position of the street which was more true north-south as it bisected the town, and the outline of the town mostly to the west of the A5. The settlement was enclosed by an imperfect square (distended to the south-east) with broad rounded corners, bounded by a series of three sets of banks and ditches. The enclosed town measured 13.5 acres (5.5 ha). In the enclosure lies evidence of the wooden buildings which made up most of the town.

During 2016 and 2017, a community archaeological survey project, led by Stephen Young and Fred Kay, conducted a geophysical survey of areas around the Roman site. This revealed that the outermost of the three banks only followed the inner ones on two sides. On the north and east it extended well beyond the inner enclosure, to create a significantly larger town boundary, enclosing some 11 hectares (27 acres). The previously identified walls occupied the south-western section, and were imposed at a later date. The archaeologists suggested that the outer banks are the earlier town boundary, probably dating to the end of the first century, to perform a dual role of introducing Roman town life to the area, and providing the hospitality and logistics needs of the empire's communication network. The smaller walled area was built in the late 3rd century AD, to make a more defensible 'Posting Station', for both local taxation and Watling Street postal purposes. This perhaps reflected a period of unrest and a need for greater protection. The survey also revealed evidence of a suburb a little to the south of the walled town, suggestive of a prosperous and unprotected habitation, and a reminder that contradictory trends can be found in close proximity. Additional information on some of the internal roads was also gained, indicating that it has no military-style grid pattern, and thus may have always been a civilian establishment.

=== Current status ===
Nothing obviously Roman now remains above ground and has no public access, and is privately owned and is a field. It is a Scheduled Ancient Monument.

== Similarity to name of Saint Patrick's birthplace ==
Saint Patrick, patron saint of Ireland, tells us in his Confession that he had been born in a settlement called Bannavem Taburniae. The location is unknown, but could be a variant of Bannaventa. This led at least one historian of this county to opine that Patrick was born at Bannaventa.

However an early Life of Patrick describes his birthplace as "near the western sea", easing the rest of Patrick's confession that he was carried into slavery in Ireland by Irish raiders. Likewise, per co-authors of a scholarly national typography of 1979, the suffix "Taburniae" is likely to distinguish it from Bannaventa. An alternative contender is the village of Banwen, in South Wales, where an annual procession is held to mark the possibility.

== Footnotes and references ==
=== References ===
- Tripontium, by Jack Lucas FSA (1997) ISBN 0-9531265-0-1
