= Borough Hill Roman villa =

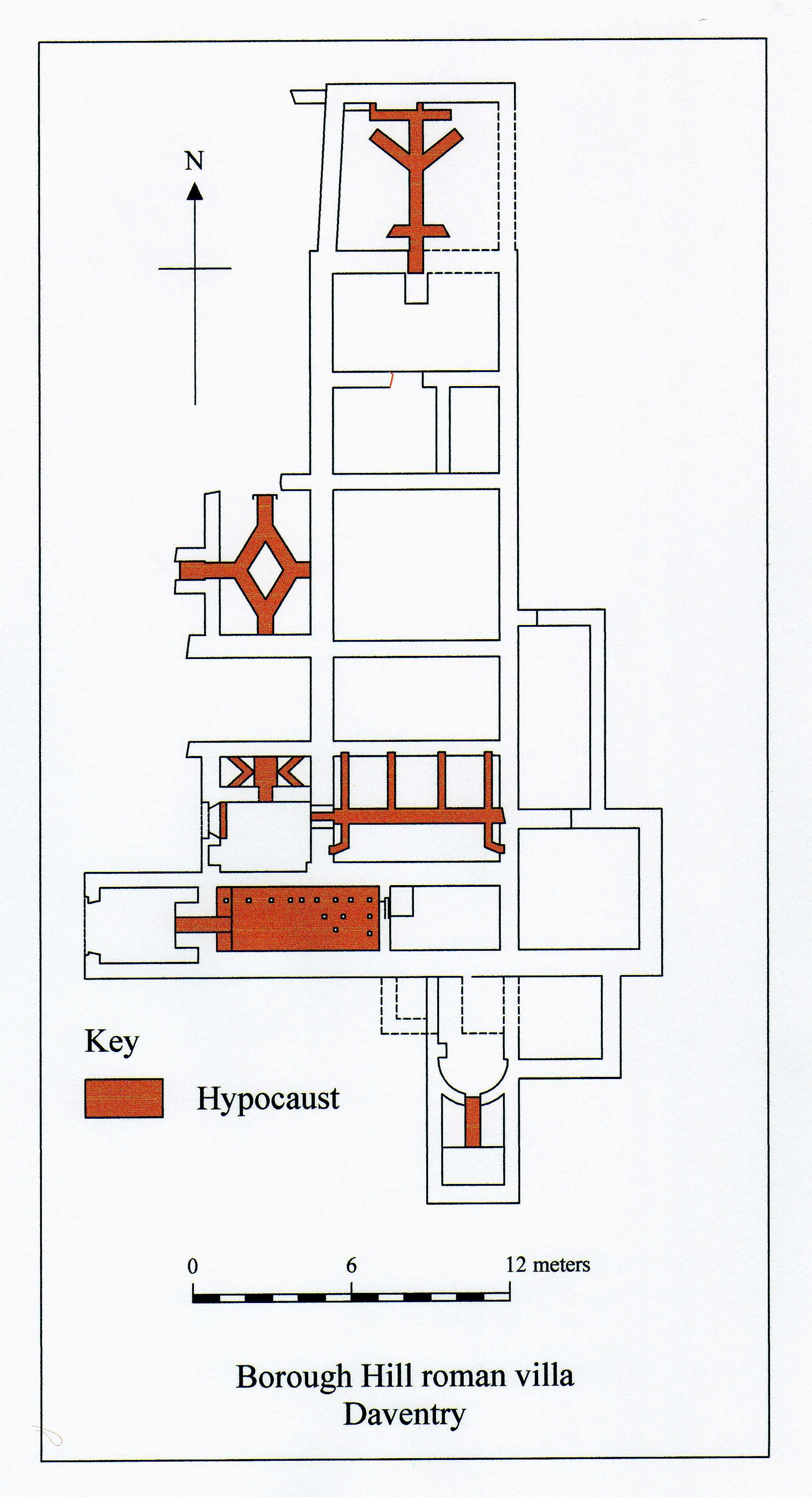
- Plan of Borough Hill Roman villa

- Borough Hill within Northamptonshire

General information
- Type: Roman Building
- Location: At the north end of Borough Hill, England
- Coordinates: 52.263422°N 1.138252°W

Borough Hill Roman villa is located on the north tip of Borough Hill, a prominent hill near the town of Daventry in Northamptonshire. The villa’s remains lie within the ramparts of an Iron Age fortress which covers the summit of the hill. The remains of the Roman villa were discovered in 1823 by the historian and archaeologist George Baker, who identified Borough Hill with the Benaventa of the Britons and Isannavaria of the Romans. The remains were not fully excavated until 1852 when local historian Beriah Botfield thoroughly excavated and recorded the site. Botfield employed an artist to make drawings of the site and these illustrations along with Botfield's notes, manuscripts and some of the antiquities found on the site are now kept at the British Museum.

== The excavations ==
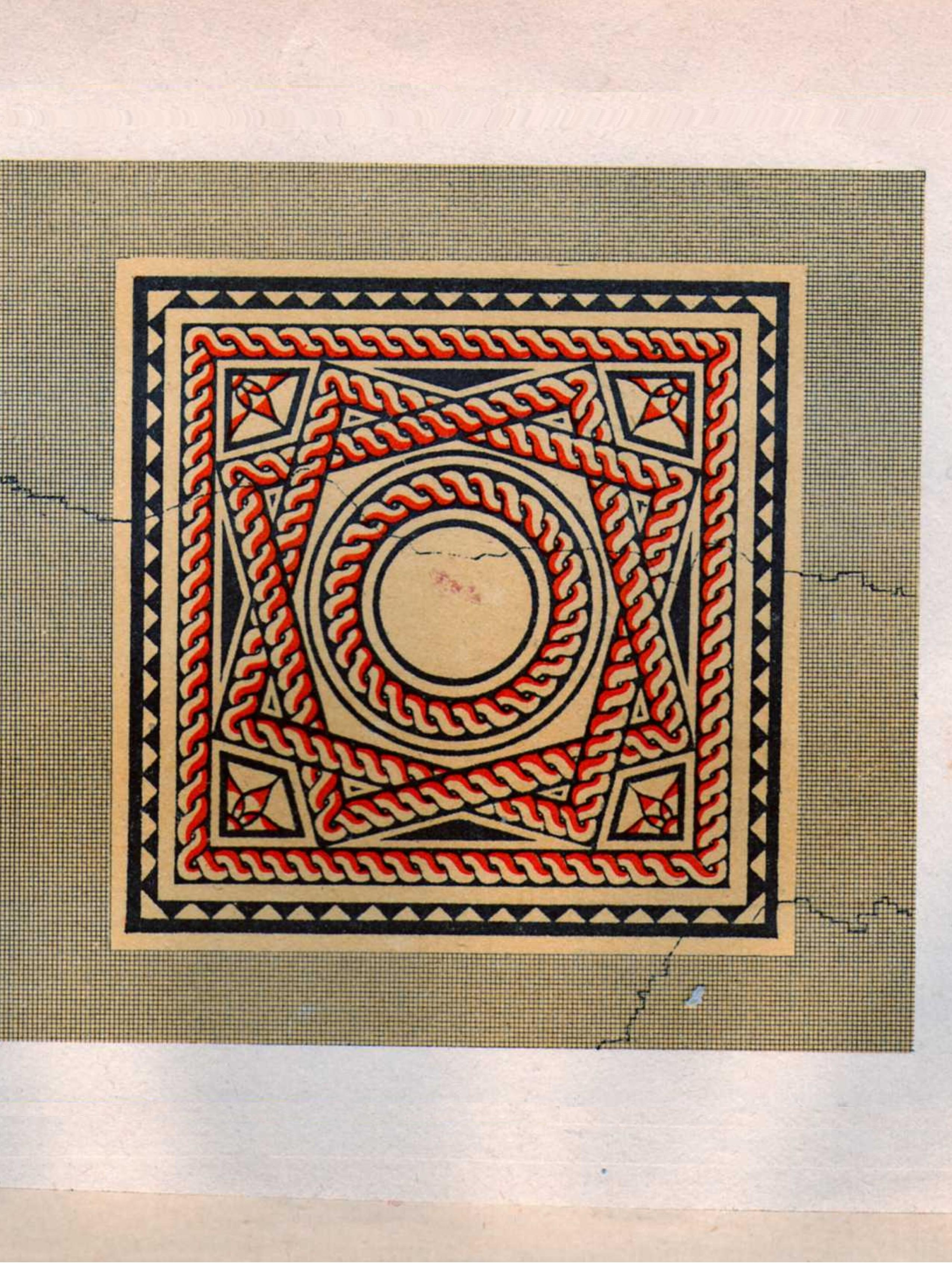
Pattern of one of the villa's mosaic floors

Botfield’s excavations revealed a large range of rooms which ran from north to south, part of which was a bath suite. It was deduced that the buildings were built over a period of time and that the northern rooms are later additions. The earliest parts of the villa were built in the early years of the Roman occupation. The villa consisted of a single storey and was constructed from the local marlstone (sandstone), infilled with rubble. The inside walls were plastered, as may have been the exterior, although this is not certain. The building had a tiled roof, examples of which can be seen in Northampton Museum. Some specimens of frescoed plaster were found still clinging to the remains of interior walls. It was also discovered that the villa had an elaborate heating system installed under the building. Hot air from a furnace or hypocaust flowed through the building by means of flues. Some of the floors were supported upon brick or flat stone piers which supported the floor leaving a two to three foot gap in which the air flowed. Botfield also discovered a well south-west of the villa. The well was stone lined and in the upper levels of the well a skeleton was found, with bronze accoutrements as well as an iron fibula (a brooch) and hook.

== The site today ==
A walk across the site of the villa reveals nothing today. Botfield very carefully backfilled the site to its original state. The nature of the construction of this villa, being built from sandstone, meant that the only way these remains would survive the ravages of the British weather was to backfill the site.

== See also ==
- Bannaventa
- Piddington Roman Villa near Northampton
