= Lactodurum =

Town in Roman Britain

Coordinates: 52.131°N 0.989°W

Lactodorum was a town in the Roman province of Britannia. Today it is known as Towcester, located in the English county of Northamptonshire.

Towcester lays claim to being the oldest town in Northamptonshire and possibly, because of the antiquity of recent Iron Age finds in the town, to be one of the oldest continuously inhabited settlements in the country. There is evidence that it was settled by humans since the Mesolithic era (middle Stone Age). There is also evidence of Iron Age burials in the area.

== Watling Street ==
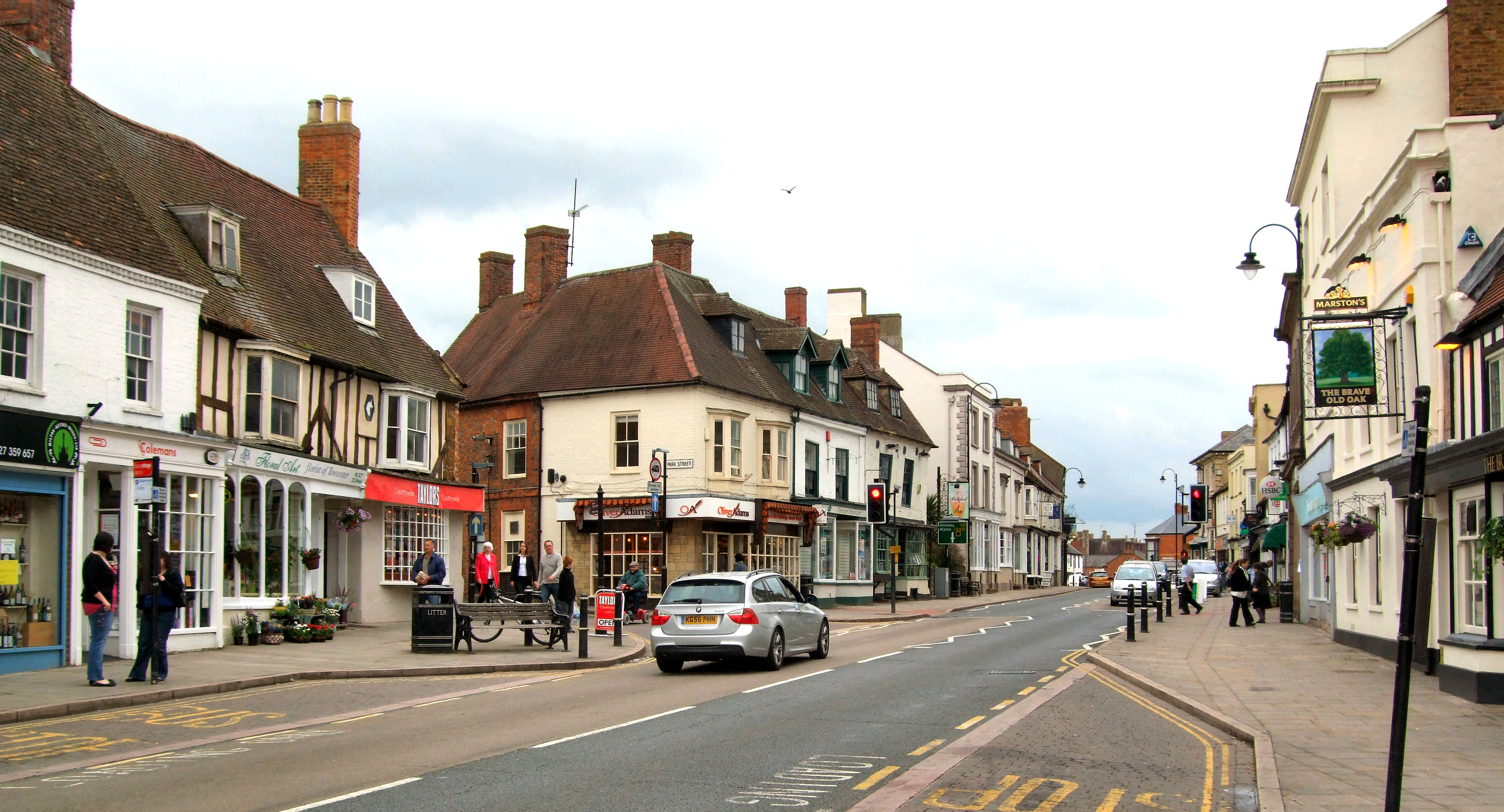
Watling Street Roman road, looking north

Watling Street north of St Albans. The map shows the Roman towns established along Watling Street by the end of the first century AD.

In Roman times, the Watling Street road (now the A5) was built through the area and Lactodorum, probably a garrison fort, was established on the site of the present day town. Some local people believe that the original pre-Roman settlement was about half a mile to the south of the present town, at the top of the hill at the crossing of a section of north–south road which became part of the Roman Watling Street and an east–west cattle drovers road (now a minor road called 'cow pastures'), and that there was a small trading post type of settlement there. Two candidate sites for the Battle of Watling Street, fought in 61AD, are located close to the town, these are Church Stowe which is located 7 km to the north and Paulerspury which is 5 km to the south.

The fort was soon replaced by a civilian settlement which may have grown out of the surrounding vicus. Late 1st-century timber buildings were replaced in stone the following century, and included a possible mansio. By the mid-2nd century, there were numerous shops lining the roadsides. 3rd- and 4th-century private residences were decorated with tesselated pavements and painted with decorative plaster.

== Town wall ==
Lactodorum was encompassed by a wall that was strengthened at several points by stone and brick towers. The wall was also surrounded by a ditch, part of which became the Mill Leat on the east side of the town. The modern-day St Lawrence's Church in Towcester is thought to occupy the site of a large Roman civic building, possibly a temple; although there was also a bath house in this area. Small fragments of Roman pavement can be seen next to the Church's boiler room.

The Roman suburbs consisted of timber and cob buildings within small rectilinear plots, probably representing small holdings. However, there was also evidence of much industry: smithing, pottery, lead, pewter and bronze working.

== See also ==
- Roman Britain
