= Norton, Northamptonshire =

Village in Northamptonshire, England

Coordinates: 52.269108°N 1.116969°W

Norton
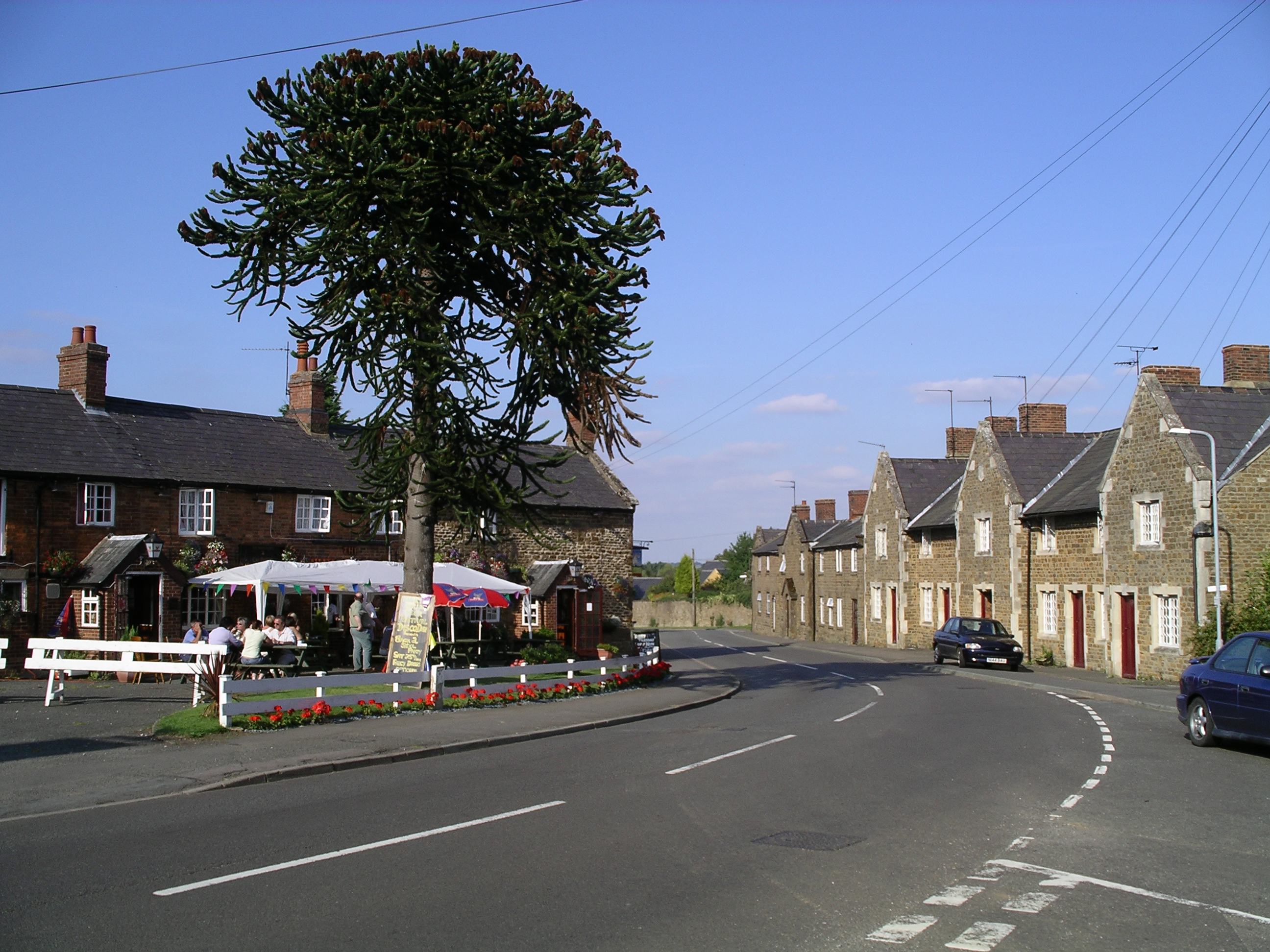
- The village of Norton

- Location within Northamptonshire
- Population: 434 (2011 Census)
- OS grid reference: SP602638
- Civil parish: Norton
- Unitary authority: West Northamptonshire
- Ceremonial county: Northamptonshire
- Region: East Midlands
- Country: England
- Sovereign state: United Kingdom
- Post town: DAVENTRY
- Postcode district: NN11
- Dialling code: 01327
- Police: Northamptonshire
- Fire: Northamptonshire
- Ambulance: East Midlands
- UK Parliament: Daventry

Norton is a village in West Northamptonshire, England. The population including Brokhall and Norton at the 2011 census was 434. The village is about 2 miles (3.2 km) east of Daventry, 11 miles (18 km) west of Northampton. Junction 16 of the M1 motorway is about 7 miles (11 km) south-east and the nearest railway station is at Long Buckby 3 miles (5 km) to the east. Near the village, on Watling Street, is the Roman settlement of Bannaventa. Norton civil parish includes the hamlet of Muscott.

== History ==
The villages name means 'North farm/settlement'.

Some of the earliest residents of the village were the Romans, who built the Roman settlement of Bannaventa, a Romano-British fortified town on the eastern outskirts of the village located on the Roman road of Watling Street (A5 London to Holyhead road). Material representing the remains of the Roman settlement of Bannaventa has been recovered from a strip around 200 metres (200 yards) wide on either side of a 1 1/4-mile (2 km) length of Watling Street, in agricultural land north-west of the village, at Whilton Lodge. The settlement's defences were in the form of a trapezium, not aligned with Watling Street, and the enclosure was deeper on the east side of the street than it was on the west.

The four sides of the enclosure were 190, 200, 250, and 250 metres (210, 220, 270, and 270 yards), measured clockwise from north, and enclosed an area of about 5.5 hectares (14 acres). The defences were built in two – possibly three – phases. First: a large ditch 7.6 metres wide and 3.1 metres deep (25 ft × 10 ft) backed by a clay and turf rampart was constructed after the end of the first century; second: the primary ditch was filled in with gravel early in the fourth century to provide a firm base for a stone wall with foundations 3.7 metres (12 ft) wide and fronted by two newly-cut, parallel ditches; the inner 5.2 metres wide and 2.4 metres deep (17 ft × 8 ft) and the outer 4.3 metres wide and 1.8 metres deep (14 ft × 6 ft); and thirdly: The inner ditch was filled with gravel shortly after the second phase was completed, perhaps intended as the firm base for external towers, though none have been discovered. The outer ditch was allowed to silt up by the end of the fourth century. Occupation of the site, which may have begun before the Roman conquest, continued into the fourth century.

There is a Roman villa site at the nearby village of Nether Heyford to the south east.

== Possible association with Saint Patrick ==
It is possible, but unsubstantiated, that Bannaventa was the birthplace of St Patrick, the patron saint of Ireland. In his Confessio, Patrick writes:

I had as my father the deacon Calpornius, son of the late Potitus, a priest, who belonged to the small town of Bannavem Taberniae; he had a small estate nearby, and it was there I was taken captive.

This could possibly be an alternative name for Bannaventa. In around 405 AD when he was aged 16 he was kidnapped by "pirates" who were raiding the imperial highways, and taken to Ireland as a slave. This view is backed by the fact that Watling Street ran indirectly to north Wales and thus offered easy passage to Ireland.

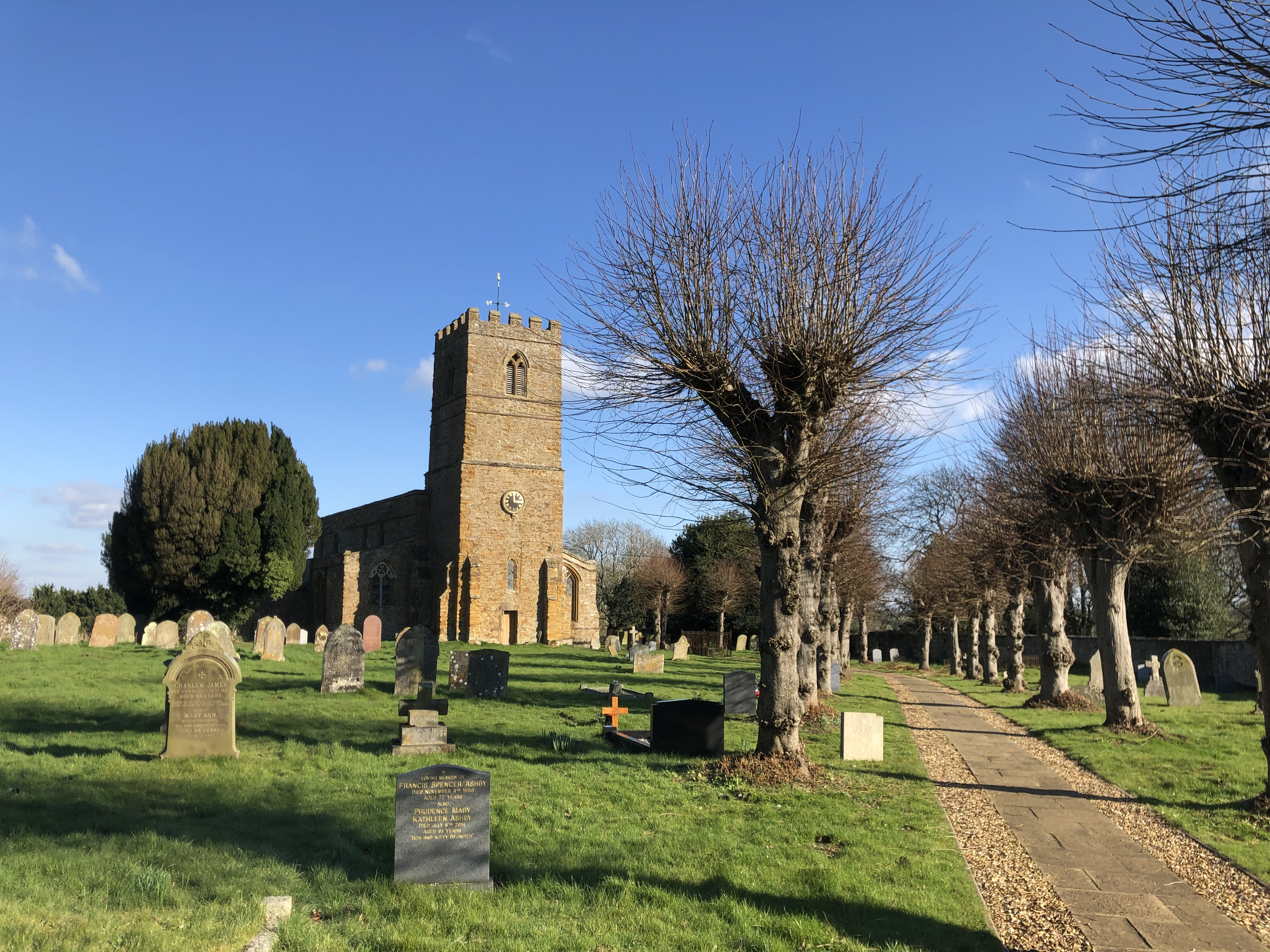
All Saints Parish Church, Norton in 2022

== The Domesday Book ==
Norton appears in the Domesday Book and some of the people mentioned in its entry are as follows: Aghmund; Alric; Alvred; Azur; Bisceop; Count Alan; Durand; Edwin; Fredegis; Fulcher; Gilbert; Godwine; Ingelrann; King William as landholder; Leofnoth; Leofric; Leofwine; Lokki; Martin; Nigel; Ordmaer; Osmund; Ralph; Ralph the steward; Robert; Robert, Count of Meulan; Robert, Count of Mortain; Sawata; Scotel; Segrim; Siward; Stenkil; Thorbiorn; Thorir; Walter; William; Wulfmaer.

== Village amenities ==
The village hall is situated near the Parish Church of All Saints. The village has one public house, The White Horse. To the east of the village is a shopping complex in a converted set of farm buildings trading as 'The Heart of the Shires Shopping Village'.

== Gallery ==
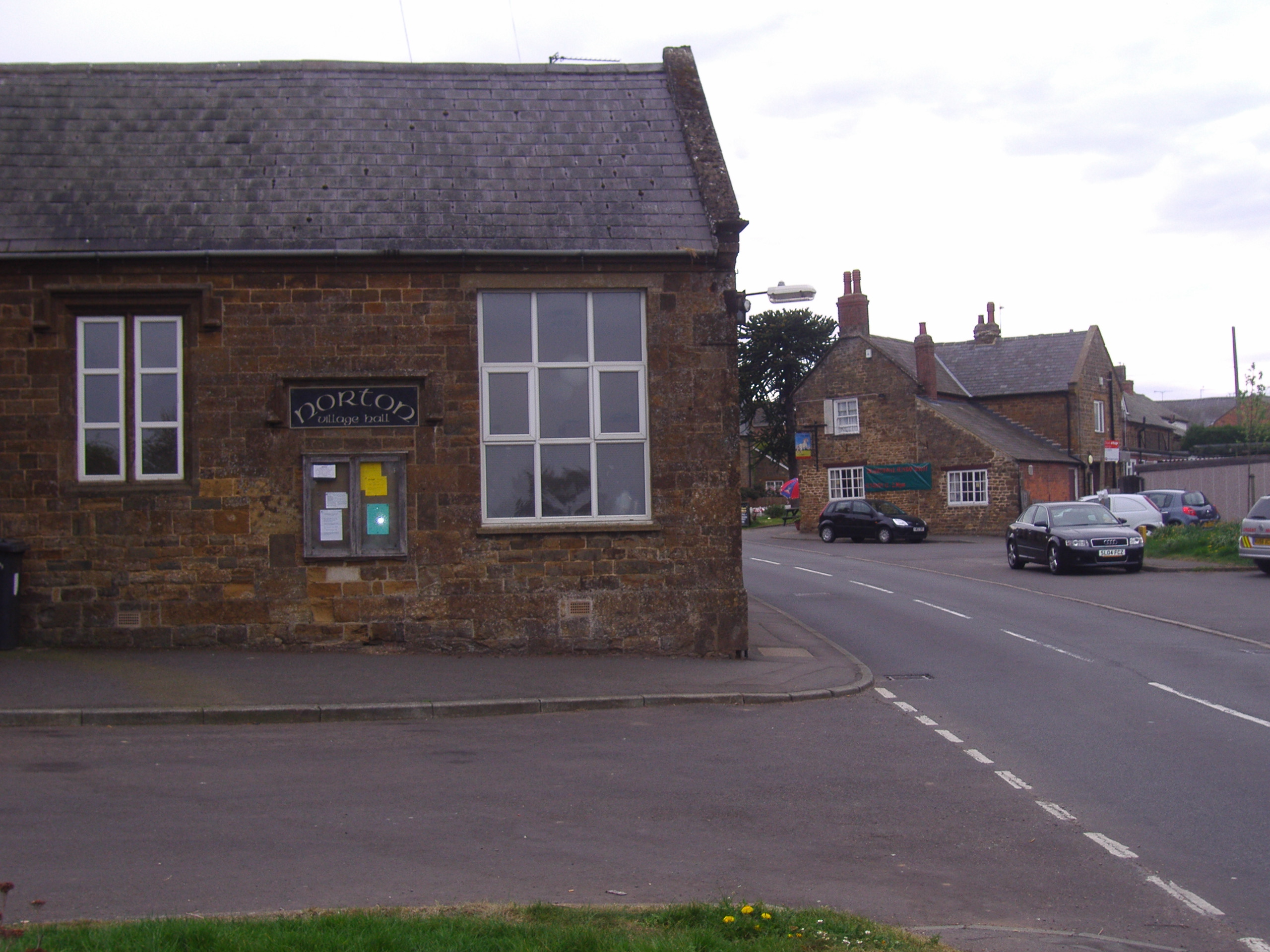
The main road looking west

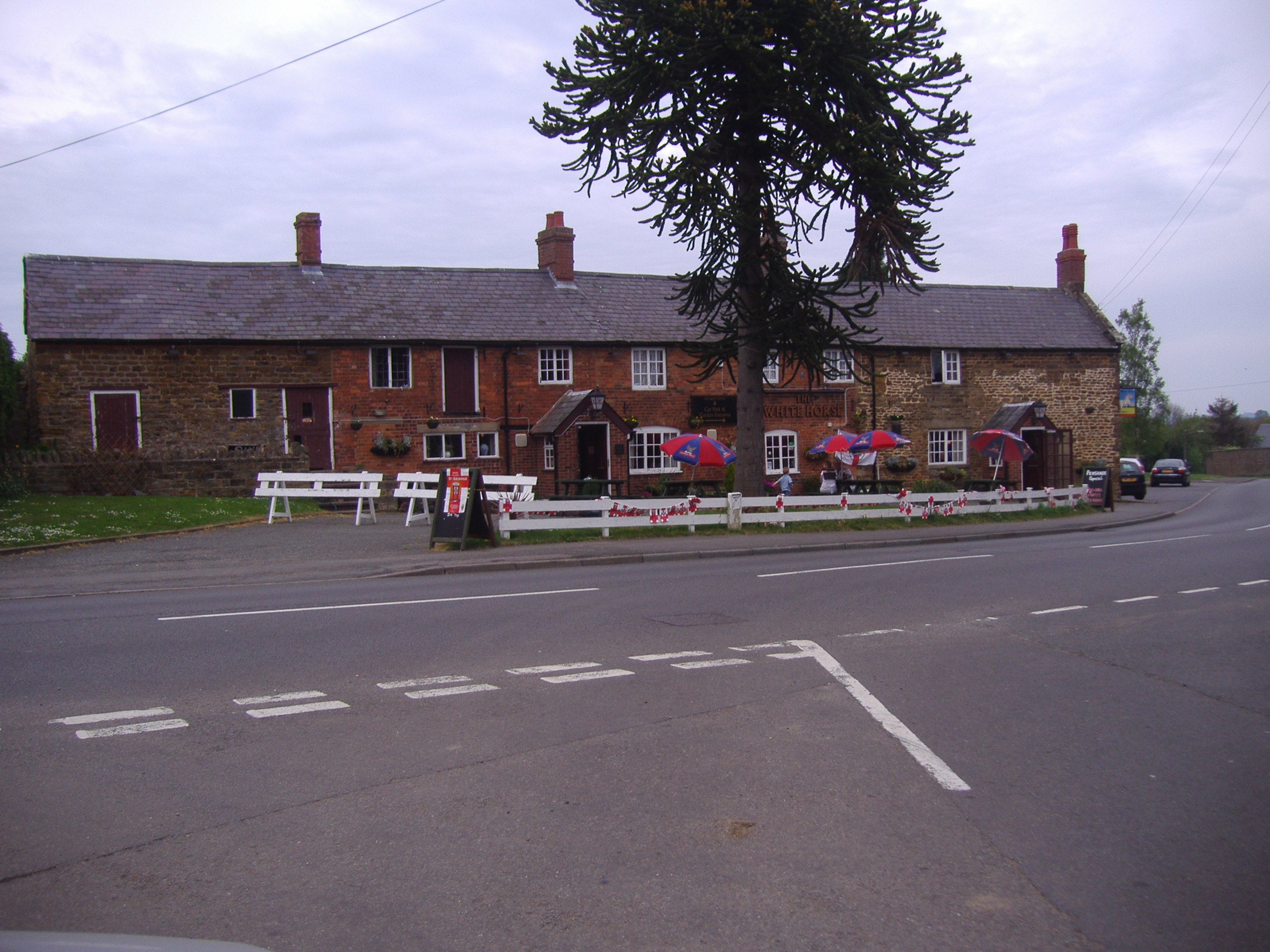
The White Horse pub

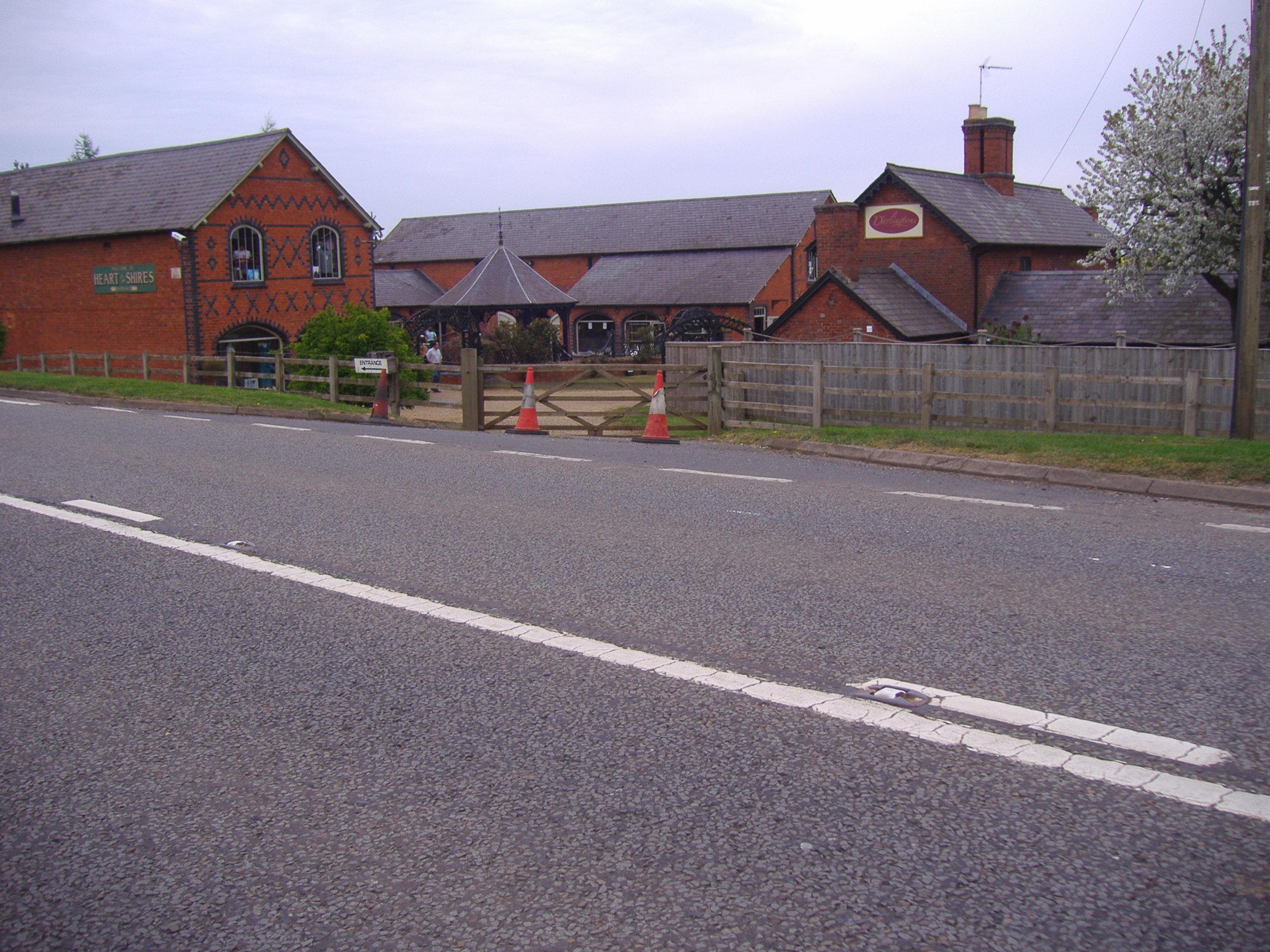
The Heart of the Shires shopping village
