= Upper Stowe =

Village in Northamptonshire, England

Coordinates: 52.2030°N 1.0576°W

- Location within Northamptonshire
- OS grid reference: SP6456
- Unitary authority: West Northamptonshire
- Ceremonial county: Northamptonshire
- Region: East Midlands
- Country: England
- Sovereign state: United Kingdom
- Post town: Northampton
- Postcode district: NN7
- Dialling code: 01327
- Police: Northamptonshire
- Fire: Northamptonshire
- Ambulance: East Midlands
- UK Parliament: Daventry

Upper Stowe is a village in West Northamptonshire in England. It is in the civil parish of Stowe Nine Churches. It has a church dedicated to St James. This was built to the design of P.C Hardwick in 1855. It has a bellcote rather than a tower.

The name 'Stowe' derives from Old English word for 'place'.
