= Theodor Schultes =

German engineer of radio frequency

- Born: 10 September 1901; Marpingen, Germany
- Died: 16 March 1981 (aged 79); Starnberg, Germany
- Education: Technische Universität Darmstadt
- Known for: Radar technology
- Scientific career
- Fields: Radio Physics
- Workplaces: Heinrich Hertz Institute; GEMA

Theodor Schultes or Theodor Jakob Joseph Schultes (1901-1981) was a German engineer of radio frequency technology and a pioneer of radar technology . His best known developments include the radio measuring devices with the code names Freya, Aquarius and Jagdschloß.

== Education ==
Schultes, born the son of a savings bank director, attended high school in Völklingen until he graduated from high school. After one year of practical work at the Röchling factories, he studied electrical engineering at the Technical University of Darmstadt from 1921 to 1926. He then worked there as a research assistant, from 1929 to 1933 as an assistant, and in 1934 he did his doctorate in electrical engineering and information technology.

== Career ==
In 1933 he moved to Berlin and continued his research in the area of room acoustics at the Heinrich Hertz Institute for Vibration Research. As early as June 1934, he moved to the newly founded Society for Electro-Acoustic and Mechanical Apparatus (GEMA) to take over the management of the research laboratory.

Here, Schultes and his team developed the first practical radio measuring devices. An essential task was the development of suitable transmitter tubes.

In 1937, after further extensive tests, Schultes developed the Freya radio measuring device . It worked with a wavelength of 240 centimeters, was portable and intended for the detection of flight destinations. Freya had a range of around 100 kilometers. Another of Schulte's inventions was the Jagdschloß panoramic viewer, which was constructed in 1943 . It was used to display all aircraft on a large display board, which were located in the air space, which was electronically scanned up to 150 kilometers away.
