= Borough Hill =

Hill to the east of the town of Daventry in the English county of Northamptonshire

Coordinates: 52.25484°N 1.14003°W

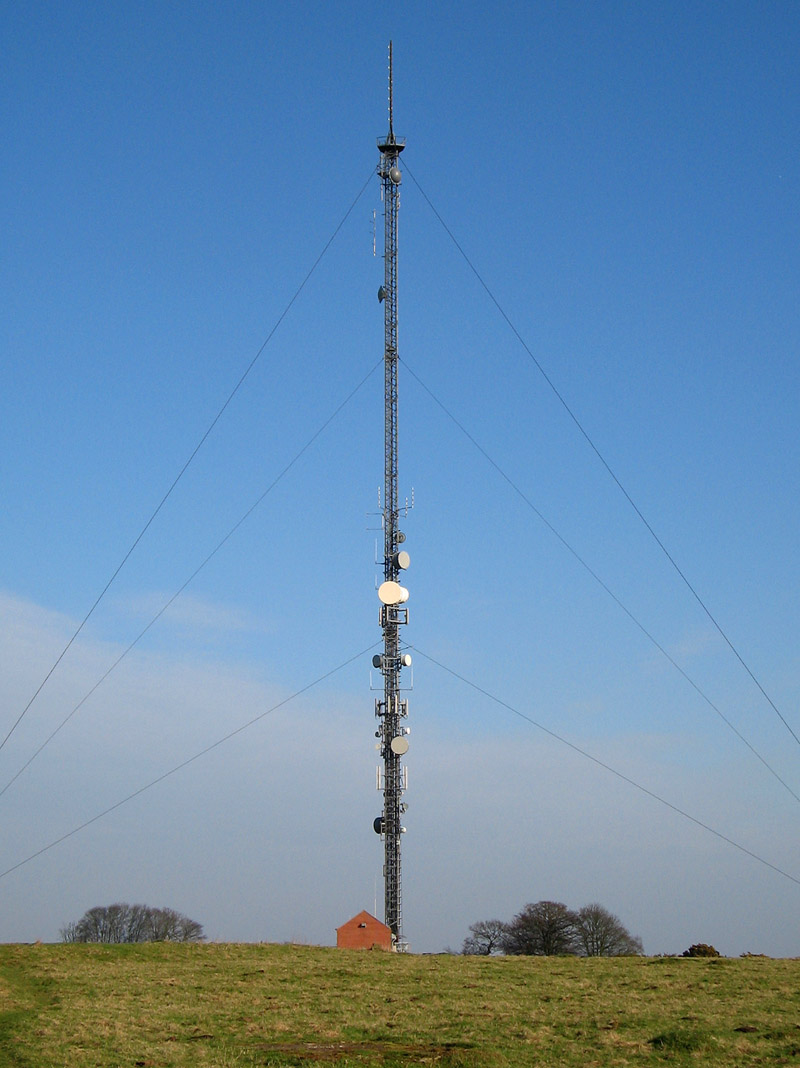
- The last remaining radio mast on the hill

Highest point
- Elevation: 199 m (653 ft)

Geography
- Location: Daventry, Northamptonshire, England

Geology
- Mountain type: Prominent hill

Climbing
- Easiest route: Lane up to the BBC Transmitting station

Borough Hill is a hill to the east of the town of Daventry in the English county of Northamptonshire. It is over 200 metres (660 ft) above sea level and dominates the surrounding area.

== History ==
Borough Hill has a history of human habitation dating into prehistory. Remains have been found on the hill of two Bronze Age barrows, two Iron Age hillforts, one of which is the fourth largest found in Britain, and a later Roman villa and farming settlement. The hill is designated as a scheduled monument.

In 1823, the historian and archaeologist George Baker undertook the first excavation of the site, he discovered the remains of the Roman villa. The site then underwent a full excavation in 1852 by local historian Beriah Botfield who recorded his findings. His notes, manuscripts and some of the antiquities found are now kept at the British Museum.

In 1645, Borough Hill was used as a base by the Royalist army of King Charles I, in the week prior to the Battle of Naseby, in which the Royalists were defeated by Sir Thomas Fairfax's Parliamentarian army.

== Transmitting station ==
In 1925 the BBC constructed a transmitting station which initially was used for long wave, and short wave broadcasting. The long wave service was moved to a new and better transmitter station located at Wychbold village near Droitwich in 1934.

On 26 February 1935, the transmitter was used for an early RADAR experiment, which demonstrated the feasibility of radio detection of aircraft. This was conducted by Robert Watson-Watt and Arnold Wilkins.

In 1950 the BBC constructed a 720 ft (220 m) mast at nearby Dodford for the BBC Third Programme, with a 150 kW transmitter in a building near to the short wave transmitter building. This service closed in 1978 and the mast was removed in 1984.

Due to the nature of short wave broadcasting, large areas of Borough Hill were occupied with towers, and masts to support large antennas. Transmissions from the short wave station could be received across the world.

Many engineers were employed by the BBC to work at the station and a number decided to settle in Daventry, and to this day many former BBC staff remain in Daventry.

The BBC decided to close the station and on 28 March 1992 the last transmission took place, and the transmission equipment was moved to other BBC World Service transmitters around the country. The station became an electronic service centre for the repair of BBC transmission equipment, and a local transmitter maintenance team was also based here until the late 1990s. All but one of the radio masts have been taken down, with Arqiva now operating the single remaining mast.

== Royal Observer Corps Post ==
Borough Hill was the location of ROC Post Daventry, part of the United Kingdom Warning and Monitoring Organisation. The post was closed in September 1991.

== Today ==
After the closure of the radio station, most of the land was bought by the former Daventry District Council who opened it up to the public as a country park. Since 2021 it has been managed by its successor, West Northamptonshire Council.
