= Church Stowe =

Village in Northamptonshire, England

Coordinates: 52.2120°N 1.0721°W

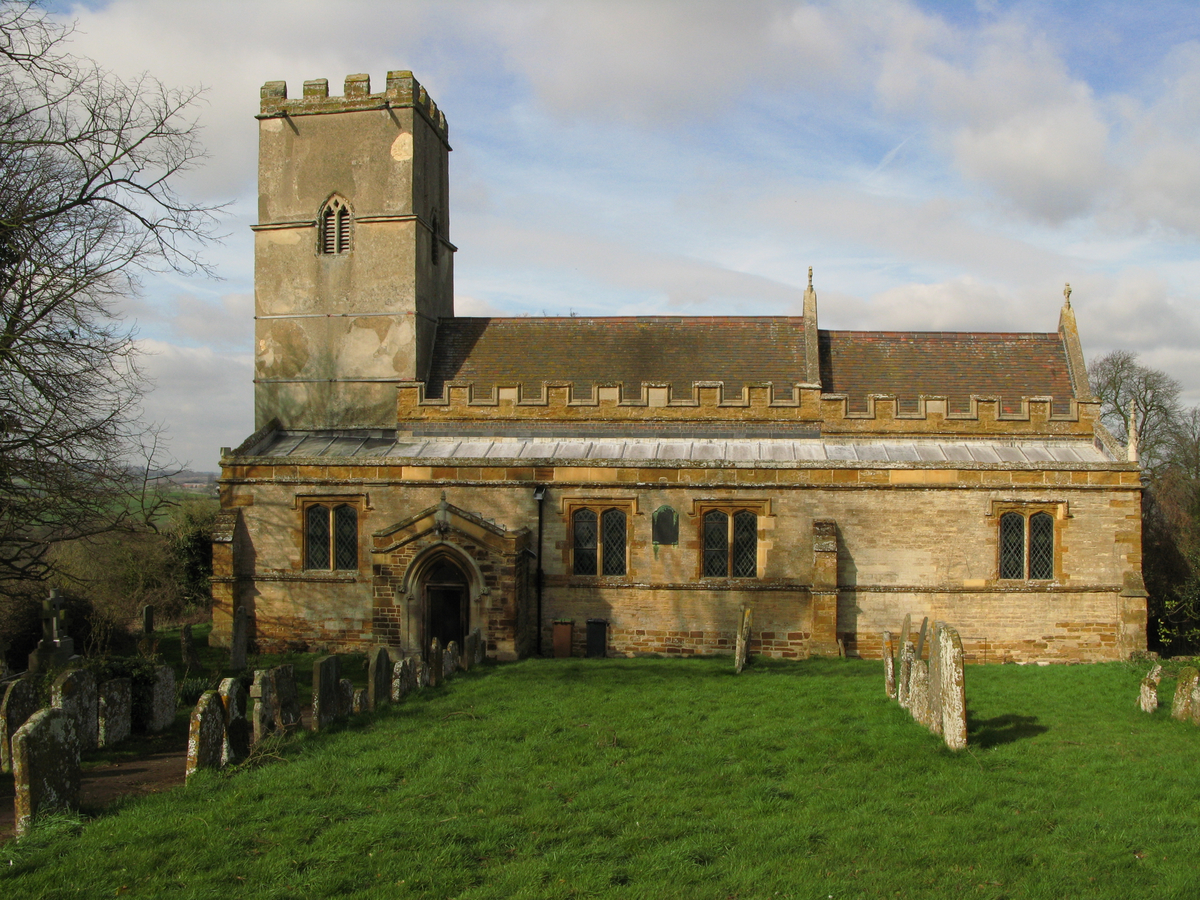
- Church of St Michael

- Location within Northamptonshire
- OS grid reference: SP6357
- Unitary authority: West Northamptonshire
- Ceremonial county: Northamptonshire
- Region: East Midlands
- Country: England
- Sovereign state: United Kingdom
- Post town: Northampton
- Postcode district: NN7
- Dialling code: 01327
- Police: Northamptonshire
- Fire: Northamptonshire
- Ambulance: East Midlands
- UK Parliament: Daventry

Church Stowe is a village in West Northamptonshire in England. It is the largest settlement in the civil parish of Stowe Nine Churches (Where the population is included).

St Michael's church is notable for the tomb of Elizabeth Danvers and the tower built in Anglo Saxon times. The rest of the church was built in 1639 but includes remains of the medieval church. The east end was rebuilt in 1860

According to legend, the site of the church was chosen by a supernatural spirit. It is said that the church's builders found their materials moved to a different location overnight for nine consecutive nights, so they eventually built the church in that location. This is supposedly where the name Stowe Nine Churches derives from.
