= Financial Services Skills Commission =

Industry advocacy group in the UK

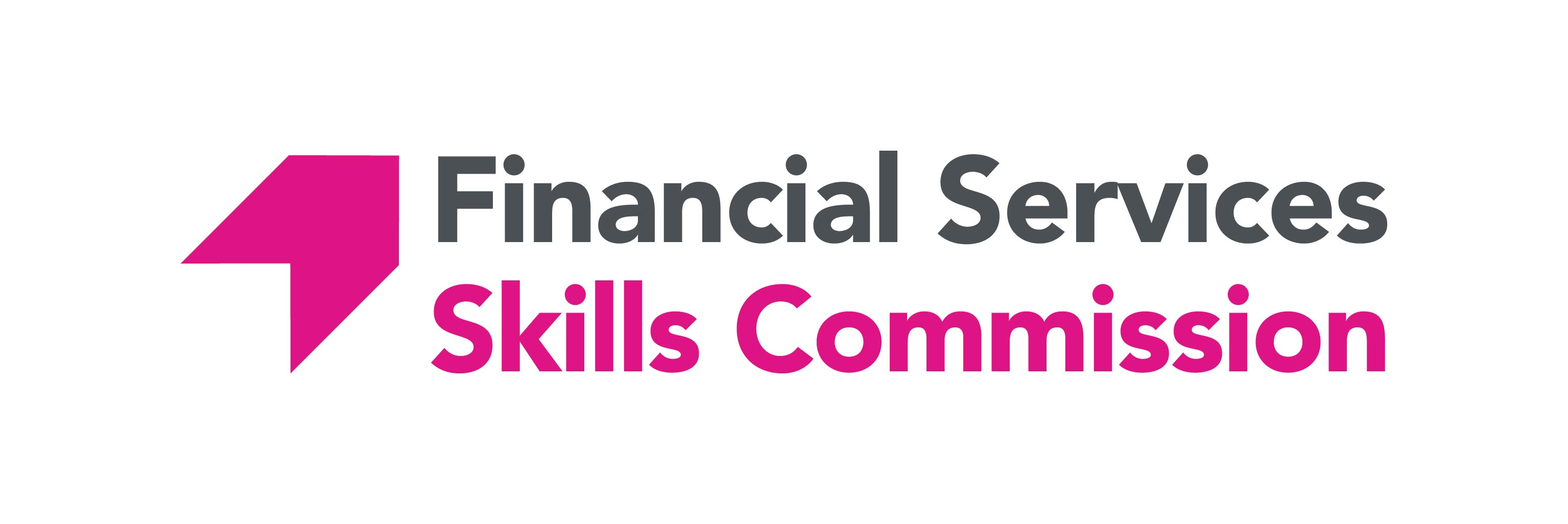
- Formation: 2020
- Legal status: Non-profit company
- Purpose: Financial and related professional services industry
- Headquarters: London EC3
- Region served: United Kingdom
- Chair: Mark Hoban
- Chief Executive: Claire Tunley
- Staff: 10
- Website: Financial Services Skills Commission

The Financial Services Skills Commission is an independent, not for profit, member-led body, representing the UK's financial services sector on skills.

The commission was founded as a key recommendation from the work of the Financial Services Skills Taskforce, launched by former Chancellor of the Exchequer, Philip Hammond MP.

The commission's purpose is to increase the supply of talent and skills across the financial services sector. It seeks to do this by encouraging reskilling and upskilling, and broadening the pool of talent through improved attraction and retention. It currently has more than 40 member firms, collectively employing around a third of the industry's workforce.

== History ==
In June 2018, then Chancellor of the Exchequer Philip Hammond announced the creation of a Financial Services Skills Taskforce as part of his Mansion House speech. Hammond said the Taskforce would assess the long-term skills needs of the UK financial services sector, amid rapid technological and social change.

The Taskforce was chaired by then City Minister Mark Hoban and convened by TheCityUK, with support from the City of London Corporation.

A final report was published by Economic Secretary to the Treasury John Glen MP in January 2020. The report identified the impact that new technology, demographic change and globalisation could have on the UK financial services sector. It also recommended forming a long-term industry body to drive skills across the sector.

The Financial Services Skills Commission was subsequently formed in May 2020. Claire Tunley, former Head of Skills at the City of London Corporation, was appointed chief executive in May 2020.

=== Financial Services Skills Compact ===
In July 2025, HM Treasury published its 'Leeds Reforms' in which it sought to "rewire financial system, boost investment and create skilled jobs across the UK." As part of the publication, Economic Secretary to the Treasury Emma Reynolds MP stated that the Financial Services Skills Commission would develop a 'skills compact' to accelerate progress on skills within the sector, as well as research into artificial intelligence. The work will be delivered by the commission with the support of TheCityUK and the City of London Corporation. The Financial Services Skills Compact was launched in July 2026 alongside Chancellor of the Exchequer Rachel Reeves' Mansion House speech. It was described as "the most significant government-employer skills agreement in a generation." Firms initially committing to the Skills Compact included London Stock Exchange Group, Nationwide Building Society, Standard Chartered, Yorkshire Building Society, and Zopa.

=== Disruptive technology research ===
In November 2025, the Economic Secretary to the Treasury Lucy Rugby MP gave the Commission formal approval to begin work on research into artificial intelligence, disruptive technology, and its impact on employee skills in financial services. The research was supported by the City of London Corporation, TheCityUK, Lloyds Banking Group and PwC. A first report was published in May 2026 and a final report is due in 2027.
