= Paul Myners, Baron Myners =

British businessman and peer (1948–2022)

The Right Honourable The Lord Myners CBE
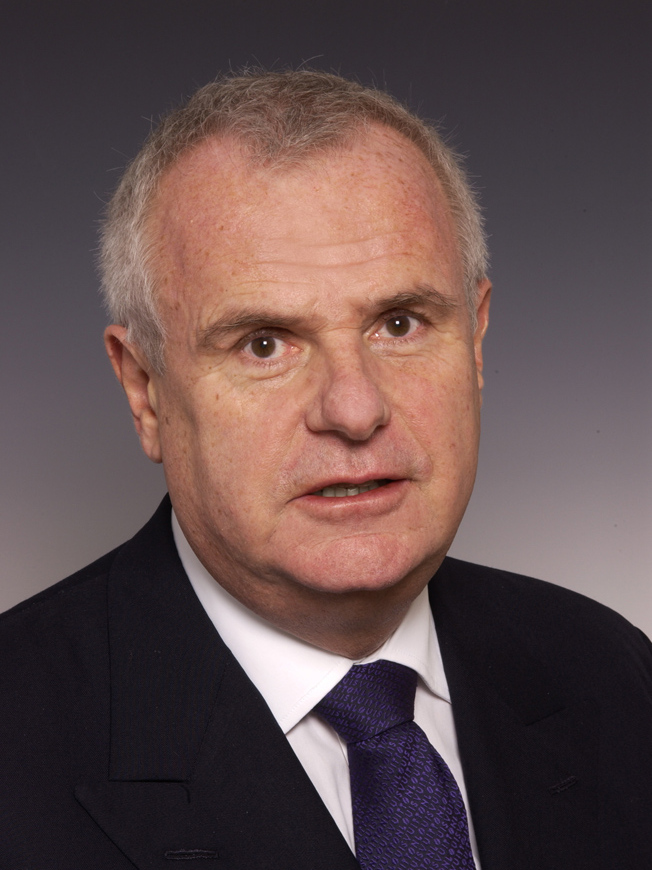
- Official portrait, 2006

Financial Services Secretary to the Treasury
- In office 3 October 2008 – 13 May 2010
- Prime Minister: Gordon Brown
- Preceded by: Office established
- Succeeded by: Mark Hoban (as City Minister)

Member of the House of Lords
- Lord Temporal
- Life peerage 16 October 2008 – 16 January 2022

Personal details
- Born: 1 April 1948 Bath, Somerset, England
- Died: 16 January 2022 (aged 73) Chelsea, London, England
- Party: None (crossbencher)
- Other political affiliations: Non-affiliated (2014–2015); Labour (2008–2014)
- Spouses: Tessa Stanford-Smith (m. 1972; div. 1993); Alison Macleod (after 1993)
- Children: 5
- Education: University of London

Paul Myners, Baron Myners, CBE (1 April 1948 – 16 January 2022) was a British businessman and politician. In October 2008 he was elevated to the House of Lords as a life peer and was appointed City Minister in the Labour Government of Gordon Brown, serving until May 2010. As City Minister Myners was responsible for overseeing the financial services sector during the 2008 financial crisis and its aftermath, including leading the controversial 2008 United Kingdom bank rescue package. Myners sat in the House of Lords as a Labour peer until 2014, resigning to become a non-affiliated member before joining the crossbench group in 2015.

Myners began working in the financial sector in 1974 at N M Rothschild & Sons and was appointed to the board of directors in 1977. Subsequently, he held a number of high-profile business roles, including as chairman of Gartmore Group, Land Securities and Marks & Spencer. He also served in a number of third sector and public service posts, including chairman of the trustees of the Tate, chairman of the Guardian Media Group, chairman of the Low Pay Commission and non-executive director of the Bank of England.

== Early life and education ==
Myners was born in Bath, Somerset, England on 1 April 1948. He was adopted at the age of two by a Cornish family, and grew up in Truro, Cornwall. His adopting father was a self-employed butcher and fisherman and his mother a hairdresser. He had no siblings. He attended Truro School, an independent Methodist school, on a scholarship. He graduated from the University of London, Institute of Education, with a first class honours degree in education and a certificate in education (teaching qualification), and became a secondary school teacher in Wandsworth with the Inner London Education Authority (1971–72). He left teaching after two years and subsequently joined The Daily Telegraph as a financial journalist moving into the financial sector in 1974 as a junior portfolio manager at N M Rothschild & Sons.

== Career ==
=== Business ===
After serving on the Rothschild board of directors from 1977 to 1985, Myners moved to pension fund manager Gartmore Group as chief executive and was appointed chairman in 1987. During his tenure Gartmore's assets under management rose from £1.2bn in 1985 to £75bn, with Myners personally earning an estimated £30m. After retiring from Gartmore in 2000, he chose to focus on a wider range of interests, acting as non-executive director and chairman of a number of companies and third sector institutions.

From 2002 to 2007 Myners was chairman of Aspen Insurance Holdings, a Bermuda-based insurance company. Myners was appointed interim chairman of retailer Marks & Spencer in 2004 in the midst of a takeover battle with Phillip Green's Arcadia Group, leaving the position two years later in 2006 after successfully resisting the hostile merger attempt. From 2006 to 2008 he was chairman of Liberty Ermitage, a fund-of-funds manager. and Land Securities.

=== Public service and philanthropy ===
Myners compiled reports on institutional investment (the Myners Report, questioning whether pension funds were acting in the interests of their beneficiaries), equity capital raising and governance for HM Treasury and the Department of Trade and Industry [two reports before 1997 and three after]. This report gave rise to the Myners Principles which formed the basis for good stewardship of the investment of pension funds and endowments. The Myners Report also made the case for investors taking a more active interest in the ownership of investee companies ('activism') and argued that investment banks should no longer be paid for research by transaction commission, a practice which he argued was misaligned with good ownership and lacking in transparency and accountability.

In 2000 Myners became Chairman of the Guardian Media Group, publisher of The Guardian and The Observer newspapers and was appointed a non-executive director of the Bank of England.

Between August 2007 and October 2008 he was Chairman of the Personal Accounts Delivery Authority (PADA), the body tasked under the Pensions Act 2007 with implementing the UK Government's plans for a new national pensions savings scheme for private sector workers on low and moderate incomes. He resigned this position on his appointment as a minister. PADA morphed into NEST, the National Employment Savings Trust.

Myners also served as chairman of the Low Pay Commission from 2006 until 2008, as a member of the Commission on English Prisons, established by the Howard League for Penal Reform, and the Green Fiscal Commission, and was a member of the Commission on Vulnerable Employment sponsored by the TUC, and a trustee of the Smith Institute, an education and public policy think tank. He was Chairman of the Trustees of the Tate, a past trustee at the National Gallery and the Royal Academy Trust, trustee of the Charity Aid Foundation and served on the Advisory Council of St. Paul's Cathedral Institute. Myners resigned from these posts when he became a Minister.

== Government minister ==
On 3 October 2008 Myners was appointed Financial Services Secretary to the Treasury (a position commonly referred to as City Minister) in HM Treasury, in Prime Minister Gordon Brown's ministry. He was created a Life Peer on 16 October 2008, gazetted as "Baron Myners, of Truro in the County of Cornwall". Although never active in politics before his appointment as a finance minister, The Independent reported that "a Labour Cabinet insider" said of him that "for a City grandee he has a genuine instinct for social justice." Myners never donated to the Labour Party, but in 2007 he offered £12,700 to Gordon Brown's leadership campaign.

As City Minister Myners had responsibility for leading the £500bn 2008 United Kingdom bank rescue package in the aftermath of the 2008 financial crisis, as well as for a number of major agencies sponsored by the Treasury including The Debt Management Office, National Savings & Investment, UK Financial Investments and the Asset Protection Agency. Myners also handled the routine ministerial interface between the Treasury and the Financial Services Authority.

In February 2009 Lord Myners was at the centre of controversy concerning the amount of pension paid to Fred Goodwin, the former chairman of the Royal Bank of Scotland. Myners said that he did not approve the details of Goodwin's pension settlement when it was arranged the previous autumn as part of the government's bailout of RBS, pointing out that this was a matter for the Board of RBS. However, former RBS chairman Sir Tom McKillop disputed Myners' account in later evidence to the Treasury Select Committee, insisting that "every element" of Goodwin's financial compensation on leaving the bank had been fully discussed with Myners. The Treasury Committee concluded in their report that "…it would have been far better if Lord Myners had given a stronger, clearer direction of Government requirements for a bank in receipt of public funds and had assured himself by demanding to be kept informed of the detailed negotiations that were taking place…. It would, we believe, have been open to Lord Myners to insist that Goodwin should have been dismissed…. The RBS Board had shown itself to be incompetent in the management of the bank, steering it towards catastrophe… We suspect that Lord Myners' City background, and naiveté as to the public perception of these matters, may have led him to place too much trust in an RBS Board."

The report of the Treasury Select Committee was criticised by many. The respected commentator Hugo Dixon wrote in the Daily Telegraph and the Breaking Views website that the committee should have got ‘a sense of proportion’. He wrote that during the same weekend of the Goodwin pension issue Myners and two Treasury Civil Servants – John Kingman and Tom Scholar – ‘managed to pull off a remarkable feat in pretty much every way. Every other item in that list was ticked off. None was a trivial exercise. All items required attention to complex details; most required negotiations with third parties and banging heads together. Few other Ministers would have been able to accomplish what Myners did that weekend.’ In a separate paper to the Treasury Select Committee, Slaughter and May partner Charles Randell, who accompanied Myners at meetings with RBS noted that Myners had insisted that Goodwin should not be rewarded for failure and all action should be taken to mitigate cost. The RBS representatives at that meeting on 11 October did not indicate that the Board of RBS had significantly enhanced Goodwin's pension entitlement 24hrs earlier as a reward for his contribution to the Bank.

== After government ==
After the Labour Party's loss in the 2010 general election in May 2010, Myners remained in the House of Lords. Until 2014 Myners served as a backbench Labour peer, before resigning to sit as a non-affiliated member and from 7 July 2015 as a crossbencher.

Myners joined the board of RIT Capital Partners PLC, an investment fund chaired and sponsored by Lord (Jacob) Rothschild, and later that year he became a Trustee of ARK, the charity supported by London's major hedge fund managers.

In February 2011, Lord Myners became chairman and a partner of Autonomous Research LLP, an independent equity research firm.

In June 2011, Lord Myners became chairman and a partner of Cevian Capital (UK) LLP, the UK arm of Cevian Capital, the largest active ownership (or activist) manager in Europe.

In October 2012, Lord Myners was appointed President of the Howard League for Penal Reform, replacing the outgoing Lord Carlile of Berriew QC.

In March 2013, Lord Myners joined the board of OJSC MegaFon, a London-listed company that is one of the three largest mobile operators in Russia. Myners was appointed to represent the interest of independent shareholders and served on the Board until the end of 2017.

Lord Myners was the chairman of Platform Acquisition Holdings Ltd, which in May 2013 listed on the London Stock Exchange, raising $905 million earmarked for acquiring a target business expected to have an enterprise value of between $750 million and $2.5 billion.

Platform was a Special Purpose Acquisition Company or SPAC (referred to in the US as a blank cheque corporation). He subsequently Chaired a number of other SPACs, including one that acquired the worldwide operations of Burger King and another that bought the European operations of Birds Eye and Findus.

In December 2013 he joined the Board of the Co-operative Group as senior independent director to produce and publish for the members an independent report on governance. The Co-op had been brought close to collapse in that year by losses in its banking subsidiary and suffered from a scandal involving the chair of the Co-op Bank, Paul Flowers. Myners limited his payment for this work to £1. His report recommended replacing the Co-op's mostly elected board with an appointed one of independent directors with business experience, with the members represented by a National Members Council. The recommendations were heavily criticised from some in the co-operative sector, who described the governance recommendations as "Plc style" but were adopted by the group members.

On 1 February 2015 Lord Myners was appointed Chair of the Court of Governors and Council of the London School of Economics and Political Science, succeeding Peter Sutherland.

In 2016, Lord Myners took up role as University Chancellor of the University of Exeter from Baroness Benjamin.

In 2020 Lord Myners was active in seeking funding for the Stadium for Cornwall.

== Personal life and death ==
Myners was married twice, first to Tessa Stanford-Smith, a school teacher, from 1972 to 1993, and then to Alison Macleod, former chair of the Contemporary Art Society and trustee of The Royal Academy Development Trust. from 1995 to 2020. He had four daughters and a son through two marriages. He lived in London and had a cottage near Falmouth, Cornwall.

Myners died at Chelsea and Westminster Hospital in London, on 16 January 2022, aged 73, after a fall at home and then contracting COVID-19 during the COVID-19 pandemic in England.

== Awards ==
Myners was awarded a CBE in 2001. He also received an Honorary Doctorate in Law from the University of Exeter and was a visiting fellow at Nuffield College Oxford. He was also an Executive Fellow of London Business School.

In July 2010 he was elected chairman of the All Party Parliamentary Group on Corporate Governance and in November 2010 was admitted as an Honorary Fellow of the Association of Corporate Treasurers.

== See also ==
- Pensions Act 1995
- Politics in England
- Stewardship Code

Academic offices
Preceded by Floella Benjamin	Chancellor of the University of Exeter; 2016–2021	Succeeded by Michael Barber
