= 2018 British cabinet reshuffle =

UK cabinet reshuffle undertaken by Theresa May

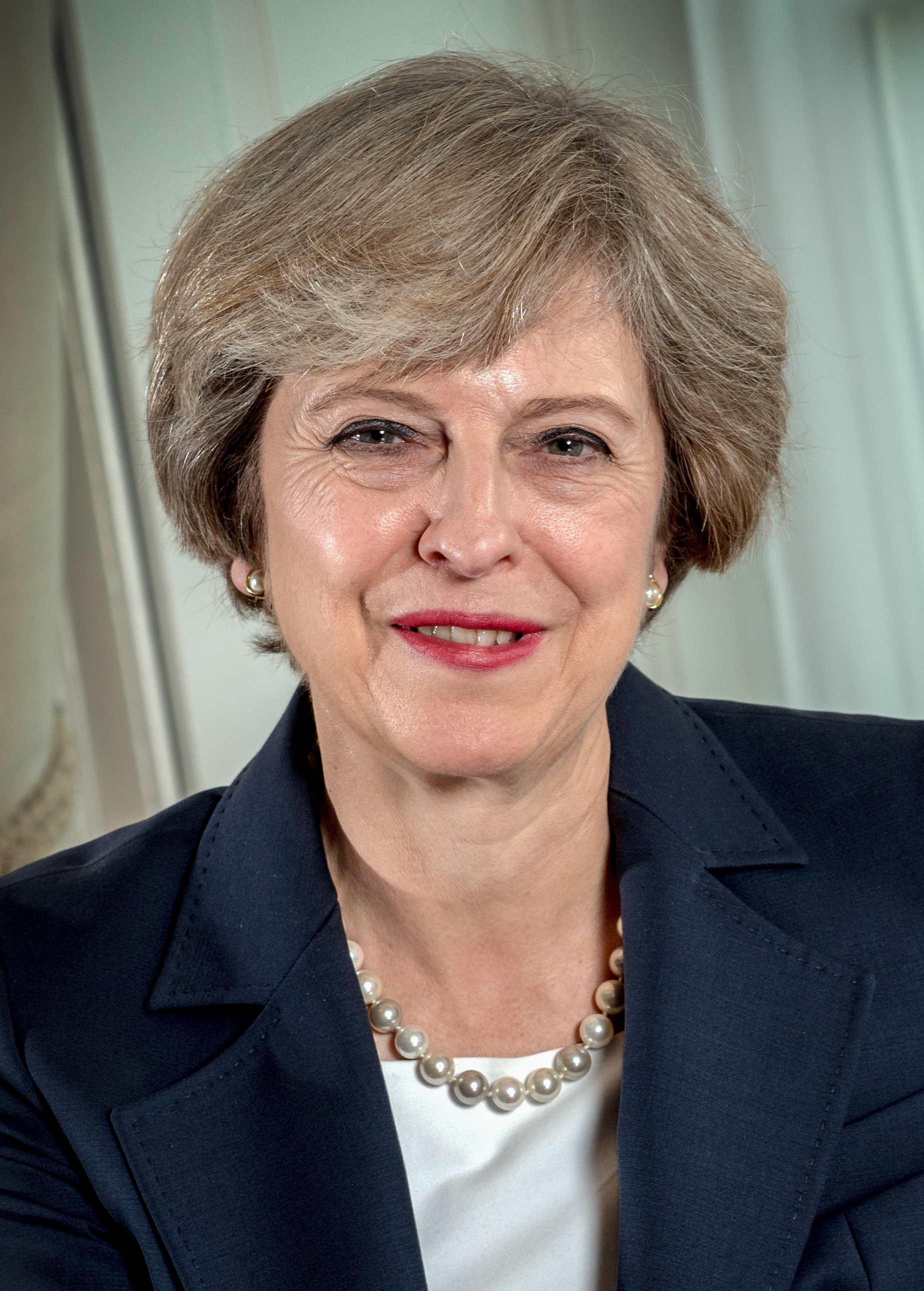
Theresa May

Theresa May carried out the first reshuffle of her minority government in January 2018. Following the resignation of her deputy, Damian Green as First Secretary of State in December 2017, the reshuffle had been highly anticipated and briefed in the press. There were reports of "up to a quarter" of her cabinet ministers who might lose their positions, including Boris Johnson, who had been seen to cause a number of political gaffes during his term as Foreign Secretary. The reshuffle was seen as an opportunity for May to reassert authority, greatly diminished following the result of the snap general election the previous year. Despite being described by 10 Downing Street as a chance to "refresh" the Cabinet, few changes were made to the ministerial line-up. On 9 January, newspaper headlines reflected the chaotic nature of May's reshuffle, with The Daily Telegraph describing it as, "The Night of the Blunt Stiletto", a reference to the 1962 reshuffle carried out by Harold Macmillan.

It was widely reported Jeremy Hunt was due to be moved from the Department for Health to become Secretary of State for Business, Energy and Industrial Strategy, but refused. Instead he defended his position as Health Secretary and convinced May to allow him to remain in post, and for "Social Care" to be added to the name of his department. After considerable speculation Justine Greening would lose her job as Education Secretary, she refused the offer of Secretary of State for Work and Pensions and chose instead to resign from the government.

== Cabinet-level changes ==
Colour key
- Joined the Cabinet
- Left the Cabinet
- Portfolio renamed

Minister	Position before reshuffle	Result of reshuffle
Rt Hon James Brokenshire MP	Secretary of State for Northern Ireland	Resigned from the Cabinet on the grounds of ill health
Rt Hon Sir Patrick McLoughlin MP	Chancellor of the Duchy of Lancaster (Chairman of the Conservative Party) (Note: Non-ministerial position)	Left the government
Rt Hon Brandon Lewis MP	Minister of State for Immigration	Became Minister without Portfolio
Rt Hon David Lidington CBE MP	Lord Chancellor; Secretary of State for Justice	Became Minister for the Cabinet Office and Chancellor of the Duchy of Lancaster; will deputise for the Prime Minister at PMQs
Rt Hon Sajid Javid MP	Secretary of State for Communities and Local Government	Became Secretary of State for Housing, Communities and Local Government
Rt Hon Jeremy Hunt MP	Secretary of State for Health	Became Secretary of State for Health and Social Care
Rt Hon David Gauke MP	Secretary of State for Work and Pensions	Became Lord Chancellor and Secretary of State for Justice
Rt Hon Karen Bradley MP	Secretary of State for Digital, Culture, Media and Sport	Became Secretary of State for Northern Ireland
Rt Hon Matt Hancock MP	Minister of State for Digital and Culture	Promoted to become Secretary of State for Digital, Culture, Media and Sport
Rt Hon Justine Greening MP	Secretary of State for Education; Minister for Women and Equalities	Resigned from the Cabinet after reportedly refusing to be moved to the Department for Work and Pensions from the Department for Education
Damian Hinds MP	Minister for Employment	Became Secretary of State for Education
Rt Hon Esther McVey MP	Deputy Chief Government Whip; Treasurer of the Household	Became Secretary of State for Work and Pensions
Claire Perry MP	Minister of State for Climate Change and Industry	Given right to attend Cabinet and appointed to the Privy Council
Caroline Nokes MP	Minister for Government Resilience and Efficiency	Became Minister of State for Immigration
Rt Hon Amber Rudd MP	Home Secretary	Continued as Home Secretary and given additional role of Minister for Women and Equalities.

== Junior ministerial changes ==
Colour key
- Promoted (Note: According to the ministerial pay scale: Parliamentary Private Secretary < Parliamentary Under-Secretary of State < Minister of State)
- Left the government

Minister	Position before reshuffle	Result of reshuffle
Alok Sharma MP	Minister of State for Housing and Planning	Became Minister for Employment
Dominic Raab MP	Minister of State for Courts and Justice	Became Minister of State for Housing and Planning
Rt Hon John Hayes CBE FRSA MP	Minister of State for Transport	Left the government
Jo Johnson MP	Minister of State for Universities and Science	Became Minister of State for Transport and Minister for London
Sam Gyimah MP	Parliamentary Under-Secretary of State for Prisons, Probation, Rehabilitation and Sentencing	Became Minister of State for Universities and Science
Philip Dunne MP	Minister of State for Health	Left the government
Caroline Dinenage MP	Parliamentary Under-Secretary of State for Family Support, Housing and Child Maintenance	Became Minister of State for Health and Social Care
Steve Barclay MP	Economic Secretary to the Treasury; City Minister	Became Minister of State for Health and Social Care
Rory Stewart MP	Minister of State for Africa; Minister of State for International Development	Became Minister of State for Courts and Justice
Margot James MP	Parliamentary Under-Secretary of State for Small Business, Consumers and Corporate Responsibility	Became Minister of State for Digital and Culture
Harriett Baldwin MP	Parliamentary Under-Secretary of State for Defence Procurement	Became Minister of State for Africa and Minister of State for International Development
Marcus Jones MP	Parliamentary Under-Secretary of State for Communities and Local Government	Left the government; appointed Vice Chairman of the Conservative Party
Rishi Sunak MP	Backbencher	Became Parliamentary Under-Secretary of State for Housing, Communities and Local Government
Lucy Frazer QC MP	Backbencher	Became Parliamentary Under-Secretary of State for Prisons, Probation, Rehabilitation and Sentencing
Chris Skidmore FRHistS FSA FRSA MP	Minister for the Constitution	Left the government; appointed Vice Chairman of the Conservative Party
Oliver Dowden CBE MP	Backbencher	Became Minister for Implementation
Kit Malthouse MP	Backbencher	Became Parliamentary Under-Secretary of State for Work and Pensions
Andrew Jones MP	Exchequer Secretary to the Treasury	Left the government; appointed Vice Chairman of the Conservative Party
Robert Jenrick MP	Parliamentary Private Secretary to the Home Secretary	Became Exchequer Secretary to the Treasury
Robert Goodwill MP	Minister of State for Children and Families	Left the government
Nadhim Zahawi MP	Backbencher	Became Parliamentary Under-Secretary of State for Education
Suella Fernandes MP	Parliamentary Private Secretary to HM Treasury Ministers	Became Parliamentary Under-Secretary of State for Exiting the European Union
Shailesh Vara MP	Backbencher	Became Parliamentary Under-Secretary of State for Northern Ireland
Nus Ghani MP	Backbencher	Became Parliamentary Under-Secretary of State for Transport
Michael Ellis MP	Deputy Leader of the House of Commons	Became Parliamentary Under-Secretary of State for Digital, Culture, Media and Sport
Andrew Griffiths MP	Lord Commissioner of HM Treasury	Became Parliamentary Under-Secretary of State for Business, Energy and Industrial Strategy
Heather Wheeler MP	Lord Commissioner of HM Treasury	Became Parliamentary Under-Secretary of State for Housing, Communities and Local Government
Chloe Smith MP	Parliamentary Under-Secretary of State for Northern Ireland	Became Parliamentary Under-Secretary for the Cabinet Office
Guto Bebb MP	Parliamentary Under-Secretary of State for Wales	Became Parliamentary Under-Secretary of State for Defence Procurement
John Glen MP	Parliamentary Under-Secretary for Arts, Heritage and Tourism	Became Economic Secretary to the Treasury and City Minister
Mark Garnier MP	Parliamentary Under-Secretary of State for International Trade	Left the government
Graham Stuart MP	Assistant Government Whip	Became Parliamentary Under-Secretary of State for International Trade
Stuart Andrew MP	Parliamentary Private Secretary to the Chancellor of the Duchy of Lancaster	Became Parliamentary Under-Secretary of State for Wales and an Assistant Government Whip

== Whips' Office appointments ==
Whip	New position
Chris Pincher MP	Deputy Chief Government Whip; Treasurer of the Household
Kelly Tolhurst MP	Assistant Government Whip
Mims Davies MP	Assistant Government Whip
Amanda Milling MP	Assistant Government Whip
Jo Churchill MP	Assistant Government Whip
Wendy Morton MP	Assistant Government Whip
Nus Ghani MP	Assistant Government Whip

== Conservative Party appointments ==
Appointee	Position before appointment	New party position
Rt Hon Brandon Lewis MP	Minister of State for Immigration	Conservative Party Chairman
James Cleverly TD MP	Parliamentary Private Secretary to the Minister of State for Immigration	Deputy Chairman of the Conservative Party
Chris Skidmore FRHistS FSA FRSA MP	Minister for the Constitution	Vice Chairman for Policy
Kemi Badenoch MP	Backbencher	Vice Chairman for Candidates
Ben Bradley MP	Backbencher	Vice Chairman for Youth
Maria Caulfield MP	Backbencher	Vice Chairman for Women
Rehman Chishti MP	Backbencher	Vice Chairman for Communities
Helen Grant MP	Backbencher	Vice Chairman for Communities
Andrew Jones MP	Exchequer Secretary to the Treasury	Vice Chairman for Business Engagement
Marcus Jones MP	Parliamentary Under-Secretary of State for Communities and Local Government	Vice Chairman for Local Government
James Morris MP	Backbencher	Vice Chairman for Training and Development

== Reaction ==
The reshuffle was widely considered a political failure, falling short of the expectation for a radical shake-up. The Guardian called it a "pointless luxury" that would cost the government, and Gary Gibbon of Channel 4 News noted it had revealed the Prime Minister's weakened position, naming the reshuffle the "Night of the Long Plastic Forks". Writing his editorial in the London Evening Standard, George Osborne credited May with orchestrating "the worst reshuffle in modern history".

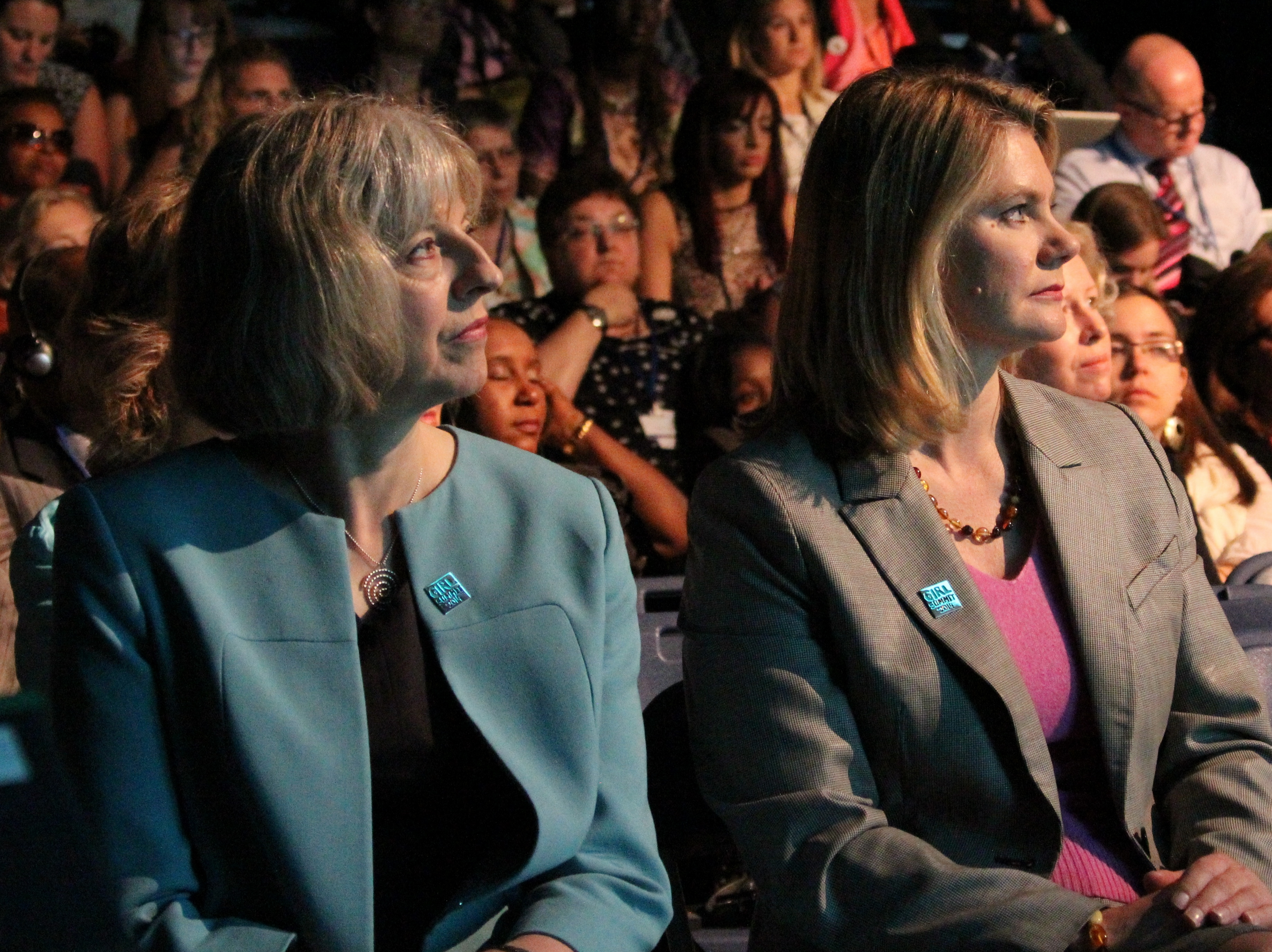
Theresa May (left) and Justine Greening (right) in 2014

=== Resignation of Justine Greening ===
Justine Greening was reported to have spent over three hours inside 10 Downing Street, discussing her political future with the Prime Minister. Despite being offered the position of Secretary of State for Work and Pensions, Greening refused to leave the Department for Education, describing it as being her "dream job". Soon after she emerged from Number 10, her formal resignation was announced and May expressed her disappointment at the decision. In a statement on Twitter, Greening wrote: "Social mobility matters to me & our country more than my ministerial career." – some thought this to be alluding to her criticism of May's grammar schools policy.

Many commentators wrote of their dismay at Greening's resignation. Melissa Benn, founder of the Local Schools Network, described her departure as "bad news for anyone who cares about education," and Stephen Bush wrote in the New Statesman that May's treatment of her Education Secretary "makes no sense at all". Bush reasoned Greening was a successful minister who did not deserve demotion to Work and Pensions, and her return to the backbench could add a vote to the bloc of anti-Brexit Tory MPs, given that she represented Putney, a heavily pro-Remain constituency. Ruth Davidson, leader of the Scottish Conservatives, praised Greening as "a real role model for LGBT+ Conservatives", and Labour MP Jonathan Reynolds tweeted that: "A Conservative Party which can find a role for Toby Young but not for Justine Greening is one that can be beaten." Faisal Islam of Sky News reported a number of Conservative MPs had privately expressed their anger at Greening's treatment, calling it a "dreadful error".

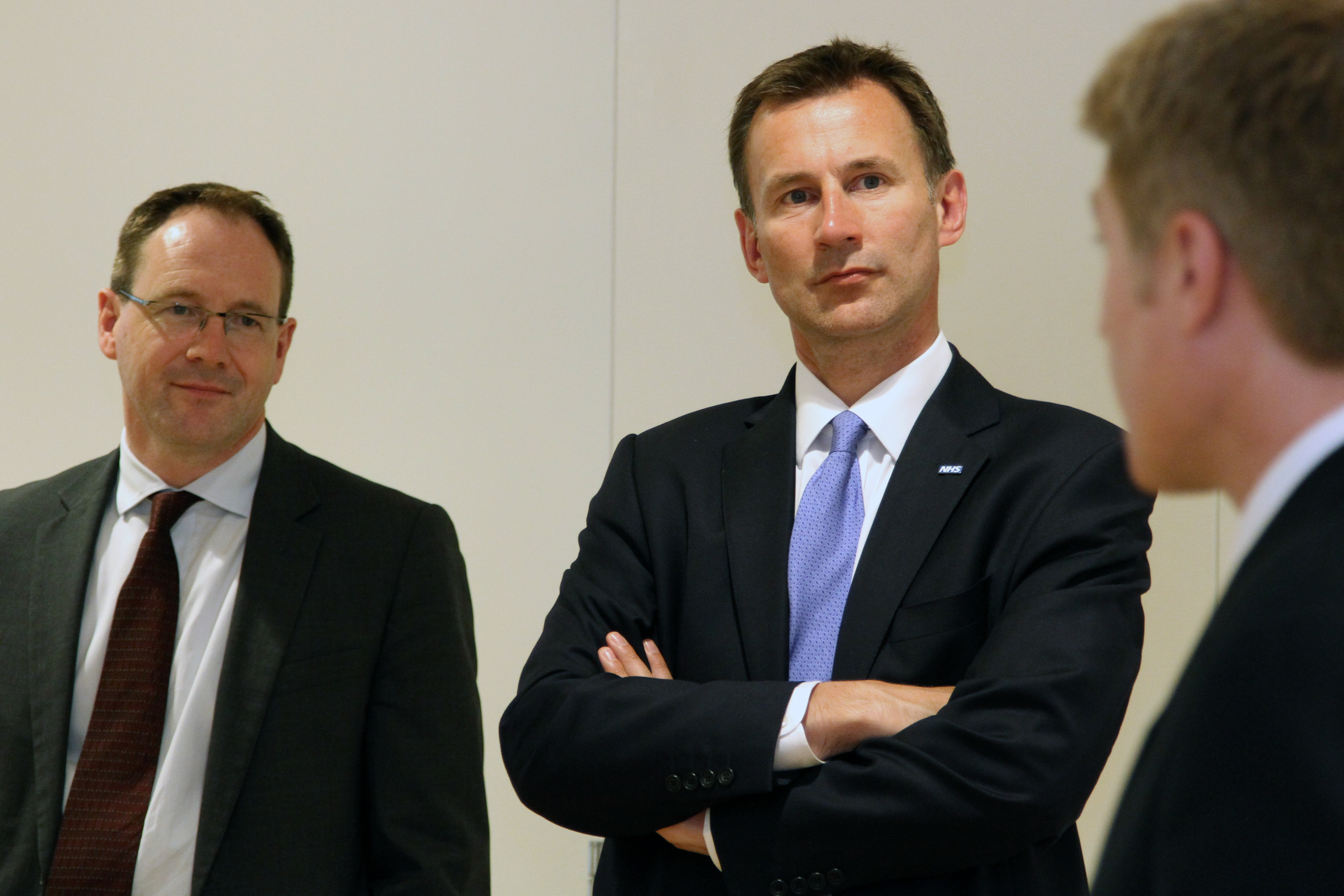
Jeremy Hunt during a trip to the US, in 2013

=== Failure to move Jeremy Hunt ===
Jeremy Hunt's meeting with the Prime Minister lasted over an hour, during which time Greg Clark, the Business Secretary, had arrived. Hunt and Clark were expected to swap jobs but Hunt refused, convincing Theresa May to allow him to stay at the Department and to widen his brief to include social care. May's willingness to accept Hunt's request was seen as a sign of her diminished authority, which she had hoped to improve by carrying out such a reshuffle.

Comparison were drawn between Hunt's success at persuading May to allow him to continue in his role, and Justine Greening's failure to do so. Anonymous Tory MPs were quoted as saying the Prime Minister had "caved into boys but not a woman", expanding the brief of a disloyal minister while forcing a loyal one to resign.

=== Renamed government departments ===
In the reshuffle, the Department of Health (DH) became the Department of Health and Social Care (DHSC), and the Department for Communities and Local Government (DCLG) became the Ministry of Housing, Communities and Local Government (MHCLG). It was stated by the government these changes had been made in order to reflect the government's renewed focus on housing and social care issues. Crisis, the national charity for single homeless people, tweeted its approval of the change, though others have criticised it as a rebranding exercise. It transpired the DH's name change only related to the department taking responsibility for the social care green paper that had been overseen by the Cabinet Office, rather than any representing any meaningful structural change. The Leader of the Opposition, Jeremy Corbyn, called rebranding the departments a "pointless and lacklustre PR exercise" that would not deliver real change. He stated: "You can’t make up for nearly eight years of failure by changing the name of a department."

=== Controversy over Maria Caulfield's appointment ===
The British Pregnancy Advisory Service tweeted a statement in the wake of Maria Caulfield's appointment as Vice Chairman of the Conservative Party for Women, saying they were "incredibly disappointed", due to her anti-abortion voting record. They referred specifically to her opposition to the Reproductive Health (Access to Terminations) Bill, a Ten Minute Rule bill put forward by Diana Johnson in March 2017, which proposed to end prosecutions against women who terminated their pregnancies without permission. Caulfield's appointment was also criticised by actor and activist Gillian Anderson and the leader of the Women's Equality Party, Sophie Walker, who stated: "Someone who believes (abortion rights) should be restricted can never advocate effectively for (women)."

=== Notable media gaffes ===
Even before any official announcement had been issued by Downing Street, there was criticism about the organisation and handling of the reshuffle. This narrative began with a tweet sent out by the Conservative Campaign Headquarters account, congratulating Chris Grayling on his appointment as Chairman of the Conservative Party. Although it was quickly deleted, the error soon caught the media's attention. Some mockingly suggested Grayling had broken the record for the shortest tenure as Party Chairman.

Jeremy Hunt 'liked' a tweet from Paul Staines, breaking the news of Justine Greening's resignation. Hunt swiftly apologised and insisted he had accidentally pressed the 'like' button, adding his admiration for Greening.

== See also ==
- Second May ministry
- Premiership of Theresa May
