= Peter Lloyd (politician) =

English politician (born 1937)

The Right Honourable Sir Peter Lloyd

Member of Parliament for Fareham
- In office 3 May 1979 – 14 May 2001
- Preceded by: Reginald Bennett
- Succeeded by: Mark Hoban

Personal details
- Born: 12 November 1937 (age 88)
- Party: Conservative

Sir Peter Robert Cable Lloyd (born 12 November 1937) is a retired English Conservative Party politician.

== Parliamentary career ==
Lloyd was educated at Tonbridge School and Pembroke College, Cambridge, and was formerly a marketing manager for United Biscuits.

He stood for the Nottingham West constituency in the February and October 1974 elections, being beaten by Labour's Michael English.

Lloyd was member of parliament for Fareham in the south of England from 1979 to 2001, when he retired and was succeeded by Mark Hoban.

His previous positions include: Minister of state, Home Office (1992–1994), Parliamentary Under Secretary of State, Home Office (1989–1992), Parliamentary Under-Secretary of State, Department of Social Security (1988–1989), Government whip (1984–1988), PPS to Sir Keith Joseph (1983–1984), PPS to Adam Butler (1981–1982).

Lloyd served on, amongst others, the Treasury Select Committee in the late 1990s.

== After Parliament ==
Lloyd is currently on the board of trustees for New Bridge an organisation founded in 1956 which aims to help prisoners stay in touch with society and later integrate back into it. He is also the President of the National Council for Independent Monitoring Boards, leading the monitoring of prisons and Immigration Removal Centres across England and Wales.

Parliament of the United Kingdom
Preceded by Reginald Bennett	Member of Parliament for Fareham; 1979–2001	Succeeded by Mark Hoban
