= List of business and trade associations of the United Kingdom =

This is a list of business and trade associations based in the United Kingdom. These organisations generally aim to promote and support their respective industries or professions, including advocacy, networking, professional development, and standards-setting.

== General Business Associations ==
- British Chambers of Commerce (BCC) - A national representative body for accredited Chambers of Commerce across the UK, supporting and lobbying on behalf of businesses of all sizes and sectors.
- Confederation of British Industry (CBI) - An organisation that speaks on behalf of 190,000 businesses, including 140 trade associations. It provides lobbying, advice, and networking opportunities.
- Federation of Small Businesses (FSB) - An organisation advocating for small businesses and the self-employed in the UK.
- Institute of Directors (IoD) - A UK-based organisation providing support and advocacy for directors and business leaders.
- Make UK (previously EEF) - Represents manufacturers and businesses in the engineering sector.
- British Retail Consortium (BRC) - The leading trade association for UK retail businesses.

== Industry-specific Associations ==
- Association of British Insurers (ABI) - Represents companies in the insurance sector.
- Confor: Confederation of Forest Industries (UK) - Represents the forestry and wood-using businesses in the UK, from nurseries and growers, to wood processing end-users.
- Construction Industry Council (CIC) - Represents professionals in the built environment sector
- CREST - Represents cyber service providers globally, a non-profit, member organisation
- Financial Services Skills Commission - Represents the financial services sector on skills
- Mineral Products Association - Represents the minerals and mineral products sector
- Oil & Gas UK (OGUK) - Represents the UK offshore oil and gas industry
- RenewableUK - Represents companies in the wind and marine energy industries
- The Publishers Association - Represents book, journal, audio and electronic publishers in the UK
- TechUK - Represents companies in the cyber technology sector
- UK Finance - The trade association for the UK banking and financial services sector

== Professional Associations ==
- Chartered Institute of Personnel and Development (CIPD) - The professional body for experts in people at work.
- The Chartered Institute of Marketing (CIM) - The world's leading professional marketing body.
- Chartered Institute of Management Accountants (CIMA) - The world's largest professional body of management accountants.
- The Royal Institution of Chartered Surveyors (RICS) - The world's leading professional body for qualifications and standards in land, property, infrastructure and construction.
