= Andrea Leadsom =

British politician (born 1963)

The Right Honourable Dame Andrea Leadsom DBE
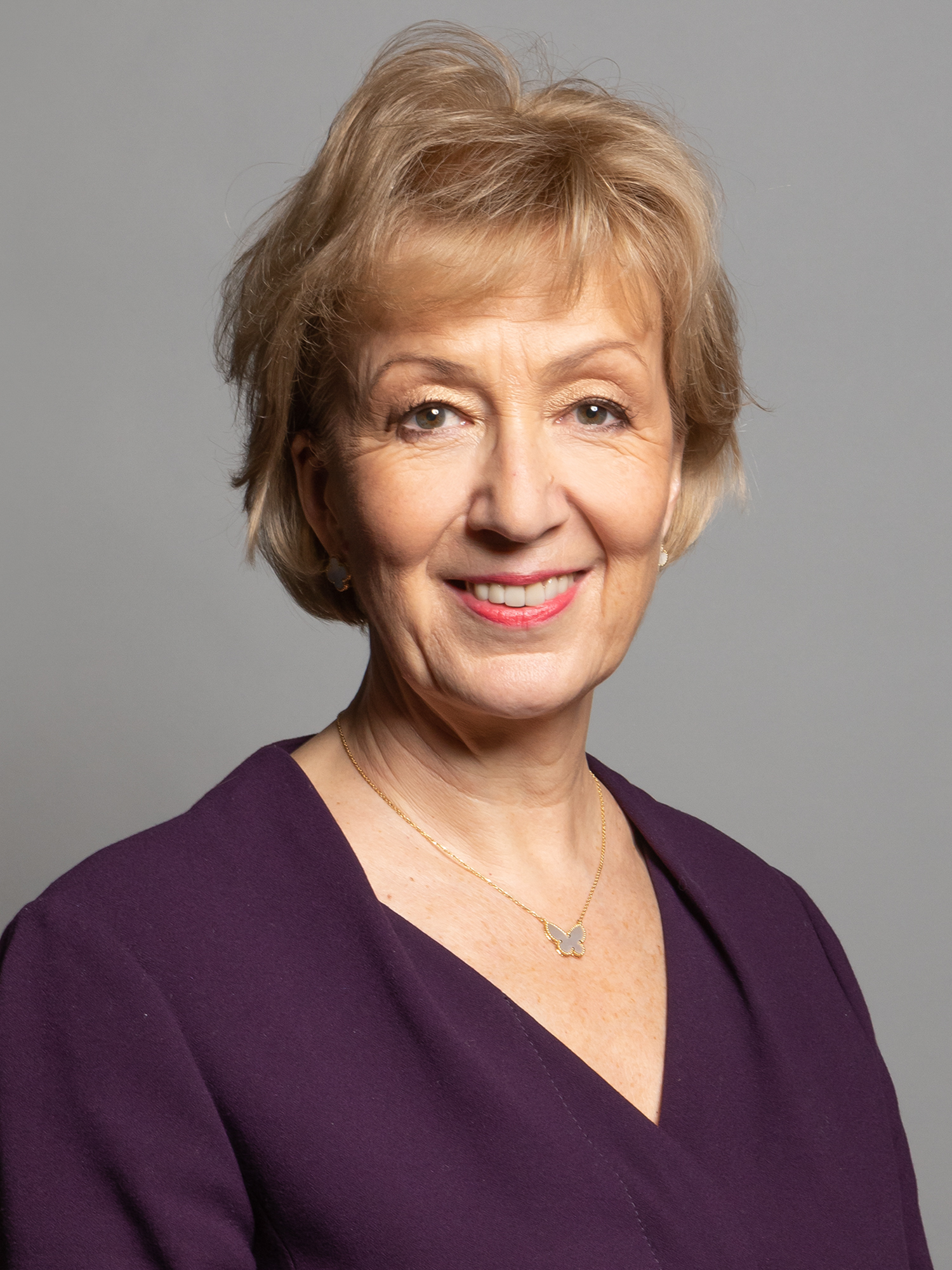
- Official portrait, 2020

Parliamentary Under-Secretary of State for Public Health, Start for Life and Primary Care
- In office 13 November 2023 – 5 July 2024
- Prime Minister: Rishi Sunak
- Preceded by: Neil O'Brien
- Succeeded by: Andrew Gwynne

Secretary of State for Business, Energy and Industrial Strategy
- In office 24 July 2019 – 13 February 2020
- Prime Minister: Boris Johnson
- Preceded by: Greg Clark
- Succeeded by: Alok Sharma

Leader of the House of Commons; Lord President of the Council
- In office 11 June 2017 – 22 May 2019
- Prime Minister: Theresa May
- Preceded by: David Lidington
- Succeeded by: Mel Stride

Secretary of State for Environment, Food and Rural Affairs
- In office 14 July 2016 – 11 June 2017
- Prime Minister: Theresa May
- Preceded by: Liz Truss
- Succeeded by: Michael Gove

Minister of State for Energy
- In office 11 May 2015 – 14 July 2016
- Prime Minister: David Cameron
- Preceded by: Matt Hancock
- Succeeded by: The Baroness Neville-Rolfe

Economic Secretary to the Treasury City Minister
- In office 9 April 2014 – 11 May 2015
- Prime Minister: David Cameron
- Preceded by: Nicky Morgan (as Economic Secretary); Sajid Javid (as City Minister)
- Succeeded by: Harriett Baldwin

Member of Parliament; for South Northamptonshire
- In office 6 May 2010 – 30 May 2024
- Preceded by: Constituency established
- Succeeded by: Sarah Bool

Personal details
- Born: Andrea Jacqueline Salmon; 13 May 1963 (age 63) Aylesbury, Buckinghamshire, England
- Party: Conservative
- Spouse: Ben Leadsom (m. 1993)
- Children: 3
- Education: University of Warwick (BA)

Dame Andrea Jacqueline Leadsom (/ˈlɛdsəm/; née Salmon; born 13 May 1963) is a British politician who served in various ministerial positions under Prime Ministers David Cameron, Theresa May, Boris Johnson and Rishi Sunak between 2014 and 2024. A member of the Conservative Party, she was the Member of Parliament (MP) for South Northamptonshire from 2010 to 2024. Leadsom served in the Cabinet as Secretary of State for Environment, Food and Rural Affairs from 2016 to 2017, Leader of the House of Commons from 2017 to 2019 and Secretary of State for Business, Energy and Industrial Strategy from 2019 to 2020. She has twice stood to become Leader of the Conservative Party, in 2016 and 2019.

Leadsom was born in Aylesbury, Buckinghamshire, in 1963. After graduating with a degree in political science at the University of Warwick, she began a career in finance including working as Institutional Banking Director at Barclays, and later as Senior Investment Officer and Head of Corporate Governance at Invesco Perpetual. She was elected to the House of Commons at the 2010 general election. She served as Economic Secretary to the Treasury and City Minister from 2014 to 2015 and Minister of State for Energy from 2015 to 2016. Leadsom was a prominent member of the Leave campaign during the 2016 referendum on EU membership, with some claiming that she had impressed in TV debates.

Upon David Cameron's resignation, Leadsom became one of five candidates in the 2016 Conservative Party leadership election. In the second round of voting by MPs, she came second to Theresa May. She withdrew before Tory members could elect either. May appointed Leadsom as Secretary of State for Environment, Food and Rural Affairs, in which position she served from 2016 to 2017. Following the snap 2017 general election, Leadsom was appointed Leader of the House of Commons and Lord President of the Council. On 22 May 2019, she resigned in protest at May's Brexit strategy. Two days later, May announced her resignation as party leader, taking effect on 7 June. Leadsom stood as a candidate to succeed May as leader of the Conservative Party in June 2019 but was eliminated in the first round of voting, finishing 8th out of 10 candidates with 11 votes.

Upon the appointment of Boris Johnson as prime minister, Leadsom was appointed Secretary of State for Business, Energy and Industrial Strategy. She left the Cabinet in the 2020 cabinet reshuffle and remained in the House of Commons as a backbencher, until 2023 when she returned to the frontbench as Parliamentary Under-Secretary of State for Public Health, Start for Life and Primary Care under Prime Minister Rishi Sunak. Leadsom did not seek re-election as an MP at the 2024 general election.

== Early life and financial career ==
Andrea Salmon was born on 13 May 1963 in Aylesbury, Buckinghamshire, the daughter of Richard and Judy Salmon (née Kitchin). She attended Tonbridge Girls' Grammar School, before studying political science at the University of Warwick. When she was young Leadsom stacked shelves in Sainsbury's and also worked as a waitress.

After graduation, Leadsom began a career in the financial sector as a debt trader for Barclays de Zoete Wedd, the-then investment bank division of Barclays Bank.

Leadsom served as Barclays' Deputy Director in the Financial Institutions team from 1993. In this role, she said she was given a "ringside seat" in the collapse of Barings Bank. She clashed with the head of Barclays Investments who tried to persuade her to return to full-time work soon after a pregnancy, and she left the company in 1997.

From 1997 to 1999, Leadsom served as managing director of De Putron Fund Management (DPFM). In 1998 she was promoted to board director for marketing.

Leadsom was Head of Corporate Governance and a Senior Investment Officer at Invesco Perpetual from 1999 to 2009. Her role was to work on "special projects", mostly for the Chief Investment Officer, which included negotiating pay terms for senior fund managers. Towards the end of her time, she advised on a number of governance issues, but she had no-one reporting to her in either role.

Leadsom was a Conservative Party councillor on South Oxfordshire District Council between 2003 and 2007.

At the 2005 general election, Leadsom stood in Knowsley South, coming third with 12.3% of the vote behind the incumbent Labour MP Eddie O'Hara and the Liberal Democrat candidate. She was subsequently placed on the Conservative A-List.

== Political career ==
=== Early parliamentary career (2010–2013) ===
Leadsom was selected as the prospective parliamentary candidate in South Northamptonshire in June 2006. At the 2010 general election, Leadsom was elected as MP for South Northamptonshire with 55.2% of the vote and a majority of 20,478. On entering the House of Commons she was elected as a member of the Treasury Select Committee. She made her maiden speech on 22 June 2010, when she spoke of restoring health to the financial sector, drawing from personal experience in financial regulation, particularly with Barings Bank.

In September 2011, she co-founded the Fresh Start Project with fellow Conservative MPs Chris Heaton-Harris and George Eustice to "research and build support for realistic and far-reaching proposals for reforming the EU". On 25 October 2011, Leadsom was one of 81 Conservative MPs to defy the party whip and vote in favour of holding a referendum on the UK's membership of the European Union. This led to a sharp ruction with the Chancellor of the Exchequer, George Osborne, at the time, which she denies. In May 2012 she advocated for the removal of minimum wage, maternity leave, unfair dismissal legislation and pensions from British workers.

In July 2012, during the Libor scandal, she was widely reported on for her contribution to the Treasury Select Committee's questioning of Bob Diamond. At a subsequent hearing she questioned Paul Tucker, who stated that the previous government had not conspired with the Bank of England to fix rates. In a BBC interview, Leadsom stated that the suggestion "has now been completely squashed by Paul Tucker", and that on that specific point, George Osborne might want to apologise to Shadow Chancellor Ed Balls for "suggesting he was implicated in rate fixing". She also pointed out that Balls "still [had] a huge amount to answer for in relation to the scandal and his time in office". Mike Smithson suggested this could be a reason for Osborne to overlook her for a promotion in the 2012 cabinet reshuffle, despite the fact that "in terms of talent she must be right at the top of the list of 2010 newbies who should be promoted".

Leadsom was one of five MPs to abstain from the Marriage (Same Sex Couples) Bill by voting in both lobbies. Leadsom had earlier said she found the wording of the legislation "unacceptable", and that voting no reflected the views of "so many" of her constituents, who felt that the bill was "deeply wrong", but ultimately chose to abstain, saying, "I find myself genuinely torn...I cannot vote against a measure that would mean so much to the minority of homosexual couples for whom marriage is the ultimate recognition for their genuine feelings for each other. Yet nor can I vote for a measure that risks centuries of faith-based belief in marriage". During her Conservative Party leadership campaign in 2016, she stated she would have preferred a situation in which there were two types of services. Following the vote, Leadsom stated, "I would like to make clear that I fully support the lifelong commitment that is made between any loving couple and that I believe the legal basis of a same sex marriage should be no different to that of a heterosexual couple".

In April 2013 at the Hansard Society's annual parliamentary affairs lecture, Leadsom warned against the UK leaving the European Union, stating that "I think it would be a disaster for our economy and it would lead to a decade of economic and political uncertainty at a time when the tectonic plates of global success are moving."

In October 2013, Leadsom was appointed by David Cameron to the Number 10 Policy Unit, with responsibility for part of the public services brief.

=== Economic Secretary to the Treasury (2014–2015) ===
On 9 April 2014 Leadsom was appointed Economic Secretary to the Treasury following Maria Miller's resignation. She was also given the additional responsibility of City Minister, a post which had previously been held concurrently with the position of Financial Secretary to the Treasury.

Leadsom was instrumental in introducing the UK Government's first Islamic bonds, the Sukuk. This was the first Islamic bond listed outside the Islamic world. Leadsom stated "the strong demand for the Sukuk not only delivers good value for money for the taxpayer, but also cements Britain's position as the western hub of Islamic finance and is a part of our long term economic plan to make Britain the undisputed centre of the global financial system."

According to a 2016 report in the Financial Times, her period as City Minister was described by an anonymous Treasury official as "a disaster". Another anonymous official said: "She found it difficult to understand issues or take decisions. She was monomaniacal, seeing the EU as the source of every problem. She alienated officials by continually complaining about poor drafting."

==== Donations from family firm ====
In July 2014, The Independent revealed that Leadsom had received a series of donations totalling £70,000 to pay for printing and research costs for the company FSP over the course of three years. The company is owned by her brother in law, whose family is based in the British Virgin Islands. Leadsom's husband Ben was a director of the firm which made the donations, which were used to pay the salaries of staff in Leadsom's Westminster office after her election as MP; the firm has also made donations of £816,000 to the Conservative party.

The firm making the donations, Gloucester Research, was based in London and therefore the donations conformed to the rule banning political donations from abroad. The Labour MP Tom Watson said: "These very large donations might be within the rules, but it certainly isn't right that a Treasury minister has been taking money in this way. Most reasonable people will see this as completely unreasonable."

=== Minister of State for Energy (2015–2016) ===
At the 2015 general election, Leadsom was re-elected as MP for South Northamptonshire with an increased vote share of 60.1% and an increased majority of 26,416. After the general election, Leadsom, was appointed Minister of State at the Department of Energy and Climate Change, reporting to Amber Rudd who was promoted to Secretary of State at the same department.

In June 2015 Leadsom announced the end of taxpayer funded subsidies for onshore wind farms, stating "we now have enough onshore wind in the pipeline to be sufficient to meet our renewable electricity aims". This was a year earlier than was originally planned and was in line with the Conservative Party Manifesto.

Before becoming Minister at the Department of Energy and Climate Change, Leadsom had opposed wind farms and EU renewable energy targets. After her appointment she said "When I first came to this job one of my two questions was: 'Is climate change real?' and the other was 'Is hydraulic fracturing ["fracking"] safe?' And on both of those questions I am now completely persuaded."

As Minister, Leadsom launched the consultation to ban microbeads, being personally opposed to them, stating "Most people would be dismayed to know the face scrub or toothpaste they use was causing irreversible damage to the environment, with billions of indigestible plastic pieces poisoning sea creatures. Adding plastic to products like face washes and body scrubs is wholly unnecessary when harmless alternatives can be used."

=== European Union membership referendum (2016) ===
Leadsom took a prominent role in the campaign to leave the EU. She argued that the Governor of the Bank of England, Mark Carney, had destabilised financial markets and jeopardised the Bank's independence by warning of short-term negative effects on the economy caused by leaving the EU.

In a televised debate on the referendum, Leadsom appeared on the "Leave" panel, along with Gisela Stuart and Boris Johnson. She disputed claims that the UK should pursue single market membership, saying that 80% of the world's economy, and most EU free-trade deals, are not within the single market. She also said that the UK economy is too large to need the single market, but is hindered by the slowness of EU trade procedures.

=== Conservative Party leadership candidate (2016) ===
Immediately following the result of the Brexit referendum, David Cameron announced that he would resign as leader of the Conservative Party and prime minister. Leadsom was one of the early favourites to become the next prime minister, and was also linked with a possible role as Chancellor. On 30 June 2016, she announced her candidacy to become leader of the Conservative Party. Leadsom said she would trigger Article 50 immediately upon becoming prime minister, and conduct swift negotiations with the European Union.

In the first round of voting on 5 July 2016, Theresa May received support from 165 MPs, with Leadsom coming second with 66 votes. In the second ballot, Leadsom came second with 84 votes. Michael Gove was eliminated with 46 votes. Theresa May received 199 votes. On 11 July 2016, Leadsom announced she would be withdrawing her leadership bid, leaving Theresa May as the successor to David Cameron.

==== Interviews ====
In a BBC interview on 7 July 2016, Leadsom spoke of her disappointment about plotting in the leadership race, including alleged attempts by opponents to block her from the final ballot. She dismissed as "ridiculous" accusations that her biography was misleading, saying that her "incredibly varied" CV is "all absolutely true".

Leadsom promised to "banish the pessimists" and to provide prosperity for the UK if elected, and stated that she was committed to fair trade. She also stated that she would review the Hunting Act with a focus on animal welfare if elected, and was asked about her concerns over the legislation passed to introduce same sex marriage.

==== Alleged exaggeration of pre-government jobs and responsibilities ====
On 6 July 2016, The Times and other news media published articles which said that Leadsom had overstated her private sector experience and responsibilities. They said that despite references her supporters had made to her managing "billions of pounds in funds" and her impressive-sounding job titles, she had held financial services regulator approval for only a brief three-month period in 10 years at Invesco Perpetual, and quoted former colleagues who said that she had exaggerated her level of involvement and her management responsibilities. Bob Yerbury, former Chief Investment Officer at Invesco Perpetual and Leadsom's former manager, dismissed the controversy about how she described her time there and described her as "totally honest".

Penny Mordaunt, a Leadsom supporter, described the reports as "a concerted effort to rubbish a stellar career". Leadsom then issued an amended CV, which The Guardian said listed both deputy financial institutions director, and financial institutions director roles at Barclays. Leadsom defended her CV in a BBC interview, saying claims of it being exaggerated were "ridiculous". "I have not changed my CV," she said. "I was always very clear; I was senior investment officer working very closely with the chief investment officer. I have been very clear; I'm not a funds manager." According to FSA records she was authorised to manage money for only three months.

==== Comments about motherhood ====
Leadsom's comments in an interview with The Times were interpreted as hinting that her being a mother meant that she was a better choice for Prime Minister than May, who has not been able to have children for health reasons, because it meant that she had "a very real stake" in the future. She said that she "did not want this to be 'Andrea has children, Theresa hasn't' because I think that would be really horrible". After The Times published the story, with the headline "Being a mother gives me an edge on May", Leadsom said that she was "disgusted" by the article, which was the "exact opposite of what I said".

The Times later released a partial transcript of the comments, and when Leadsom supporter Penny Mordaunt said that it was trying to "smear" Leadsom, The Times released an audio recording. Leadsom's comments were widely criticised; with fellow Conservative MPs including Sarah Wollaston and Anna Soubry suggested that the remarks showed she lacked the judgement to be Prime Minister, and called upon her to withdraw. Alan Duncan MP described her remarks as "vile".

==== Questions over financial affairs ====
Leadsom promised to publish her tax returns when she made it to the final ballot of the leadership election. Three days later she published "one year of tax information after rival Theresa May released four years' worth of tax returns". Richard Murphy, director of Tax Research UK, a tax campaign group, said "This isn't her tax return, it's a tax computation...It's a summary of numerical information but not an explanation of where it came from or what tax is due. It excludes all the information that might be of interest, so she has not published her tax return.”

==== "Black ops" allegation ====
Former conservative leader Iain Duncan Smith alleged that the intensity and nature of the sniping at Leadsom revealed ulterior motives, unconnected to her fitness for the post, saying to journalist Robert Peston that they indicated "a kind of real 'black-ops' operation to denigrate her reputation", writing later it constituted a "concerted and brutal attempt to destroy her character". Allison Pearson in The Sunday Telegraph wrote, "I have no doubt whatsoever that Leadsom became the target of a brutal and sustained character assassination." The next day she wrote, "Andrea Leadsom has nothing to be ashamed of: her conscience is clear. Those who sought to destroy her should examine theirs, if they can find it." Norman Tebbit described the efforts to remove her candidature as an intense smear campaign, saying that he suspected they may have arisen from her opposition to gay marriage as much as her Euroscepticism.

==== Withdrawal ====
On 11 July 2016 Leadsom withdrew from the Conservative leadership election, stating that she did not have enough support for her cause, with only a quarter of the votes from the parliamentary party. The previous day The Sunday Times had reported a rumour that up to 20 Tory MPs would quit the party if Leadsom won the leadership contest; this was later supported by reports in other news media but "denied by MPs" according to The Guardian.

In her statement Leadsom said: "the interests of our country are best served by the immediate appointment of a strong and well-supported prime minister. I am therefore withdrawing from the leadership election, and I wish Mrs May the very greatest success." Her campaign manager, Tim Loughton MP, spoke about an "onslaught of often very personal attacks from colleagues and journalists" as well as "underhand tactics against decent people".

In her resignation statement she thanked the 84 MPs who had supported her, conceding that "this is less than 25% of the parliamentary party and ... I do not believe this is sufficient support to win a strong and stable government should I win the leadership election". After her appointment as a Cabinet minister, other comments that Leadsom had made during the leadership race came to light and also led to criticism. During the 6 July 2016 interview with The Times, she had stated that men were more likely to be paedophiles than women, and hence were not suitable to be hired for jobs in daycare.

=== Secretary of State for Environment, Food and Rural Affairs (2016–2017) ===
On 14 July 2016, following Theresa May's election as Leader of the Conservative Party, and the formation of the first May ministry, Leadsom was appointed to the cabinet as Secretary of State for Environment, Food and Rural Affairs.

In April 2017, following the announcement of the general election in June, Leadsom delayed a report of illegally high levels of diesel pollution affecting over half the population until after the election. Constitutional experts Jo Murkens and Colin Talbot agreed it was a health issue and therefore not affected by the election and the government was instructed to appear in the high court to explain the delay.

In her role as head of the Department for Environment, Food and Rural Affairs, Leadsom stated she was "personally deeply committed to the importance of ensuring clean air".

On the anniversary of the Brexit vote, Leadsom was invited to discuss progress on Newsnight and said that the government had made "a good start". While being interviewed by Emily Maitlis, Leadsom suggested broadcasters should be "a little more patriotic". Tim Farron described her remarks as "a sinister threat to the free media", a comment echoed by Hugo Rifkind in The Times, whilst Peston on Sunday mockingly displayed his patriotism by decorating the studio with Union Jacks.

=== Leader of the House of Commons (2017–2019) ===
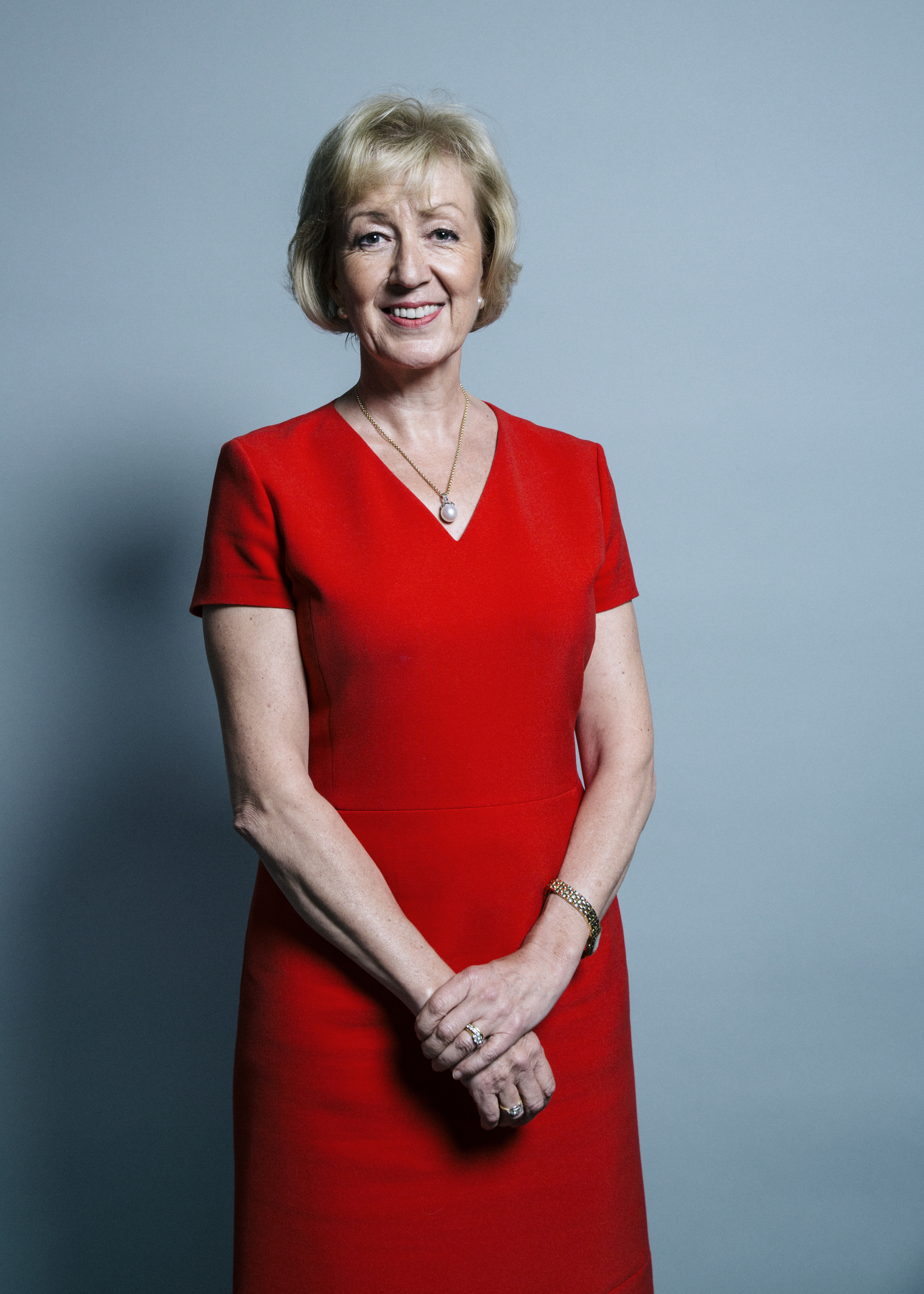
Leadsom's official parliamentary portrait after being re-elected at the 2017 general election

At the snap 2017 general election, Leadsom was again re-elected, with an increased vote share of 62.5% and a decreased majority of 22,840. After the election, on 11 June 2017, Leadsom was appointed Leader of the House of Commons and Lord President of the Council.

In July 2017, while attempting to eulogise Jane Austen, who was about to feature on the new £10 note scheduled to go into circulation in September, Leadsom told the House of Commons: "I would just add one other great lady to that lovely list, who I am delighted to join in celebrating, and that's that of Jane Austen, who will feature on the new £10 note, which I think is one of our greatest living authors." Amid laughs from both benches, she corrected herself, adding: "Greatest ever authors, and I think it's fantastic that at last we are starting to recognise – well I think many of us probably wish she were still living – but I absolutely share the sentiment."

On 19 July 2018, Leadsom proposed, as an amendment to the Independent Complaints and Grievance Policy, that the identity of any MP under investigation by the commissioner for standards should be kept confidential.

On 14 January 2019, Leadsom was criticised in the House of Commons by the Speaker of the House, John Bercow for the failure of the government to advance the cause of proxy voting for expectant mothers. The issue came to a head due to the imminent caesarean section delivery by Tulip Siddiq at the time of the rescheduled meaningful vote on 15 January 2019.

On 31 January 2019, Leadsom said the House of Commons' February recess from 15 to 24 February would be cancelled to free up time to pass the necessary Brexit-related legislation. Earlier in the day, her cabinet colleague Jeremy Hunt raised the possibility of Brexit being delayed with a technical extension to Article 50. The Times reported that senior Government ministers feared that it was already too late to meet the Brexit deadline of 29 March, and that Conservative MPs had been told that a one-line whip was expected to be imposed on votes in the Commons during the week of 18–22 February.

On 8 May 2019, Leadsom stated she was "seriously considering" a bid for the party leadership. Leadsom resigned as Leader of the House of Commons on 22 May, the eve of the European elections, as a result of Theresa May's most recent Brexit proposals, including the offer of votes in the House of Commons on a customs union and a second referendum.

=== Conservative Party leadership candidate (2019) ===
Leadsom officially announced her candidacy for the party leadership on 25 May 2019, the same day that Matt Hancock and Dominic Raab also announced they were standing as leadership candidates. She was eliminated from the contest in the first ballot, on 13 June 2019, and came overall in eighth place out of ten candidates.

=== Secretary of State for Business, Energy and Industrial Strategy (2019–2020) ===
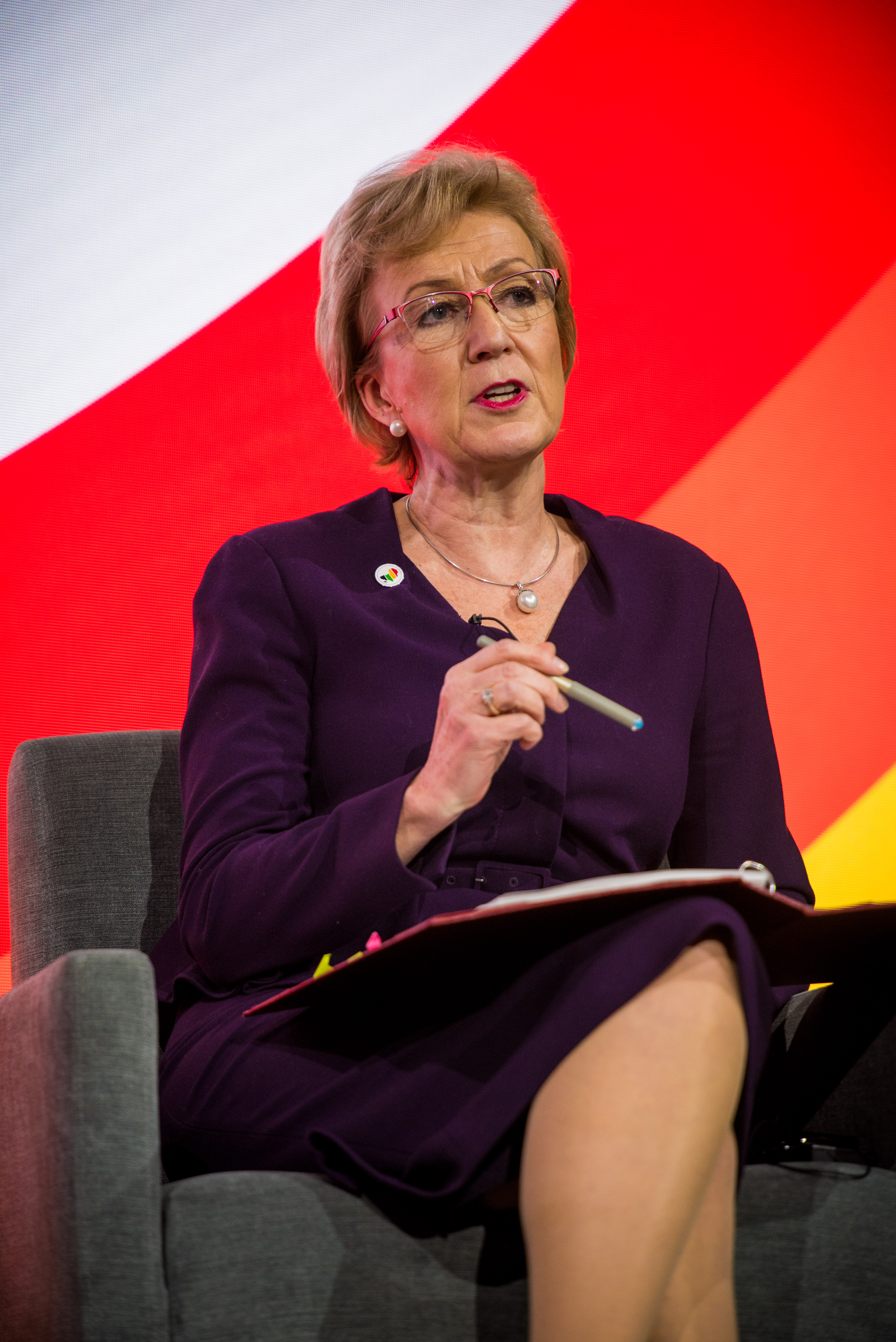
Leadsom, as Secretary of State for Business, Energy and Industrial Strategy, speaking at a UK-Africa Investment Summit in 2020

On 24 July 2019, following Boris Johnson's election as Leader of the Conservative Party, and the formation of the first Johnson ministry, Leadsom was appointed Secretary of State for Business, Energy and Industrial Strategy.

On 19 October, she said she was subject to "frightening abuse" from anti-Brexit demonstrators whilst leaving the Palace of Westminster. Jacob Rees-Mogg and Michael Gove were also targeted as they left following a House of Commons sitting. Leadsom was given a police escort through crowds gathered for a People's Vote rally, who were protesting for a further public vote on Brexit.

At the 2019 general election, Leadsom was again re-elected, with a decreased vote share of 62.4% and an increased majority of 27,761.

In May 2020 the environmental law charity ClientEarth unsuccessfully sued the UK Government after Leadsom approved proposals for the expansion of the gas-fired Drax Power Station in Yorkshire. According to the charity, the power station could produce 75% of the UK's energy sector emissions when fully operational and would become the largest gas-fired power station in Europe.

On 13 February 2020, Leadsom was dismissed as Business Secretary by Boris Johnson in the first cabinet reshuffle of the second Johnson ministry.

=== Later backbench career (2020–2023) ===
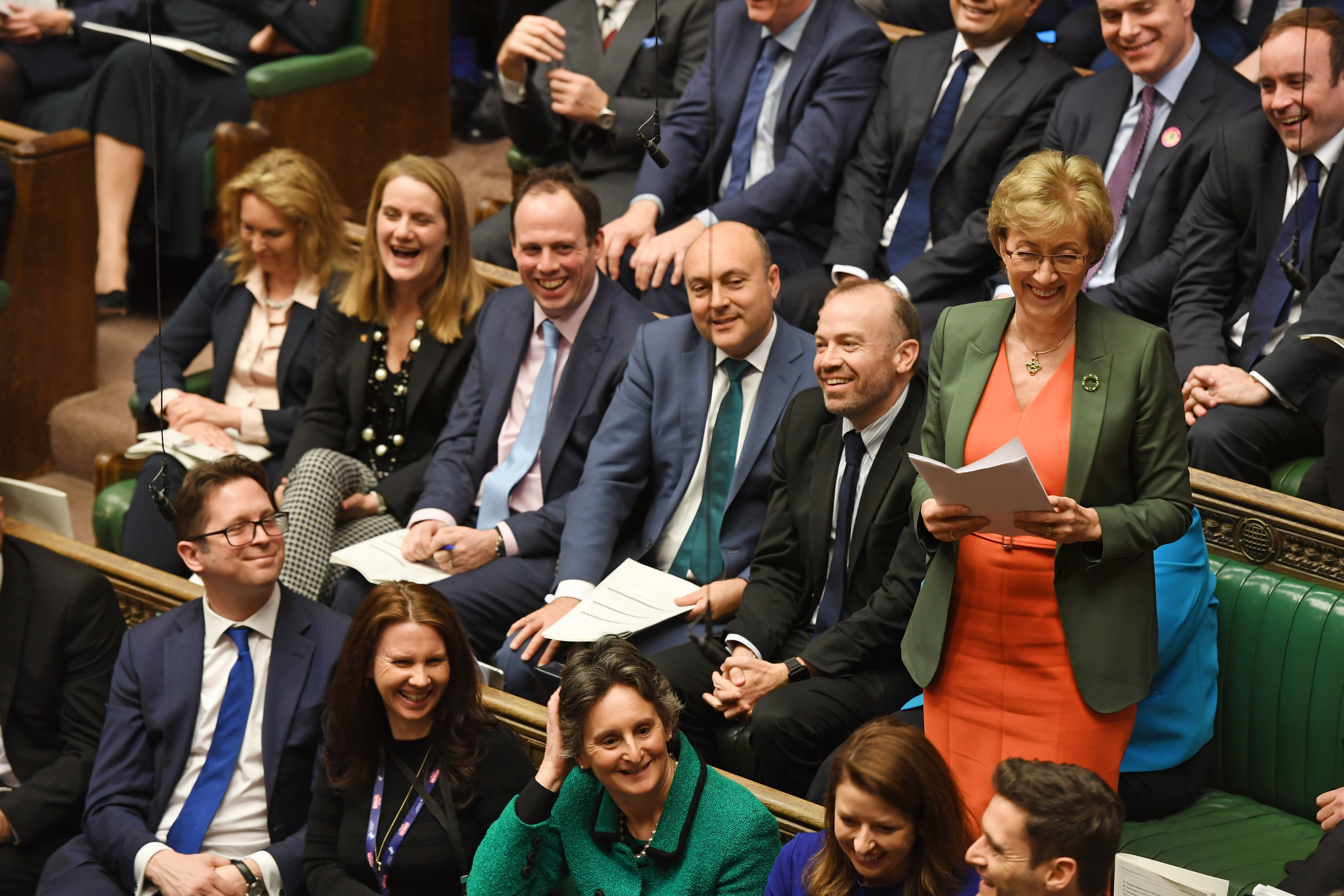
Leadsom makes her ministerial resignation statement, 4 March 2020

On 3 November 2021, Leadsom tabled an amendment to scrap the suspension of Owen Paterson for 30 days due to a breach of Commons advocacy rules regarding lobbying as part of his second jobs. Prime Minister Boris Johnson then ordered a three-line whip of his MPs to ensure the motion was passed 250 votes to 232. The next day this decision was "u-turned" by the government over a backlash.

In July 2022, Leadsom announced support for Penny Mordaunt in the Conservative Party leadership election and served as Mordaunt's campaign manager. After Mordaunt was eliminated, she endorsed Liz Truss. Following Truss's resignation as prime minister on 20 October, she once again supported Mordaunt for leader as a "unifying candidate".

=== Return to the frontbench and departure from politics (2023–2024) ===
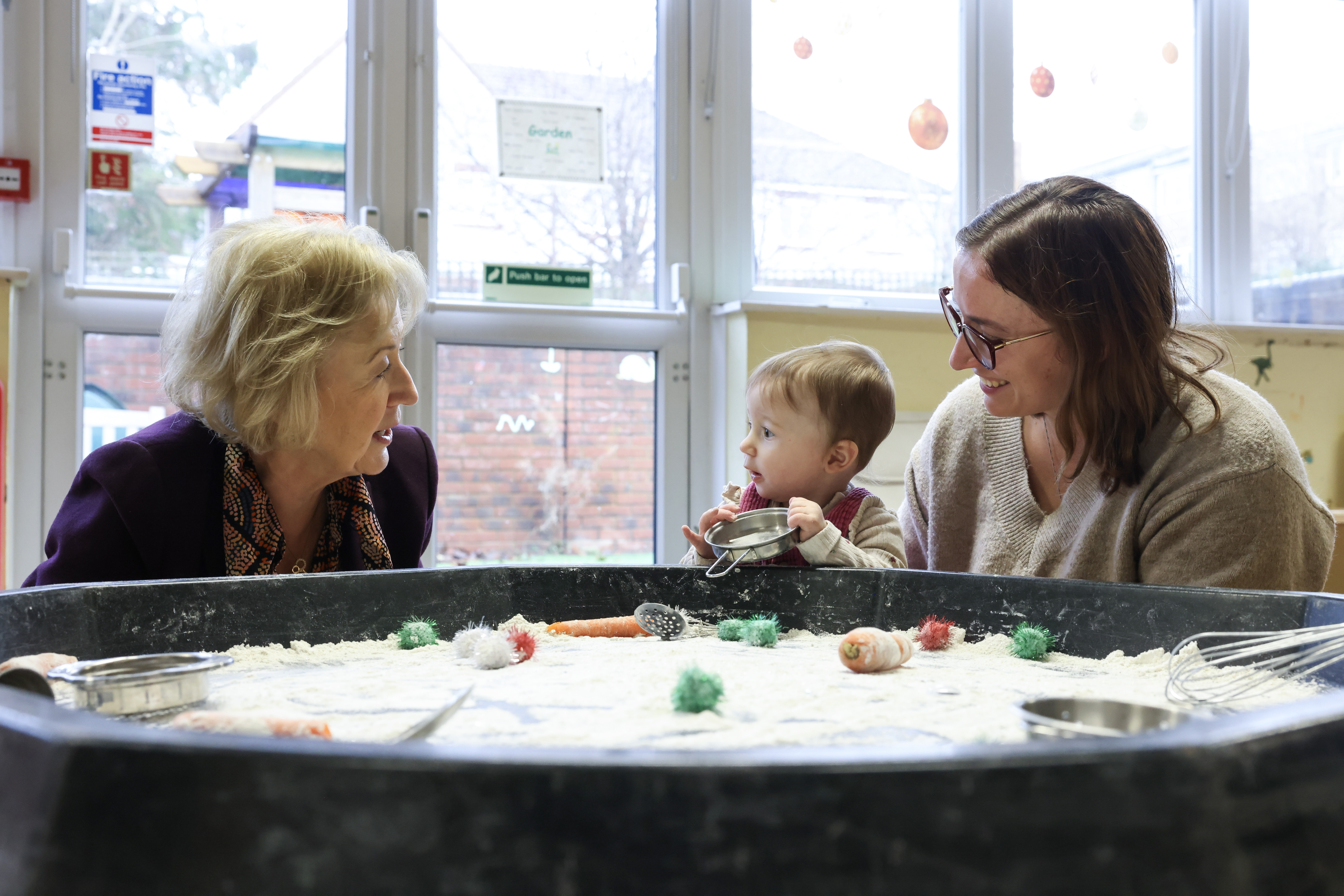
Leadsom, as the Parliamentary Under-Secretary of State for Primary Care, Start for Life and Public Health, visits a Children's Centre in Dunstable, in 2023

In the November 2023 British cabinet reshuffle, Leadsom returned to the frontbench as Parliamentary Under-Secretary of State for Primary Care, Start for Life and Public Health.

On 24 May 2024, Leadsom announced that she would not seek re-election at the 2024 general election.

== Career after politics ==
After leaving parliament, Leadsom founded the 1001 Critical Days Foundation, a charity focused on wellbeing of babies.

== Personal life ==
Leadsom married business manager Ben Leadsom in 1993, and the couple have two sons and one daughter. Following the birth of her first child, she suffered from postnatal depression for several months.

Leadsom was a founder of the Northamptonshire Parent Infant Partnership, a charity providing therapeutic support to help parents bond with their babies who have insecure attachment, and also founded PIPUK, the national charity for Parent Infant Partnerships which set up branches in four further counties since its inception. NORPIP was originally set up with funding from the Ana Leaf Foundation, of which Leadsom's sister Hayley, wife of Peter de Putron, is a trustee.

Leadsom states that Christianity has a central role in her life. She has discussed her Christian faith openly in a video hosted on the website of the all party parliamentary group Christians in Parliament.

In July 2022, Leadsom's memoir Snakes and Ladders was published by Biteback.

== Honours ==
- 2016: Appointed to the Privy Council of the United Kingdom, giving her the honorific title "The Right Honourable" for life.
- 2021: Appointed Dame Commander of the Order of the British Empire (DBE) in the 2021 Birthday Honours for political service.

== Bibliography ==
- Snakes and Ladders: Navigating the ups and downs of politics (London: Biteback Publishing, 2022) ISBN 9781785907005

Parliament of the United Kingdom
New constituency	Member of Parliament for South Northamptonshire; 2010–2024	Succeeded by Sarah Bool
Political offices
Preceded by Nicky Morgan	Economic Secretary to the Treasury; 2014–2015	Succeeded by Harriett Baldwin
Preceded by Sajid Javid	City Minister; 2014–2015	Succeeded by Harriett Baldwin
Preceded by Matt Hancock	Minister of State for Energy; 2015–2016	Succeeded by Lucy Neville-Rolfe
Preceded by Liz Truss	Secretary of State for Environment, Food and Rural Affairs; 2016–2017	Succeeded by Michael Gove
Preceded by David Lidington	Leader of the House of Commons; 2017–2019	Succeeded by Mel Stride
Preceded by David Lidington	Lord President of the Council; 2017–2019	Succeeded by Mel Stride
Preceded by Greg Clark	Secretary of State for Business, Energy and Industrial Strategy; 2019–2020	Succeeded by Alok Sharma
