= Treasury Select Committee =

UK House of Commons select committee

The House of Commons Treasury Committee (often referred to as the Treasury Select Committee) is a select committee of the House of Commons in the Parliament of the United Kingdom. The committee is responsible for examining and scrutinizing the expenditure, administration and policy of HM Treasury. This includes its agencies and associated bodies, including HM Revenue and Customs, the Bank of England, the Prudential Regulation Authority, the Financial Conduct Authority, and the Royal Mint.

The current chair of the Treasury Select Committee is Dame Meg Hillier MP, from the Labour Party. The position of chair is considered influential, as the holder of the office can scrutinize figures including the Chancellor of the Exchequer, the Governor of the Bank of England, as well as bank executives.

== History ==
The select committee was established in 1979 as the Treasury and Civil Service Committee. Since 2010, the Treasury Committee has taken on new powers, including the right to veto appointments to the independent Office for Budget Responsibility, and has forced the Financial Services Authority to publish a detailed report into its handling of the collapse of Royal Bank of Scotland.

The select committee has been described as an influential one within British politics. In 2016, the committee was described as among the three most powerful select committees in the House of Commons, along with the Public Accounts Committee and the Culture, Media and Sport Committee.

=== Activities ===
==== Valuation Office Agency (VOA) Inquiry ====
On 1 February 2019, the Treasury Committee launched an inquiry looking into the impact of business rates and any unfairness in the system of rateable valuation operated by the Valuation Office Agency (VOA). The inquiry heard evidence from many businesses and trade organisations. The findings of this inquiry outlined that the service was broken and public confidence had been eroded. In its reply to the inquiry, February 2020, the Government promised to make changes to business rates as part of a fundamental review of the VOA.

== Chairs ==
Committee chairs include those listed below.

Name	Start	End	Party	Constituency
Tom Arnold	1 January 1995	16 October 1996	Conservative	Hazel Grove
Matthew Carrington	16 October 1996	13 January 1997	Conservative	Fulham
Barry Legg	13 January 1997	21 March 1997	Conservative	Milton Keynes South West
Giles Radice	16 July 1997	11 May 2001	Labour	North Durham
John McFall	16 July 2001	6 May 2010	Labour	Dumbarton (2001–2005)
John McFall	16 July 2001	6 May 2010	Labour	West Dunbartonshire (2005–2010)
Andrew Tyrie	9 June 2010	3 May 2017	Conservative	Chichester
Nicky Morgan	12 July 2017	25 July 2019	Conservative	Loughborough
John Mann; Acting	3 September 2019	13 September 2019	Labour	Bassetlaw
Catherine McKinnell; Acting	13 September 2019	23 October 2019	Labour	Newcastle upon Tyne North
Mel Stride	23 October 2019	25 October 2022	Conservative	Central Devon
Angela Eagle; Acting	25 October 2022	9 November 2022	Labour	Wallasey
Harriett Baldwin	9 November 2022	30 May 2024	Conservative	West Worcestershire
Meg Hillier	9 September 2024	present	Labour Co-op	Hackney South and Shoreditch

=== Election results ===
From June 2010 chairs of select committees have been directly elected by a secret ballot of the whole House of Commons using the alternative vote system. Candidates with the fewest votes are eliminated and their votes redistributed until one remaining candidate has more than half of valid votes. Elections are held at the beginning of a parliament or in the event of a vacancy.

Chair	Party	Constituency	First elected	Method
Meg Hillier	Labour and Co-op	Hackney South and Shoreditch	9 September 2024	Elected by the House of Commons
Harriett Baldwin	Conservative	West Worcestershire	9 November 2022	Elected by the House of Commons
Mel Stride	Conservative	Central Devon	23 October 2019	Elected by the House of Commons
Nicky Morgan	Conservative	Loughborough	12 July 2017	Elected by the House of Commons
Andrew Tyrie	Conservative	Chichester	10 June 2010	Elected by the House of Commons
John McFall	Labour Co-op	West Dunbartonshire (Dumbarton 1987–2005)	18 July 2001	Elected by the select committee
Giles Radice	Labour	North Durham	17 July 1997	Elected by the select committee

9 September 2024
Candidate	1st round	
Candidate	Votes	%
Meg Hillier	Unopposed	
Not redistributed		
Valid votes		

9 November 2022
Candidate	1st round		2nd round		3rd round		4th round	
Candidate	Votes	%	Votes	%	Votes	%	Votes	%
Harriett Baldwin	156	39.3	169	42.9	182	46.7	204	54.4
Andrea Leadsom	106	26.7	114	28.9	141	36.2	171	45.6
John Baron	55	13.9	61	15.5	67	17.2	Eliminated	
Kit Malthouse	46	11.6	50	12.7	Eliminated			
Richard Fuller	34	8.6	Eliminated					
Not redistributed			3	0.8	7	1.8	22	5.5
Valid votes	397		394		390		375	

29 January 2020
Candidate	1st round	
Candidate	Votes	%
Mel Stride	Unopposed	
Not redistributed		
Valid votes		

23 October 2019
Candidate	First round		Second round	
Candidate	Votes	%	Votes	%
Mel Stride	237	46.4	263	52.1
Kevin Hollinrake	166	32.5	175	34.7
Harriett Baldwin	62	12.1	67	13.3
Mark Garnier	46	9.0	Eliminated	
Not redistributed			6	1.2
Valid votes	511		505	

12 July 2017
Candidate	1st round		2nd round		3rd round		4th round		5th round	
Candidate	Votes	%	Votes	%	Votes	%	Votes	%	Votes	%
Nicky Morgan	200	35.1	207	36.4	227	40.5	254	46.4	290	56.2
Jacob Rees-Mogg	136	23.9	141	24.8	160	28.6	179	32.7	226	43.8
Charlie Elphicke	74	13.0	82	14.4	98	17.5	114	20.8	Eliminated	
Richard Bacon	65	11.4	71	12.5	75	13.4	Eliminated			
John Penrose	63	11.1	68	12.0	Eliminated					
Stephen Hammond	32	5.6	Eliminated							
Not redistributed			1	0.2	10	1.8	23	4.0	54	9.5
Valid votes	570		569		560		547		516	

17 June 2015
Candidate	1st round	
Candidate	Votes	%
Andrew Tyrie	Unopposed	
Not redistributed		
Valid votes		

9 June 2010
Candidate	1st round	
Candidate	Votes	%
Andrew Tyrie	352	61.6
Michael Fallon	219	38.4
Not redistributed		
Valid votes	571	

== Current membership ==
Membership of the committee is as follows:

Member	Party	Constituency
Meg Hillier MP (Chair)	Labour	Hackney South and Shoreditch
Harriett Baldwin MP	Conservative	West Worcestershire
Chris Coghlan MP	Liberal Democrats	Dorking and Horley
Bobby Dean MP	Liberal Democrats	Carshalton and Wallington
Jim Dickson MP	Labour	Dartford
John Glen MP	Conservative	Salisbury
Andrew Lewin MP	Labour	Welwyn Hatfield
Seema Malhotra MP	Labour	Feltham and Heston
Siobhain McDonagh MP	Labour	Mitcham and Morden
Julie Minns MP	Labour	Carlisle
Catherine West MP	Labour	Hornsey and Friern Barnet

=== Changes since 2024 ===
Date	Outgoing Member & Party	Constituency	→	New Member & Party	Constituency	Source
9 December 2024	Lucy Rigby MP (Labour)	Northampton North	→	John Grady MP (Labour)	Glasgow East	Hansard
27 October 2025	Lola McEvoy MP (Labour)	Darlington	→	Jim Dickson MP (Labour)	Dartford	Hansard
27 October 2025	Jeevun Sandher MP (Labour)	Loughborough	→	Luke Murphy MP (Labour)	Basingstoke	Hansard
27 October 2025	Rachel Blake MP (Labour)	Cities of London and Westminster	→	Catherine West MP (Labour)	Hornsey and Friern Barnet	Hansard
22 June 2026	Luke Murphy MP (Labour)	Basingstoke	→	Julie Minns MP (Labour)	Carlisle	Hansard
26 October 2025	John Grady MP (Labour)	Glasgow East	→	Andrew Lewin MP (Labour)	Welwyn Hatfield	Hansard
26 October 2025	Yuan Yang MP (Labour)	Earley and Woodley	→	Seema Malhotra MP (Labour)	Feltham and Heston	Hansard

== 2019–2024 Parliament ==
The chair was elected on 27 January 2020, with the members of the committee being announced on 2 March 2020.

Member	Party	Constituency
Mel Stride MP (Chair)	Conservative	Central Devon
Rushanara Ali MP	Labour	Bethnal Green and Bow
Steve Baker MP	Conservative	Wycombe
Harriett Baldwin MP	Conservative	West Worcestershire
Anthony Browne MP	Conservative	South Cambridgeshire
Felicity Buchan MP	Conservative	Kensington
Angela Eagle MP	Labour	Wallasey
Liz Kendall MP	Labour	Leicester West
Julie Marson MP	Conservative	Hertford and Stortford
Alison McGovern MP	Labour	Wirral South
Alison Thewliss MP	Scottish National Party	Glasgow Central

=== Changes 2019–2024 ===
Date	Outgoing member and party	Constituency	→	New member and party	Constituency	Source
11 May 2020	Liz Kendall MP (Labour)	Leicester West	→	Mike Hill MP (Labour)	Hartlepool	Hansard
11 May 2020	Alison McGovern MP (Labour)	Wirral South	→	Siobhain McDonagh MP (Labour)	Mitcham and Morden	Hansard
16 March 2021	Mike Hill MP (Labour)	Hartlepool	→	Vacant		Resignation of member from Parliament
20 April 2021	Vacant		→	Emma Hardy MP (Labour)	Kingston upon Hull West and Hessle	Hansard
19 October 2021	Steve Baker MP (Conservative)	Wycombe	→	Gareth Davies MP (Conservative)	Grantham and Stamford	Hansard
14 December 2021	Felicity Buchan MP (Conservative)	Kensington	→	Kevin Hollinrake MP (Conservative)	Thirsk and Malton	Hansard
26 October 2022	Mel Stride MP (Chair, Conservative)	Central Devon	→	Vacant		Hansard
9 November 2022	Harriett Baldwin MP (Conservative)	West Worcestershire	→	Vacant		Hansard
9 November 2022	Vacant		→	Harriett Baldwin MP (Chair, Conservative)	West Worcestershire	Hansard
21 November 2022	Vacant		→	John Baron MP (Conservative)	Basildon and Billericay	Hansard
21 November 2022	Gareth Davies MP (Conservative)	Grantham and Stamford	→	Danny Kruger MP (Conservative)	Devizes	Hansard
21 November 2022	Kevin Hollinrake MP (Conservative)	Thirsk and Malton	→	Andrea Leadsom MP (Conservative)	South Northamptonshire	Hansard
21 November 2022	Julie Marson MP (Conservative)	Hertford and Stortford	→	Anne Marie Morris MP (Conservative)	Newton Abbot	Hansard
16 January 2023	Alison Thewliss MP (SNP)	Glasgow Central	→	Douglas Chapman MP (SNP)	Dunfermline and West Fife	Hansard
26 June 2023	Anthony Browne MP (Conservative)	South Cambridgeshire	→	James Duddridge MP (Conservative)	Rochford and Southend East	Hansard
12 September 2023	Douglas Chapman MP (SNP)	Dunfermline and West Fife	→	Drew Hendry MP (SNP)	Inverness, Nairn, Badenoch and Strathspey	Hansard
20 November 2023	Rushanara Ali MP (Labour)	Bethnal Green and Bow	→	Keir Mather MP (Labour)	Selby and Ainsty	Hansard
11 December 2023	Sir James Duddridge MP (Conservative)	Rochford and Southend East	→	Thérèse Coffey MP (Conservative)	Suffolk Coastal	Hansard
11 December 2023	Dame Andrea Leadsom MP (Conservative)	South Northamptonshire	→	Stephen Hammond MP (Conservative)	Wimbledon	Hansard
11 March 2024	Emma Hardy MP (Labour)	Kingston upon Hull West and Hessle	→	Samantha Dixon MP (Labour)	City of Chester	Hansard

== Past membership lists ==
=== 2017–2019 Parliament ===
The chair was elected on 12 July 2017, with the members of the committee being announced on 11 September 2017.

Member	Party	Constituency
Nicky Morgan MP (Chair)	Conservative	Loughborough
Rushanara Ali MP	Labour	Bethnal Green and Bow
Charlie Elphicke MP	Conservative	Dover
Stephen Hammond MP	Conservative	Wimbledon
Stewart Hosie MP	Scottish National Party	Dundee East
Alister Jack MP	Conservative	Dumfries and Galloway
Kit Malthouse MP	Conservative	North West Hampshire
Alison McGovern MP	Labour and Co-op	Wirral South
Catherine McKinnell MP	Labour	Newcastle upon Tyne North
John Mann MP	Labour	Bassetlaw
Wes Streeting MP	Labour	Ilford North

==== Changes 2017–2019 ====
Date	Outgoing member and party	Constituency	→	New member and party	Constituency	Source
20 February 2018	Kit Malthouse MP (Conservative)	North West Hampshire	→	Simon Clarke MP (Conservative)	Middlesbrough South and East Cleveland	Hansard
29 October 2018	Alister Jack MP (Conservative)	Dumfries and Galloway	→	Colin Clark MP (Conservative)	Gordon	Hansard
3 December 2018	Stephen Hammond MP (Conservative)	Wimbledon	→	Steve Baker MP (Conservative)	Wycombe	Hansard
10 June 2019	Stewart Hosie MP (SNP)	Dundee East	→	Alison Thewliss MP (SNP)	Glasgow Central	Hansard
25 July 2019	Nicky Morgan MP (Conservative)	Loughborough	→	Vacant		Hansard
23 October 2019	Vacant		→	Mel Stride MP (Conservative)	Central Devon	Hansard

=== 2015–2017 Parliament ===
The chair was elected on 18 June 2015, with members being announced on 8 July 2015.

Member	Party	Constituency
Andrew Tyrie MP (Chair)	Conservative	Chichester
Steve Baker MP	Conservative	Wycombe
Bill Esterson MP	Labour	Sefton Central
Mark Garnier MP	Conservative	Wyre Forest
Helen Goodman MP	Labour and Co-op	Bishop Auckland
Stephen Hammond MP	Conservative	Wimbledon
George Kerevan MP	Scottish National Party	East Lothian
John Mann MP	Labour	Bassetlaw
Chris Philp MP	Conservative	Croydon South
Jacob Rees-Mogg MP	Conservative	North East Somerset
Wes Streeting MP	Labour	Ilford North

==== Changes 2015–2017 ====
Date	Outgoing member and party	Constituency	→	New member and party	Constituency	Source
26 October 2015	Bill Esterson MP (Labour)	Sefton Central	→	Rachel Reeves MP (Labour)	Leeds West	Hansard
31 October 2016	Mark Garnier MP (Conservative)	Wyre Forest	→	Kit Malthouse MP (Conservative)	North West Hampshire	Hansard

=== 2010–2015 Parliament ===
The chair was elected on 10 June 2010, with members being announced on 12 July 2010.

Member	Party	Constituency
Andrew Tyrie MP (Chair)	Conservative	Chichester
John Cryer MP	Labour	Leyton and Wanstead
Michael Fallon MP	Conservative	Sevenoaks
Mark Garnier MP	Conservative	Wyre Forest
Stewart Hosie MP	Scottish National Party	Dundee East
Andrea Leadsom MP	Conservative	South Northamptonshire
Andy Love MP	Labour and Co-op	Edmonton
John Mann MP	Labour	Bassetlaw
George Mudie MP	Labour	Leeds East
Jesse Norman MP	Conservative	Hereford and South Herefordshire
David Rutley MP	Conservative	Macclesfield
John Thurso MP	Liberal Democrats	Caithness, Sutherland and Easter Ross
Chuka Umunna MP	Labour	Streatham

=== Changes 2010–2015 ===
Date	Outgoing member and party	Constituency	→	New member and party	Constituency	Source
29 November 2010	David Rutley MP (Conservative)	Macclesfield	→	David Ruffley MP (Conservative)	Bury St Edmunds	Hansard
4 July 2011	Chuka Umunna MP (Labour)	Streatham	→	Tom Blenkinsop MP (Labour)	Middlesbrough South and East Cleveland	Hansard
14 November 2011	Tom Blenkinsop MP (Labour)	Middlesbrough South and East Cleveland	→	Pat McFadden MP (Labour)	Wolverhampton South East	Hansard
14 November 2011	John Cryer MP (Labour)	Leyton and Wanstead	→	Teresa Pearce MP (Labour)	Erith and Thamesmead	Hansard
5 November 2012	Michael Fallon MP (Conservative)	Sevenoaks	→	Brooks Newmark MP (Conservative)	Braintree	Hansard
12 May 2014	Andrea Leadsom MP (Conservative)	South Northamptonshire	→	Steve Baker MP (Conservative)	Wycombe	Hansard
12 September 2014	Brooks Newmark MP (Conservative)	Braintree	→	Alok Sharma MP (Conservative)	Reading West	Hansard
24 November 2014	Pat McFadden MP (Labour)	Wolverhampton South East	→	Rushanara Ali MP (Labour)	Bethnal Green and Bow	Hansard
24 November 2014	George Mudie MP (Labour)	Leeds East	→	Mike Kane MP (Labour)	Wythenshawe and Sale East	Hansard

== See also ==
- Parliamentary committees of the United Kingdom
