= Harriett Baldwin =

British politician (born 1960)

Dame Harriett Baldwin DBE MP
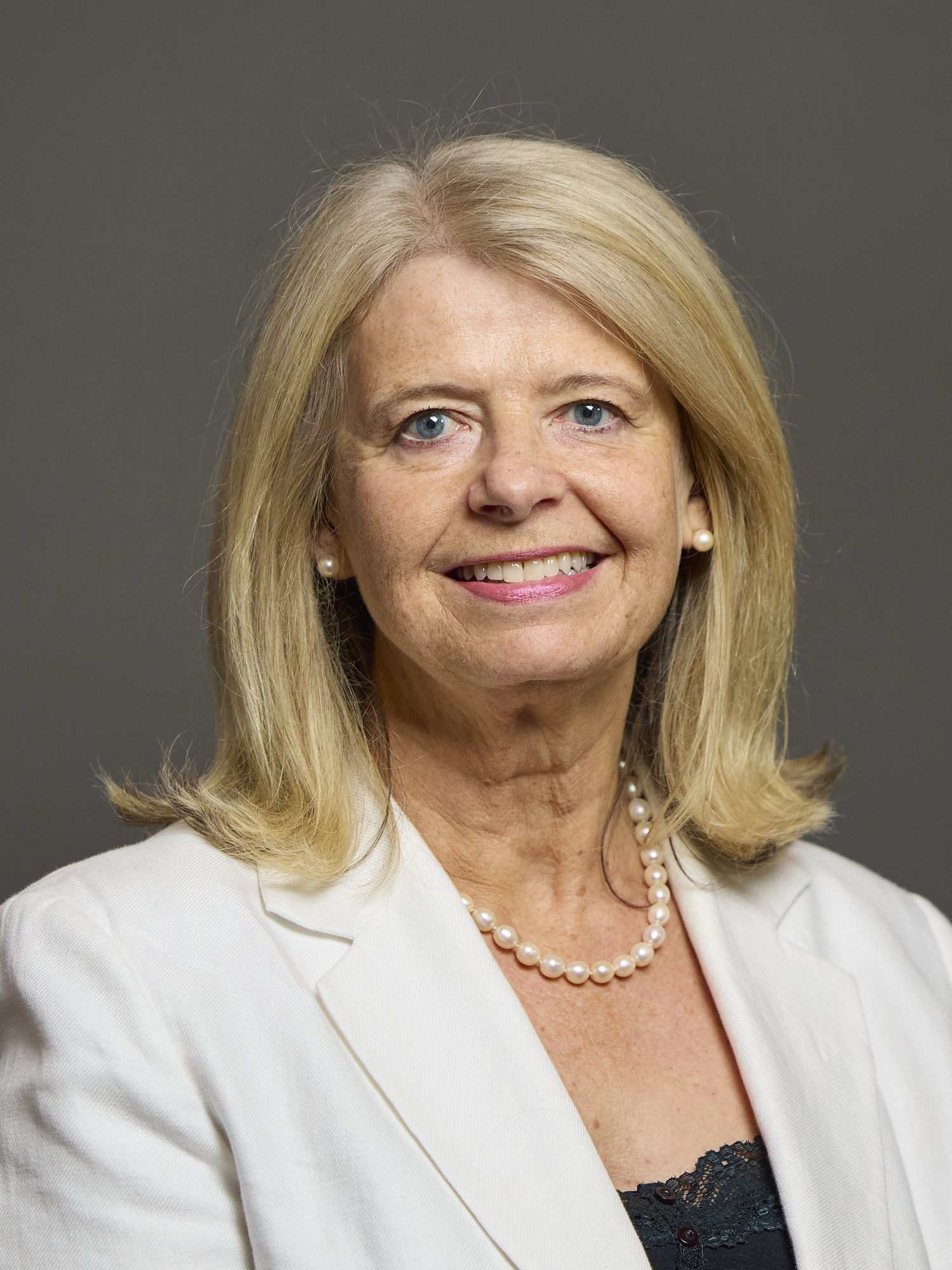
- Official portrait, 2024

Shadow Paymaster General Shadow Minister for the Taxpayer
- Incumbent
- Assumed office 31 August 2026
- Leader: Kemi Badenoch
- Preceded by: Richard Holden (2025)

Shadow Minister for Business and Trade
- In office 24 November 2025 – 31 August 2026
- Leader: Kemi Badenoch
- Preceded by: Meg Hillier
- Succeeded by: Mark Garnier

Shadow Minister for Development
- In office 19 July 2024 – 5 November 2024
- Leader: Rishi Sunak
- Preceded by: Lisa Nandy
- Succeeded by: Wendy Morton (Note: As Shadow Minister for Foreign Affairs)

Chair of the Treasury Select Committee
- In office 9 November 2022 – 30 May 2024
- Preceded by: Mel Stride; Angela Eagle (acting)
- Succeeded by: Meg Hillier

Minister of State for Africa and International Development
- In office 9 January 2018 – 25 July 2019
- Prime Minister: Theresa May
- Preceded by: Rory Stewart
- Succeeded by: Andrew Stephenson

Parliamentary Under-Secretary of State for Defence Procurement
- In office 17 July 2016 – 9 January 2018
- Prime Minister: Theresa May
- Preceded by: Philip Dunne
- Succeeded by: Guto Bebb

Economic Secretary to the Treasury
- In office 11 May 2015 – 16 July 2016
- Prime Minister: David Cameron
- Preceded by: Andrea Leadsom
- Succeeded by: Simon Kirby

Lord Commissioner of the Treasury
- In office 14 July 2014 – 8 May 2015
- Prime Minister: David Cameron
- Preceded by: Sam Gyimah
- Succeeded by: Mel Stride

Member of Parliament for West Worcestershire
- Incumbent
- Assumed office 6 May 2010
- Preceded by: Michael Spicer
- Majority: 6,547 (12.0%)

Personal details
- Born: Harriett Mary Morison Eggleston; 2 May 1960 (age 66) Watford, Hertfordshire, England
- Party: Conservative
- Spouse: James Baldwin (m. 2004)
- Children: 3
- Education: Friends' School, Saffron Walden; Marlborough College; Lady Margaret Hall, Oxford (MA); McGill University (MBA)
- Website: Official website

Dame Harriett Mary Morison Baldwin (née Eggleston; born 2 May 1960) is a British Conservative Party politician who has served as Shadow Paymaster General and Shadow Minister for the Taxpayer since September 2026, the latter of which being a newly-created position.

She has been the Member of Parliament (MP) for West Worcestershire since 2010. She was Minister of State for Africa and International Development between 2018 and 2019, and served as Chair of the Treasury Select Committee from 2022 to 2024. She was also Shadow Minister for Business from November 2025 to September 2026.

Prior to entering parliament, Baldwin worked for the investment bank JPMorgan Chase.

== Early life and career ==
Harriett Eggleston was born on 2 May 1960 in Watford to Anthony Francis Eggleston and Jane Morison Buxton. Her father was headmaster of Felsted School in Essex and previously headmaster of Campion School in Athens. Her childhood was spent in Cyprus and Felsted, being educated at two private schools, the Friends' School, Saffron Walden, and Marlborough College, Wiltshire.

Baldwin studied at Lady Margaret Hall, Oxford between 1978 and 1982, where she received an MA degree in Modern Languages (French and Russian). She furthermore obtained an MBA degree in international finance from McGill University (Montreal, Canada) in 1985.

Baldwin joined the investment bank JPMorgan Chase in 1986, becoming managing director and head of currency management at their London office in 1998. She later became a pension fund manager at the bank before leaving in 2008. She served as vice-chair of Social Investment Business between 2008 and 2012.

== Parliamentary career ==
At the 2005 general election, Baldwin was the Conservative candidate in Stockton North, coming second with 20.8% of the vote behind the incumbent Labour MP Frank Cook.

Baldwin was elected at the 2010 general election as MP for West Worcestershire, winning with 50.4% of the vote and a majority of 6,754.

During the coalition government under Prime Minister David Cameron, she was a member of the Work and Pensions Select Committee until she was appointed Parliamentary private secretary to the Minister of State for Employment Mark Hoban at the Department for Work and Pensions in 2012. Baldwin was also a member of the UK's delegation to the NATO Parliamentary Assembly.

In February 2014, Baldwin became an Assistant Whip and in the Government reshuffle in July, she was promoted to the role of Government Whip, Lord Commissioner of HM Treasury.

At the 2015 general election, Baldwin was re-elected as MP for West Worcestershire with an increased vote share of 56.1% and an increased majority of 22,578. After the election, she was appointed Economic Secretary to the Treasury and City Minister. Baldwin was also appointed as the Prime Minister's Trade Envoy to Russia.

She supported the UK remaining within the EU in the 2016 membership referendum.

In July 2016, Baldwin was appointed as Parliamentary Under-Secretary and Minister for Defence Procurement at the Ministry of Defence as part of the Government reshuffle by new Prime Minister Theresa May.

Baldwin was again re-elected at the snap 2017 general election, with an increased vote share of 61.5% and a decreased majority of 21,328.

Baldwin served as Minister of State for Africa and International Development between January 2018 and July 2019. She voted for then Prime Minister Theresa May's Brexit withdrawal agreement. In the 2019 Conservative Party leadership election, Baldwin supported Jeremy Hunt.

At the 2019 general election, Baldwin was again re-elected, with a decreased vote share of 60.7% and an increased majority of 24,499.

Baldwin has been a member of the Treasury Select Committee since March 2020 and was elected its chair in 2022. In this role, Baldwin opposed plans of the Sunak ministry to disestablish the Office of Tax Simplification.

A steering committee member of the lockdown-sceptic COVID Recovery Group, a group of Conservative MPs opposed to the UK Government's December 2020 lockdown, she supported Penny Mordaunt in the October 2022 Conservative Party leadership election.

Baldwin has sponsored the Hereditary Titles (Female Succession) Bill, a private member's bill to make provision for the succession of female heirs to hereditary titles in both 2022 and 2024. On both occasions, the bill was not discussed and was timed out.

At the 2024 general election, Baldwin was again re-elected, with a decreased vote share of 36.2% and a decreased majority of 6,547.

== Personal life ==
Harriet is married to James Stanley Baldwin. They have lived in the Teme Valley since 2006. She has two stepdaughters and a son from her previous marriage with Charles Richmond.

In March 2024, Baldwin was appointed Dame Commander of the Order of the British Empire (DBE) for "public and parliamentary service".

== Notes ==
Parliament of the United Kingdom
Preceded by Michael Spicer	Member of Parliament for West Worcestershire; 2010–present	Incumbent
