= Rachel Blake =

British politician

Rachel Blake MP
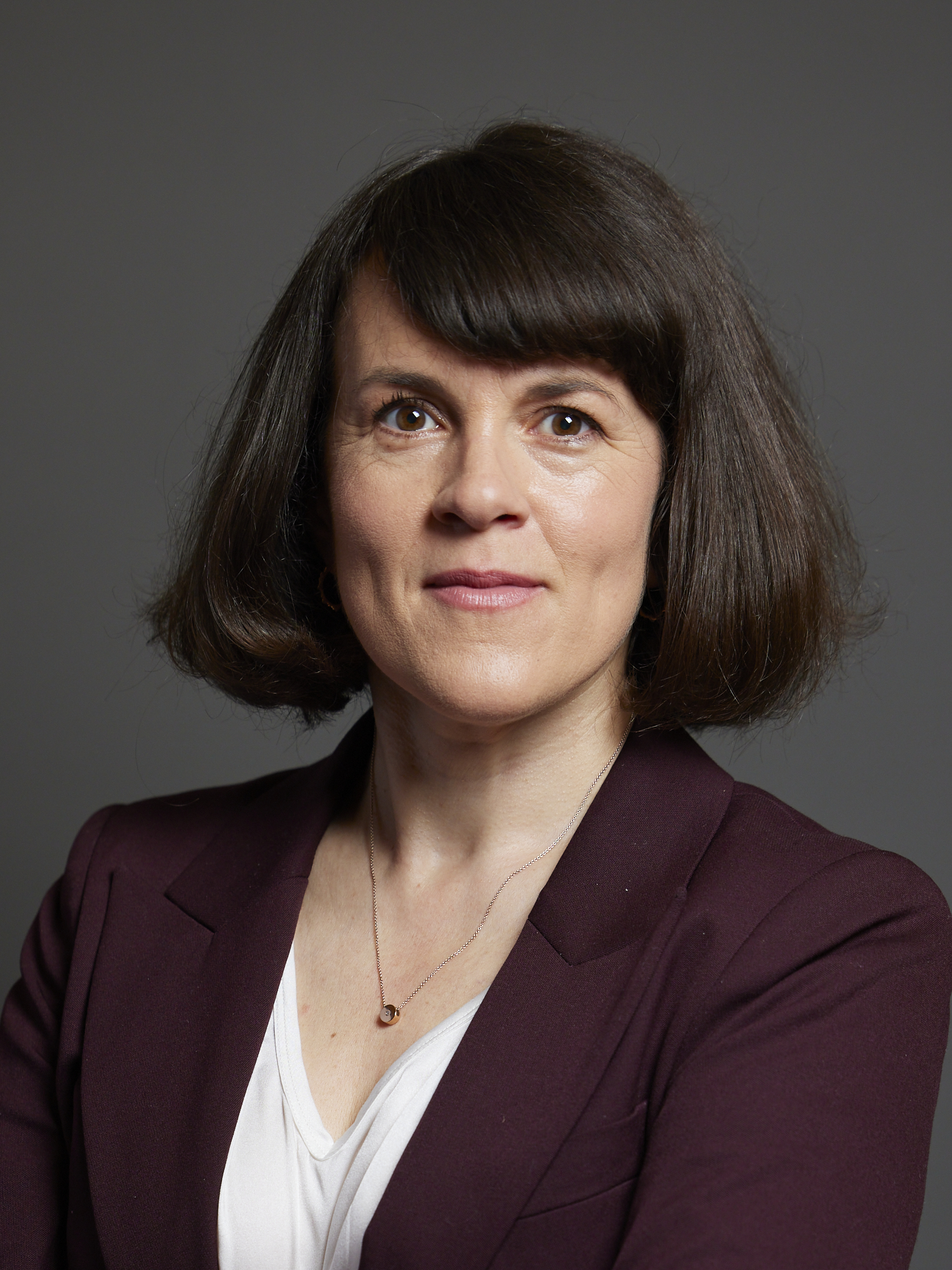
- Official portrait, 2024

Economic Secretary to the Treasury City Minister
- In office 14 May 2026 – 20 July 2026
- Prime Minister: Keir Starmer
- Preceded by: Lucy Rigby
- Succeeded by: Lucy Rigby

Member of Parliament for Cities of London and Westminster
- Incumbent
- Assumed office 4 July 2024
- Preceded by: Nickie Aiken
- Majority: 2,708 (6.9%)

Member of Tower Hamlets London Borough Council for Bow East
- In office 22 May 2014 – 26 July 2024

Personal details
- Born: Rachel Nancy Blake Manchester, England
- Party: Labour Co-op
- Domestic partner: Marc Francis
- Children: 2
- Education: Corpus Christi College, Cambridge (BA); London School of Economics (MSc)
- Website: www.rachelblake.org.uk

Rachel Nancy Blake is a British politician who has served as the Member of Parliament (MP) for Cities of London and Westminster since 2024. She served as Economic Secretary to the Treasury from May to July 2026.

A member of Labour Co-op, she previously represented Bow East on Tower Hamlets London Borough Council from 2014 to 2024 and was deputy mayor of Tower Hamlets from 2018 to 2022.

== Political career ==
Blake attended Corpus Christi College, Cambridge, graduating with a BA degree in 2001, before studying for a master's degree in social policy at the London School of Economics. She joined the Labour Party in 2003. Early in her career, she was a policy adviser at HM Treasury under then-Chancellor of the Exchequer Gordon Brown and was a member of Kate Barker's team on a Review of Land Use Planning which was published in December 2006. From 2009 to 2013, she was a manager at East London Housing Partnership.

=== Tower Hamlets Borough Councillor ===
In May 2014, Blake was elected as a Labour Party councillor for the Bow East ward on Tower Hamlets London Borough Council, before her appointment to Tower Hamlets' Cabinet in July 2015. Re-elected in 2018 and 2022, Blake resigned in July 2024 following her election as the MP for the Cities of London and Westminster constituency.

Representing the Local Government Association at a hearing of the Housing, Communities and Local Government Select Committee in June 2021, she claimed that national regulations often held back and undermined local ambition and innovation on climate change. She called for more ambitious building standards on energy efficiency, but noted that competitions for funding meant councils often wasted resources on bidding. At a Local Government Association community wellbeing ward in December 2021 she attacked poor organisation of the COVID-19 vaccine booster programme.

Blake was vice-chair of the Labour Housing Group (2022-2024). She was previously the secretary of the London Labour Housing Group and a member of the London Legacy Development Corporation Board. She has campaigned for tougher regulations of short-term rentals in London, housing improvements and other built environment issues.

=== Member of Parliament ===
Rachel Blake was elected as the Member of Parliament (MP) for Cities of London and Westminster in the 2024 general election.

In May 2026, following a government reshuffle, Blake was appointed as Economic Secretary to the Treasury, replacing Lucy Rigby. She returned to the backbenches in July 2026, when Andy Burnham became Prime Minister; she was replaced in the role by Lucy Rigby.

== Personal life ==
Blake was born in Manchester and grew up in London, where she currently lives. Her partner, Marc Francis, was a Tower Hamlets borough councillor until losing re-election in 2026. She has two sons. She is a member of Unison and the GMB Union.

Parliament of the United Kingdom
Preceded by Nickie Aiken	Member of Parliament for Cities of London and Westminster; 2024–present	Incumbent
