= Gartmore Group =

British investment management business

Gartmore Group Limited
- Company type: Public
- Traded as: LSE: GRT
- Industry: Investment management
- Founded: 1969; 57 years ago
- Defunct: 2011; 15 years ago
- Fate: Bought by Henderson Group
- Headquarters: London, UK
- Key people: Andrew Skirton (Chairman); Jeffrey Meyer (CEO)
- Revenue: £278.3 million (2009)
- Operating income: £53.1 million (2009)
- Net income: £47.6 million (2009)
- Website: gartmore.com Archived 2 November 2008 at the Wayback Machine

Gartmore Group Limited was a British-based investment management business. It was listed on the London Stock Exchange.

== History ==
The company was founded in 1969 by British & Commonwealth and acquired by Banque Indosuez in 1989. It was first listed on the London Stock Exchange in 1993. It was then bought by NatWest in 1996 and by Nationwide Mutual Insurance Company in 2000 before becoming part of the investment portfolio of Hellman & Friedman, a private equity fund, in 2006. It was re-listed on the London Stock Exchange in December 2009.

Henderson Group announced its acquisition of the company in January 2011.

== Operations ==
The company had £22.2 billion of assets under management as at 31 December 2009.
