= City Minister =

Junior minister in the British Treasury

- Royal Arms as used by His Majesty's Government

- Incumbent; Lucy Rigby since 21 July 2026
- HM Treasury
- Appointer: The British Monarch (on advice of the Prime Minister)
- Inaugural holder: Paul Myners, Baron Myners
- Formation: 3 October 2008
- Website: HM Treasury

City Minister is a ministerial position in His Majesty's Treasury. The minister is responsible for the British financial services sector, which is commonly known as "the City". Since 2014, the position is commonly held concurrently with Economic Secretary to the Treasury.

== History ==
The term "City Minister" was first used as a nickname for the position of Financial Services Secretary to the Treasury which was created by Gordon Brown upon coming to office in October 2008. The only person to have held the office was Lord Myners, who served from October 2008 to May 2010.

In May 2010 as part of the ministerial reorganisation by the Cameron Government the position of Financial Services Secretary to the Treasury was abolished. However, the idea of there being a minister specifically responsible for the City was retained and it was decided that the post would be held concurrently with the position of Financial Secretary to the Treasury, held at the time by Mark Hoban.

Following the promotion of Sajid Javid to Secretary of State for Culture, Media and Sport in April 2014 the portfolio of City Minister was moved from the Financial Secretary to the Treasury to the Economic Secretary to the Treasury.

Following the 2017 snap general election, City Minister Simon Kirby lost his seat and was succeeded by Steve Barclay.

Following Liz Truss becoming Prime Minister, although Richard Fuller retained his position as Economic Secretary to the Treasury, the City Minister brief was removed from him and returned to the Financial Secretary to the Treasury.

== List of officeholders ==
Colour key (for political parties):
Conservative Labour

City Minister	Term of office		Political party	Prime Minister	Chancellor
As Financial Services Secretary to the Treasury
Paul Myners, Baron Myners; Life peer	3 October 2008	13 May 2010	Labour	Brown	Darling
As Financial Secretary to the Treasury
Mark Hoban; MP for Fareham	13 May 2010	4 September 2012	Conservative	Cameron (Coalition)	Osborne
Greg Clark; MP for Tunbridge Wells	4 September 2012	7 October 2013	Conservative	Cameron (Coalition)	Osborne
Sajid Javid; MP for Bromsgrove	7 October 2013	9 April 2014	Conservative	Cameron (Coalition)	Osborne
As Economic Secretary to the Treasury
Andrea Leadsom; MP for South Northamptonshire	9 April 2014	11 May 2015	Conservative	Cameron (Coalition)	Osborne
Harriett Baldwin; MP for West Worcestershire	11 May 2015	16 July 2016	Conservative	Cameron (II)	Osborne
Simon Kirby; MP for Brighton Kemptown	16 July 2016	8 June 2017	Conservative	May	Hammond
Steve Barclay; MP for North East Cambridgeshire	14 June 2017	9 January 2018	Conservative	May	Hammond
John Glen; MP for Salisbury	9 January 2018	6 July 2022	Conservative	May	Hammond
John Glen; MP for Salisbury	9 January 2018	6 July 2022	Conservative	Johnson	Javid
John Glen; MP for Salisbury	9 January 2018	6 July 2022	Conservative	Johnson	Sunak
Richard Fuller; MP for North East Bedfordshire	8 July 2022	6 September 2022	Conservative	Johnson	Sunak
Richard Fuller; MP for North East Bedfordshire	8 July 2022	6 September 2022	Conservative	Johnson	Zahawi
As Financial Secretary to the Treasury
Andrew Griffith; MP for Arundel and South Downs	7 September 2022	27 October 2022	Conservative	Truss	Kwarteng
Andrew Griffith; MP for Arundel and South Downs	7 September 2022	27 October 2022	Conservative	Truss	Hunt
As Economic Secretary to the Treasury
Andrew Griffith; Arundel and South Downs	27 October 2022	13 November 2023	Conservative	Sunak	Hunt
Bim Afolami; MP for Hitchin and Harpenden	13 November 2023	5 July 2024	Conservative	Sunak	Hunt
Tulip Siddiq; MP for Hampstead and Highgate	9 July 2024	14 January 2025	Labour	Starmer	Reeves
Emma Reynolds; MP for Wycombe	14 January 2025	5 September 2025	Labour	Starmer	Reeves
Lucy Rigby; MP for Northampton North	6 September 2025	14 May 2026	Labour	Starmer	Reeves
Rachel Blake; MP for Cities of London and Westminster	14 May 2026	20 July 2026	Labour	Starmer	Reeves
Lucy Rigby; MP for Northampton North	21 July 2026	Incumbent	Labour Co-op	Burnham	Healey
