= Economic Secretary to the Treasury =

Junior minister in the British Treasury

United Kingdom Economic Secretary to the Treasury
- Royal arms of His Majesty's Government

- Incumbent; Lucy Rigby since 21 July 2026
- His Majesty's Treasury
- Reports to: First Lord of the Treasury (Prime Minister); Chancellor of the Exchequer
- Nominator: Prime Minister
- Appointer: The King (on the advice of the prime minister)
- Term length: At His Majesty's pleasure
- Inaugural holder: Douglas Jay
- Formation: 13 November 1947
- Website: Official Website

The Economic Secretary to the Treasury (EST) is a ministerial position in HM Treasury responsible for the UK government’s financial services, economic sanctions, financial crime, and debt and reserves management policy. Furthermore, the EST is responsible for the Treasury’s interests in British Overseas Territories (BOTs) and Crown Dependencies. Since 2014, the position has typically been held concurrently with City Minister. The position is shadowed by the Shadow Economic Secretary to the Treasury.

== History ==
The office was created in November 1947. In 1961, the economic secretary became junior to the new office of Chief Secretary to the Treasury, which held a seat in cabinet.

Following the establishment of the Department of Economic Affairs in 1964, the economic secretary, Anthony Crosland, transferred to become Minister of State in that department. The post of Economic Secretary to the Treasury was abolished on 22 December 1964. Although the Department of Economic Affairs closed in 1969, the Treasury post was not re-established until 11 November 1981.

From April 2014 to September 2022, and since October 2022, the office of Economic Secretary to the Treasury has been held concurrently with the portfolio of 'City Minister'.

== Economic secretaries to the Treasury, 1947–present ==
Colour key (for political parties):
Conservative Labour

Economic Secretary	Term of office		Political party	Prime Minister	Chancellor
Douglas Jay; MP for Battersea North	13 November 1947	2 March 1950	Labour	Attlee	Cripps
John Edwards; MP for Brighouse and Spenborough	19 October 1950	26 October 1951	Labour	Attlee	Gaitskell
Office not in use	26 October 1951	24 November 1952		Churchill	Butler
Reginald Maudling; MP for Barnet	24 November 1952	7 April 1955	Conservative	Churchill	Butler
Sir Edward Boyle; MP for Birmingham Handsworth	7 April 1955	11 November 1956	Conservative	Eden	Macmillan
Derek Walker-Smith; MP for East Hertfordshire	11 November 1956	16 January 1957	Conservative	Eden	Macmillan
Nigel Birch; MP for West Flintshire	16 January 1957	6 January 1958	Conservative	Macmillan	Thorneycroft
Office not in use	6 January 1958	23 October 1958		Macmillan	H-Amory
Frederick Erroll; MP for Altrincham and Sale	23 October 1958	22 October 1959	Conservative	Macmillan	H-Amory
Anthony Barber; MP for Doncaster	22 October 1959	16 July 1962	Conservative	Macmillan	H-Amory
Anthony Barber; MP for Doncaster	22 October 1959	16 July 1962	Conservative	Macmillan	Lloyd
Edward du Cann; MP for Taunton	16 July 1962	21 October 1963	Conservative	Macmillan	Maudling
Maurice Macmillan; MP for Halifax	21 October 1963	16 October 1964	Conservative	D-Home	Maudling
Anthony Crosland; MP for Great Grimsby	19 October 1964	22 December 1964	Labour	Wilson	Callaghan
Office not in use	22 December 1964	11 November 1981		Wilson	Callaghan
Office not in use	22 December 1964	11 November 1981		Wilson	Jenkins
Office not in use	22 December 1964	11 November 1981		Heath	Macleod
Office not in use	22 December 1964	11 November 1981		Heath	Barber
Office not in use	22 December 1964	11 November 1981		Wilson	Healey
Office not in use	22 December 1964	11 November 1981		Callaghan	Healey
Office not in use	22 December 1964	11 November 1981		Thatcher	Howe
Jock Bruce-Gardyne; MP for Knutsford	11 November 1981	13 June 1983	Conservative	Thatcher	Howe
John Moore; MP for Croydon Central	13 June 1983	19 October 1983	Conservative	Thatcher	Lawson
Ian Stewart; MP for North Hertfordshire	19 October 1983	11 June 1987	Conservative	Thatcher	Lawson
Peter Lilley; MP for St Albans	11 June 1987	24 July 1989	Conservative	Thatcher	Lawson
Richard Ryder; MP for Mid Norfolk	24 July 1989	14 July 1990	Conservative	Thatcher	Lawson
Richard Ryder; MP for Mid Norfolk	24 July 1989	14 July 1990	Conservative	Thatcher	Major
John Maples; MP for Lewisham West	23 July 1990	14 April 1992	Conservative	Thatcher	Major
John Maples; MP for Lewisham West	23 July 1990	14 April 1992	Conservative	Major	Lamont
Anthony Nelson; MP for Chichester	14 April 1992	6 July 1995	Conservative	Major	Lamont
Anthony Nelson; MP for Chichester	14 April 1992	6 July 1995	Conservative	Major	Clarke
Angela Knight; MP for Erewash	6 July 1995	2 May 1997	Conservative	Major	Clarke
Helen Liddell; MP for Airdrie and Shotts	3 May 1997	27 July 1998	Labour	Blair	Brown
Patricia Hewitt; MP for Leicester West	27 July 1998	17 May 1999	Labour	Blair	Brown
Melanie Johnson; MP for Welwyn Hatfield	17 May 1999	8 June 2001	Labour	Blair	Brown
Ruth Kelly; MP for Bolton West	8 June 2001	15 May 2002	Labour	Blair	Brown
Office not in use	15 May 2002	30 May 2002		Blair	Brown
John Healey; MP for Wentworth	30 May 2002	6 May 2005	Labour	Blair	Brown
Ivan Lewis; MP for Bury South	May 2005	May 2006	Labour	Blair	Brown
Ed Balls; MP for Normanton	6 May 2006	28 June 2007	Labour	Blair	Brown
Kitty Ussher; MP for Burnley	29 June 2007	5 October 2008	Labour	Brown	Darling
Ian Pearson; MP for Dudley South	5 October 2008	11 May 2010	Labour	Brown	Darling
Justine Greening; MP for Putney	13 May 2010	14 October 2011	Conservative	Cameron (Coalition)	Osborne
Chloe Smith; MP for Norwich North	14 October 2011	4 September 2012	Conservative	Cameron (Coalition)	Osborne
Sajid Javid; MP for Bromsgrove	4 September 2012	7 October 2013	Conservative	Cameron (Coalition)	Osborne
Nicky Morgan; MP for Loughborough	7 October 2013	9 April 2014	Conservative	Cameron (Coalition)	Osborne
Andrea Leadsom; MP for South Northamptonshire	9 April 2014	11 May 2015	Conservative	Cameron (Coalition)	Osborne
Harriett Baldwin; MP for West Worcestershire	11 May 2015	16 July 2016	Conservative	Cameron (II)	Osborne
Simon Kirby; MP for Brighton Kemptown	17 July 2016	9 June 2017	Conservative	May (I)	Hammond
Steve Barclay; MP for North East Cambridgeshire	14 June 2017	9 January 2018	Conservative	May (II)	Hammond
John Glen; MP for Salisbury	9 January 2018	6 July 2022	Conservative	May (II)	Hammond
John Glen; MP for Salisbury	9 January 2018	6 July 2022	Conservative	Johnson	Javid
John Glen; MP for Salisbury	9 January 2018	6 July 2022	Conservative	Johnson	Sunak
Richard Fuller; MP for North East Bedfordshire	8 July 2022	27 October 2022	Conservative	Johnson	Zahawi
Richard Fuller; MP for North East Bedfordshire	8 July 2022	27 October 2022	Conservative	Truss	Kwarteng
Richard Fuller; MP for North East Bedfordshire	8 July 2022	27 October 2022	Conservative	Truss	Hunt
Andrew Griffith; MP for Arundel and South Downs	27 October 2022	13 November 2023	Conservative	Sunak	Hunt
Bim Afolami; MP for Hitchin and Harpenden	13 November 2023	5 July 2024	Conservative	Sunak	Hunt
Tulip Siddiq; MP for Hampstead and Highgate	9 July 2024	14 January 2025	Labour	Starmer	Reeves
Emma Reynolds; MP for Wycombe	14 January 2025	5 September 2025	Labour	Starmer	Reeves
Lucy Rigby; MP for Northampton North	6 September 2025	14 May 2026	Labour	Starmer	Reeves
Rachel Blake; MP for Cities of London and Westminster	14 May 2026	20 July 2026	Labour Co-op	Starmer	Reeves
Lucy Rigby; MP for Northampton North	21 July 2026	Incumbent	Labour	Burnham	Healey

== See also ==
- Secretary to the Treasury
