= Mark Hoban =

British politician (born 1964)

Mark Hoban ACA
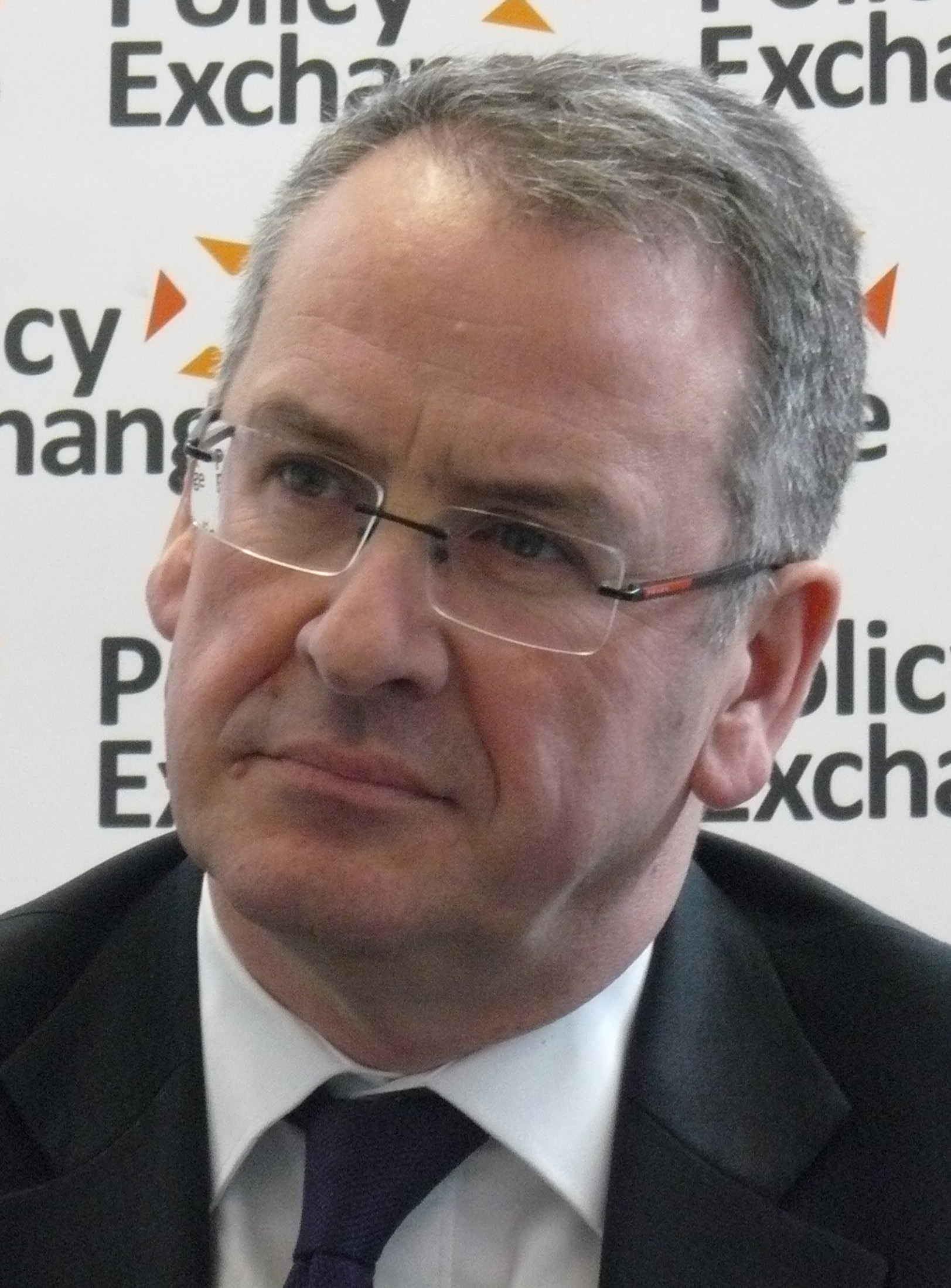
- Hoban in 2013

Minister of State for Employment
- In office 4 September 2012 – 7 October 2013
- Prime Minister: David Cameron
- Preceded by: Chris Grayling
- Succeeded by: Esther McVey

Financial Secretary to the Treasury City Minister
- In office 13 May 2010 – 4 September 2012
- Prime Minister: David Cameron
- Preceded by: Stephen Timms (as Financial Secretary); The Lord Myners (as City Minister)
- Succeeded by: Greg Clark

Member of Parliament for Fareham
- In office 7 June 2001 – 30 March 2015
- Preceded by: Peter Lloyd
- Succeeded by: Suella Braverman

Personal details
- Born: 31 March 1964 (age 62) Peterlee, County Durham, England
- Party: Conservative
- Spouse: Fiona Jane Barrett
- Education: London School of Economics (BSc)
- Website: markhoban.com

Mark Gerard Hoban (born 31 March 1964) is a British politician. A member of the Conservative Party, he is a former Member of Parliament for Fareham (2001–2015) and former Minister of State for Work and Pensions (2012–2013).

== Early life ==
Hoban was born in Peterlee and was educated at St Leonard's Catholic School in Durham. He graduated from the London School of Economics where he was awarded a Bachelor of Science degree in economics in 1985.

He joined PricewaterhouseCoopers in 1985 as a financial analyst, becoming a chartered account manager in 1990, and was appointed as a senior manager in 1992 until his election to Parliament.

== Parliamentary career ==
Hoban joined the Conservative Party in 1980, and in 1989 was elected as the treasurer of the Southampton Itchen Conservative Association, serving until he was elected as the Association's vice chairman for two years in 1991.

He was the campaign manager for the local sitting Conservative MP Christopher Chope at both the 1987 and 1992 general elections.

He contested the Tyneside seat of South Shields at the 1997 general election, finishing in second place, 22,153 votes behind the sitting Labour MP, David Clark.

He was elected to the House of Commons at the 2001 general election for the Hampshire seat of Fareham following the retirement of the Conservative MP Peter Lloyd.

Hoban held the seat with a majority of 7,009 and remained the MP there until 2015. He made his maiden speech on 4 July 2001, in which he recalled one of his Fareham predecessors, Arthur Lee, who had donated the Prime Minister's country house, Chequers, to the nation in 1921.

In parliament he served as a member of the science and technology select committee for two years from 2001. He was made an Opposition Whip by Iain Duncan Smith in 2002, joining the frontbench under the leadership of Michael Howard in 2003 as a spokesman on education. Following the election of David Cameron as the party's leader in 2005, Hoban became Shadow Financial Secretary to the Treasury.

After the May 2010 general election, Hoban took his shadow portfolio into Government when he was appointed Financial Secretary and City Minister in George Osborne's Treasury team. His responsibilities included financial services policy, including banking and financial services reform and regulation, financial stability, City competitiveness, wholesale and retail markets in the UK, Europe and internationally; the Financial Services Authority (FSA); UK Financial Investments (UKFI); and personal savings and pensions policy. He supported the Chancellor on EU and wider international finance issues.

He was also chairman of the Associate Parliamentary Group on Business, Finance and Accountancy, until succeeded by Ian Wright MP.

It was reported in the Independent in December 2011 that Hoban had been involved in meetings with bankers lobbying to avoid proposals in the Vickers Report that were intended to reduce risks in the banking industry. The talks were alleged to be secret, but were obtained via a Freedom of Information request.

In September 2012 Hoban was moved from the Treasury to the Department for Work and Pensions. The Work Capability Assessment for which Hoban had responsibility has been heavily criticised due to its failure rate of more than 30% reversals of decisions upon appeal and because "the descriptors used to qualify for long-term support are so limited that almost nobody does so." In July 2013, Hoban's department asked PricewaterhouseCoopers to "provide independent advice in relation to strengthening quality assurance processes across all its health and disability assessments.". Hoban received £22,507 in non-cash donations from his former employer PricewaterhouseCoopers in 2009. Hoban left the Government front benches in October 2013.

Hoban voted against gay couples adopting children in 2002, and against the Employment Equality (Sexual Orientation) Regulations in 2003. In 2013, Hoban took part in a discussion about Russia's anti-gay legislation with actor Simon Callow and claimed "We have seen a change of people's attitudes in the UK and that's gathered momentum over time...you can have quite rapid change in these areas."

During the MPs expenses scandal newspapers reported on Hoban's £12,000 furniture bill including £35 on a toilet-roll holder, £10 on a chrome shower rack and £79 on four silk cushions on his second-home allowance. Hoban said, "At the time I made these claims I believed that they were reasonable and within the spirit of the rules."

Hoban announced that he would be standing down at the 2015 general election, and it was reported that he had already taken up board-level roles at three businesses.

== Post-Parliamentary career ==
In June 2018, then Chancellor of the Exchequer Philip Hammond announced the creation of a Financial Services Skills Taskforce to assess the long-term skills needs of the UK financial services sector, amid rapid technological and social change. Hoban was appointed chair of the taskforce.

As a result of the taskforce, the Financial Services Skills Commission was formed in May 2020 and Hoban was appointed chair; a position he retains as of 2025.

== Personal life ==
He has been married to Fiona Jane Barrett since August 1994 and they live in his former constituency, at Locks Heath. He has been an associate of the Institute of Chartered Accountants in England & Wales since 1988. Hoban is a Roman Catholic and attends mass regularly at St. Margaret Mary's Catholic Parish in Park Gate.

Parliament of the United Kingdom
Preceded by Peter Lloyd	Member of Parliament for Fareham; 2001–2015	Succeeded by Suella Fernandes
Political offices
Preceded by Stephen Timms	Financial Secretary to the Treasury; 2010–2012	Succeeded by Greg Clark
Preceded by The Lord Myners	City Minister; 2010–2012	Succeeded by Greg Clark
Preceded by Chris Grayling	Minister of State for Employment; 2012–2013	Succeeded by Esther McVey
