= Oxford Odissi Festival =

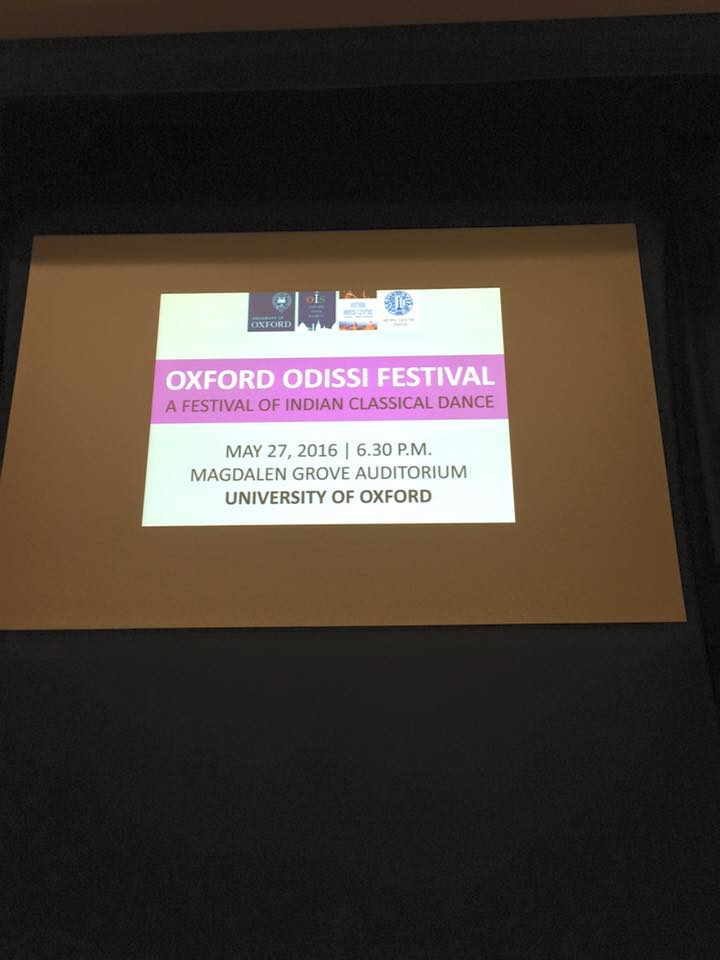
- Genre: Indian classical dance
- Dates: Annually, last week of May
- Locations: University of Oxford, Oxford, United Kingdom
- Years active: 2015 - Present
- Founders: Baisali Mohanty

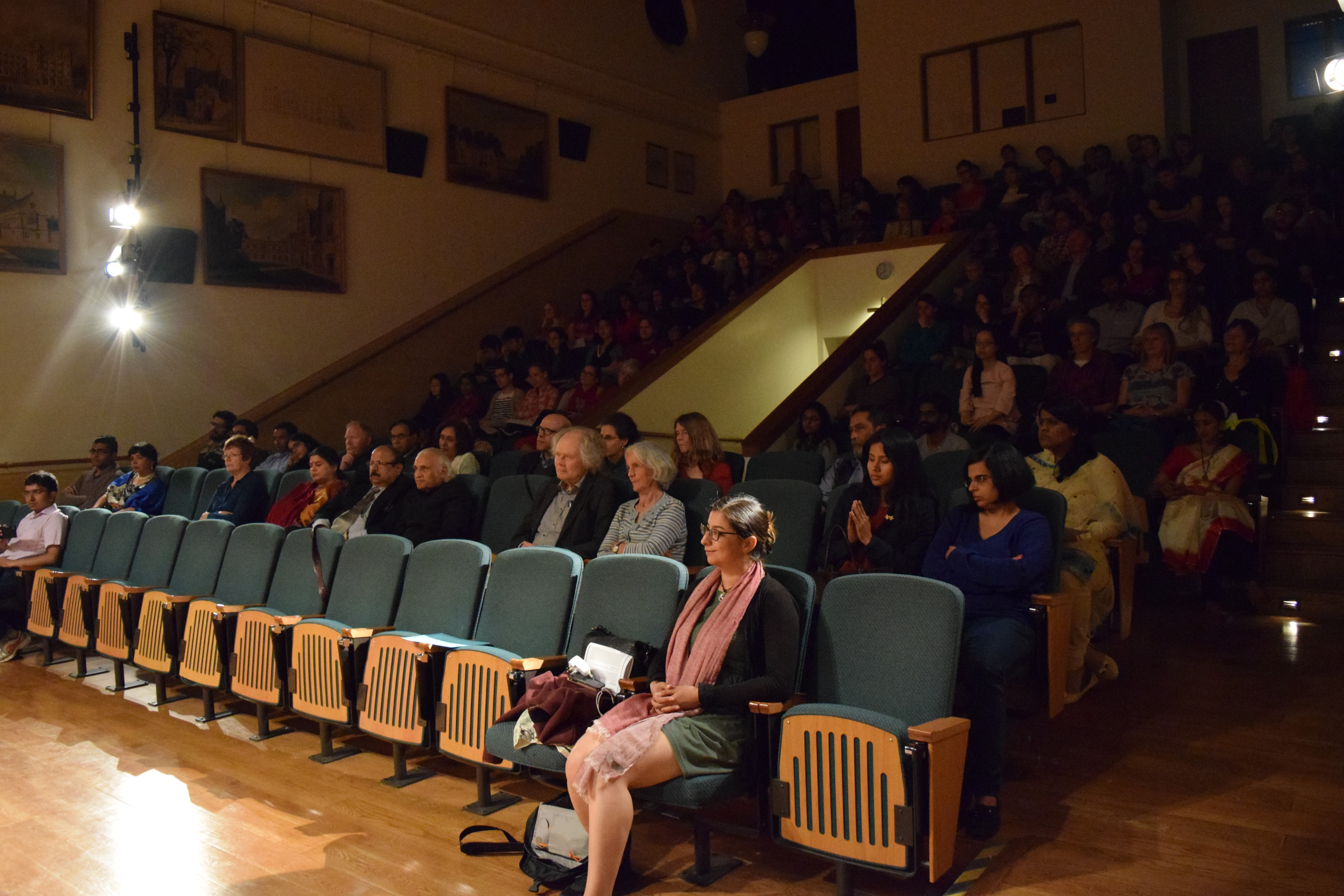
Audience enjoying a performance at the 2016 Oxford Odissi Festival held on May 27 at University of Oxford.

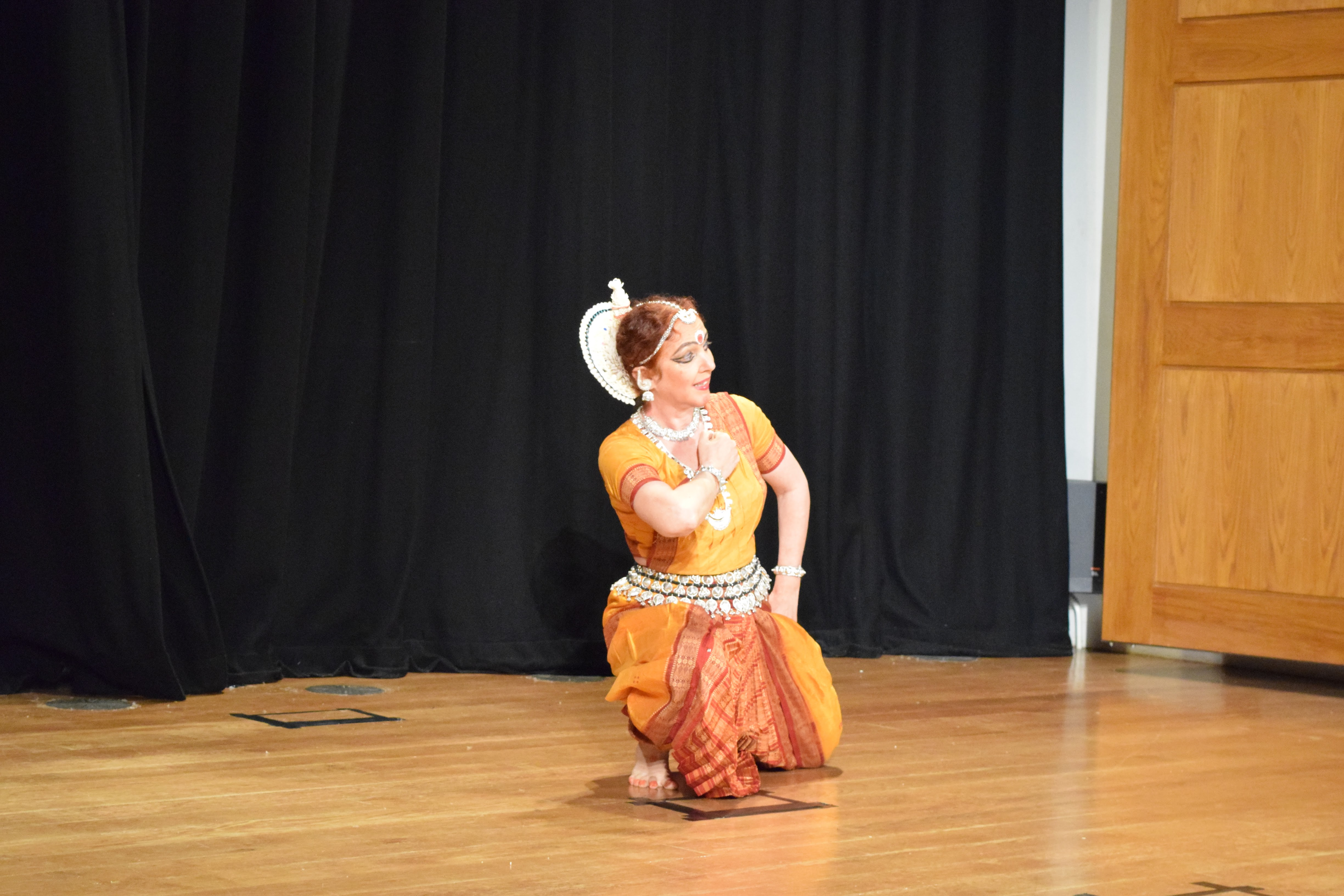
Renowned dancer and choreographer Ileana Citaristi performing at Oxford Odissi Festival held on May 27, 2016, at University of Oxford.

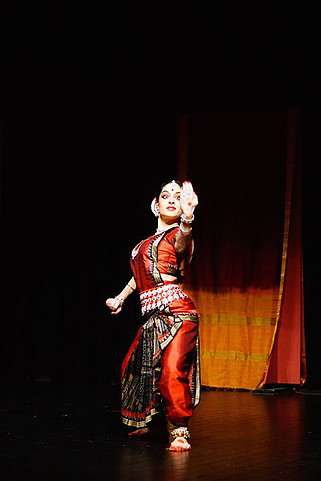
A performance at the festival held on February 11, 2017, at the auditorium of St John's College, Oxford.

Oxford Odissi Festival is an annual Indian classical dance festival held at University of Oxford, United Kingdom.

The festival was founded by Indian dancer and choreographer Baisali Mohanty in 2015 and is organised by Oxford Odissi Centre in association with the High Commission of India to the United Kingdom.

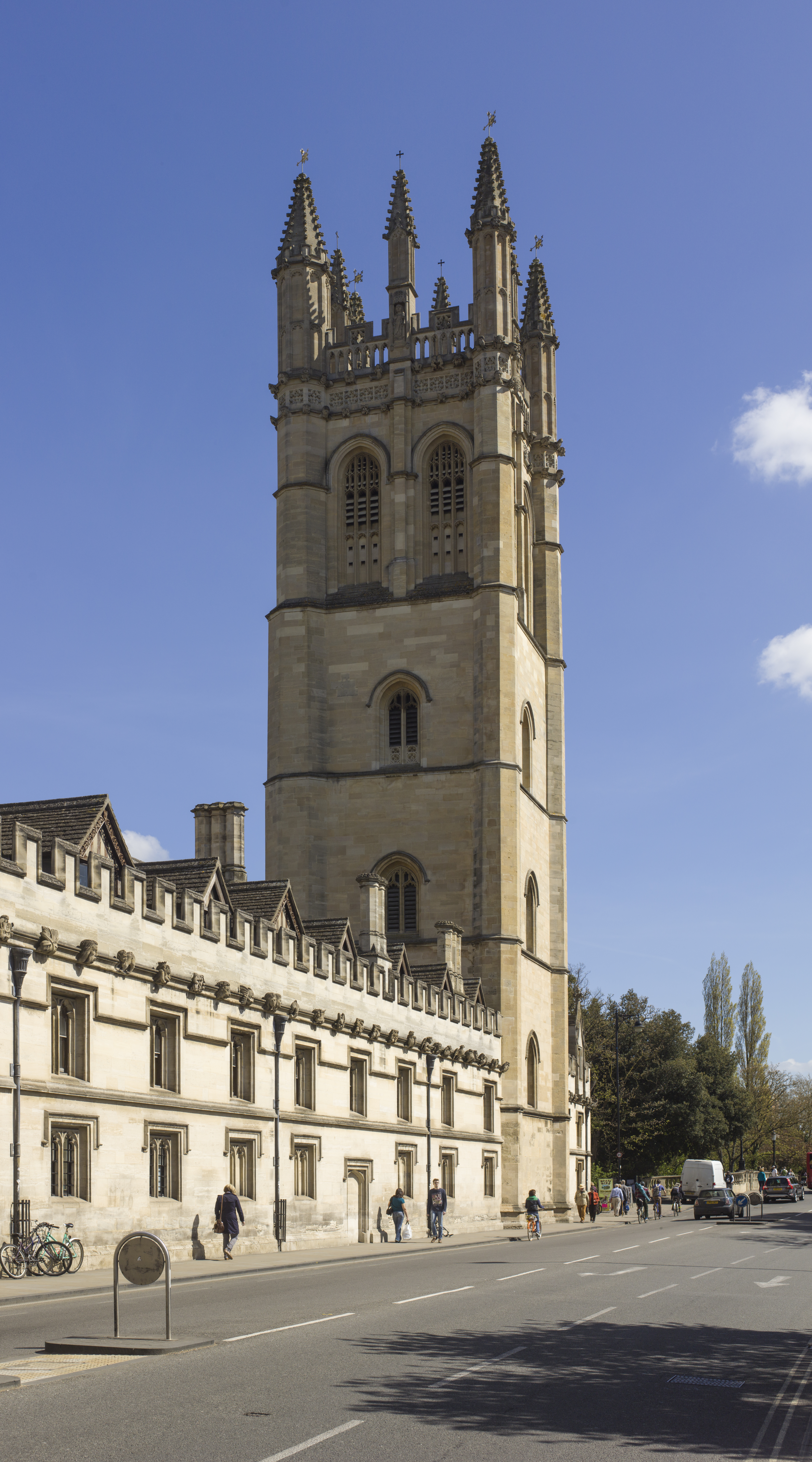
Magdalen College of University of Oxford, the venue for the festival

Beside exhibiting new and innovative choreographies in Odissi, the festival showcases all forms of Indian classical dance.

== History ==
The festival was conceptualised by Baisali Mohanty, a master's degree student at University of Oxford and a classical dancer and choreographer, to help popularise Odissi and other forms of Indian classical dance at one of the premier seat of learning.

The first edition of the festival was held on May 27, 2016, at the Grove Auditorium of Magdalen College, University of Oxford.

== Festival Programme ==
The festival hosts solo, duet and group choreographies. A major attraction of the festival is a fusion featuring Odissi, Kathak, Bharata Natyam and Mohiniyattam, highlighting the interconnectedness that runs through this different dance forms, as a reflection of the underlying unity among diverse Indian culture.
