= Baisali Mohanty =

Odissi dancer

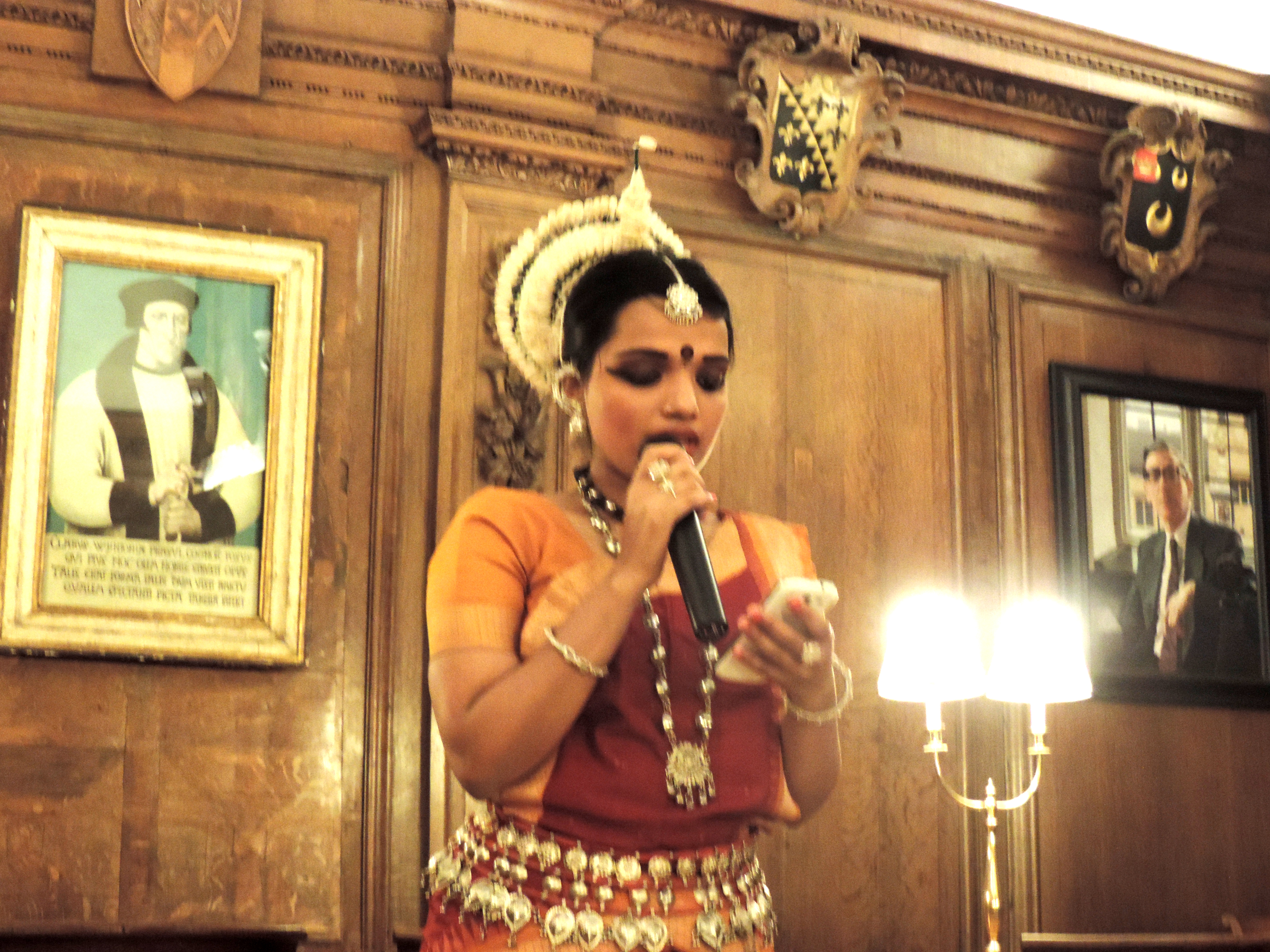
- Mohanty giving a talk on Odissi dance at Oxford University
- Born: 5 August 1994 (age 32); Puri, Odisha, India
- Education: University of Oxford, United Kingdom; Lady Shri Ram College for Women, Delhi
- Occupations: Diplomat, United Nations official, author, Indian classical dancer
- Organization: United Nations
- Works: Nuclear Diplomacy

Baisali Mohanty (born 5 August 1994) is an international diplomat and United Nations official, author, Indian classical dancer and analyst of foreign and public policy. She is a regular contributor on foreign policy and strategic affairs to several prestigious international publications including American business magazine Forbes, The Huffington Post, The Diplomat and openDemocracy, London.

She is the founder of Oxford Odissi Centre that is involved in promotion and training of Odissi dance at University of Oxford and other leading institutions in the United Kingdom.

She has been ALC Global Fellow for the year 2015–16 affiliated to University of Oxford.

In 2022, she was appointed as Special Envoy to Romania to coordinate evacuation from the war-hit Ukraine.

== Early life and education ==
Baisali Mohanty was born on 5 August 1994 in Puri, Odisha, to renowned feminist, poet and author Manasi Pradhan and Radha Binod Mohanty, an electrical engineer from the Indian Institute of Technology.

She was educated at Blessed Sacrament High School Puri and KIIT International School, Bhubaneswar. She received her bachelor's degree in Politics and International Relations from the Lady Shri Ram College for Women, Delhi.

She earned her master's degree from University of Oxford with first division writing her dissertation on nuclear diplomacy.

== Dancing career ==
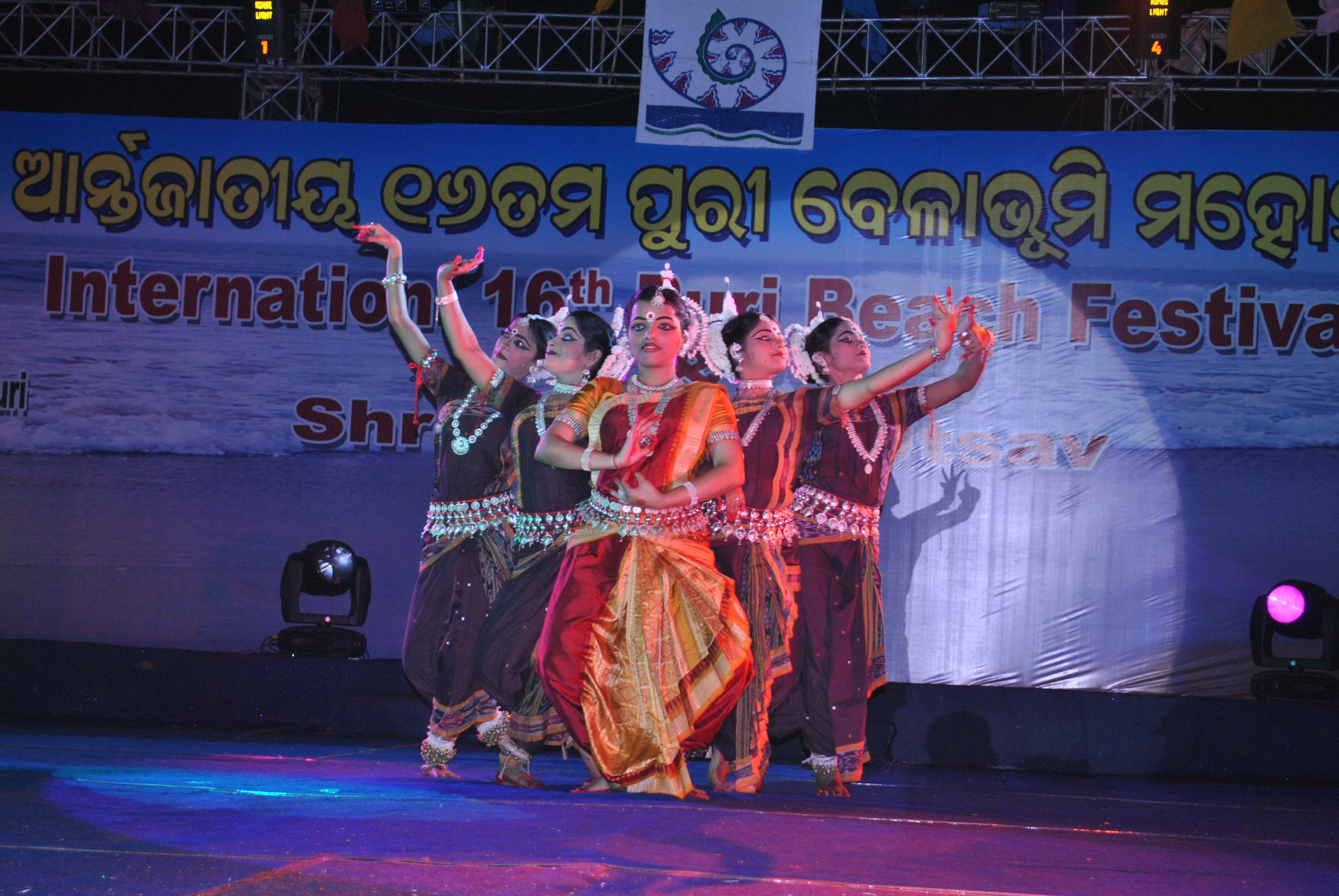
Baisali Mohanty & Troupe performing at 16th International Beach Festival on 24 November 2010.

Baisali Mohanty received her training in Odissi dance from renowned Odissi teacher Padma Shri Guru Gangadhar Pradhan for over a decade until his demise. She received advance training in Choreography from another eminent Odissi teacher and choreographer Padma Shri Guru Ileana Citaristi. she holds a Visharad Degree in Odissi dance with first class distinction.

She has been performing solo and group choreographies with her own dance company "Baisali Mohanty & Troupe" in international and national festivals for over fifteen years.

== Oxford Odissi Centre ==
In 2015, she founded the Oxford Odissi Centre at University of Oxford to popularise Indian classical dance at the varsity. Beside holding regular Odissi dance classes for members of University of Oxford, the centre also conducts Odissi dance workshops at other institutions including University of Cambridge, London School of Economics, University College London (UCL), King's College London, University of Manchester and University of Edinburgh among others.

She is also the founder of Oxford Odissi Festival, a first of its kind annual Indian classical dance festival held at the University of Oxford by Oxford Odissi Centre.

== Awards ==
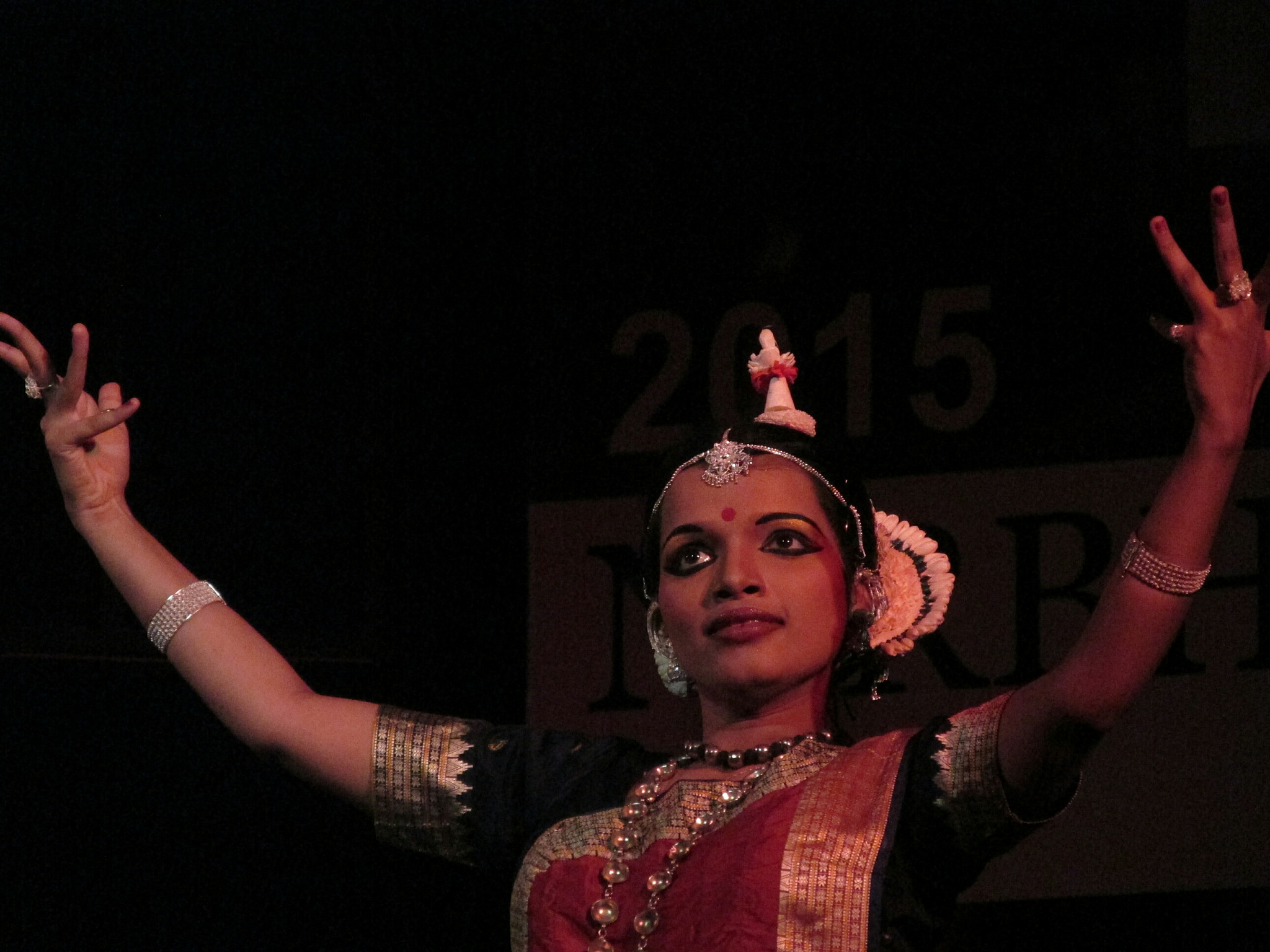
Baisali Mohanty giving a recital at 2015 Nirbhaya Samaroh held on 9 April at India Habitat Centre, New Delhi

In 2013, she was felicitated by India's National Commission for Women at New Delhi on occasion of International Women's Day for her outstanding achievement. In the same year, her dance composition paying tribute to the 2012 Delhi gang rape victim won her the top prize at Delhi University dance contest across all categories.

In 2017, she was conferred with the prestigious Aarya Award for her contribution to Indian classical dance by 2014 Nobel Peace Prize winner Kailash Satyarthi.

== See also ==
- List of dancers
- Indian women in dance
