= Oxford Odissi Centre =

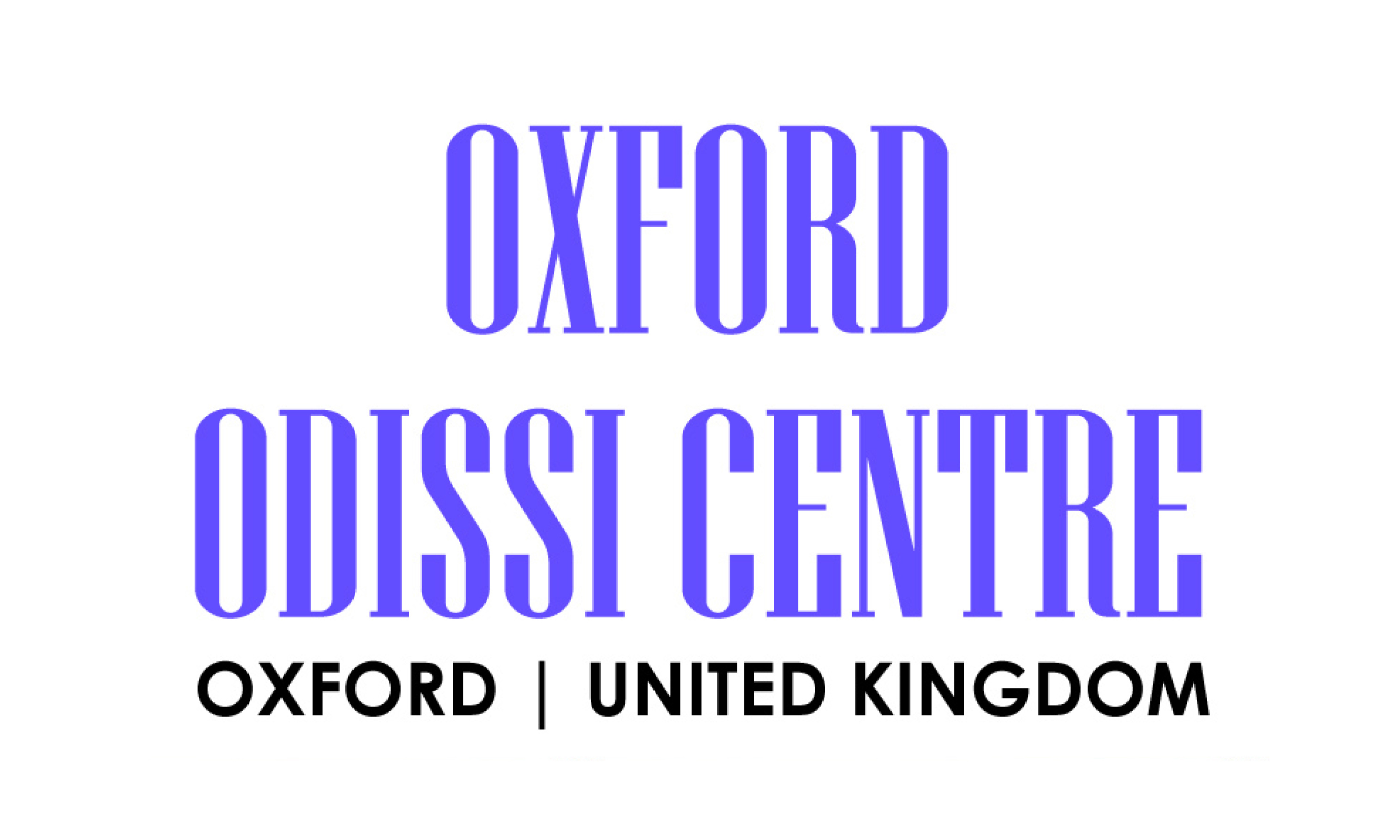
- Official Logo of Oxford Odissi Centre
- Formation: 2015
- Headquarters: Oxford, United Kingdom
- Location: Linton Road, Oxford OX2 6UD.
- Region served: Worldwide
- Founder: Baisali Mohanty
- Affiliations: University of Oxford

The Oxford Odissi Centre is a non-sports society of the University of Oxford, United Kingdom. The centre aims to promote and educate about Odissi, one of the oldest Indian classical dances.

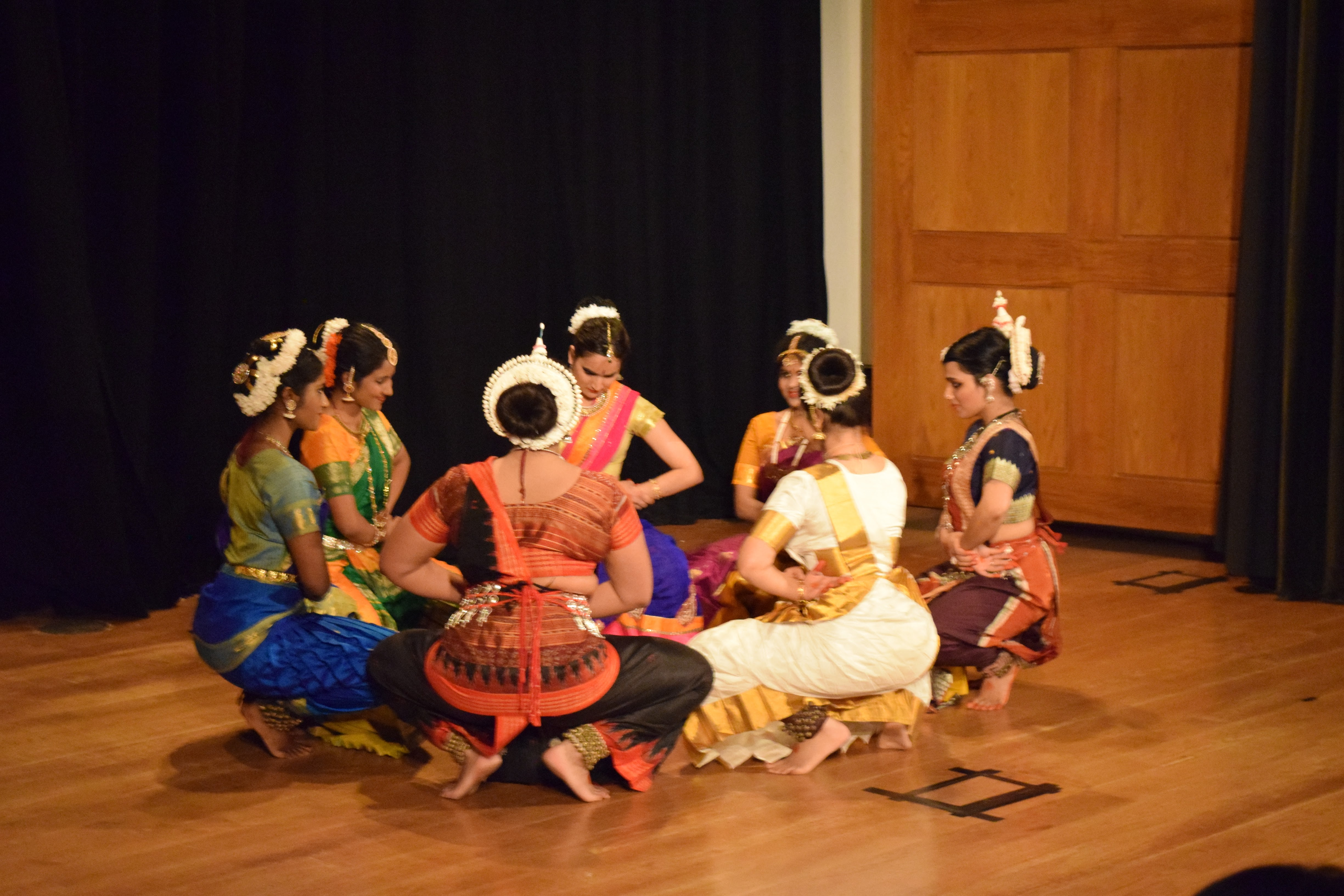
Members of Oxford Odissi Centre giving a performance at Magdalen College, Oxford's Grove Auditorium on May 27, 2016.

Beside holding regular Odissi dance classes for members of University of Oxford, the centre undertakes numerous activities to promote Odissi and other Indian classical dance at the university. It also conducts Odissi dance workshops at other leading institutions including University of Cambridge, London School of Economics, University College London, King's College London, University of Manchester, and University of Edinburgh.

The centre, in association with the High Commission of India to the United Kingdom, organizes the Oxford Odissi Festival, an annual festival of Indian classical dance at the University of Oxford.

== History ==
The centre was founded in 2015 by Baisali Mohanty, a post-graduate student at University of Oxford and a classical dancer and choreographer. The centre was registered with the Proctor’s Office and officially inducted as a society of the University of Oxford in 2016.

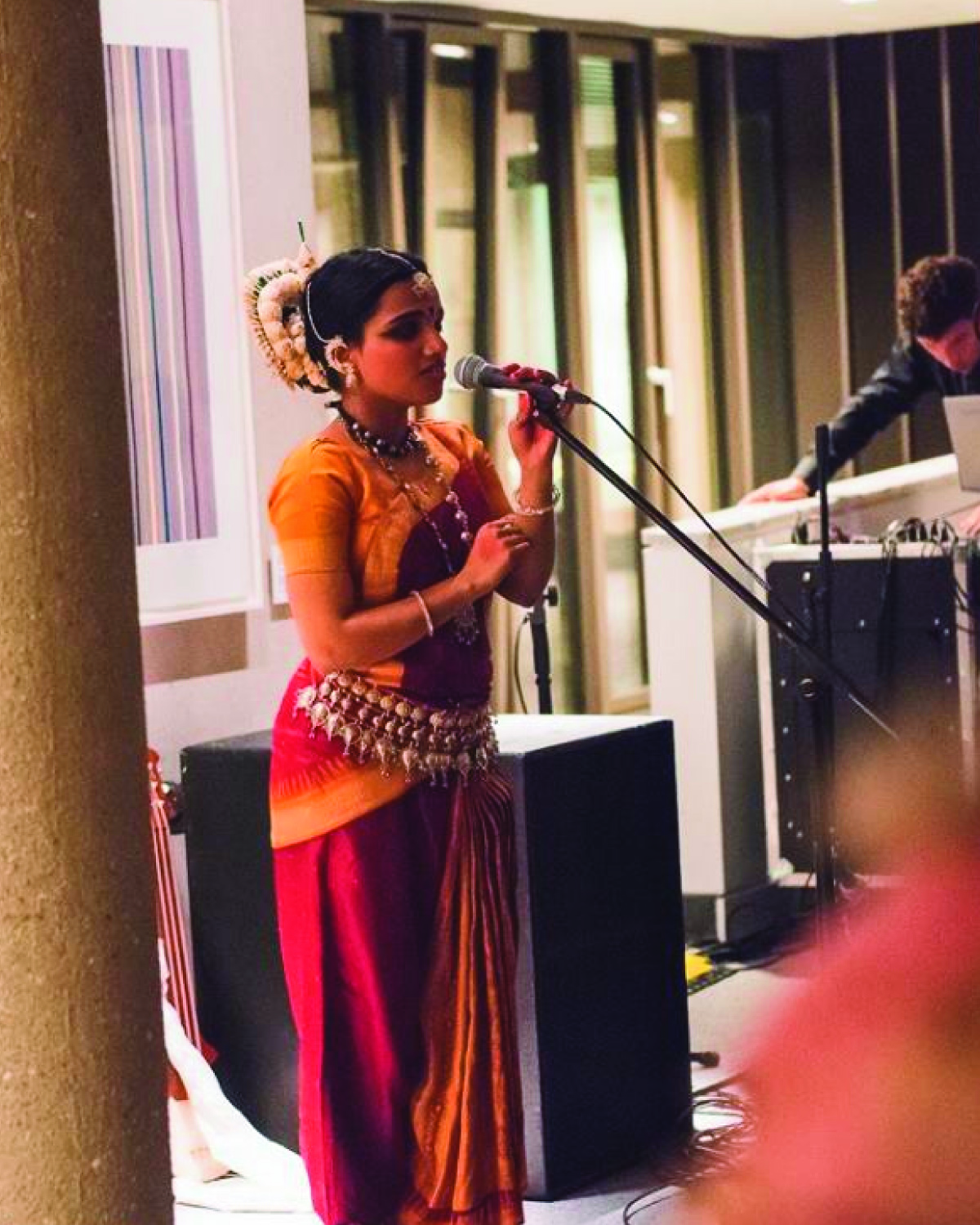
Oxford Odissi Centre presentation at Wolfson College, Oxford’s 50th Anniversary Ball held on 25 June 2016.

== Activities ==
The centre serves as an advance centre for learning Odissi dance at University of Oxford. It holds regular Odissi classes at several colleges of University of Oxford. Modules are offered to both fresher and advanced learners and stretches from one term to six terms.

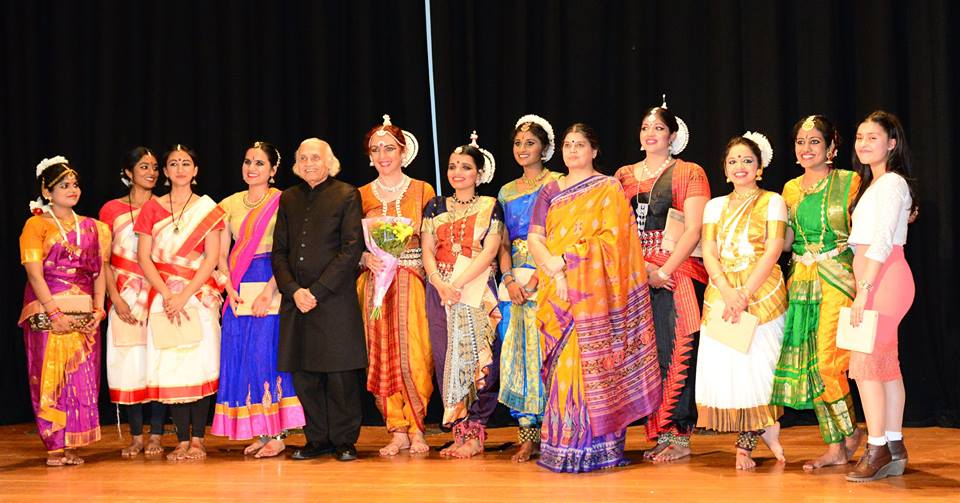
Noted dance critic Sunil Kothari, noted dancer Ileana Citaristi and the culture secretary of the High Commission of India to the United Kingdom with performers of Oxford Odissi Centre at the closing evening of 2016 Oxford Odissi Festival.

Besides dance instruction, the centre undertakes numerous activities to promote Odissi and other Indian classical dance at the university. Activities include organizing dance events, exhibitions, symposiums, conferences, and talks. The centre also maintains a team of dancers and choreographers to undertake performance on invitation.

It also conducts Odissi workshops and performances at several Russell Group member universities in United Kingdom.

== Administration ==
The administration of Oxford Odissi Centre is managed by a 10-member committee elected by the members of the centre and administered in consonance with the regulations for the societies of University of Oxford published periodically in the Proctors’ and Assessor’s Memorandum.

The 10-member committee elected for 2016 includes, among others, eminent economist Professor Matthew McCartney, Director of South Asian Studies, University of Oxford as Senior Member and Baisali Mohanty as President.

== Membership ==
Only members of University of Oxford are eligible for membership of Oxford Odissi Centre.

However, the committee may also, at its discretion, admit members of Permanent Private Halls and members of Ruskin College, Ripon College Cuddesdon, Oxford Institute of Legal Practice, and the Westminster Institute of Oxford Brookes University who are registered for qualifications validated by the University of Oxford.

== Oxford Odissi Festival ==
Oxford Odissi Festival is an annual Indian classical dance festival organised by Oxford Odissi Centre at the University of Oxford, United Kingdom. Beside exhibiting new and innovative choreographies in Odissi, the festival showcases all forms of Indian classical dance.
