= Chhau =

Indian semi classical martial dance originating in East India

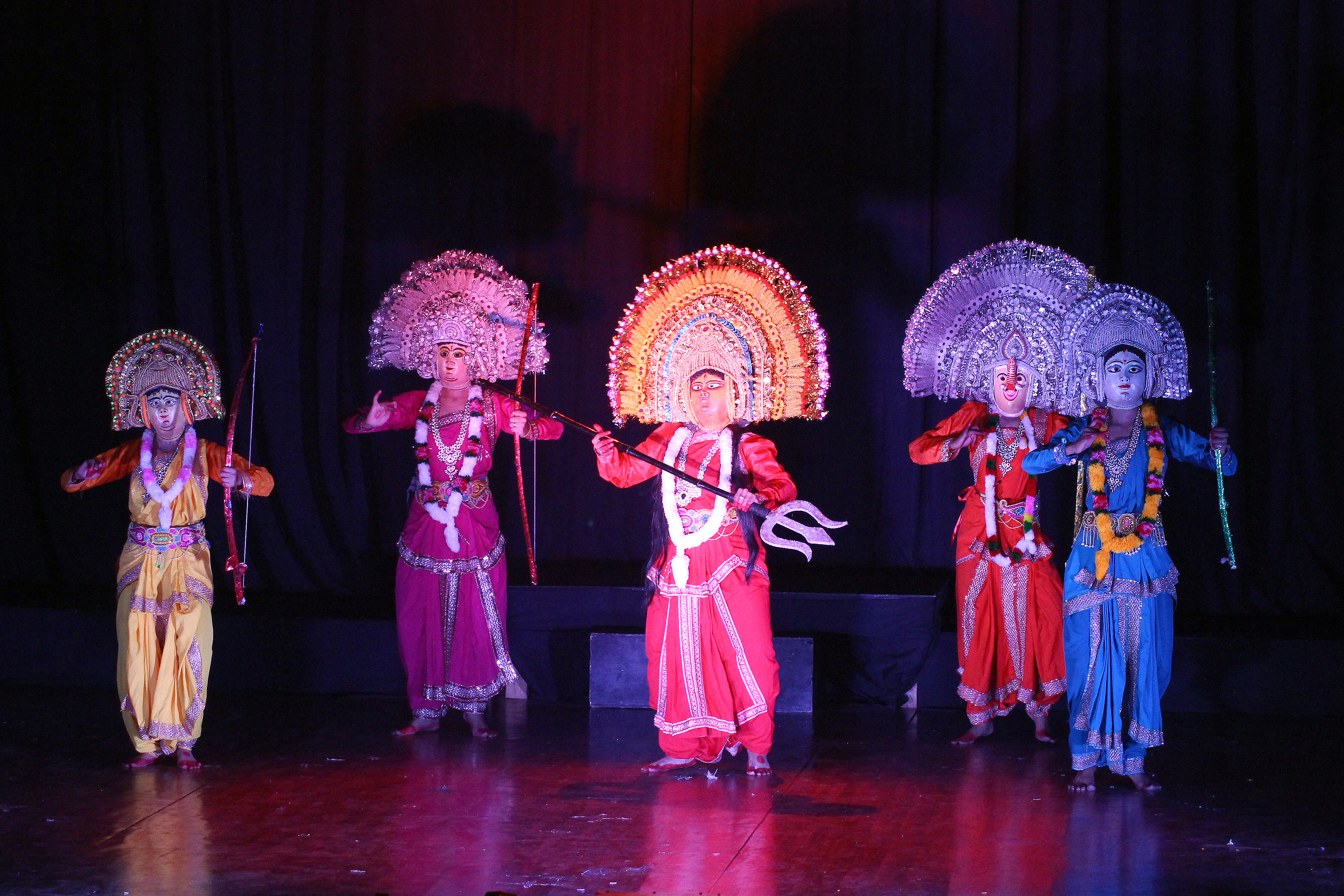
- Chhau performing artists
- Genre: Semi Indian classical dance
- Origin: Jharkhand, Odisha and West Bengal, India

Chhau, also spelled Chhou, is a semi classical Indian dance with martial and folk traditions. It is found in three styles named after the location where they are performed, i.e. the Purulia Chhau of West Bengal, the Seraikella Chhau of Jharkhand and the Mayurbhanj Chhau of Odisha.

The dance ranges from celebrating martial arts, acrobatics and athletics performed in festive themes of a folk dance, to a structured dance with religious themes found in Shaivism, Shaktism and Vaishnavism. The costumes vary between the styles, with Purulia and Serakeilla using masks to identify the character. The stories enacted by Chhau dancers include those from the Hindu epics the Ramayana and the Mahabharata, the Puranas and other Indian literature.

The dance is traditionally an all males troupe, regionally celebrated particularly during spring every year, and may be a syncretic dance form that emerged from a fusion of classical Hindu dances and the traditions of ancient regional tribes. The dance brings together people from diverse socio-economic backgrounds in a festive and religious spirit.

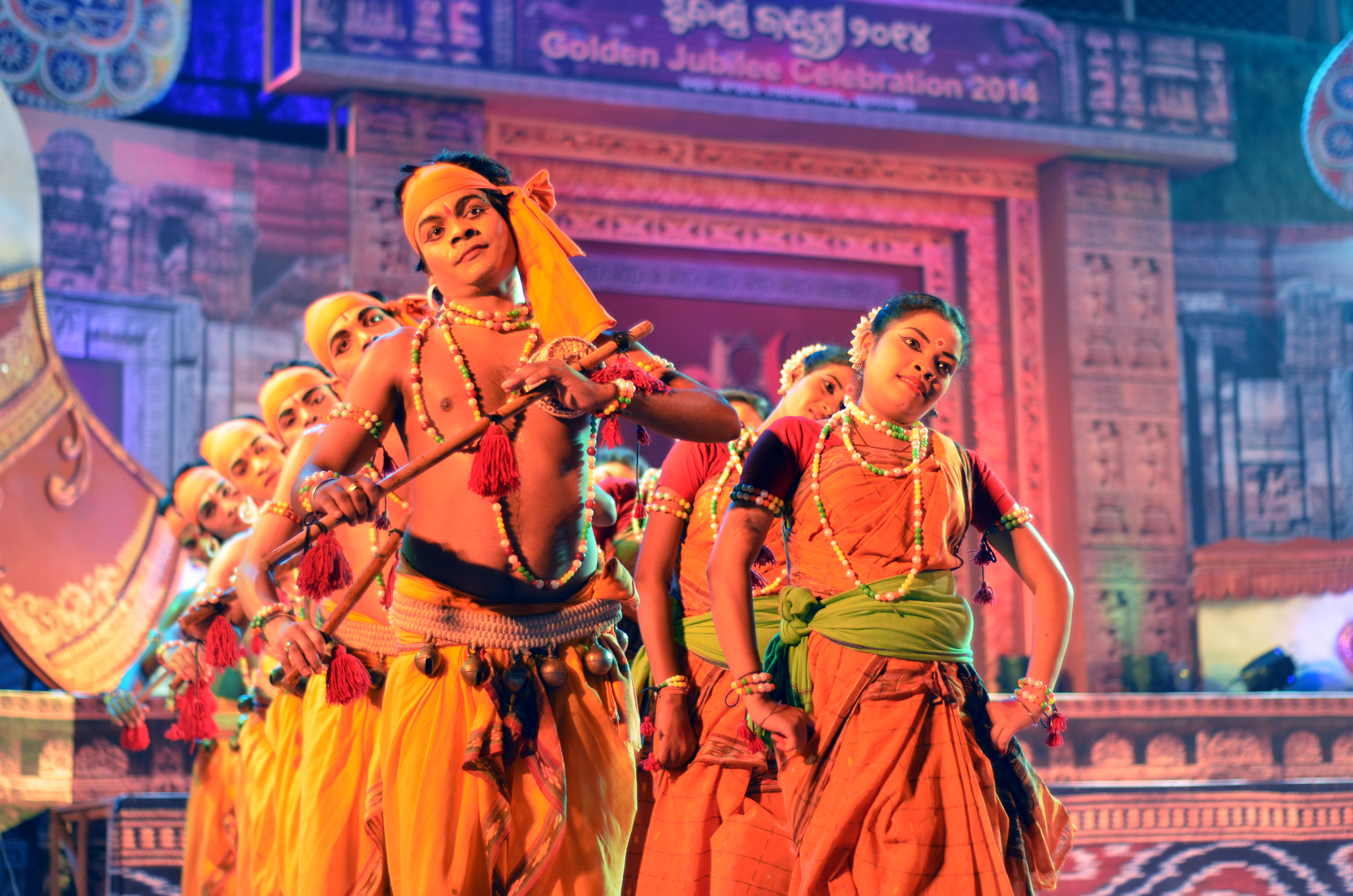
Mayurbhanj Chhau artists performing to a Vaishnavite theme at Bhubaneswar, Odisha

A video of Chau dance in Purulia, West Bengal

== Etymology ==
Chhau is a dance style originating from the regions of East India. It may have been derived from Sanskrit Chāya (shadow, image or mask). Others link it to the Sanskrit root Chadma (disguise), yet others such as Sitakant Mahapatra suggest it is derived from Chhauni (military camp, armour, stealth) in Odia language.

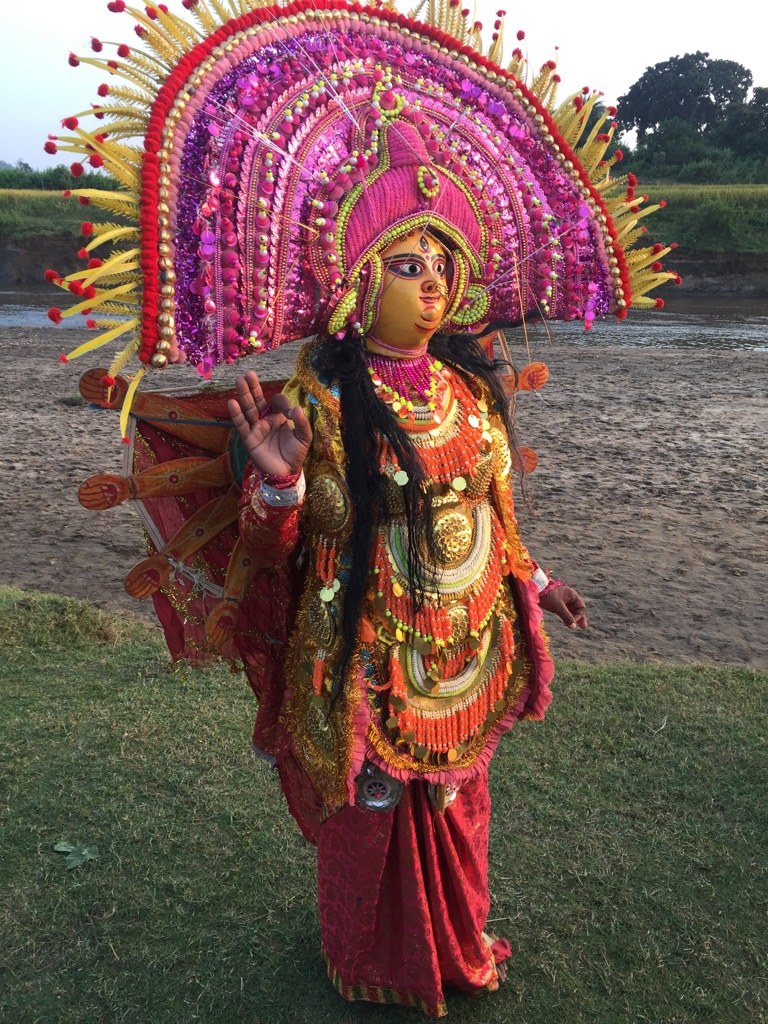
A Chhau dancer in Bagmundi, West Bengal in role of goddess Durga.

== Features of Chhau ==
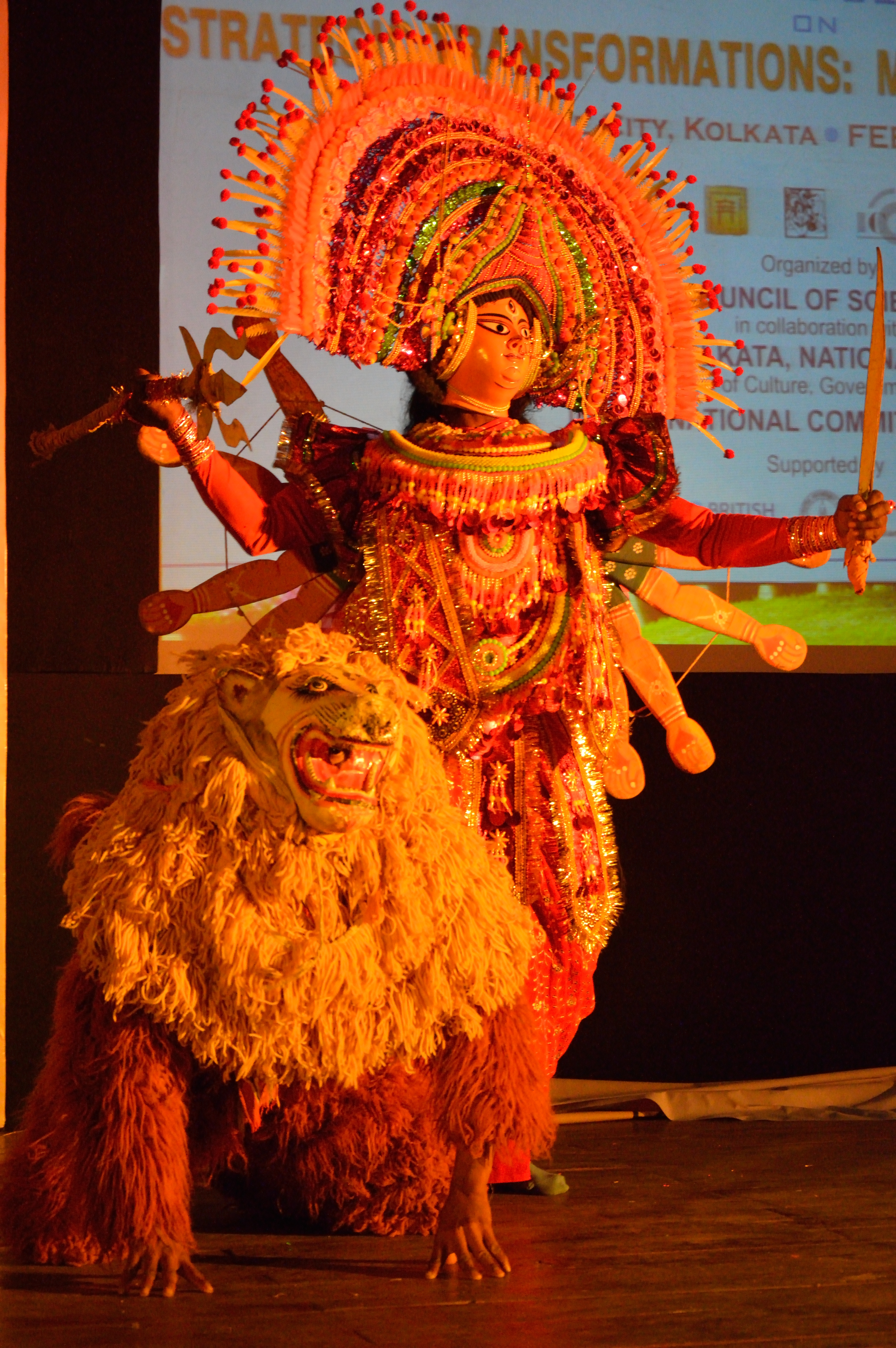
A Shaktism themed costumes for Chhau dance (Durga with Lion, Purulia style Chhau).

The Chhau dance is mainly performed during festivals in the region of Jharkhand, West Bengal and Odisha, especially the spring festival of Chaitra Parva and in which the whole community participates. The Purulia Chhau dance is celebrated during the Sun festival.

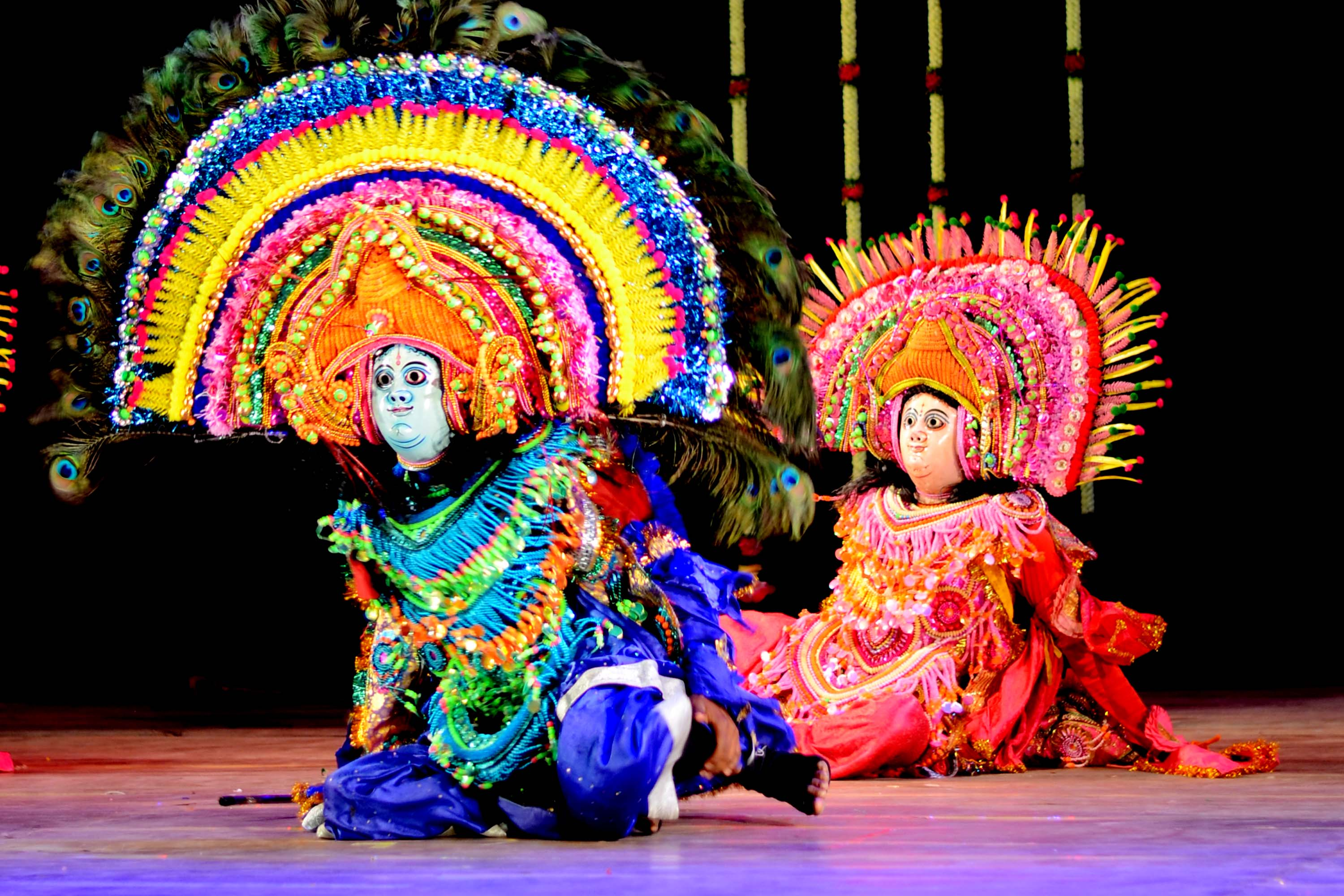
Artists from the Purulia district of West Bengal perform the Chhau dance

Masks form an integral part of Chhau dance in Purulia and Seraikella styles. The knowledge of dance, music and mask-making is transmitted orally. The Chhau dance found in northern Odisha does not use masks during the dance, but they do when the artists first appear on the stage for introduction to the audience.

The two styles of Chhau dance that use masks, blend within it forms of both dance and martial practices employing mock combat techniques (called khel), stylised gaits of birds and animals (called chalis and topkas) and movements based on the chores of village housewives (called uflis). This form of the Chhau dance, states Mohan Khokar, has no ritual or ceremonial meaning, it is a form of community celebration and entertainment.

The dance is performed by male dancers, at night in an open space, called akhada or asar. The dance is rhythmic and set to traditional folk music, played on the reed pipes mohuri and shehnai. A variety of drums accompany the music ensemble including the dhol (a cylindrical drum), dhumsa (a large kettle drum) and kharka or chad-chadi. The themes for these dances include local legends, folklore and episodes from the Ramayana and Mahabharata and other abstract themes.

The precursors of Chhau dance (especially Purulia style) were not only Paika and Natua, but Nachni dance also played an important role in giving Chhau its present identity. Chhau dance borrows the female gaits and movements from the Nachni dance almost exclusively (Bhattacharya, 1983, Chakravarti, 2001, Kishore, 1985). The female dance elements in Chhau introduced the aspects of Lasya Bhava from the Natya Shastra that brought elegance, sensuality, and beauty in the dance form, whereas, the virile male dance movement is attributed to the Shiva's tandava style of dance (Bose 1991). There are different interpretations to tandava and lasya. I have above-mentioned the most commonly accepted definition of tandava and lasya above. Bose foregrounds the debate between the relation of lasya and tandava critically in his analysis of dance in Sanskrit texts. See Bose, Mandakranta.

== Three styles of Chhau ==
Ileana Citaristi performing Mayurbhanj Chhau (Shaivism theme).

The Seraikella Chhau developed in Seraikela, when it was under the rule of Kalinga's Gajapati Rule the present day administrative headquarters of the Seraikela Kharsawan district of Jharkhand, the Purulia Chhau in Purulia district of West Bengal and the Mayurbhanj Chhau in Mayurbhanj district of Odisha. The most prominent difference among the three subgenres is regarding the use of masks. While, the Seraikela and Purulia subgenres of Chhau use masks during the dance, the Mayurbhanj Chhau uses none.

The Seraikella Chhau's technique and repertoire were developed by the erstwhile nobility of this region who were both its performers and choreographers, and in the modern era people from all backgrounds dance it. The Seraikella Chhau is performed with symbolic masks, and the acting establishes the role the actor is playing. The Purulia Chhau uses extensive masks shaped in the form of the character being played; for example, a lion character has a face mask of lion and body costumes too with the actor walking on all fours. These masks are crafted by potters who make clay images of Hindu gods and goddesses and is primarily sourced from the Purulia district of West Bengal. In the Mayurbhanj Chhau is performed without masks and is technically similar to the Seraikella Chhau.

== Recognition ==
In 2010, the Chhau dance was inscribed in the UNESCO's Representative List of the Intangible Cultural Heritage of Humanity.

The Government of Odisha established the Government Chhau Dance Centre in 1960 in Seraikella and the Mayurbhanj Chhau Nritya Pratisthan at Baripada in 1962. These institutions engage in training involving local gurus, artists, patrons and representatives of Chhau institutions and sponsor performances. The Chaitra Parva festival, significant to the Chhau Dance, is also sponsored by the state government. The Sangeet Natak Akademi has established a National Centre for Chhau Dance at Baripada, Odisha.

== In popular culture ==
- The Hindi film Barfi! has several scenes that features the Purulia Chhau in it.

Chhau Dance of Purulia - Documentary - EZCC

- Eastern Zonal Cultural Centre, Kolkata, brings you the documentary. The video is a documentary on the Purulia Chhau of West Bengal. The Chhau is a semi-classical dance form from Eastern India which has tribal and folk origins.

== Chhau mask ==
Chhau masks and dancer of West Bengal

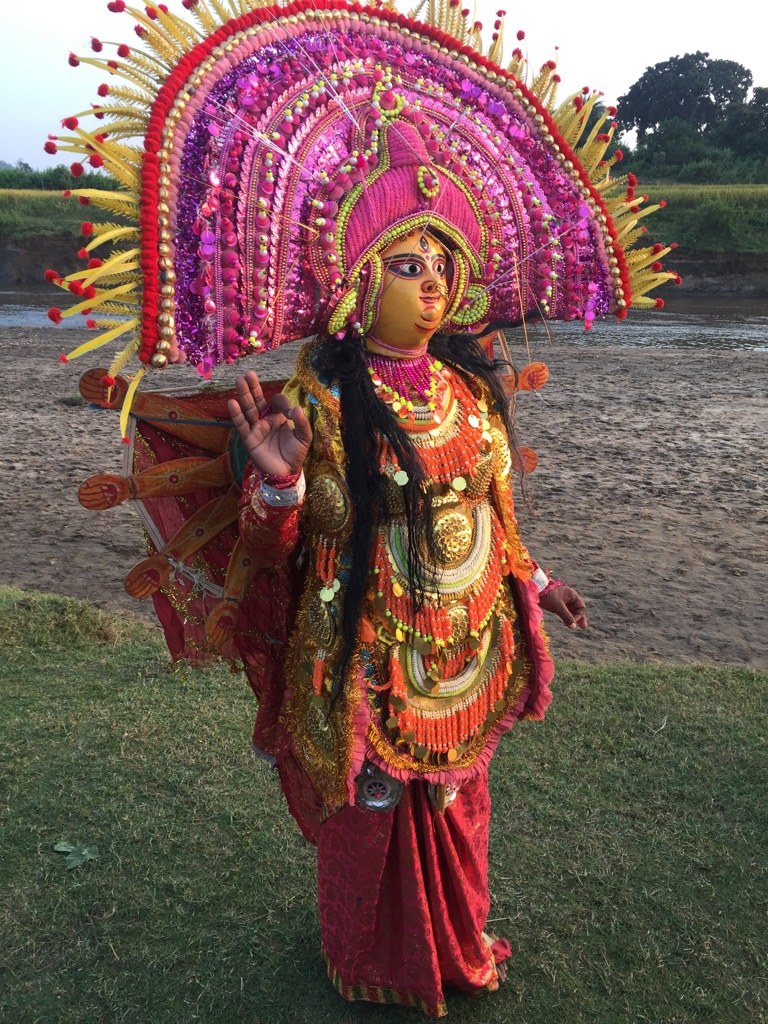
A Chhau dancer in Bagmundi

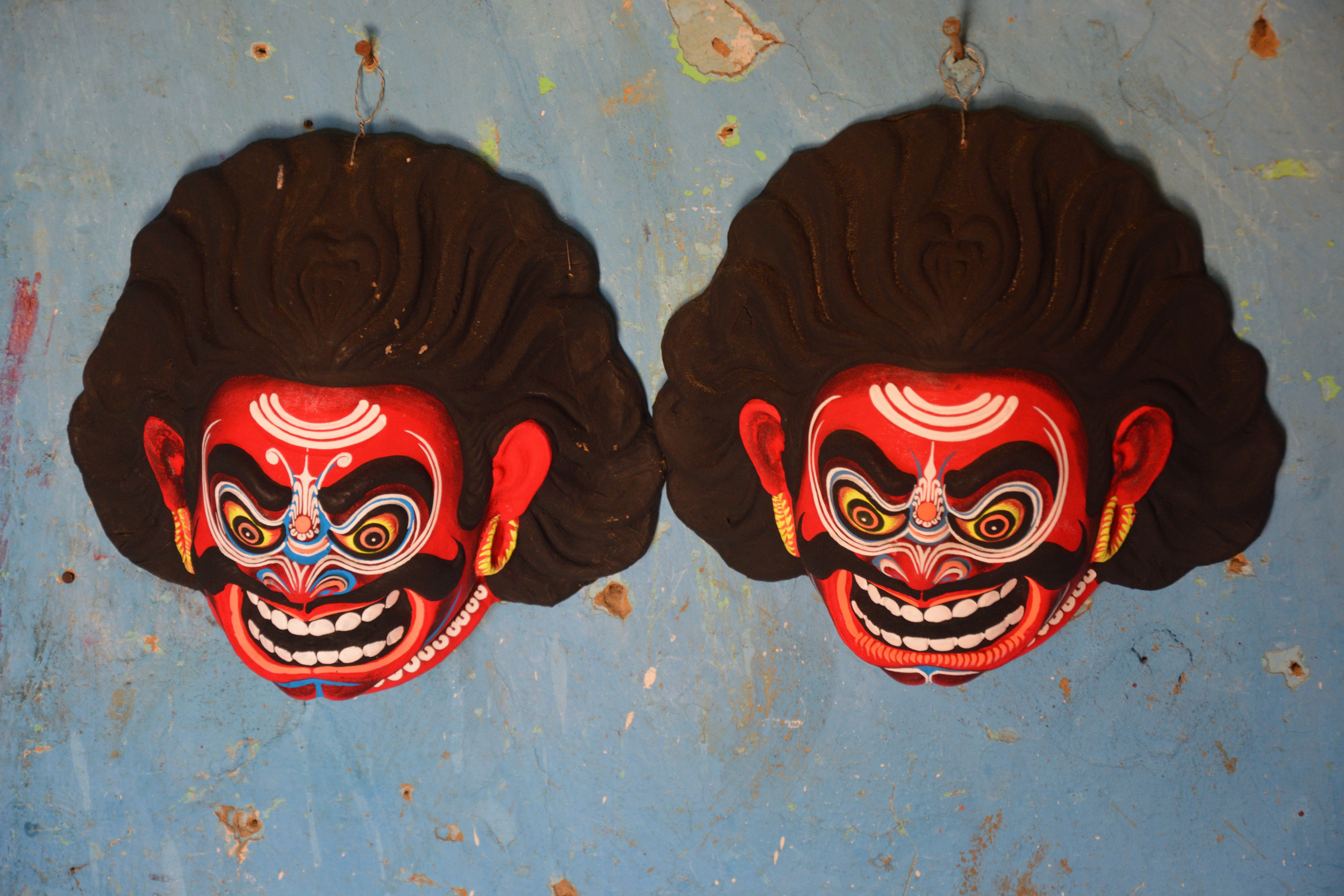
chhau mask

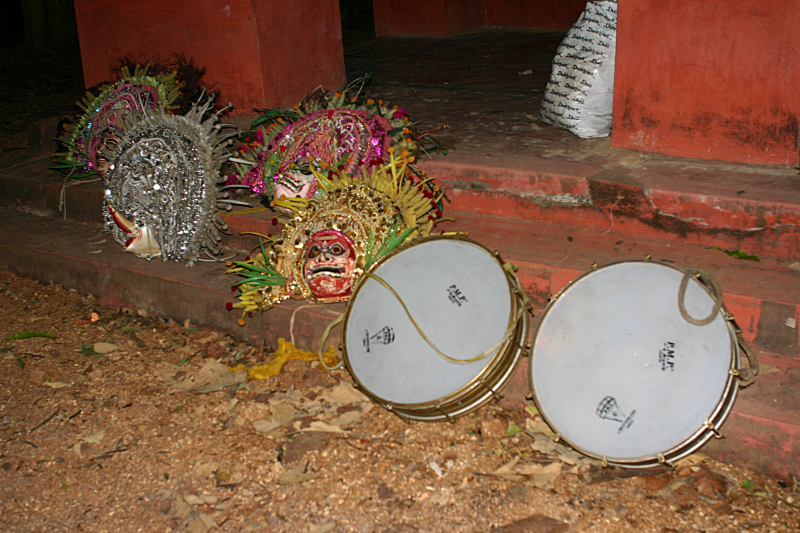
mask and musical instrument of chhau dance

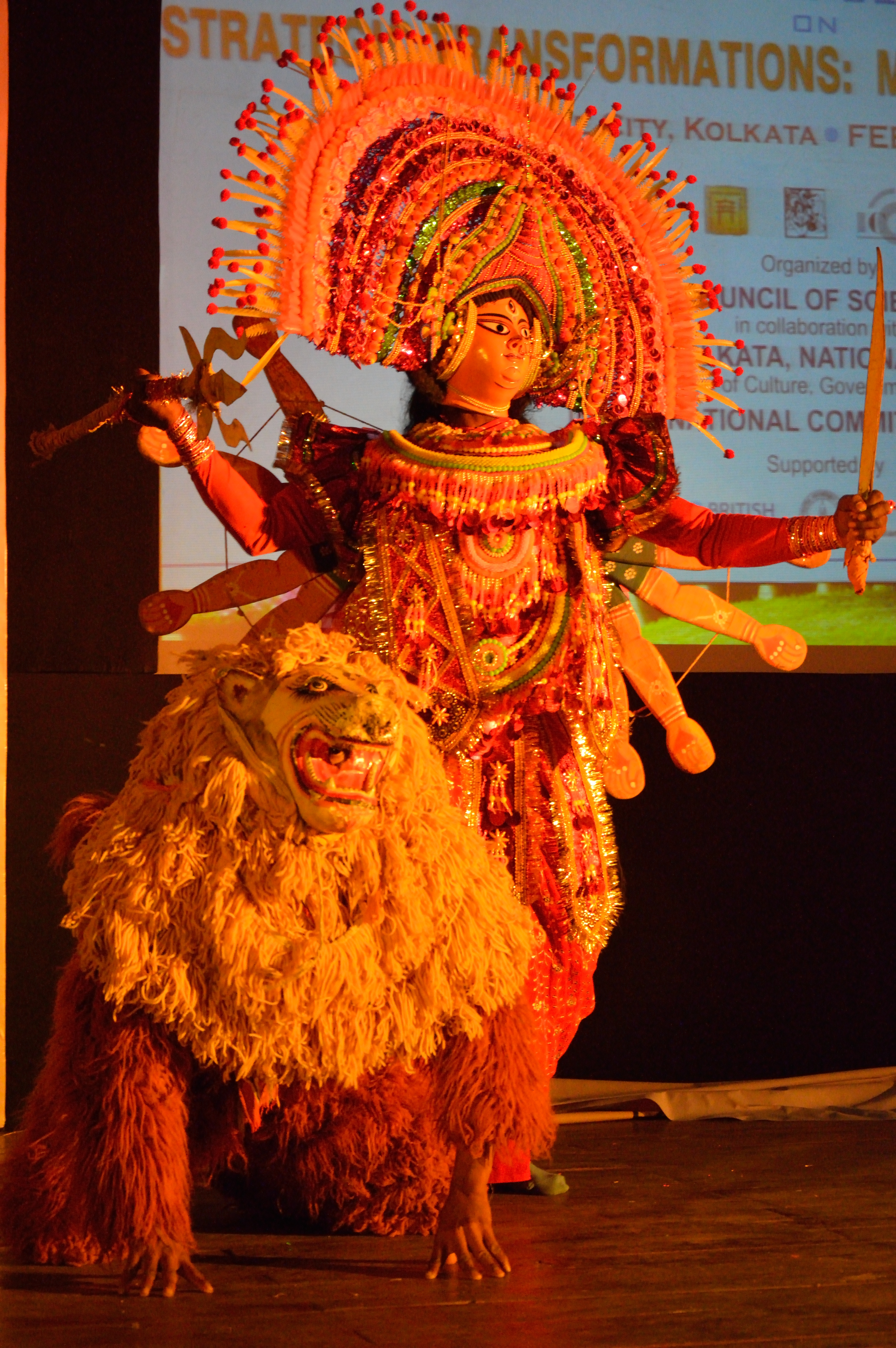
Durga with Lion, Purulia style Chhau

Purulia Chhau Dance is listed on UNESCO's world heritage list of dances. The main difference between the Purulia Chhau and Mayurbhanj Chhau is in the use of the mask. Purulia Chhau uses masks in dance, but Mayurbhanj Chhau does not have masks thereby adding facial expression with body movements and gestures. Traditionally, the chhau dance is held during mid-march when one agricultural circle ends and a new circle begins. Purulia Chhau dancers wear the earthy and theatrical mask which represent the mythological characters. After making the shape of mask with clay, it is coloured and decorated with Shola and other things.

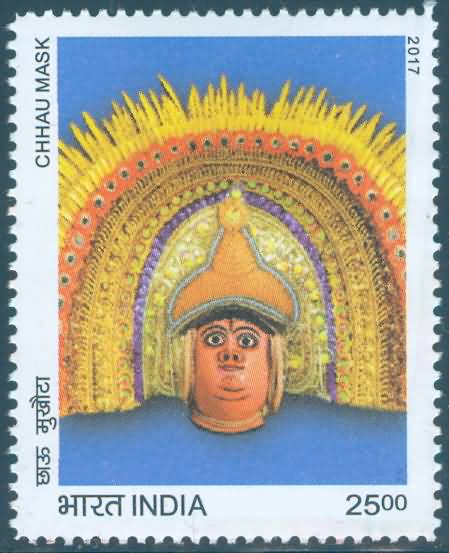
Chhau Mask of West Bengal in Indian Stamp, 2017

The Chhau mask of Purulia is registered under Geographical Indications. As the basic difference of Purulia Chhau the mask is unique and traditional.

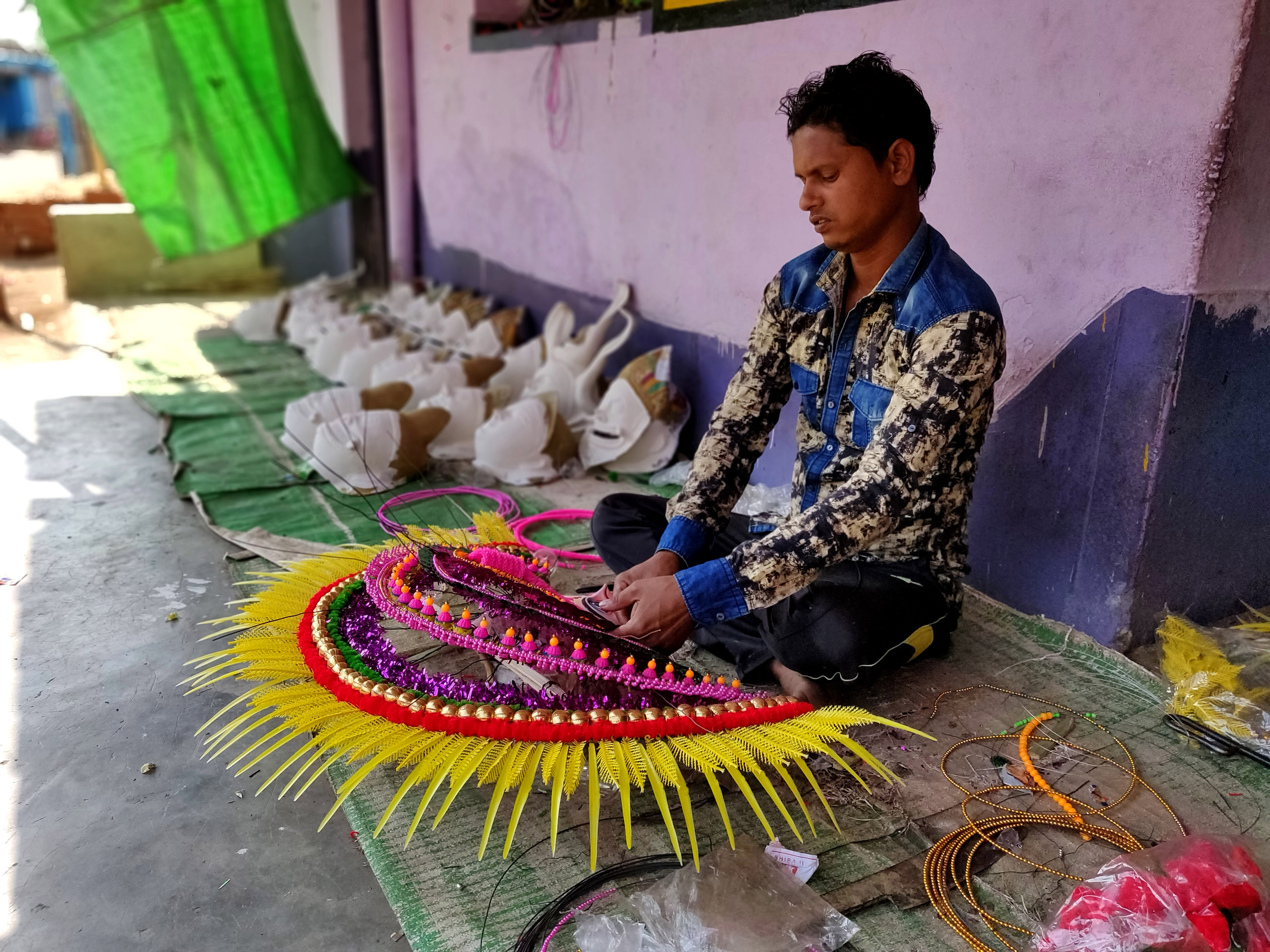
Chhau masks are being made in a household in Purulia

These chhau masks are made by the artists by the Sutradhar community. The making of a mask goes through various stages. 8-10 layers of soft paper, immersed in diluted glue, are pasted one after another on the mould before the mud mould is dusted with fine ash powder. The facial features are made of clay. A special layer of mud and cloth is applied and the mask is then sun-dried. After this, the mould is polished and the second round of sun drying is done before separating the layers of cloth and paper from the mould. After finishing and drilling of holes for the nose and eyes, the mask is coloured and decorated.

== Gallery ==
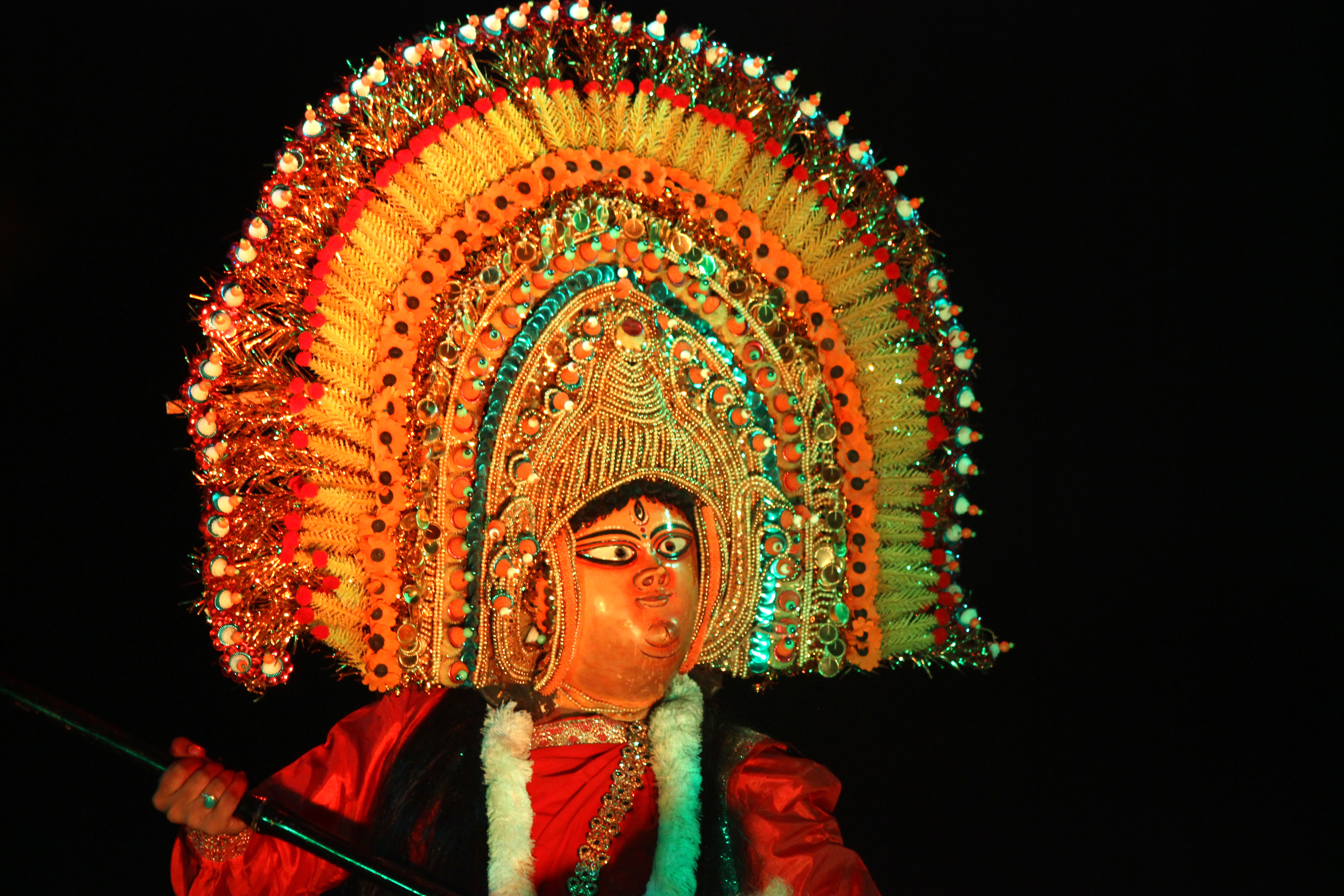
Chhau dance artist-female

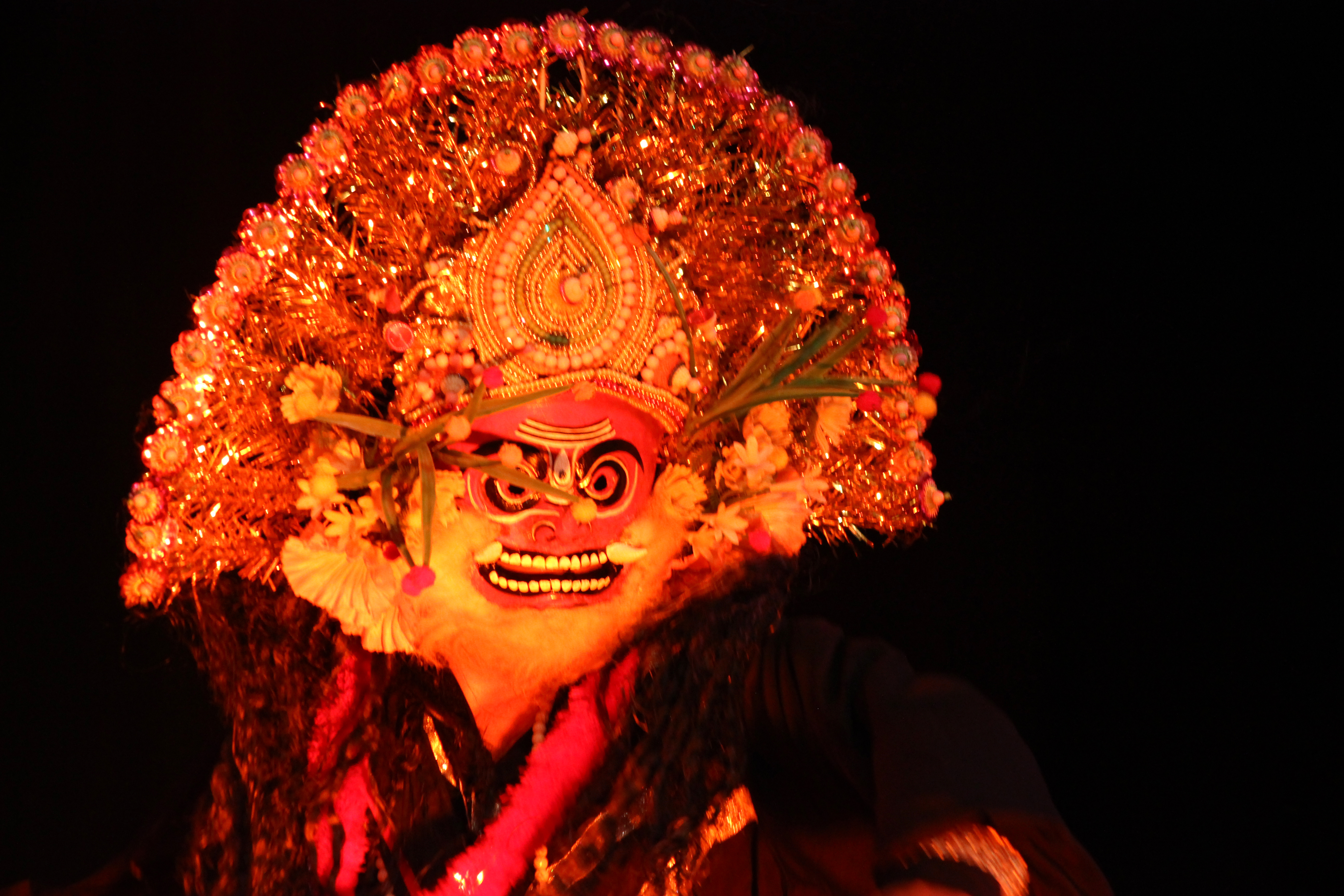
Chhau dance artist-male

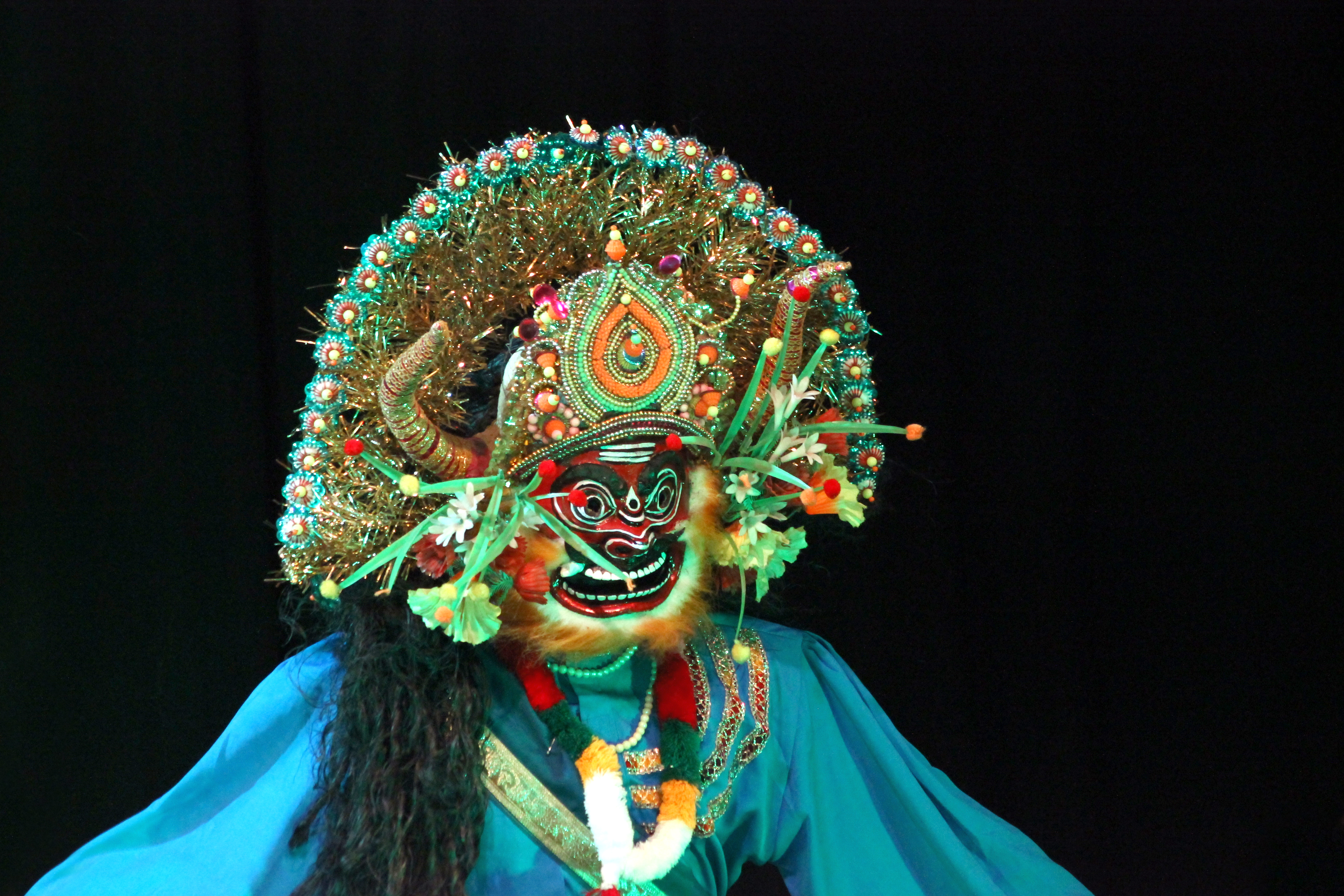
Chhau dance artist-male

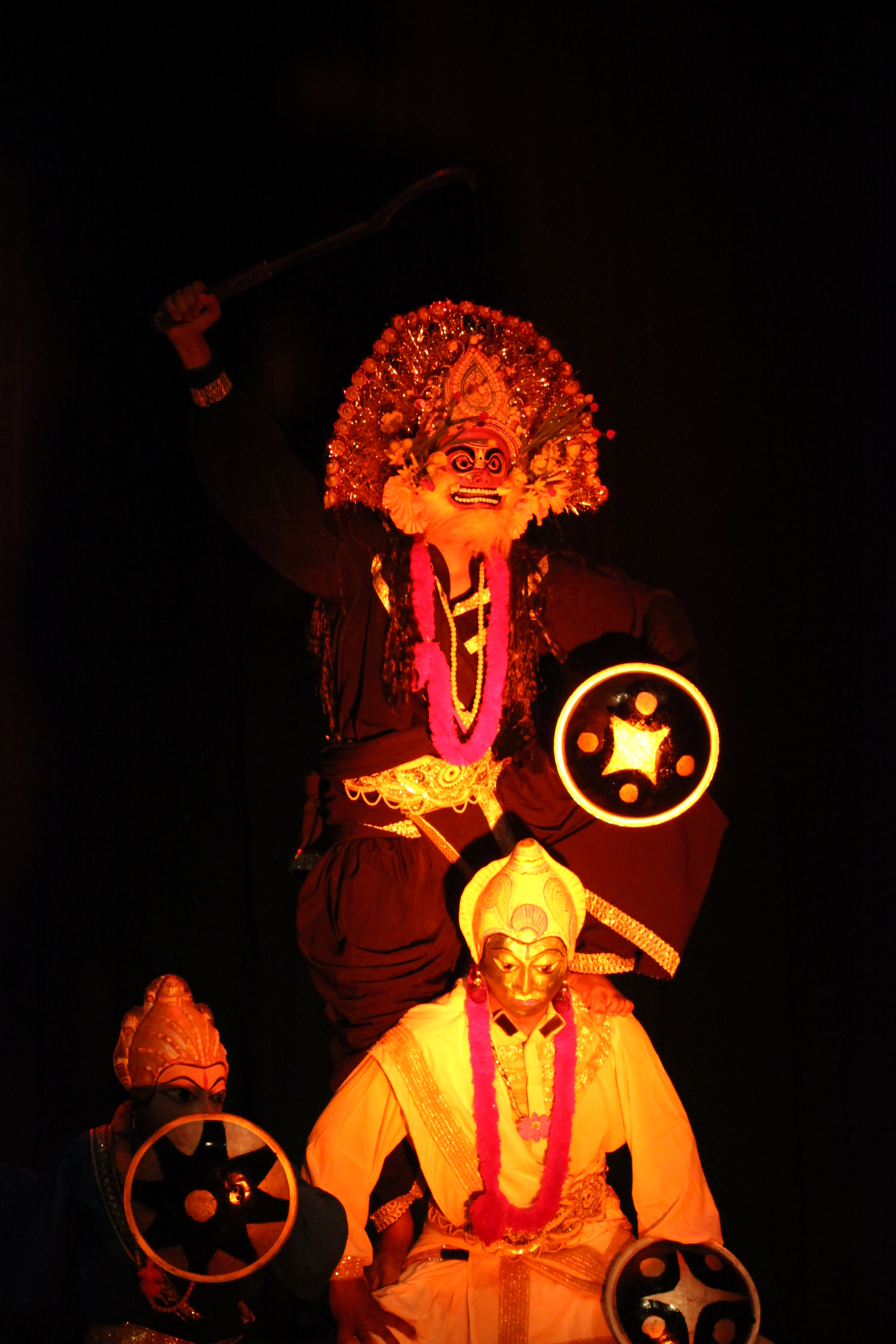
Chhau dance artists

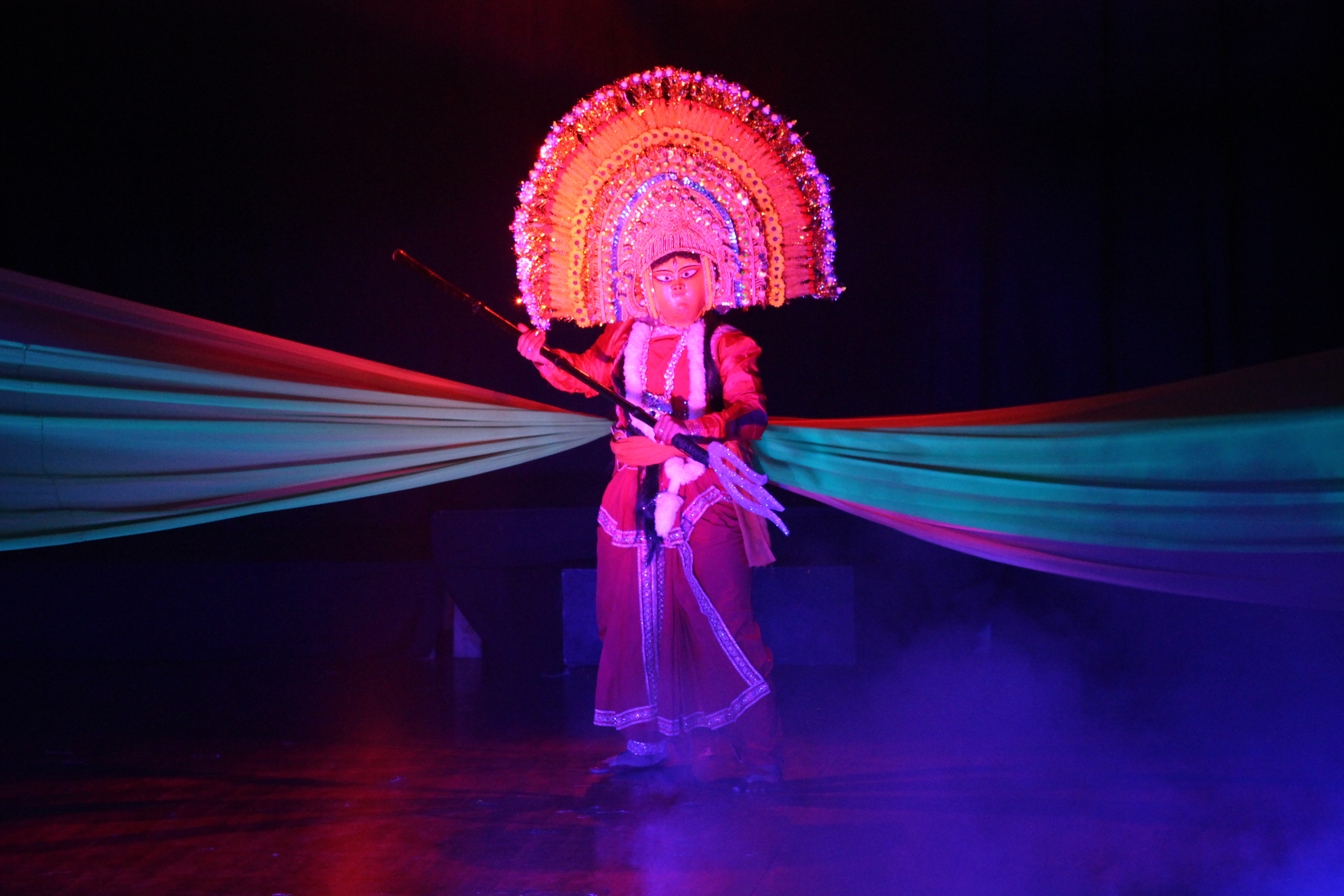
Chhau dance artist

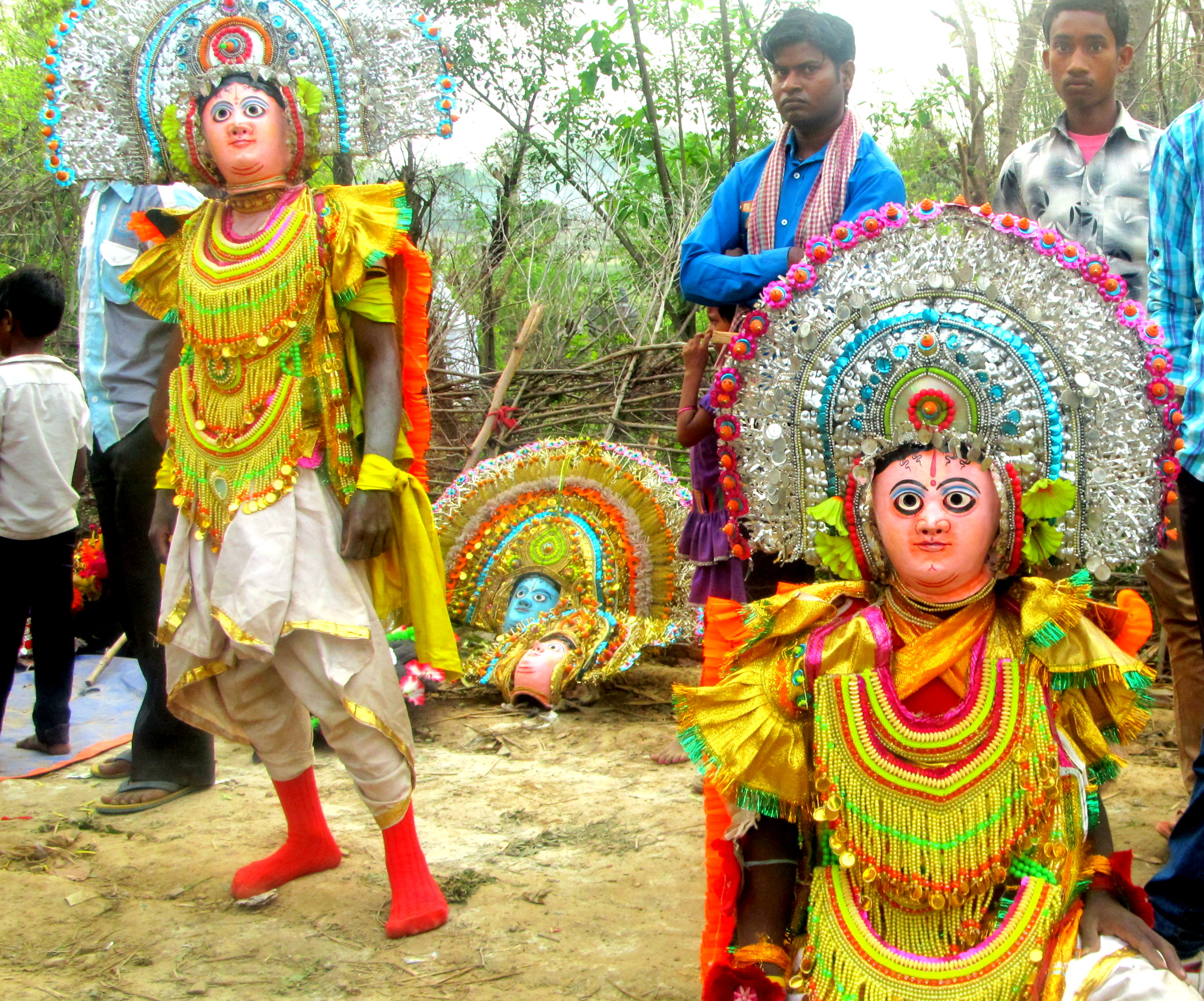
Chhau dancers in a village of Jharkhand

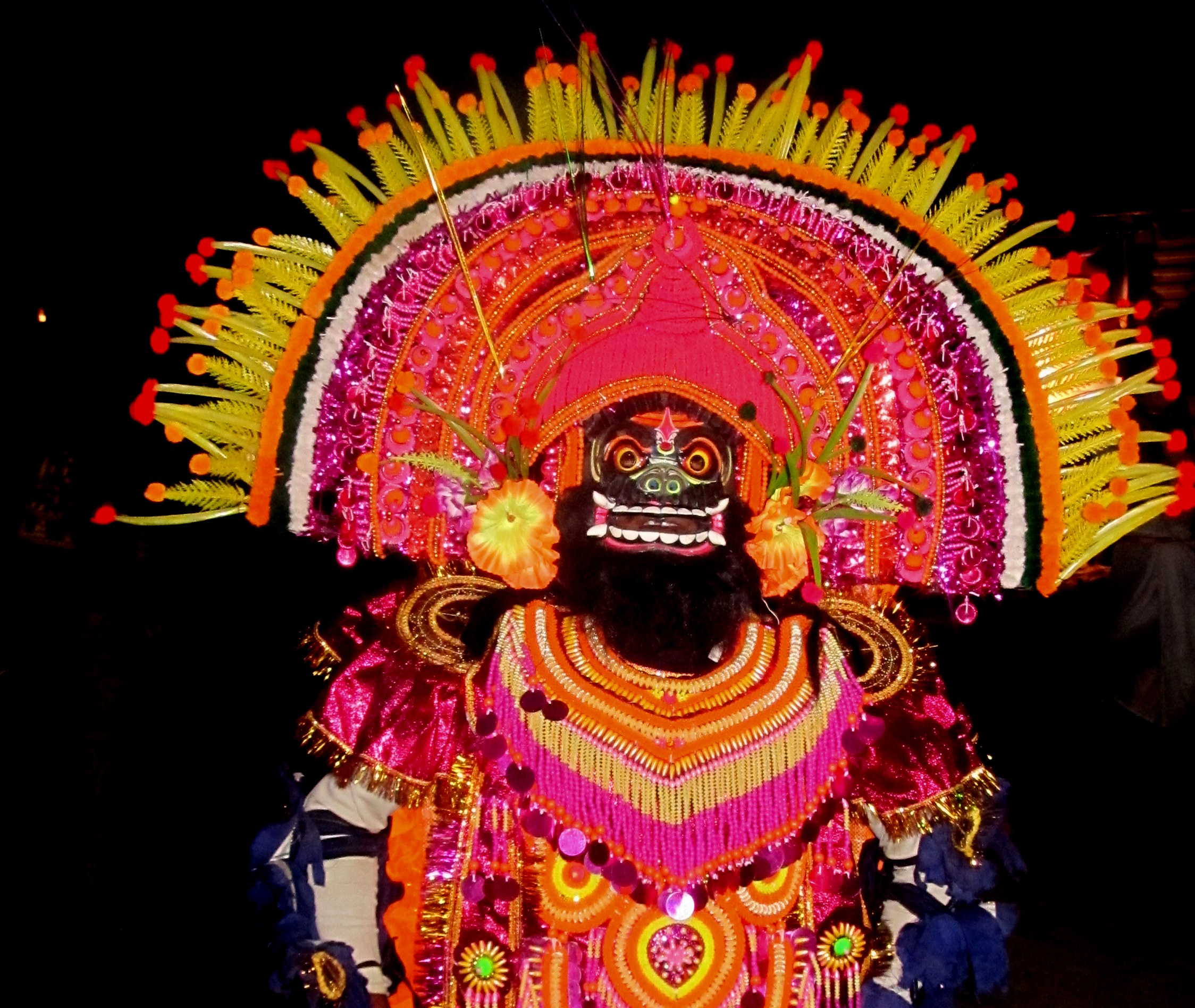
Chhau dancer with demon mask performing at night

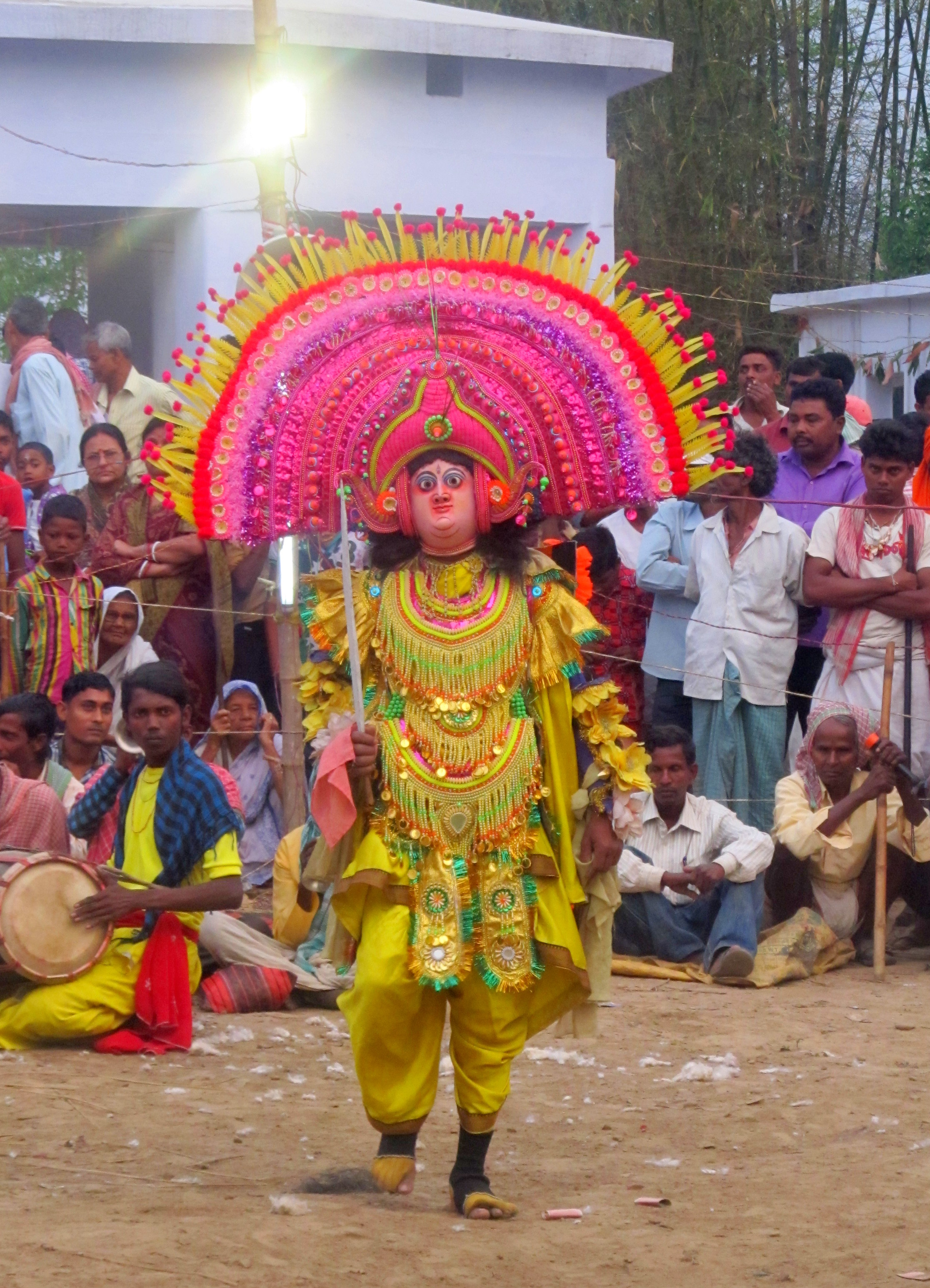
A chhau dancer performing among the villagers in Jharkhand

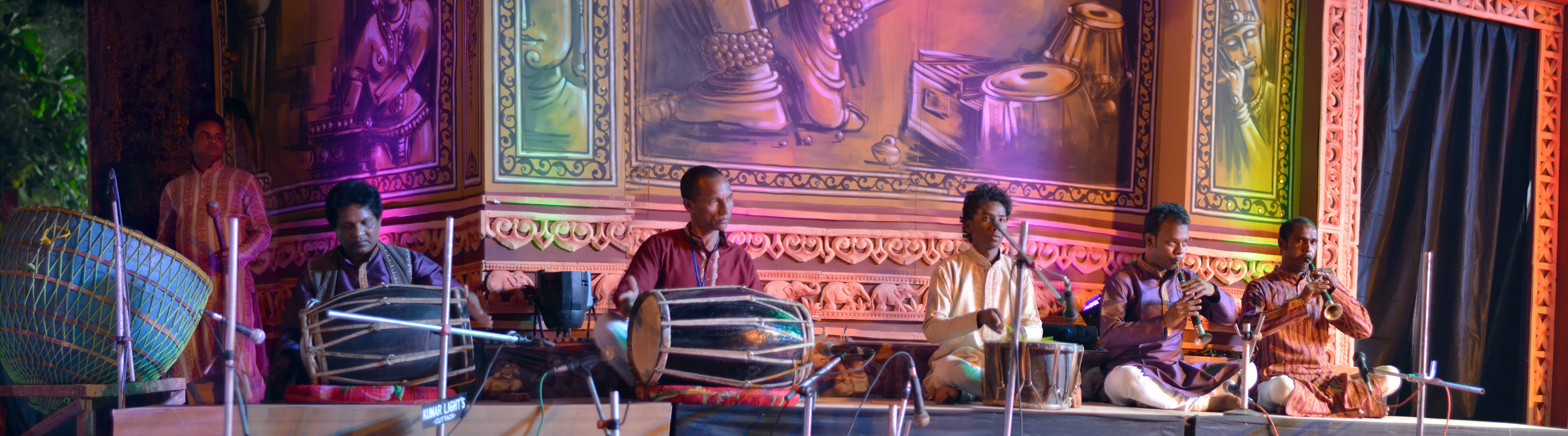
A Mayurbhanj Chhau music troupe performing
