= Ileana Citaristi =

Italian Odissi & Chhau Performer

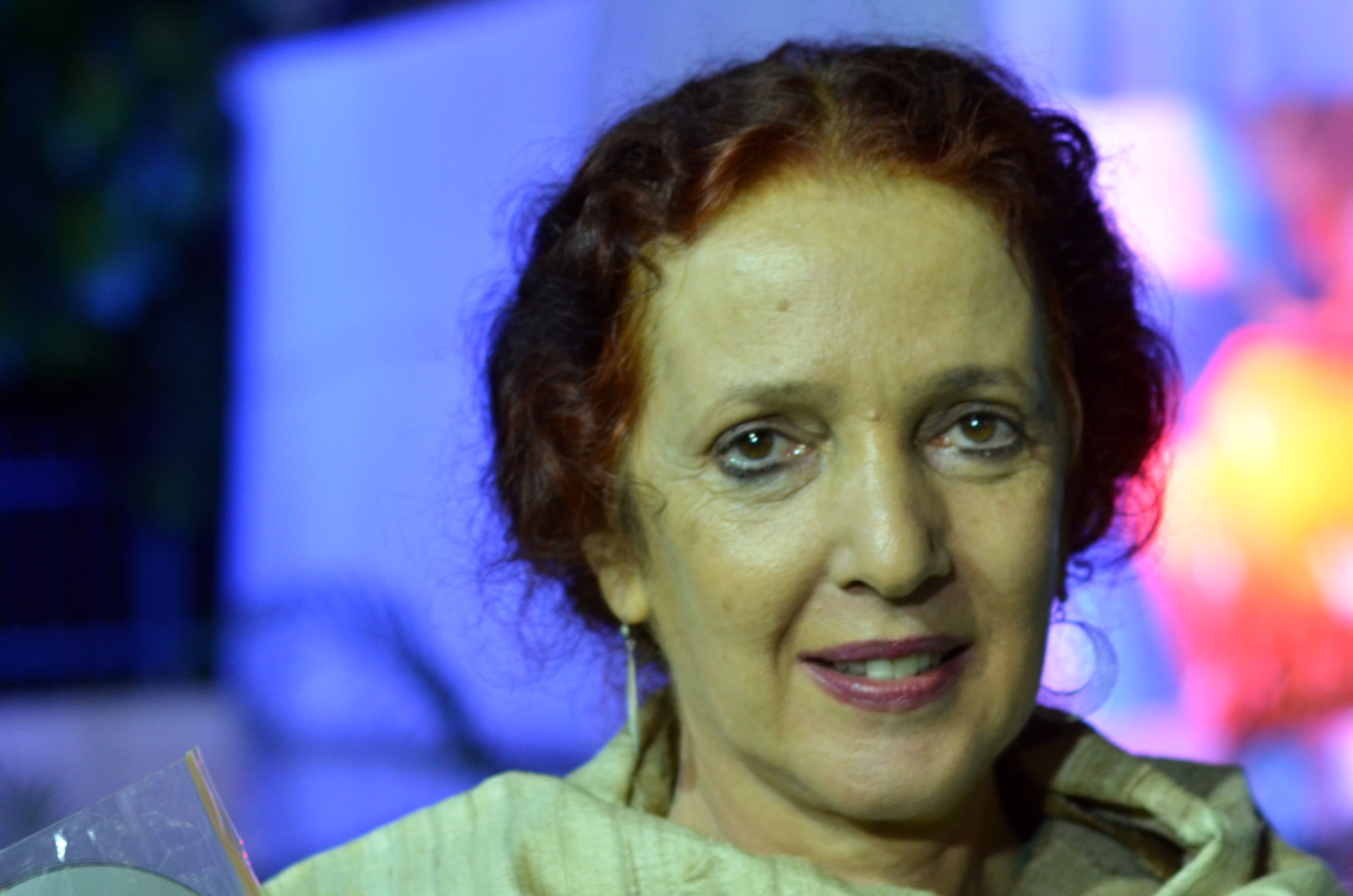

Background information
- Born: Ileana Citaristi; November 16, 1951 (age 74); Bergamo, Italy
- Origin: Odisha, India
- Genre: Odissi
- Occupations: Odissi and Chhau dancer, performer and dance instructor
- Website: ileana.artvisionindia.com

Ileana Citaristi (born 16 November 1951) is an Italian Odissi and Chhau dancer, and dance instructor based in Bhubaneswar, India. She was awarded the 43rd National Film Awards for Best Choreography for Yugant in 1995 and became, in 2006, the first dancer of foreign origin to be conferred the Padma Shri for her contributions to Odissi. She received the Sangeet Natak Akademi award for Odissi dance.

== Early life ==
Citaristi, a native of Bergamo, Italy, the daughter of Severino Citaristi, a leading politician of the Democrazia Cristiana party of Italy. She spent five years as an actress in traditional and experimental theatre in Italy before deciding to learn Kathakali.

She went to Kerala, where she spent three rigorous months studying Kathakali before she went to Odisha on the advice of her Kathakali guru, Krishnan Namboodari.

Since 1979, she has been living in Odisha. She holds a Doctorate of Philosophy with a thesis on 'Psychoanalysis and Eastern Mythology'.

== Dancing career ==
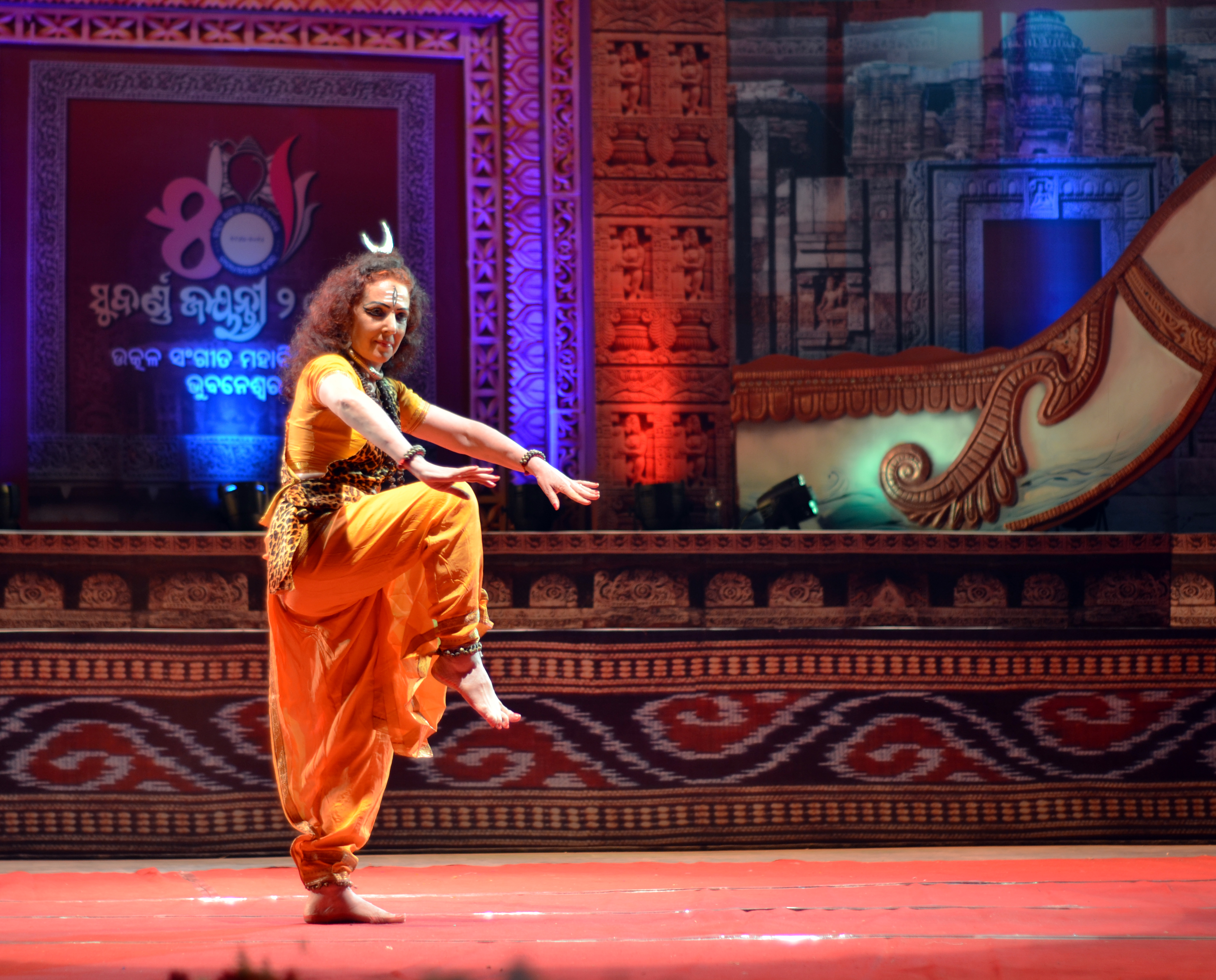
Ileana Citaristi performing Mayurbhanj Chhau at the Utkal Sangeet Mahavidyalaya, Bhubaneswar

Citaristi performing Mayurbhanj Chhau (Shaivism theme) in 2014.

Citaristi studied Odissi under Guru Kelucharan Mohapatra and started her own school of dance in 1994. Citaristi is also an exponent of the Mayurbhanj Chhau, which she learnt under the tutelage of Guru Hari Nayak and holds the title of an acharya of Chhau from the Sangeet Mahavidyalya of Bhubaneswar. She founded the Art Vision Academy in 1996, which acts as a platform for sharing ideas between various artistic forms such as theatre, music, dance and painting. The Academi also conducts classes in Odissi and Chhau.

== Major productions ==
Ileana Citaristi is noted for her innovative choreographic productions in Odissi and Chhau that bring together themes and styles from both the West and the East. In Chhau, some of her notable productions are ‘Echo and Narcissus' based on the Greek myth in Ovid's Metamorphoses, ‘The Journey' that draws on Japanese haiku, ‘Images of Change' based on the Chinese concept of Yin and Yang and ‘Still I Rise' based on Maya Angelou's eponymous poem. In Odissi, 'Maya Darpan', 'Mahanadi: and the river flows', about the history and cultural geography of Orissa, 'Karuna', based on the life of Mother Teresa and Sharanam, a piece on women from three faiths who attain salvation despite their dubious pasts, are some of her notable compositions.

== Books and films ==
Besides Yugantar, a Bengali film directed by Aparna Sen for which she won a National Film Award in 1996, Citaristi has also choreographed for M. F. Husain's Meenaxi: A Tale of Three Cities (2004) and Goutam Ghose's Abar Aranye (2003). Citaristi is also the author of three books. In 2001, she published The Making of a Guru: Kelucharan Mohapatra, his Life and Times in 2012 the Traditional Martial Practices in Orissa and in 2016 My Journey, a Tale of Two Births.

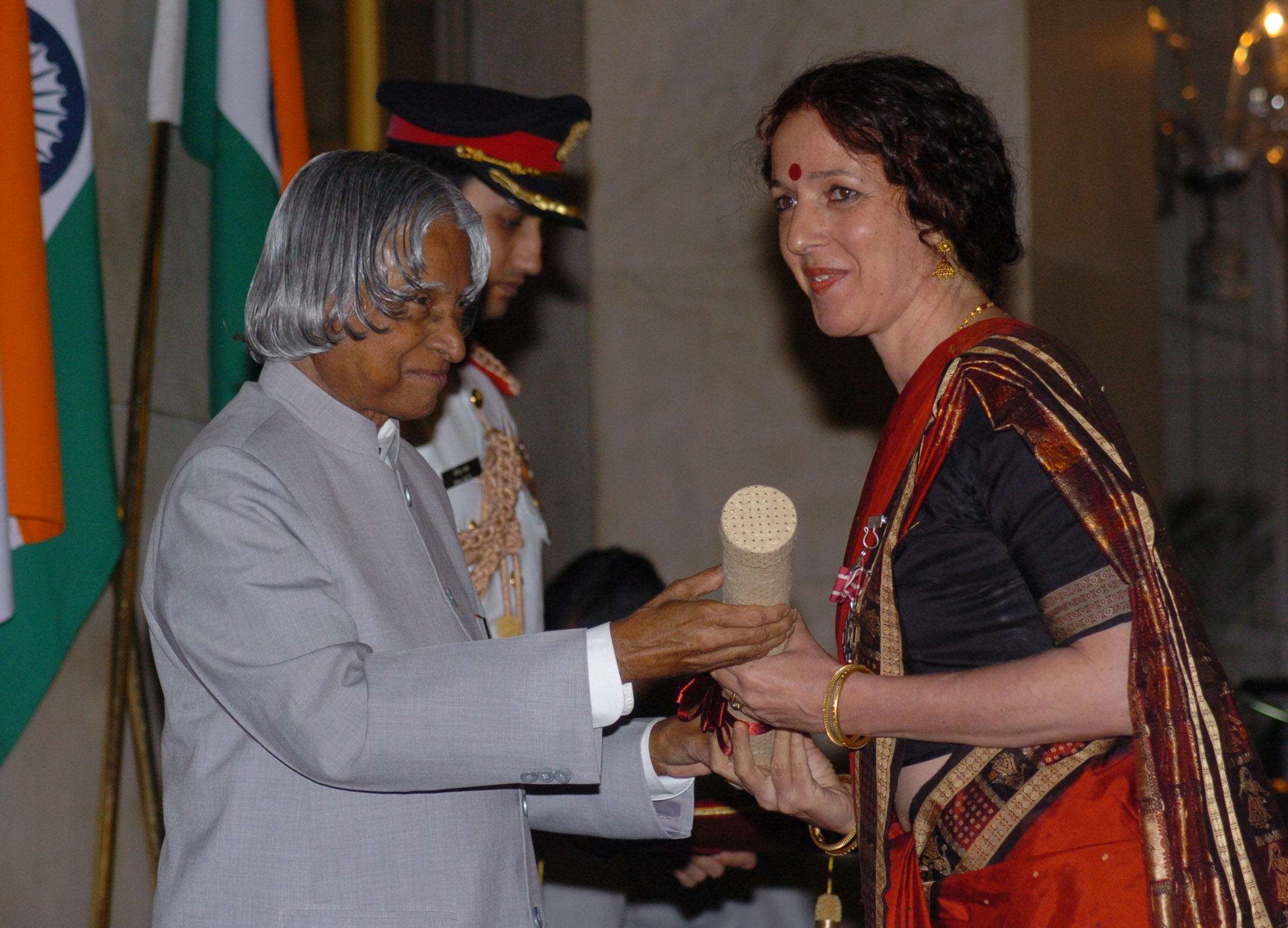
The President, Dr. A.P.J. Abdul Kalam presenting Padma Shri to Dr. Ileana Citaristi, for her contribution to Odissi dance, at investiture ceremony in New Delhi on 29 March 2006

== Awards and honours ==
Citaristi is a ´Top´ grade artist of Doordarshan. She was conferred the title of ´Leonide Massine for the art of dance' in 1992. In 1996, she won the National Film Award for Best Choreography for her work in Aparna Sen's Bengali film Yugant (1995). She is empanelled as ‘outstanding artist’ in ICCR.

She is also a recipient of the ´Raseshwar Award' given by the Sur Singar Sansad, Mumbai. For her contributions to Odissi, she was conferred the Padma Shri by Government of India in 2006. The Italian government made her a member of the Order of the Star of Italian Solidarity in 2008.

== Works ==
- The Making of a Guru: Kelucharan Mohapatra, His Life and Times, Published by Manohar Pub., 2001. ISBN 81-7304-369-8.
- Traditional Martial Practices in Odisha, Subhi Publications, New Delhi, 2012
- My Journey: a Tale of Two Births, Manohar Publication, New Delhi, 2016
- Odissi and the Geeta Govinda, Manohar Publication, New Delhi, 2022
