= Langham (surname) =

Langham is an English toponymic surname.

There are several localities in England with the name Langham from which the surname may have arisen. Langham, Dorset and Langham, Rutland likely got their names the Old English words lang meaning "long" and hamm meaning "water meadow". The Langham baronets got their name from the location in Rutland. Langham, Suffolk and Langham, Norfolk got their names from Old English lang meaning "long" and hām meaning "village" or "homestead". Langham, Essex gets its name from Old English meaning "homestead of the people of" someone named "Lahha" or "Lāwa". Langham, sometimes referred to as Langham Row, in Lincolnshire gets its name from Old English and Old Norse, from a combination of either lang from Old English or langr from Old Norse meaning "long" and holmr from Old Norse meaning "island". It has been described as meaning "long river-island" in Old English. There are more places throughout England named Langham after an elongated homestead or enclosure from which the surname may have arisen, including in Devon. A dweller of any long enclosure may also have been given the name Langham. In addition to the various places still named Langham from which the surname is derived, in some instances it may come from Longham, Norfolk, which was recorded as Langham in 1254.

Notable people with the surname include:

- Antonio Langham (born 1972), former American professional football player
- Bianca Langham-Pritchard (born 1975), Australian field hockey player
- Billy Langham (1876–1927), English-born soccer player
- Sir Charles Langham, 13th Baronet (1870–1951), English entomologist and photographer
- Chris Langham (born 1949), British comedy actor
- Derald Langham (1913–1991), American geneticist researcher
- Elias Langham (1749–1830), American politician, land surveyor and soldier
- Elizabeth Langham (1635–1664), English noblewoman
- Franklin Langham (born 1968), American professional golfer
- Heather Langham (born 1989), Australian field hockey player
- J. N. Langham (1861–1945), American politician from Pennsylvania
- Sir James Langham, 2nd Baronet (c. 1621–1699), English politician
- Sir James Langham, 7th Baronet (1736–1795), English politician
- James R. Langham (1912–1999), American crime writer
- Jessie Margaret Langham (1902–1988), Australian nurse
- Sir John Langham, 1st Baronet (1584–1671), English politician
- Sir John Charles Patrick Langham, 14th Baronet (1894–1972), Irish botanical artist
- Mark Langham (1960–2021), British Catholic priest
- Michael Langham (1919–2011), British actor and director
- Nat Langham (1820–1871), English boxer
- Ryan Langham (born 1981), Australian boxer
- Simon Langham (1310–1376), Archbishop of Canterbury
- Sophie Langham (born 1976), English actress
- Wallace Langham (born 1965), American actor
- Wright Haskell Langham (1911–1972), expert in the fields of plutonium exposure, aerospace and aviation medicine, Mr. Plutonium
