= Lingham (surname) =

Lingham is a surname with English origins. Multiple theories exist about its derivation from Langham, Lingen, or many other similar names. The name may also occur as a variant spelling of Lingam in Indian diasporas.

Notable people with this surname include:

- Ellen Maria Lingham (1854–1887), English performer who used the stage name Nelly Power
- George Lingham (1898–1982), British aviator
- Georgie Lingham (born 1995), English rugby player
- Helena Lingham (born 1963), Swedish curler
- Sam Lingham, writer and director for Aunty Donna
- Susie Lingham (born 1965), Singaporean artist and curator
- Thomas G. Lingham (1870–1950), American actor
- Vinny Lingham (born 1979), South African-American entrepreneur

== See also ==
- Shiva Lingham Stones
