= Langham baronets =

Title in the Baronetage of England

- Creation date: 1660
- Created by: Charles II
- Peerage: Peerage of England
- Status: extant
- Seats: Tempo Manor, County Fermanagh
- Former seat: Cottesbrooke Hall
- Motto: Nec sinit esse feros, Nor suffers them to be savage

The Langham Baronetcy, of Cottesbrooke in the County of Northampton, is a title in the Baronetage of England. It was created on 7 June 1660 for John Langham, Member of Parliament for the City of London in 1654 and for Southwark in 1660 and 1661. The second Baronet was Member of Parliament for Northamptonshire and Northampton while the third Baronet sat for Northampton. The seventh Baronet was Member of Parliament for Northamptonshire. The tenth Baronet represented St Germans in the House of Commons. The thirteenth Baronet was a photographer, ornithologist and entomologist and served as High Sheriff of County Fermanagh in 1930.

The family seat now is Tempo Manor, near Tempo, County Fermanagh. It was previously Cottesbrooke Hall, near Creaton, Northamptonshire, which they sold in the mid-19th century.

== Langham baronets, of Cottesbrooke (1660) ==
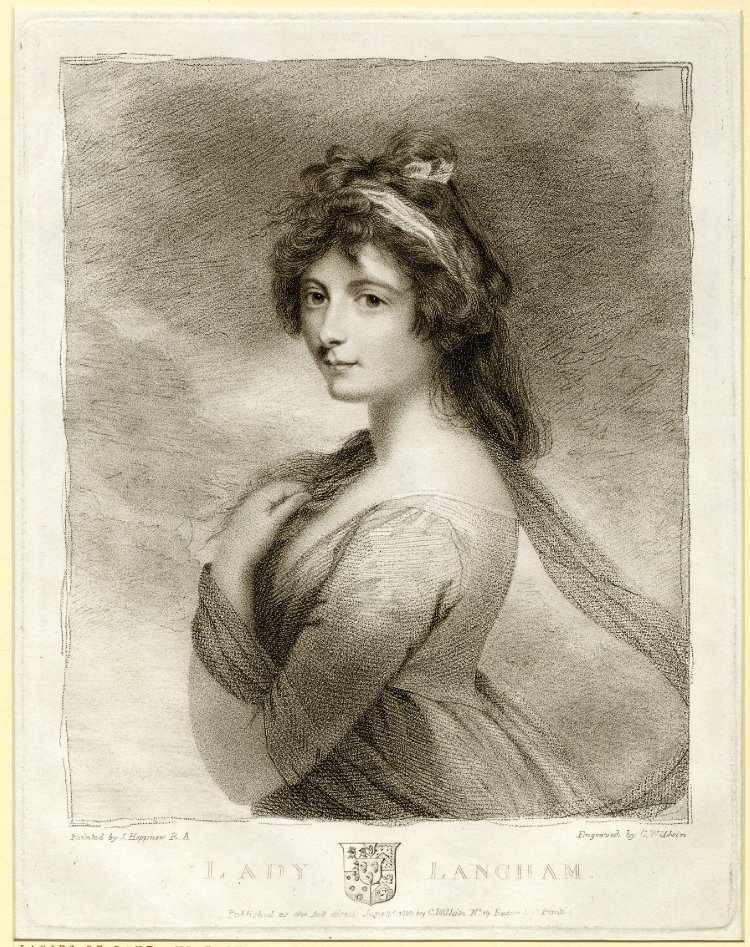
Henrietta Elizabeth Frederica, wife of Sir William Langham, 8th Baronet

- Sir John Langham, 1st Baronet (1584–1671)
- Sir James Langham, 2nd Baronet (1621–1699)
- Sir William Langham, 3rd Baronet (c. 1625–1700)
- Sir John Langham, 4th Baronet (c. 1670–1747)
- Sir James Langham, 5th Baronet (c. 1696–1749)
- Sir John Langham, 6th Baronet (c. 1698–1766)
- Sir James Langham, 7th Baronet (1736–1795)
- Sir William Langham, 8th Baronet (1771–1812)
- Sir William Henry Langham, 9th Baronet (c. 1796–1812)
- Sir James Langham, 10th Baronet (1776–1833)
- Sir James Hay Langham, 11th Baronet (1802–1893)
- Sir Herbert Hay Langham, 12th Baronet (1840–1909)
- Sir (Herbert) Charles Arthur Langham, 13th Baronet (1870–1951)
- Sir John Charles Patrick Langham, 14th Baronet (1894–1972)
- Sir James Michael Langham, 15th Baronet (1932–2002)
- Sir John Stephen Langham, 16th Baronet (born 1960)

The heir apparent is the present holder's son Tyrone Denis James Langham (born 1994).
