= John Langham =

John Langham may refer to:

- Sir John Langham, 1st Baronet, English politician
- Sir John Charles Patrick Langham, 14th Baronet, Irish landowner and botanical artist
