= Highgate House, Creaton =

Building in Creaton, Northamptonshire, England

Coordinates: 52.332°N 0.956°W

Highgate House was an important Northamptonshire coaching inn and Royal Mail posting station at the village of Creaton, on the Northampton to Leicester road, dating from 1663. The building, much expanded and adapted, was used as a country house hotel and conference venue. It was purchased in February 2024 by the Christian Conference Trust and added to its conference centre portfolio. It retains its original appearance and character.

== Location ==
The house is located south of the village of Creaton, Northamptonshire, England, approximately 8 miles (12.9 km) north west of Northampton on the A5199 road and 5 miles (8.0 km) south of the start of the A14 road, which runs from the Catthorpe Interchange with the M1 and M6 motorways, via Cambridge, to Felixstowe.

== History ==
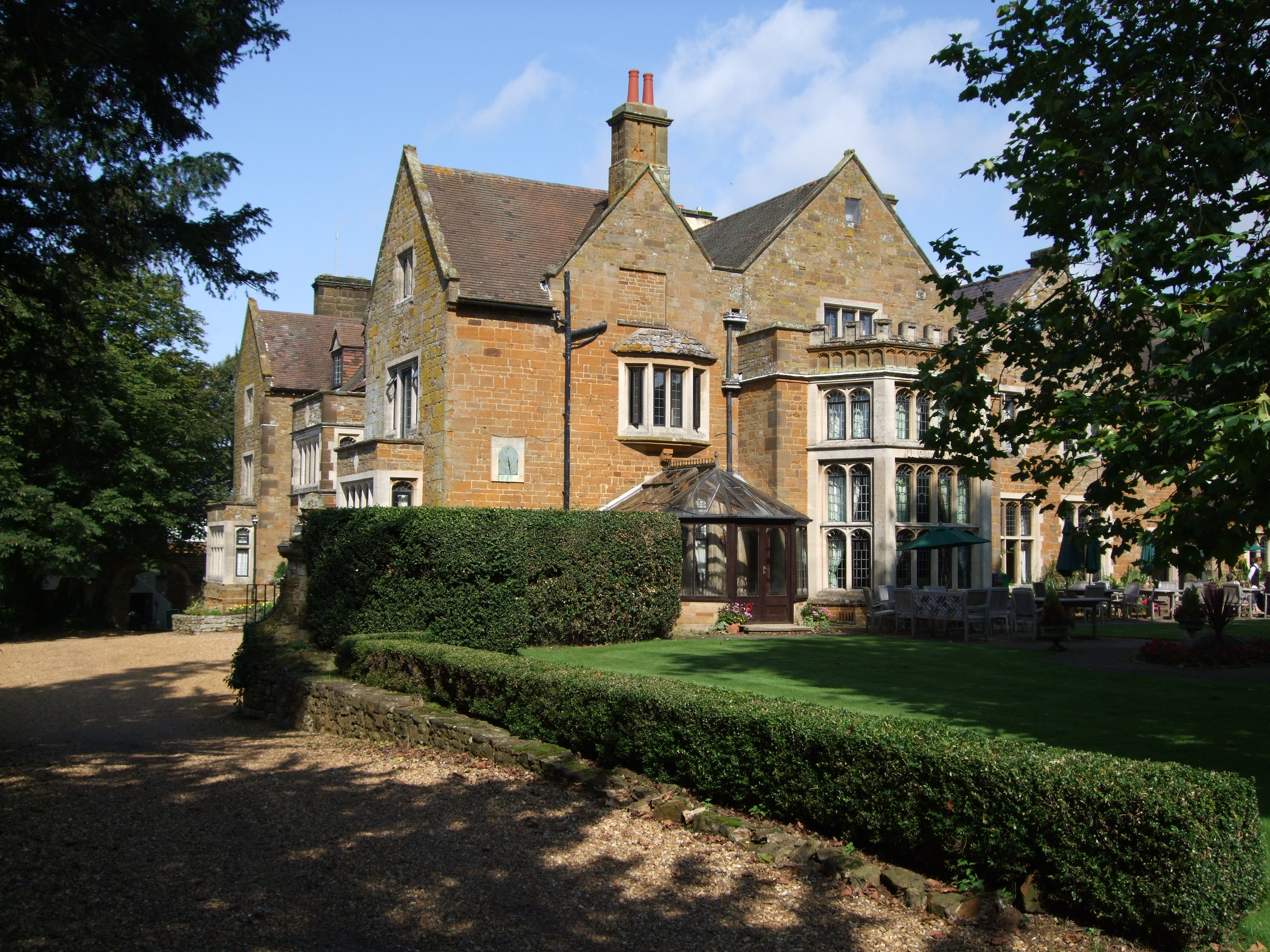
Highgate House from the south on 13 September 2008

The current house is built on the site of an earlier inn with the present buildings dating from 1663. When the main Welford road, now the A5199 became a turnpike in 1721 the inn rose in importance. Successive members of the Bosworth family were licensees until 1837 when the establishment of the railways took over Royal Mail distribution around the country more effectively.

At that time the most famous inhabitant was the Revd Thomas Jones, a fiery Welshman, who came to Creaton in 1785. Unable to find lodgings in the village, he resided at the inn, in defiance of both fellow clergy and also Canon law. However, the landlady supported him, saying that his presence had a good effect on the conduct of the other customers, and his Bishop turned a blind eye for 51 years. In contrast to other more relaxed clergy, Jones filled the church with his preaching and set up the first Sunday School in the county. Distressed by local poverty, he also became Rector of Spratton, a neighbouring village to the south. There he organised a clothing and sick club and employed a woman to teach sewing, all based on his principle of helping the poor to help themselves. With income from the books he wrote, he built six Almshouses in Creaton village.

The house then passed into the Langham family estate at Cottesbrooke Hall in the neighbouring village of Cottesbrooke about one mile north, being later bought by its tenant Lt Colonel Charles Eyre-Coote when the estate was sold in 1911. The house was used as a base for hunting with the Pytchley Hunt based nearby. At this time a large amount of money was spent on the house with the addition of a floor and the Baronial Hall, which is visible in the south elevation behind the 3-storey leaded bay window. The Elizabethan linen-fold wooden panelling in the room was architectural salvage.

The building later became a private house and was eventually sold by the late Mrs Coote, in a somewhat dilapidated state, to the Chudley family in the 1960s. It has since been restored and sympathetically expanded and converted into its current form.
