= Lucy Rigby =

British politician

The Right Honourable Lucy Rigby KC MP
- Official portrait, 2026

Economic Secretary to the Treasury City Minister
- Incumbent
- Assumed office 21 July 2026
- Prime Minister: Andy Burnham
- Preceded by: Rachel Blake
- In office 6 September 2025 – 14 May 2026
- Prime Minister: Keir Starmer
- Preceded by: Emma Reynolds
- Succeeded by: Rachel Blake

Chief Secretary to the Treasury
- In office 14 May 2026 – 20 July 2026
- Prime Minister: Keir Starmer
- Preceded by: James Murray
- Succeeded by: Emma Reynolds

Solicitor General for England and Wales
- In office 2 December 2024 – 6 September 2025
- Prime Minister: Keir Starmer
- Preceded by: Sarah Sackman
- Succeeded by: Ellie Reeves

Member of Parliament for Northampton North
- Incumbent
- Assumed office 4 July 2024
- Preceded by: Michael Ellis
- Majority: 9,014 (21.5%)

Member of Islington London Borough Council for Holloway
- In office May 2010 – March 2012

Personal details
- Born: Lucy Clementine Moores Rigby; November 1982 (age 43) Wegberg, West Germany
- Party: Labour
- Spouse: Will Tanner
- Children: 2
- Education: Durham University (BA); Nottingham Trent University (GDL); Oxford Institute of Legal Practice (LPC)
- Website: https://www.lucyrigby.co.uk

Lucy Clementine Moores Rigby is a British politician and solicitor who has served as Economic Secretary to the Treasury since July 2026, having previously held the same role from September 2025 to May 2026. A member of the Labour Party, she has been the Member of Parliament (MP) for Northampton North since 2024. Rigby was previously Chief Secretary to the Treasury from May to July 2026 and Solicitor General for England and Wales from 2024 to 2025.

== Early life and education ==
Rigby's father served in the Royal Engineers and she was born in RAF Hospital Wegberg in Germany. Her mother worked for the NHS. She was privately educated at Kimbolton School in Cambridgeshire.

Rigby studied politics at Durham University, graduating with a Bachelor of Arts (BA) degree. She then undertook a Graduate Diploma in Law (a law conversion course) at Nottingham Law School and the Legal Practice Course at the Oxford Institute of Legal Practice.

== Legal career ==
Rigby spent time with the International Criminal Tribunal for the former Yugoslavia in the Hague. She joined Magic Circle law firm Slaughter and May as a trainee in 2007, and was admitted as a solicitor in May 2009. She spent secondments in Brussels and Sydney. She remained at Slaughter and May as an associate from 2009 to 2011, specialising in competition law. She then joined the litigation unit of the Office of Fair Trading, working from 2011 to 2012.

After spending time dedicated to trying to win a parliamentary seat at the 2015 general election, Rigby then worked at the consumer body Which?, from 2015 to 2017. She specialised in competition and consumer law matters.

In March 2017, Rigby joined the competition specialist law firm Hausfeld & Co LLP. She specialised in competition law. She became a partner in 2021.

Rigby was listed as a 'Global Leader in Competition Plaintiff' in Who's Who Legal 2023 and in Lawdragon's 500 Global Plaintiff Lawyers 2024.

Rigby was a board member of The Collective Redress Lawyers Association from November 2021 to April 2024.

== Political career ==
=== Islington Borough Councillor ===
In 2010, Rigby was elected a councillor for the Holloway ward of Islington London Borough Council. She stepped down in March 2012, triggering a by-election.

=== House of Commons ===
In 2012, Rigby was selected as Labour's prospective parliamentary candidate for Lincoln. In the 2015 general election, she came in second with 18,533 votes (39.6%).

Rigby was elected as MP for Northampton North in the 2024 general election.

On 29 October 2024, Rigby was elected a member of the Treasury Select Committee. She was also subsequently elected as a delegate to the NATO Parliamentary Assembly. Following the Assembly's Annual Session in Montreal in November 2024, Rigby was elected as the vice-chair of the Transition and Development Sub-Committee of the Economic and Security Committee. Rigby also became the co-chair of the backbench Labour Growth Group.

In November 2024, Rigby was appointed as a Parliamentary private secretary to the Ministry of Justice. She was appointed Solicitor General in December 2024, in a minor reshuffle following the resignation of Louise Haigh.

On 3 February 2025, Rigby was appointed King's Counsel. She was appointed Economic Secretary to the Treasury and City Minister on 6 September 2025. On 12 May 2026 she was appointed as Chief Secretary to the Treasury, in another minor reshuffle following the resignation of Wes Streeting, becoming the first new MP from the 2024 intake to attend Cabinet. She was subsequently appointed a member of the Privy Council on 10 June 2026, entitling her to the style The Right Honourable for life. On 21 July 2026, she returned to the former role in the new government under Prime Minister Andy Burnham and Chancellor of the Exchequer John Healey.

Parliament of the United Kingdom
Preceded by Michael Ellis	Member of Parliament for Northampton North; 2024–present	Incumbent
Legal offices
Preceded by Sarah Sackman	Solicitor General for England and Wales; 2024–2025	Succeeded by Ellie Reeves
Political offices
Preceded by James Murray	Chief Secretary to the Treasury; 2026	Succeeded by Emma Reynolds
