= Tony Marlow =

British politician

Antony Rivers Marlow (born 17 June 1940), known as Tony Marlow, is a British former Conservative politician who served as Member of Parliament (MP) between 1979 and 1997.

== Early life ==
Born in Greenwich, London, Marlow was educated at Wellington College, RMA Sandhurst and St Catharine's College, Cambridge.

== Parliamentary career ==
After leaving the army he was employed in management consultancy and commercial development. Before he entered the House, Marlow unsuccessfully fought Normanton in February 1974 and Rugby in October 1974. He gained Northampton North at the 1979 election, defeating the Labour MP Maureen Colquhoun.

Subsequently, he had a reliably Eurosceptic voting record, voting against the Single European Act and the Maastricht Treaty, as well as against the entry of Spain and Portugal into the EEC. He was one of the eight Conservative MPs who had the party whip withdrawn for opposing a confidence vote, called during the debates on Maastricht Treaty. Together with other rebels, he supported an ultimately successful Labour amendment which set the level of VAT on fuel at half the government's proposed level, a rate that remains to this day. He once angrily called for John Major to resign in front of a packed House of Commons during a statement on the European Union, a scene which caused much uproar in the House.

After losing the whip for his rebellion over the Maastricht Treaty, Marlow endorsed John Redwood's unsuccessful challenge to John Major for the leadership of the Conservative Party in 1995.

He was for many years Chairman of the UK Palestine All Party Group, leading and organising delegations to meet Yasser Arafat and to visit Southern Lebanon, the West Bank and the Gaza Strip.

With Professor Alan Woodruff of the London School of Hygiene and Tropical Medicine, Marlow campaigned against dog nuisance based on the dangers arising from Toxocara canis, initiating the Parliamentary campaign through the introduction of a ten-minute rule bill.

Marlow was Chairman of the Crossrail Private Bill Committee [the last such committee]. Although impressed by the concept, at the time demand for urban travel in London was declining with increasingly sophisticated electronic communications leading to a progressive closure of back offices. It also became apparent that sufficient Treasury funding was unlikely to be forthcoming and that had the Bill been agreed, large parts of east London would have been threatened with planning blight. The Committee voted against the Bill.

He was censured by the then-speaker Betty Boothroyd for referring to Harriet Harman as a "stupid cow" during a debate about mad cow disease on 25 March 1996.

Marlow lost his seat in the 1997 election to Labour's Sally Keeble.

Since leaving Parliament Marlow has been farming in West Wales with a flock of sheep, 70 pure bred Limousin cattle, arable and woodland - over 100 acres of which he has planted. He has also designed and built/converted twenty five houses. He has a large family.

Parliament of the United Kingdom
Preceded by Maureen Colquhoun	Member of Parliament for Northampton North; 1979–1997	Succeeded by Sally Keeble
