= Spratton Hall School =

Location
- Smith Street; Spratton, Northamptonshire, NN6 8HP; England

Information
- Type: Preparatory school
- Established: 1951
- Department for Education URN: 122133 Tables
- Head Master: Simon Clarke
- Gender: Co-educational
- Age: 4 to 13
- Website: https://www.sprattonhall.com/

Spratton Hall School is a private preparatory school that welcomes girls and boys aged 4–13, located in the village of Spratton, 8 miles outside Northampton, England, on the A5199 Welford Road.

== History ==
=== Spratton Hall ===
The main school building was built in the late 1700s on the site of an earlier farmhouse and owned by the Clark family as a private home. It is mainly constructed from limestone from Kingsthorpe.

=== The school ===
Ownership of the building passed through several hands until Kenneth C Hunter and his wife Joan bought it and opened it as a boys’ boarding school in 1951 with 20 boys. They chose the stag for the new school's crest. The stag was originated from a tale of Saint Hubertus' vision, Patron Saint of Hunters.

In 1972 the Charitable Trust was established so the school was administered by a board of governors. The Hunters remained with the school until their retirements in 1975 and Mr Bickley became its first Head Master. In 1987 it became a day-only school and turned co-educational nine years later.

== Campus and facilities ==
The present-day campus consists of various buildings surrounding the historic Spratton Hall, now called "Main House", and subsequent buildings were added as the school expanded. The School has 50 acres (20 ha) of grounds, including a wooded area designated for use as a "forest school".

== Curriculum ==
Pupils are prepared for entry into a private and public schools, which traditionally admitted pupils at age 13. As such, the curriculum of the prep school section prepares pupils to take the Common Entrance Examination at the end of Year 8.

== Notable people ==
- Michael Ellis, politician
- Mark Haddon, author of The Curious Incident of the Dog in the Night-Time
- Harry Mallinder, professional rugby player

=== Former staff ===
- Matt Dawson coached rugby while playing for the Northampton Saints before the sport became professional.
- Tenniel Evans taught at the school during a slack period in his performing career.
