= Northampton North =

UK Parliament constituency (since 1974)

Coordinates: 52.26°N 0.87°W

- Borough constituency for the House of Commons
- Interactive map of boundaries since 2024
- Location within the East Midlands
- County: Northamptonshire
- Electorate: 75,713 (March 2020)
- Major settlements: Northampton (part)

Current constituency
- Created: 1974
- Member of Parliament: Lucy Rigby (Labour)
- Seats: One
- Created from: Northampton

Northampton North is a constituency (Note: A borough constituency (for the purposes of election expenses and type of returning officer)) represented in the House of Commons of the UK Parliament since 2024 by Lucy Rigby, a member of the Labour Party. (Note: As with all constituencies, the constituency elects one Member of Parliament (MP) by the first past the post system of election at least every five years.) The constituency is a considered a bellwether, as it has reflected the national result at every general election since it was created in February 1974.

== Constituency profile ==
Northampton North is a constituency in Northamptonshire in the East Midlands of England. It covers the centre and north of the town of Northampton, including the neighbourhoods of Dallington, Kingsthorpe, Abington and Spinney Hill.

Northampton is one of the UK's largest towns without city status. It is a historic town and was traditionally a major centre for shoemaking. Northampton underwent significant development and expansion during the 1970s after its designation as a new town, the intention of which was to accommodate overspill from Birmingham and London. This constituency has below-average levels of wealth; high rates of deprivation are present in the town centre and in Dallington, whilst the northern, outer suburbs are more affluent. House prices across the constituency are generally similar to the rest of the East Midlands but lower than the UK average.

This constituency has a large young adult population and a low proportion of retirees. Residents have below-average household income, low rates of homeownership, and the child poverty rate is high. They have low levels of education and a high proportion work in the retail and manufacturing sectors. The percentage of residents claiming unemployment benefits is high. White people made up 77% of the population in the 2021 census; around a quarter of the White population are of non-British origin, including large Polish and Romanian communities. Black people and Asians each made up 9% of residents.

At the local council, the town centre neighbourhoods are represented by Labour Party councillors whilst the outer suburbs elected Reform UK representatives. An estimated 59% of voters in Northampton North supported leaving the European Union in the 2016 referendum, higher than the UK-wide figure of 52%.

== History ==
This constituency was created for the election of February 1974 when the old constituency of Northampton was split into Northampton North and Northampton South.

Since creation it has been a bellwether, electing an MP from the winning (or largest governing) party in every general election.

== Boundaries ==
=== Historic ===
1974–1983: The County Borough of Northampton wards of Abington, Dallington, Kingsthorpe, Park, St David, and St George.

1983–2010: The Borough of Northampton wards of Abington, Boughton Green, Dallington and Kings Heath, Headlands, Kingsthorpe, Lings, Lumbertubs, Park, St Alban, St George, Thorplands, and Welford.

2010–2024: The Borough of Northampton wards of Abington, Boughton Green, Eastfield, Headlands, Kingsley, Kingsthorpe, Lumbertubs, Parklands, St David, and Thorplands.

NB: with effect from 1 April 2021, the Borough of Northampton was abolished and absorbed into the new unitary authority of West Northamptonshire.

=== Current ===
Further to the 2023 review of Westminster constituencies, which came into effect for the 2024 general election, the constituency was defined as being composed of the following wards of the District of West Northamptonshire (as they existed on 1 April 2021):

- Abington and Phippsville; Boothville and Parklands; Castle; Dallington Spencer; Headlands; Kingsthorpe North; Kingsthorpe South; St. George; Talavera.

The constituency was expanded considerably with the addition of Northampton town centre from Northampton South.

Further to a local government boundary review which came into effect in May 2025, the constituency now comprises the following wards of West Northamptonshire:

- Abington and Phippsville; Blackthorn and Rectory Farm (small part); Castle (most); Dallington Spencer (most); Headlands; Kingsley and Semilong; Kingsthorpe North; Kingsthorpe South (nearly all); Moulton (small part); Parklands; Talavera.

== Members of Parliament ==
Northampton prior to 1974

Election	Member	Party
Feb 1974	Maureen Colquhoun	Labour
1979	Tony Marlow	Conservative
1997	Sally Keeble	Labour
2010	Michael Ellis	Conservative
2024	Lucy Rigby	Labour

== Elections ==
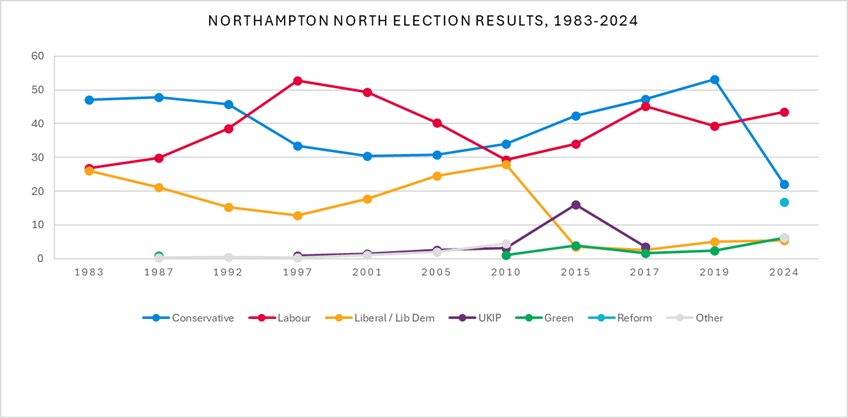
Northampton North election results 1983-2024

=== Elections in the 2020s ===
General election 2024: Northampton North
Party	Candidate	Votes	%	±%
Labour	Lucy Rigby	18,209	43.5	+1.4
Conservative	Dan Bennett	9,195	22.0	−27.8
Reform	Antony Antoniou	7,010	16.8	N/A
Green	Eishar Bassan	2,558	6.1	+3.6
Liberal Democrats	Chris Leggett	2,251	5.4	−0.3
Workers Party	Khalid Razzaq	1,531	3.7	N/A
Independent	Paul Clark	1,059	2.5	N/A
Majority		9,014	21.5	N/A
Turnout		41,813	55.3	−12.2
Registered electors		75,575		
Labour gain from Conservative		Swing	+14.6	

=== Elections in the 2010s ===
2019 notional result
Party	Vote	%
Conservative	25,427	49.8
Labour	21,495	42.1
Liberal Democrats	2,906	5.7
Green	1,415	2.5
Turnout	51,084	67.5
Electorate	75,713	

General election 2019: Northampton North
Party	Candidate	Votes	%	±%
Conservative	Michael Ellis	21,031	53.2	+6.0
Labour	Sally Keeble	15,524	39.3	−5.9
Liberal Democrats	Martin Sawyer	2,031	5.1	+2.6
Green	Katherine Pate	953	2.4	+0.8
Majority		5,507	13.9	+11.9
Turnout		39,539	66.7	−2.0
Conservative hold		Swing	+6.0	

General election 2017: Northampton North
Party	Candidate	Votes	%	±%
Conservative	Michael Ellis	19,065	47.2	+4.8
Labour	Sally Keeble	18,258	45.2	+11.1
UKIP	Jonathan Bullock	1,404	3.5	−12.6
Liberal Democrats	George Smid	1,015	2.5	−1.1
Green	Steve Miller	636	1.6	−2.2
Majority		807	2.0	−6.2
Turnout		40,411	68.7	
Conservative hold		Swing	-3.1	

General election 2015: Northampton North
Party	Candidate	Votes	%	±%
Conservative	Michael Ellis	16,699	42.4	+8.3
Labour	Sally Keeble	13,454	34.1	+4.8
UKIP	Tom Rubython	6,354	16.1	+13.0
Green	Tony Clarke	1,503	3.8	+2.7
Liberal Democrats	Angela Paterson	1,401	3.6	−24.3
Majority		3,245	8.2	+3.4
Turnout		39,711		
Conservative hold		Swing	+1.7	

General election 2010: Northampton North
Party	Candidate	Votes	%	±%
Conservative	Michael Ellis	13,735	34.1	+4.4
Labour	Sally Keeble	11,799	29.3	−10.9
Liberal Democrats	Andrew Simpson	11,250	27.9	+1.0
BNP	Ray Beasley	1,316	3.3	New
UKIP	Jim MacArthur	1,238	3.1	+0.6
Green	Tony Lochmuller	443	1.1	New
Independent	Eamonn Fitzpatrick	334	0.8	New
Christian	Timothy Webb	98	0.2	New
Independent	Malcolm Mildren	58	0.1	New
Majority		1,936	4.8	N/A
Turnout		40,271	62.7	+5.5
Conservative gain from Labour		Swing	+6.9	

=== Elections in the 2000s ===
General election 2005: Northampton North
Party	Candidate	Votes	%	±%
Labour	Sally Keeble	16,905	40.2	−9.2
Conservative	Damian Collins	12,945	30.8	+0.4
Liberal Democrats	Andrew Simpson	10,317	24.5	+6.8
UKIP	John Howsam	1,050	2.5	+1.1
SOS! Northampton	Paul Witherington	495	1.2	New
CPA	Andrew Otchie	336	0.8	New
Majority		3,960	9.4	−9.6
Turnout		42,048	57.9	+1.9
Labour hold		Swing	-4.8	

General election 2001: Northampton North
Party	Candidate	Votes	%	±%
Labour	Sally Keeble	20,507	49.4	−3.3
Conservative	John Whelan	12,614	30.4	−3.0
Liberal Democrats	Richard Church	7,363	17.7	+5.0
UKIP	Dusan Torbica	596	1.4	+0.5
Socialist Alliance	Gordon White	414	1.0	New
Majority		7,893	19.0	0.0
Turnout		41,494	56.0	−14.1
Labour hold		Swing	-3.15	

=== Elections in the 1990s ===
General election 1997: Northampton North
Party	Candidate	Votes	%	±%
Labour	Sally Keeble	27,247	52.7	+14.1
Conservative	Tony Marlow	17,247	33.4	−12.4
Liberal Democrats	L. Dunbar	6,579	12.7	−2.5
UKIP	D. Torbica	474	0.9	New
Natural Law	B. Spivack	161	0.3	−0.1
Majority		10,000	19.0	N/A
Turnout		51,708	70.1	−8.4
Labour gain from Conservative		Swing	+13.3	

General election 1992: Northampton North
Party	Candidate	Votes	%	±%
Conservative	Tony Marlow	24,865	45.8	−2.0
Labour	JM Thomas	20,957	38.6	+8.7
Liberal Democrats	R. Church	8,236	15.2	−5.9
Natural Law	B Spivack	232	0.4	New
Majority		3,908	7.2	−10.7
Turnout		54,290	78.5	+3.9
Conservative hold		Swing	−5.4	

=== Elections in the 1980s ===
General election 1987: Northampton North
Party	Candidate	Votes	%	±%
Conservative	Tony Marlow	24,816	47.8	+0.8
Labour	Owen Granfield	15,560	29.9	+3.0
Liberal	Tony Rounthwaite	10,960	21.1	−5.0
Green	Michael Green	471	0.9	New
Workers Revolutionary	S. Colling	156	0.3	New
Majority		9,256	17.9	−2.2
Turnout		51,963	74.6	
Conservative hold		Swing	-1.1	

General election 1983: Northampton North
Party	Candidate	Votes	%	±%
Conservative	Tony Marlow	23,129	47.0	
Labour	David Offenbach	13,269	26.9	
Liberal	Anthony Rounthwaite	12,829	26.1	
Majority		9,860	20.1	
Turnout		49,227		
Conservative hold		Swing		

=== Elections in the 1970s ===
General election 1979: Northampton North
Party	Candidate	Votes	%	±%
Conservative	Tony Marlow	18,597	48.22	
Labour	Maureen Colquhoun	13,934	36.13	
Liberal	Anthony Rounthwaite	5,659	14.67	
National Front	R G W Rickord	373	0.97	New
Majority		4,663	12.09	N/A
Turnout		38,563		
Conservative gain from Labour		Swing	+8.11	

General election October 1974: Northampton North
Party	Candidate	Votes	%	±%
Labour	Maureen Colquhoun	16,314	43.80	+3.08
Conservative	Richard Tracey	14,776	39.67	+1.53
Liberal	R B Baker	6,160	16.54	−4.60
Majority		1,538	4.13	−4.60
Turnout		37,250		
Labour hold		Swing	+0.78	

General election February 1974: Northampton North
Party	Candidate	Votes	%	±%
Labour	Maureen Colquhoun	16,321	40.72	
Conservative	C M Jackson	15,288	38.14	
Liberal	R B Baker	8,475	21.14	
Majority		1,033	2.58	
Turnout		39,994		
Labour hold		Swing	-3.15	

== See also ==
- Parliamentary constituencies in Northamptonshire

== Sources ==
- Election Demon 1997–2005. English Boroughs Leicester East to Wythenshawe and Sale East
