= Sally Keeble =

British politician

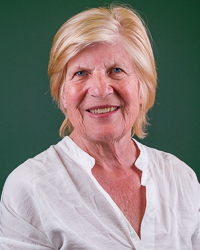
- West Northamptonshire Council portrait, 2025

West Northamptonshire Councillor for Dallington Spencer
- Incumbent
- Assumed office 5 May 2025 Serving with Rufia Ashraf (Lab) and John East (Ref)

Parliamentary Under-Secretary of State for International Development
- In office 29 May 2002 – 13 June 2003
- Prime Minister: Tony Blair
- Preceded by: Hilary Benn
- Succeeded by: Gareth Thomas

Parliamentary Under-Secretary of State for Transport
- In office 7 June 2001 – 29 May 2002
- Prime Minister: Tony Blair
- Preceded by: Office established
- Succeeded by: Tony McNulty

Member of Parliament for Northampton North
- In office 1 May 1997 – 12 April 2010
- Preceded by: Tony Marlow
- Succeeded by: Michael Ellis

Leader of Southwark London Borough Council
- In office 1990 – September 1993
- Preceded by: Annie Matthews
- Succeeded by: Jeremy Fraser

Personal details
- Born: 13 October 1951 (age 75) Berlin, Germany
- Party: Labour
- Spouse: Andrew Hilary Porter
- Relations: Curtis Keeble (father)
- Education: Cheltenham Ladies' College
- Alma mater: St Hugh's College, Oxford

Sally Curtis Keeble (born 13 October 1951) is a British Labour Party politician who is the Leader of the Labour group on West Northamptonshire Council. She was the Member of Parliament (MP) for Northampton North from the 1997 to 2010 general elections, when she lost her seat to the Conservative Party candidate Michael Ellis. She had previously been Leader of Southwark Council from 1990 to 1993. Keeble stood as Labour's candidate for her former constituency in the three elections following her 2010 defeat, losing on all three occasions to Ellis.

== Early life ==
Keeble went to the independent Cheltenham Ladies' College, and later attended St Hugh's College, Oxford, gaining a BA degree in theology in 1973, and a BA in sociology from the University of South Africa in 1981. Her father was the British diplomat Sir Curtis Keeble, a former ambassador to East Germany and the USSR. Before entering Parliament, she was a journalist in South Africa for the Daily News in Durban from 1973 to 1979 and then in Birmingham for the Birmingham Post from 1978 to 1983. She then worked for the Labour Party as a Press Officer at Labour Headquarters from 1983 to 1984, then the Inner London Education Authority where she was assistant director for External Relations from 1984 to 1986, and was Head of Communications for the GMB trade union from 1986 to 1990 before becoming a full-time council leader in Inner London. She was a public affairs consultant from 1995 to 1997.

== Political career ==
Keeble was first elected as a councillor in the 1986 Southwark London Borough Council election for the ward of Consort, being re-elected in 1990.

In 1995, Keeble was selected to stand for the Labour Party in Northampton North through an all-women shortlist.

Keeble served on the Agriculture Select Committee (before its abolition in 2001), and became Parliamentary Private Secretary to Rt. Hon Hilary Armstrong in 1999. Following the 2001 general election she was appointed Parliamentary Under Secretary of State at the Department of Transport, Local Government and the Regions, where her responsibilities included planning, regeneration, housing and local transport. She chaired the taskforce on parks and urban green spaces. In 2002, she moved to the Department for International Development. In 2003, she left the frontbench. From 2005, she was a member of the Treasury Select Committee.

Keeble introduced a private members bill to introduce the offence of causing death by careless driving: the measure was later accepted by the Government and introduced in the Road Safety Act 2006. She also introduced ten-minute rule bills on flooding, and a bill on minimum pricing for alcohol.

Keeble was involved in the 2009 United Kingdom Parliamentary Expenses scandal claiming £4,112 for windows at her Northampton house under the second home allowance, £3,072 for a new boiler and £950 for essential maintenance on the bathroom at her Northampton home.

At the 2010 general election, Keeble lost her Northampton North seat by 1,937 votes to the Conservative Party candidate Michael Ellis, a swing of 6.9% from the previous election.

At the 2019 United Kingdom general election Keeble failed to regain her Northampton North seat. The Conservative candidate Michael Ellis increased his majority to 5,507, a swing of 6% from the previous election, to hold his seat in Northampton North.

Keeble had stood as a Labour candidate at every general election between 1997 and 2019.

=== Local politics ===
Keeble re-entered public office upon her election to West Northamptonshire Council for Castle ward in the 2025 election. She was then elected leader of the Labour group on the Council following the previous leader, Wendy Randall, not being re-elected to the council. Bob Purser was elected as Keeble's deputy.

== Personal life ==
Keeble married Andrew Hilary Porter on 9 June 1990 in Camberwell; the couple have a son and daughter together. She is an honorary fellow of South Bank University.

Her sister, Jane Mahoney, and her brother-in law Anthony; were killed on 12 July 1998 near Darwin in Australia. A Hells Angel motorcyclist had ploughed into them whilst they were waiting by the roadside after Anthony changed a wheel. The Hell's Angel carried on driving and failed to report the accident. After the accident, her father, Sir Curtis Keeble, the former British ambassador to the Soviet Union from 1978 to 1982 and governor of the BBC, had a heart attack.

Parliament of the United Kingdom
Preceded by Tony Marlow	Member of Parliament for Northampton North; 1997–2010	Succeeded by Michael Ellis
