= Highgate House =

Highgate House is the name of:

- Highgate House, Beverley in the East Riding of Yorkshire, England
- Highgate House, Creaton in Northamptonshire, England
