= Creaton =

Village in Northamptonshire, England

Coordinates: 52.34063°N 0.96369°W

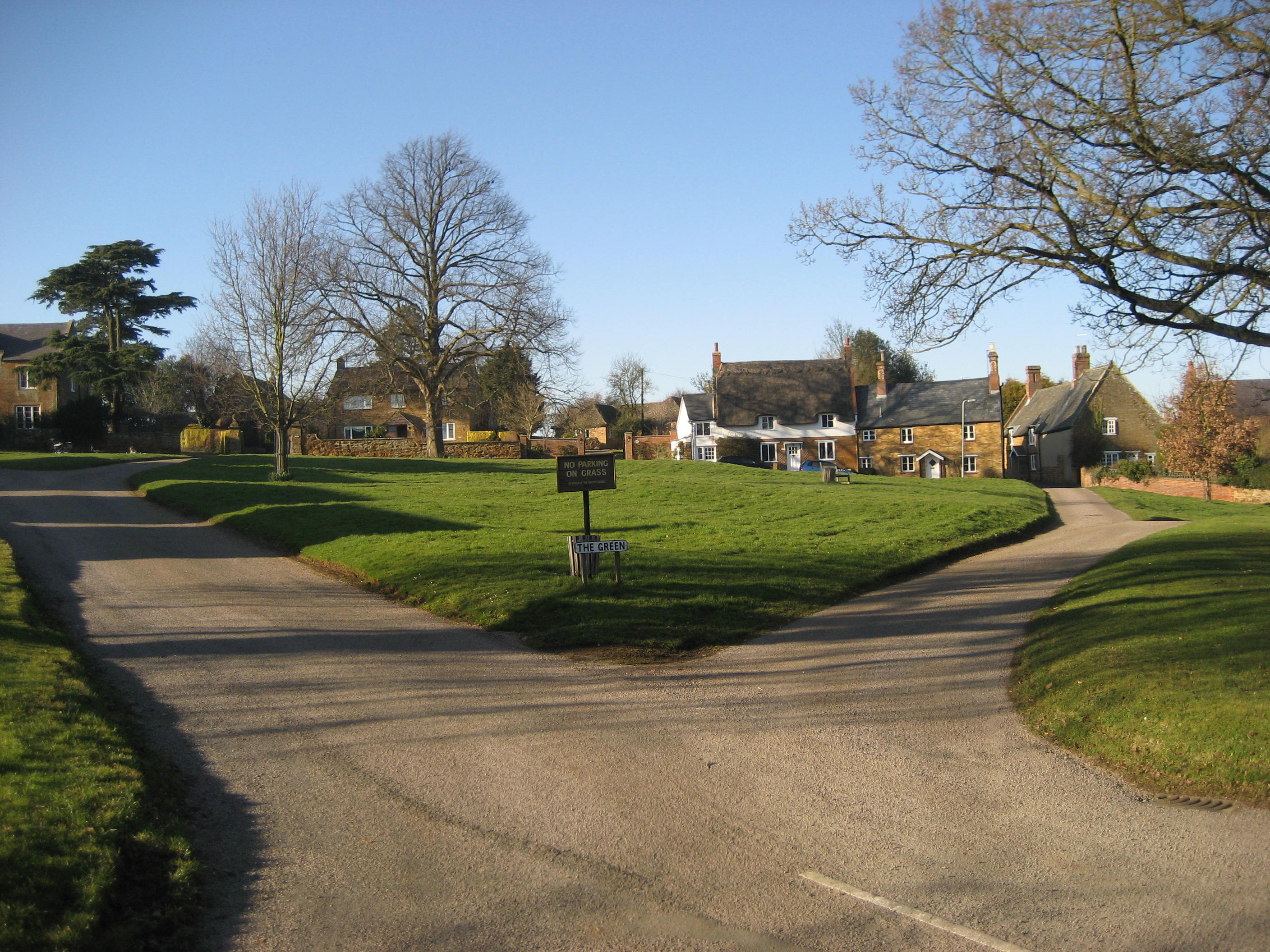
- Creaton Village Green

- Location within Northamptonshire
- Population: 503 (2011 census)
- OS grid reference: SP707719
  - London: 73 miles (117 km)
- Civil parish: Creaton
- Unitary authority: West Northamptonshire
- Ceremonial county: Northamptonshire
- Region: East Midlands
- Country: England
- Sovereign state: United Kingdom
- Post town: NORTHAMPTON
- Postcode district: NN6
- Dialling code: 01604
- Police: Northamptonshire
- Fire: Northamptonshire
- Ambulance: East Midlands
- UK Parliament: Daventry

Creaton is a village and civil parish in the West Northamptonshire district, in the ceremonial county of Northamptonshire, England.

== Location ==
The village is 8 miles (13 km) north-west of the town of Northampton and 18 miles (29 km) south-east of the city of Leicester, along the A5199, formerly designated as the A50 trunk road. The road is known as Welford Road in the village and runs along the top of the ridge on which the village stands giving it extensive views east and west. About 5 miles (8 km) north on the road the A5199 connects with the A14 trunk road, a dual carriageway connecting the M1 and M6 motorways from the Catthorpe Interchange with Kettering, Cambridge, Ipswich and the port of Felixstowe.

== Governance ==
The village has its own Parish Council and is part of Daventry Parliamentary Constituency. The Daventry constituency has been represented by a member of the Conservative Party since 1974.

The village is currently governed by West Northamptonshire council. Before local government changes the local district council was Daventry District Council where Creaton was in Spratton ward together with the villages of Cottesbrooke, Spratton itself and surrounding rural areas. The village was in the Northamptonshire County Council area.

On 25 March 1884 the parish of Little Creaton was abolished and merged with Creaton.

== History ==
The village is mentioned in the Domesday Book as 'Creaton Magna' (now the main part of the village) and 'Creaton Parva' (now Little Creaton). In the centre of the village, across Grooms Lane, are the foundations of the house where Amphylis Twigden, great-great-grandmother of George Washington, first President of the United States was born and lived. Twigden married the Revd Lawrence Washington, son of Lawrence Washington (1602–1652). Their son, John Washington, emigrated to America and was the father of George.

On 22 July 1944 at 22:53hrs, 92 Group RAF informed Flying Control at RAF Husbands Bosworth that a V1 Flying Bomb was heading in their direction. However, at 22.57hrs a message was received that the bomb had crashed on Creaton. Severe damage was done to houses in the village but nobody was killed.

== Demographics ==
The 2001 census showed that there were 488 people living in the village, 243 male, 245 female, with average age 39.18 years. The 2011 census showed an increase in population to 503. There were 196 dwellings of which 7 unoccupied, 182 of them with central heating and 155 being owner occupied.

== Buildings ==
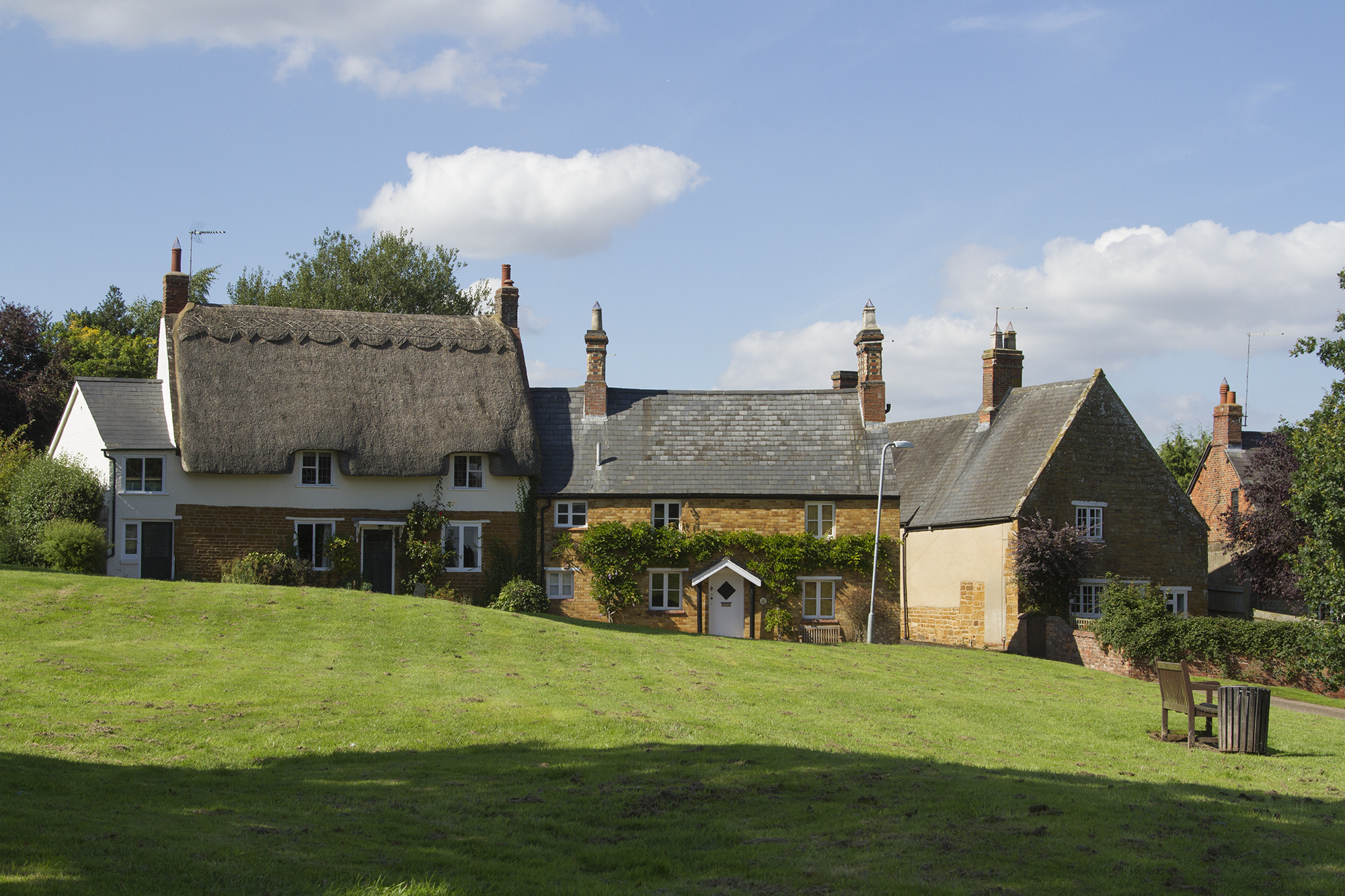
Houses in the main village by the green

Creaton has a typical English village green which is a large focal point with a number of interesting buildings including the Manor House, built in 1604. Also overlooking the green are a terrace of almshouses which were founded in 1825 and rebuilt in 1897. There a brick-built United Reformed chapel, originally erected as a non-conformist chapel in 1604, though the current building dates from 1793. A number of houses are thatched and built of the local sandstone. One of the cottages, Moringside, has a doorway from Holdenby Palace. Traditional hunt meets were frequently held on the green; hunting in the area is now run within the bounds of the current legislation. Creaton also has a village park which has a full sized football pitch.

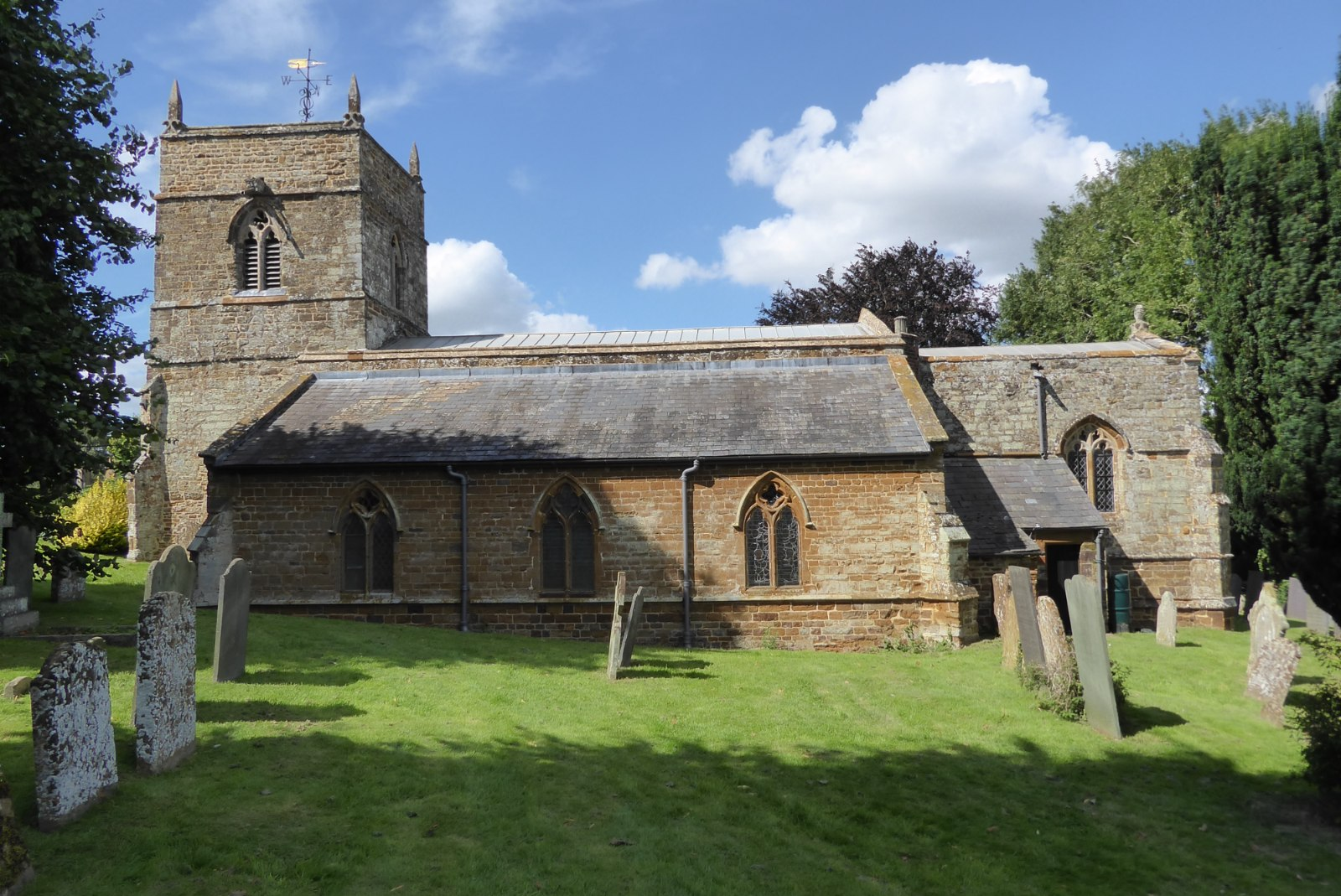
St. Michael and All Angels

The village has a medieval church, dedicated to St. Michael and All Angels (Church of England) with a low stone tower. The church dates from the 12th century.

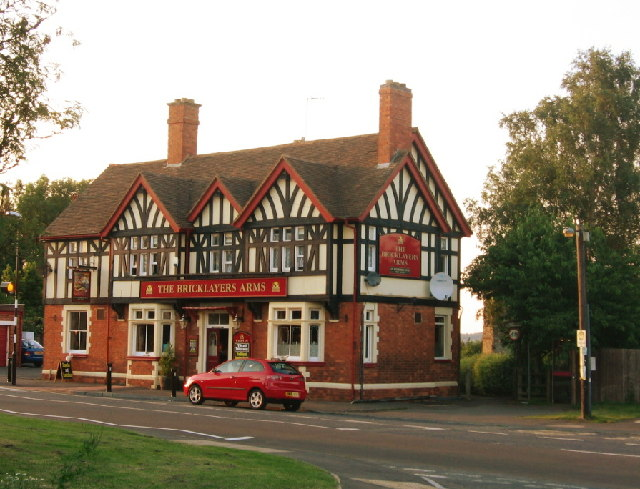
The Bricklayers Arms pub, 2005. Now a restaurant c. 2022

The village public house is the Bricklayers Arms, on Welford Road. On the southern edge of the village is Highgate House, a conference centre and former 17th century coaching inn. The village won village of the year 2008 and the now-closed local shop won an award.

The village has a new village shop which was erected on the Welford Road and opened in August 2018 after a successful community fundraiser.

Although in fact within the boundaries of the parochial parish of Hollowell, Creaton Hospital (formally the Northampton County Sanatorium) stood at the bottom of the hill on the other side of the Welford Road. This was a tuberculosis hospital in operation between 1910 and 1979, converted to 13 private houses in the early 1980s and now called Highfield Park.

Nearby historic buildings include Cottesbrooke Hall and estate ca. 1 mile (2 km) north; Holdenby House and Althorp ca. 2 miles (3 km) and 3 miles (5 km) south respectively; Coton Manor Garden and Ravensthorpe Reservoir both ca. 1 mile (2 km) west; the 7th Century Saxon church at Brixworth ca. 2 miles (3 km) east.

== Other facilities ==
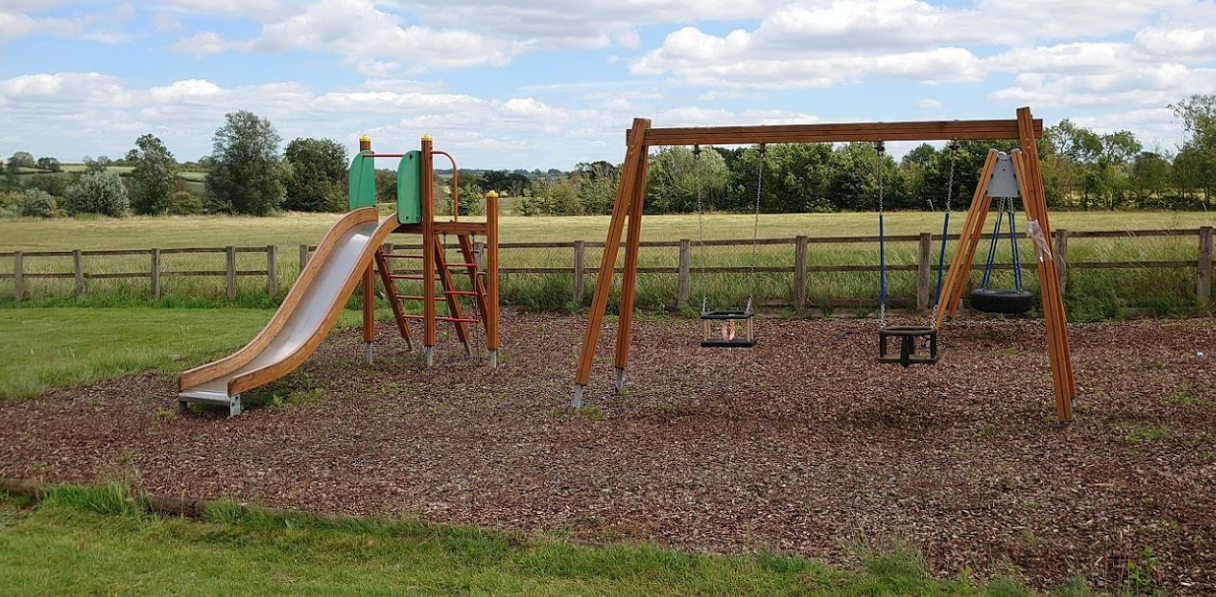
The children's park

- Ducklings Pre-School operates out of the site of the old primary school which was closed in December 2018.
- There are two small industrial and business estates: one is off Grooms Lane, near Highgate House; the other is along the Brixworth Road on the outskirts of Creaton, known as Twigden Barns.
- It also boasts a playing field with many walks around it and a small children's park Creatons Children's Park

== See also ==
- Highgate House
