= Cottesbrooke Hall =

Country house and estate in Northamptonshire, England

Coordinates: 52.359°N 0.957°W

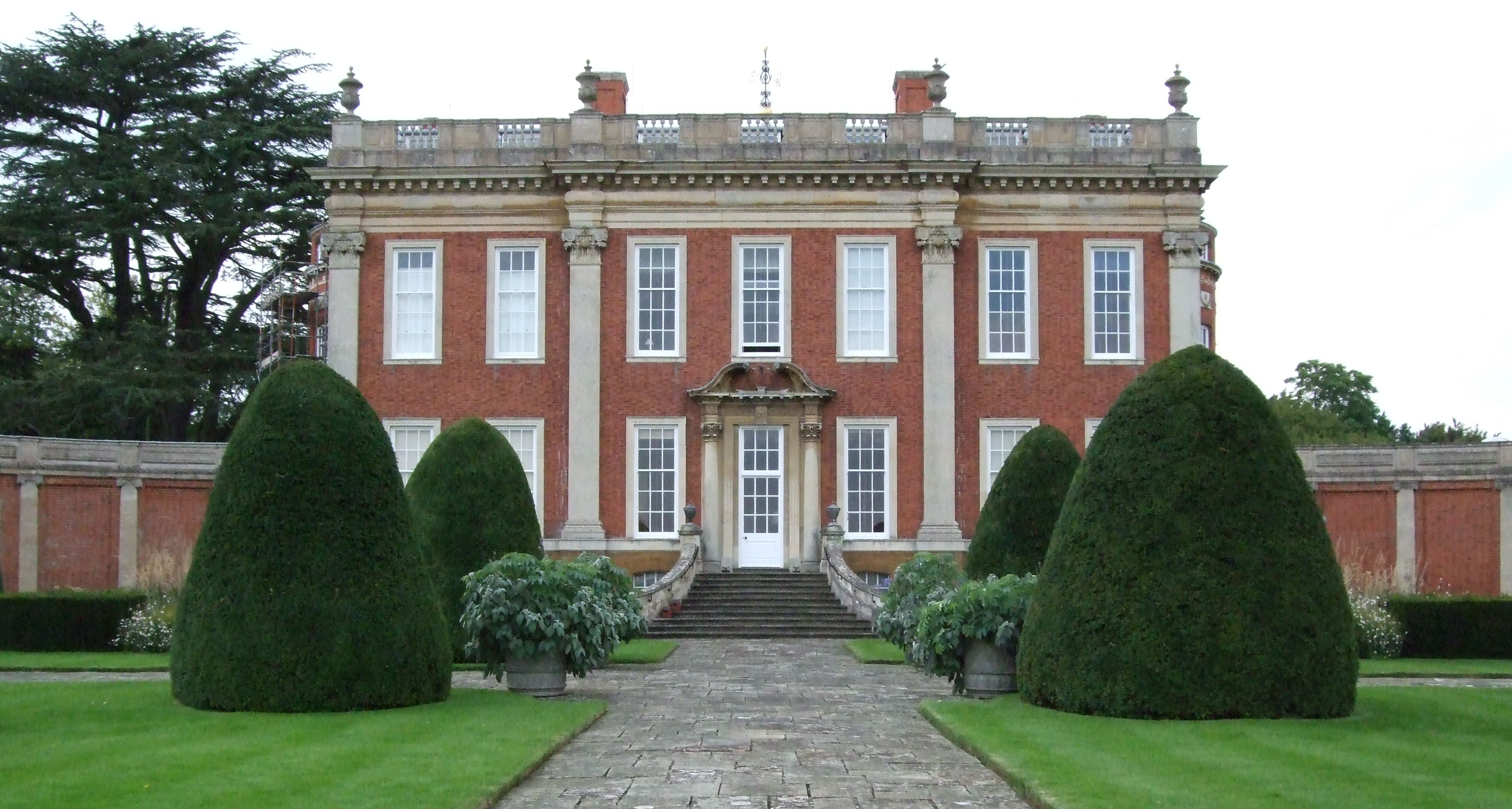
Cottesbrooke Hall central block, Cottesbrooke, Northants

Cottesbrooke Hall and the Cottesbrooke estate in Northamptonshire, England, is a Grade I listed country house and estate.

== Location ==
The Hall and estate are approx. 10 miles (16 km) north of the town of Northampton along the A5199 road just 1 mile (1.6 km) north of the village of Creaton. The village of Cottesbrooke is adjacent to the estate.

== Hall and estate ==
The Hall is a near-perfect example of Queen Anne architecture located in a large parkland setting with wide views across the local countryside. It is constructed in brick with ashlar dressings and lead and slate roofs with a 7-window frontage. The building was begun in 1702 and finished in 1713 by Sir John Langham and remains today largely unaltered, although some extensions were later carried out by Robert Mitchell c1770-95. It is home to the Woolavington Collection, one of the most extensive collections of sporting paintings in the world.

The Hall is set in the 18th-century landscaped Cottesbrooke Park, and has fine furniture, the interior decoration, grounds and gardens. It was winner of the Historic Houses Association/Christie's 'Garden of the Year' Award in 2000.

The building and grounds are open from May to September. The times are limited and visitors should book in advance if requiring tours of the house. The best route to the visitor entrance is via a signposted turn, east off the A5199 at Creaton.

== History ==
The Cottesbrooke estate was purchased in 1635 by Sir John Langham, 1st Baronet, a rich London Turkey merchant and MP. It descended in the Langham family to the 4th Baronet, who in 1702 began the building of the present hall. Sir James Langham, 7th Baronet was High Sheriff of Northamptonshire for 1767 and MP for Northamptonshire from 1784 to 1790. Sir James, the 11th baronet, had mental disabilities and the estate was managed by Sir Herbert Langham, his brother and eventual successor. In 1877 the Hall was let for several months to the Empress Elisabeth of Austria as a base for a hunting holiday. In 1911 financial pressures forced the family to sell the estate to Captain Robert Bingham Brassey, MP and move to County Fermanagh. Since 1937 Cottesbrooke has been the home of the MacDonald-Buchanan family. In 1937-8 they employed Lord Gerald Wellesley (later the 7th Duke of Wellington) to make alterations to the Hall, including changing the entrance front to the other side of the house.

Cottesbrooke Hall is thought to have been the inspiration for Mansfield Park, the country estate of Sir Thomas Bertram in Jane Austen's 1814 novel Mansfield Park.

== Gardens ==
The gardens today are entirely 20th century. The architect Robert Weir Schultz, 1860–1951, designed a sunken courtyard garden with a pool and pergola, and a long paved terrace walk between mixed borders and overshadowed by old Lebanon cedars. A pair of 18th century gates lead to pleached limes and a statue of a gladiator. A statue walk with yew hedges has four fine statues by Peter Scheemakers originally in the Temple of Ancient Virtue at Stowe and bought in 1938. South of the house, which was originally the entrance façade, a new garden surrounded by wrought-iron railings was laid out in 1937 by Sir Geoffrey Jellicoe in the form of a quadripartite parterre, with topiary shapes of common and golden yew disposed among lead statues, beds of ‘Iceberg’ roses, and tubs of agapanthus.

== See also ==
- Highgate House, Creaton
