= Michael Ellis (British politician) =

British Conservative politician and barrister (born 1967)

The Right Honourable Sir Michael Ellis KBE KC
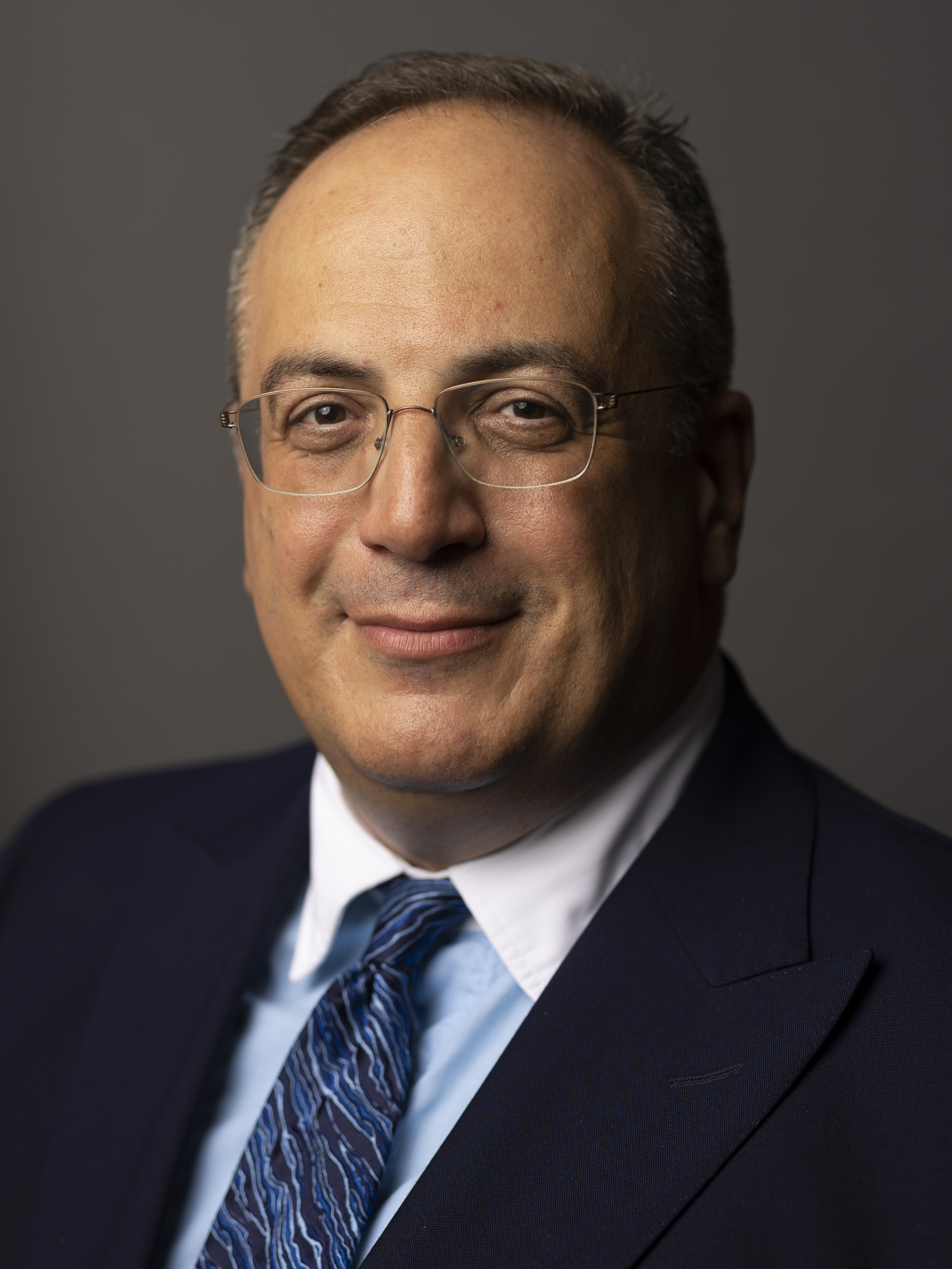
- Official portrait, 2022

Attorney General for England and Wales Advocate General for Northern Ireland
- In office 6 September 2022 – 25 October 2022
- Prime Minister: Liz Truss
- Preceded by: Suella Braverman
- Succeeded by: Victoria Prentis
- In office 2 March 2021 – 10 September 2021 (Note: In accordance with the Ministerial and other Maternity Allowances Act 2021, Ellis temporarily served as Attorney General during Braverman's maternity leave.)
- Prime Minister: Boris Johnson
- Preceded by: Suella Braverman
- Succeeded by: Suella Braverman

Minister for the Cabinet Office
- In office 8 February 2022 – 6 September 2022
- Prime Minister: Boris Johnson
- Preceded by: Steve Barclay
- Succeeded by: Edward Argar

Paymaster General
- In office 16 September 2021 – 6 September 2022
- Prime Minister: Boris Johnson
- Preceded by: Penny Mordaunt
- Succeeded by: Edward Argar

Solicitor General for England and Wales
- In office 10 September 2021 – 16 September 2021
- Prime Minister: Boris Johnson
- Preceded by: Lucy Frazer
- Succeeded by: Alex Chalk
- In office 26 July 2019 – 2 March 2021
- Prime Minister: Boris Johnson
- Preceded by: Lucy Frazer
- Succeeded by: Lucy Frazer

Minister of State for Transport
- In office 23 May 2019 – 24 July 2019
- Prime Minister: Theresa May
- Preceded by: Jesse Norman
- Succeeded by: Chris Heaton-Harris

Parliamentary Under-Secretary of State for Arts, Heritage and Tourism
- In office 9 January 2018 – 23 May 2019
- Prime Minister: Theresa May
- Preceded by: John Glen
- Succeeded by: Rebecca Pow

Deputy Leader of the House of Commons
- In office 17 July 2016 – 9 January 2018
- Prime Minister: Theresa May
- Preceded by: Thérèse Coffey
- Succeeded by: Chris Heaton-Harris

Member of Parliament for Northampton North
- In office 6 May 2010 – 30 May 2024
- Preceded by: Sally Keeble
- Succeeded by: Lucy Rigby

Personal details
- Born: Michael Tyrone Ellis; 13 October 1967 (age 59) Northampton, England
- Party: Conservative
- Education: University of Buckingham; City Law School
- Website: Official website

Sir Michael Tyrone Ellis (born 13 October 1967) is a British politician and barrister who served as Attorney General for England and Wales between September and October 2022, having previously served in the position from March to September 2021 during the maternity leave of Suella Braverman. A member of the Conservative Party, he previously served as Paymaster General from 2021 to 2022 and as Minister for the Cabinet Office from February to September 2022. Ellis served as the Member of Parliament (MP) for Northampton North from 2010 to 2024.

Ellis served in the May Government as Deputy Leader of the House of Commons from 2016 to 2018, as Parliamentary Under-Secretary of State for Arts, Heritage and Tourism from 2018 to 2019, and as Minister of State for Transport from May to July 2019. When Boris Johnson became Prime Minister in July 2019, he was appointed Solicitor General and, in September 2019, he was appointed to the Privy Council. He also served as Acting Attorney General from March to September 2021 after Braverman was designated as a Minister on Leave. On 15 September 2021, Ellis was appointed Paymaster General in Johnson's second cabinet reshuffle. In February 2022, he was promoted by Johnson to Minister for the Cabinet Office, a position with the right to attend Cabinet. Ellis was appointed Attorney General by Liz Truss on 6 September 2022, but was dismissed from the position by her successor, Rishi Sunak, the following month.

== Early life and career ==
Michael Ellis was born in Northampton on 13 October 1967 to a British Jewish family. He was privately educated at two independent schools: Spratton Hall School, a preparatory school in the village of Spratton in Northamptonshire, and at Wellingborough School, in the town of Wellingborough. He went on to study at the private University of Buckingham, where he obtained an upper-second class LL.B. degree in 1993, and won the Aylesbury Vale District Council Chairman's Prize for the Best Performance in Public Law that year.

At university, Ellis was a student editor of the Denning Law Journal. Whilst at university, he undertook an exchange programme in the United States at the College of William and Mary, Marshall-Wythe School of Law in Williamsburg, Virginia. After attending the Inns of Court School of Law in London, he was called to the Bar at Middle Temple in 1993. His legal practice as a barrister was based in Northampton, and his chamber's head office was in London.

== Political career ==
Ellis stood unsuccessfully as the Conservative candidate in the Park ward of Northampton Borough Council in 1995. However, he was elected in 1997 as a Conservative councillor on Northamptonshire County Council, representing the Northampton Park (now Parklands) Ward, winning the seat from his Labour Party rival by 44 votes. He served until the next election in May 2001, when he did not stand again. At the time of his election he was the youngest county councillor in Northamptonshire, at the age of 29.

Ellis became the Conservative parliamentary candidate for Northampton North in December 2006. This followed a public vote in an open primary, which was a relatively unusual selection mechanism at the time. Ellis was elected to Parliament in the 6 May 2010 general election gaining the seat with a majority of 1,936 and 34.1% of the vote, defeating the sitting Labour MP, Sally Keeble.

In November 2010, Ellis established an All Party Group on the Queen's Diamond Jubilee, which he chaired for the following three years. In this role, Ellis was responsible for organising a gift of a stained glass window of the Queen's coat of arms for the Queen from both Houses of Parliament.

In July 2010, he was first elected onto the Statutory Instruments (Joint Committee) and worked on the Draft Communications Data Bill during the 2012–13 Parliamentary session. Ellis was interviewed about this Bill with Jimmy Wales, co-founder of Wikipedia, on the Daily Politics programme on 11 December 2012. In February 2011, Ellis was first elected onto the House of Commons Home Affairs Select Committee.

On 11 September 2013, Ellis introduced the Medical Innovation (No.2) Bill, a private members bill to the House of Commons. The bill was designed to allow doctors more scope to innovate when treating cancer patients, but was criticised by a range of medical and legal bodies, patient groups and charities. The bill was withdrawn after its first reading, following an indication from the government that they would support it. Although the Conservative MP Dan Poulter MP, who was Parliamentary Under Secretary of State at the Department of Health, suggested in July 2014 that the Government was keen to support it, it failed to progress through the House of Commons after the Liberal Democrats declined to support it.

In March 2014, the chancellor of the exchequer, George Osborne announced in the House of Commons during the Budget Speech that a campaign Ellis had been conducting to secure extra funds to reduce potholes had succeeded and that a £200 million fund was being created to be distributed nationwide. In June 2014, it was announced that £3.3 million of this fund would be allocated to Northamptonshire by the Department for Transport, with various repairs in Northampton.

In July 2014, Ellis was successful in calling for the Parliamentary authorities to officially mark the assassination of a former member of Parliament for Northampton, Spencer Perceval, who had become Prime Minister, and who was shot and killed in the House of Commons in 1812. The Parliamentary authorities agreed to install a brass plaque in St Stephen's Hall commemorating the notable assassination and Ellis called this a "fitting tribute" to the former prime minister and historic Northampton figure.

In October 2014, the Northampton Chronicle & Echo newspaper reported that Ellis had been canvassing in Northampton when he came across a medical emergency and performed cardiopulmonary resuscitation (CPR) on a constituent.

Ellis was re-elected at the 2015 general election. He beat Sally Keeble by 3,245 votes (42%) to retain his seat in the House of Commons.

In May 2016, it emerged that Ellis was one of a number of Conservative MPs being investigated by police in the 2015 general election party spending investigation, for allegedly spending more than the legal limit on constituency election campaign expenses. However, in May 2017, the Crown Prosecution Service said that while there was evidence of inaccurate spending returns, it did not "meet the test" for further action.

In July 2016, Ellis was made an Assistant Whip (HM Treasury) and became Deputy Leader of the House of Commons.

Ellis was opposed to Brexit prior to the 2016 referendum. He later supported Theresa May's Brexit deal, and voted against ruling out a no-deal Brexit.

Ellis was re-elected again at the 2017 general election. However, his majority over Sally Keeble was reduced to 807 votes.

In February 2018, following the announcement that Northamptonshire County Council had brought in a "section 114" notice, putting it in special measures following a crisis in its finances, Ellis was one of seven local MPs who released a statement arguing that the problems with the authority were down to mismanagement from the Conservative councillors who led it rather than funding cuts from the Conservative Government. They further argued that government commissioners should take over the running of the council.

As Arts Minister in April 2019, Ellis placed an export bar on a 500-year-old drawing by Lucas van Leyden worth £11.4 million in a bid to keep the work of art in the United Kingdom. He also placed an export bar on a 17th-century baroque cabinet by Roman maker Giacomo Herman and a unique 18th-century harpsichord by Joseph Mahoon.

In the 2019 general election, his majority over Sally Keeble increased to 5,507.

In the House of Commons he has sat on the Statutory Instruments (Select and Joint Committees) and the Home Affairs Committee. He is a member of the Conservative Friends of Israel group, and has participated in delegations to raise concerns about an agreement relating to Iran's nuclear capabilities.

Ellis was appointed Queen's Counsel (QC) in July 2019.

When Suella Braverman was designated as a Minister on Leave in 2021, Ellis was appointed Attorney General and designated as also attending Cabinet.

On 8 February 2022, Ellis was appointed Minister for the Cabinet Office in addition to his role as Paymaster General.

Ellis supported Rishi Sunak during the July–September 2022 Conservative Party leadership election.

On 6 September 2022, Ellis was appointed Attorney General for England and Wales and Advocate General for Northern Ireland in the Truss ministry, succeeding Suella Braverman. He was dismissed on 25 October 2022 by the new prime minister Rishi Sunak.

Ellis was appointed a Knight Commander of the Order of the British Empire (KBE) in the 2023 Political Honours on 18 June for public and political service.

Speaking during a sitting at the House of Commons on the 8th of January 2024 , Ellis expressed views against proceedings instituted by South Africa against the State of Israel on 29 December 2023 which by then 800+ Global Groups and the 57-member states of the OIC had supported.

Ellis announced in May 2024 that he would stand down at the 2024 general election.

== Notes ==
Parliament of the United Kingdom
Preceded by Sally Keeble	Member of Parliament for Northampton North; 2010–2024	Succeeded by Lucy Rigby
Political offices
Preceded by Thérèse Coffey	Deputy Leader of the House of Commons; 2016–2018	Succeeded by Chris Heaton-Harris
Preceded by John Glen	Parliamentary Under-Secretary of State for Arts, Heritage and Tourism; 2018–2019	Succeeded by Rebecca Pow
Preceded by Jesse Norman	Minister of State for Transport; 2019	Succeeded by Chris Heaton-Harris
Preceded by Lucy Frazer	Solicitor General for England and Wales; 2019–2021	Succeeded by Lucy Frazer
Preceded by Suella Braverman	Attorney General for England and Wales; Acting; 2021	Succeeded by Suella Braverman
Preceded by Suella Braverman	Advocate General for Northern Ireland; Acting; 2021	Succeeded by Suella Braverman
Preceded by Lucy Frazer	Solicitor General for England and Wales; 2021	Succeeded by Alex Chalk
Preceded by Penny Mordaunt	Paymaster General; 2021–2022	Succeeded by Edward Argar
Preceded by Steve Barclay	Minister for the Cabinet Office; 2022	Succeeded by Edward Argar
Preceded by Suella Braverman	Attorney General for England and Wales; 2022	Succeeded by Victoria Prentis
Preceded by Suella Braverman	Advocate General for Northern Ireland; 2022	Succeeded by Victoria Prentis
