= Sir Charles Langham, 13th Baronet =

English landowner, photographer, ornithologist and entomologist

Herbert Charles Arthur Langham
- Born: 24 May 1870
- Died: 3 October 1951 (aged 81)

Sir Herbert Charles Arthur Langham, 13th Baronet (24 May 1870, Cottesbrooke, Northamptonshire – 3 October 1951, Tempo) was an English landowner, photographer, ornithologist and entomologist.

== Life ==
He was educated at Eton and later became a lieutenant in the Northamptonshire Regiment. He married Ethel (known in the family as Jenny) Tennent in 1893 and came to live in Tempo Manor, County Fermanagh, which she had inherited. The house and estate had been built by her grandfather, another naturalist, James Emerson Tennent. Langham was deputy lieutenant and justice of the peace for the county. In 1930 he was appointed High Sheriff of Fermanagh. After his death in 1951, his son John inherited his title and the Manor.

== Photography ==
Langham used a full-plate camera with a tripod and hand-held cameras manufactured by Leica and Voigtländer and other cameras from the American company Kodak. His subjects included the village and people of Tempo, the Alps, family and the female nude.

== Entomology ==
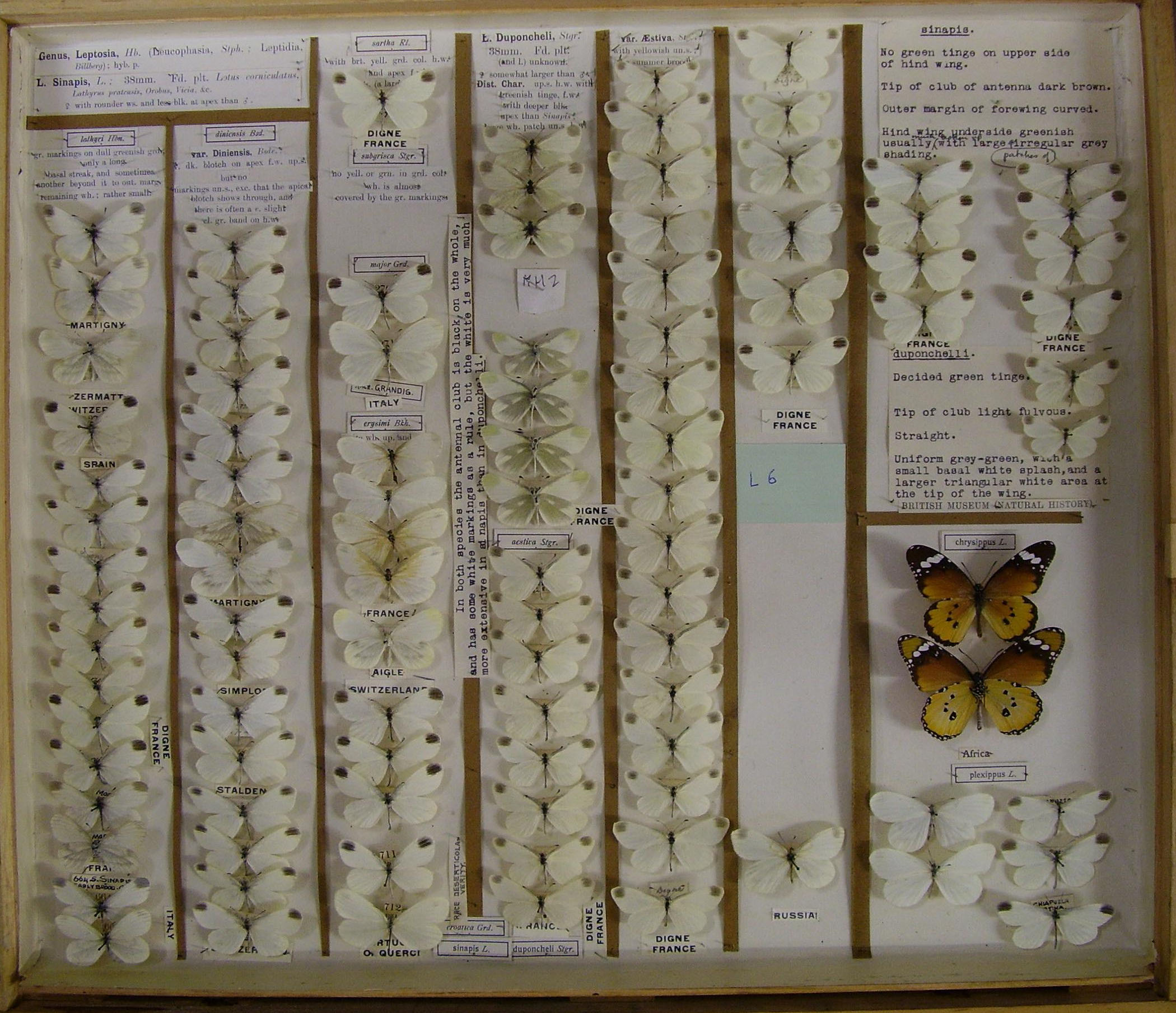
Drawer of Pieridae from the Langham collection, Ulster Museum

From 1890 Langham spent spring and summer in the French and Swiss Alps. He was primarily a collector. His butterfly and moth collection includes English and Irish specimens. The French Alps, Swiss Alps and Alpine collection is butterflies only and is augmented by specimens (purchased) from Scandinavia, Palestine (ex Philip Graves), Persia, North Africa and Russia.

== Sources ==
- Maguire, W. A and Nash, R. Heydays Fair-Days and Not-so-good Old Days: A Fermanagh Estate and Village in the Photographs of the Langham Family 1890-1918. Belfast: Friars Bush Press 1986. 83 pp. illustrated, paperback.

Baronetage of England
Preceded by Herbert Hay Langham	Baronet (of Cottesbrooke); 1909–1951	Succeeded by John Charles Patrick Langham
