= Maureen Colquhoun =

British politician (1928–2021)

Member of Parliament for Northampton North
- In office 28 February 1974 – 7 April 1979
- Preceded by: Constituency created
- Succeeded by: Tony Marlow

Personal details
- Born: Maureen Morfydd Smith; 12 August 1928 Eastbourne, Sussex, England
- Died: 2 February 2021 (aged 92) Eastergate, West Sussex, England
- Party: Labour
- Spouse: Keith Colquhoun (m. 1950; div. 1980)
- Domestic partner: Barbara Todd (1975–2020)
- Children: 3
- Education: London School of Economics

Maureen Morfydd Colquhoun (/kəˈhuːn/ kə-HOON; née Smith, 12 August 1928 – 2 February 2021) was a British economist and Labour politician. She was Britain's first openly lesbian member of Parliament (MP).

== Education and early political career ==
Smith was born in Eastbourne, Sussex, on 12 August 1928, where she was raised by her Irish mother, Elizabeth Smith, a single parent, in a politically active home. She was educated at a local convent school, a commercial college in Brighton, then at the London School of Economics and later worked as a literary research assistant. She joined the Labour Party in her late teens and worked as a civil servant, a literary research assistant and in an art gallery in Shoreham, West Sussex, before entering politics.

Colquhoun contested Tonbridge at the 1970 general election. She served as a councillor in Shoreham-by-Sea, from 1965 to 1974. The only female Shoreham councillor at the time, she was blocked by Conservative opponents from sitting on any of the authority's committees. In January 1970, a decision by Shoreham Urban District Council to block her from appointments as a primary school manager, school governor and library committee membership, on the grounds that she talked too much, was overruled.

== Parliamentary career ==
Colquhoun was elected as the Member of Parliament (MP) for Northampton North at the February 1974 general election, and identified with the Tribune Group, and served as the group's treasurer. Arguing in favour of creche facilities for female delegates at the following year's Labour conference, she said in October 1975: "It is outrageous that we have to ask for this. The Labour Party pays mere lip service to International Women's Day. ... Young women are deterred from coming because there is no provision for their babies. Those who do are not even allowed to bring their toddlers into the gallery."

Colquhoun told the Commons in 1975 that "we in parliament, who believe in making life better for women … believe that our aims must be translated into laws, which will be binding not merely on the present government but on future governments." In 1975, she also introduced the Balance of Sexes Bill with the objective to require men and women on public bodies in equal numbers. She had identified 4,500 jobs appointed by Ministers, and 174 public bodies that were almost entirely male. In her speech to introduce the second reading of the Bill, she commended changes that had been made to the nominations process for the 'central list' from which candidates for government bodies could be selected, although she doubted that it was sufficiently broad to encourage applications from all areas of society. The Bill did not become law.

In 1976, Colquhoun was among nine Labour MPs advocating in a letter to The Times an "alternative policy" on Northern Ireland, including the removal of British troops from the country.

In December 1976, Colquhoun punched a car park attendant in a row about a parking ticket.

Colquhoun drew a negative response from members of her constituency party, in an area with a significant non-white population, for appearing to defend Enoch Powell in January 1977. "I am rapidly concluding", she said, "that Mr Powell, whom I had always believed to be a racialist before I went into the House of Commons, is not one". She thought that sometimes it was wrong for members of her party to stop listening to what he was saying, and that the "real bogeymen are in the Labour Party" who do not improve the conditions for people in the multi-racial inner-cities. In February 1977, she expressed regret for her comments to her constituency party, withdrew any suggestion she supported Powell's opinions, and affirmed her support for a multi-racial society.

Colquhoun was a supporter of sex workers rights and was opposed to the laws that criminalised women who engaged in prostitution. In 1979, she introduced the Protection of Prostitutes Bill into the House of Commons, turning up with 50 sex workers in order to campaign for the decriminalisation of sex work by the abolition of prison sentences for soliciting. She also campaigned for elective abortion services and for women's prisons to be abolished.

=== Coming out and deselection ===
Colquhoun was Britain's first openly lesbian MP. In 1973, she left her husband, Sunday Times journalist Keith Colquhoun, who she had three children with during their marriage, for the publisher of Sappho magazine, Babs (Barbara) Todd. Colquhoun and Todd had grown close while they campaigned together on abortion amendments bills.

In February 1976, Colquhoun asked the then Commons Speaker George Thomas to refer to her as "Ms." instead of "Mrs". It was the first time such a request had been made. Mr Speaker Thomas responded by letter: "In the interests of the House, I think I must continue to use some form of prefix, but I will endeavour to slur it in such a way as to reduce, if not entirely eliminate, the audible distinction between 'Mrs' and 'Miss'".

The next month, Daily Mail gossip columnist Nigel Dempster contrived to gain an invitation to Colquhoun and Todd's housewarming party and she was outed by the newspaper. Colquhoun complained to the voluntary press regulator, the Press Council, who ruled against the complaint on the grounds that "the public has a right to know" about her sexuality. Colquhoun declared that the decision was contrary to the 1975 Sex Discrimination Act.

Colquhoun was deselected due to her sexuality and her feminist views; in late September 1977, members of her constituency party's General Management Committee voted by 23 votes to 18, with one abstention, to deselect her, citing her "obsession with trivialities such as women's rights". The local party chairman Norman Ashby said at the time: "She was elected as a working wife and mother ... this business has blackened her image irredeemably". Colquhoun responded that "my sexuality has nothing whatever to do with my ability to do my job as an MP" in an article for Gay News in October 1977. "Being a lesbian has ruined my political career," she told Woman's Own magazine in 1977. In a 1977 article for The Guardian, journalist Polly Toynbee wrote that "I find it impossible to believe that they would have removed Maureen Colquhoun had she still been quietly married."

The vote by her constituency party was overruled in January 1978, as supporters of Colquhoun appealed to the Labour Party's National Executive Committee (NEC), who agreed that Colquhoun had been unfairly dismissed owing to her sexual orientation. Colquhoun wanted to put the past behind her and work with her local party, but the Vice-Chair of the General Management Committee said he thought that was impossible as many members were unwilling to work for Colquhoun's re-election, the prospects for which he thought were not promising. At the 1979 general election, she lost her seat to the Conservative Tony Marlow on an 8% swing.

In 2017 she received a letter of apology from the constituency.

== Later life ==
Following Colquhoun's defeat as an MP, she worked as an assistant to other Labour MPs in the House of Commons, and was elected to Hackney London Borough Council for Wenlock in Shoreditch (now Hoxton West ward), serving as a member of the council from 1982 to 1990.

Colquhoun divorced her husband in 1980. Babs Todd was still her partner at Todd's death on 13 February 2020. Her ex-husband, Keith Colquhoun, who she had married in 1948, died from prostate cancer in 2010.

Colquhoun moved to the Lake District where she was a member of the Lake District's National Park Authority between 1998 and 2006. During that time, she campaigned for speed limits on Lake Windermere and argued that members of the park authority should disclose their membership of the Freemasons. Colquhoun also served as a parish councillor on Lakes Parish Council standing in the Ambleside ward until May 2015, when she was de-seated in that year's elections. By the time of her death, she had returned to Sussex.

Her autobiography, Woman in the House, was published in 1980. She commented in her memoirs that she had “an uncomfortable ability for upsetting equally my friends and my enemies”.

Colquhoun died from COVID-19 at a care home in Eastergate, West Sussex, on 2 February 2021, at the age of 92.

== Bibliography ==
- Times Guide to the House of Commons (1979)
- The Almanac of British Politics (1999)

Parliament of the United Kingdom
New constituency	Member of Parliament for Northampton North; February 1974 – 1979	Succeeded by Tony Marlow
