= Oxford Institute of Legal Practice =

Coordinates: 51.7526°N 1.2659°W

- Motto: Educating Lawyers in Oxford
- Type: Law school
- Active: 1993–2013
- Affiliations: University of Oxford (1993–2009); Oxford Brookes University (1993–2013)
- Location: Oxford, England
- Campus: Urban

The Oxford Institute of Legal Practice (OXILP) was a law school based in Oxford, England, which specialised in teaching the Postgraduate Diploma in Legal Practice, also known as the Legal Practice Course (LPC).

== History ==
The Oxford Institute of Legal Practice was established by the University of Oxford and Oxford Brookes University in 1993 as an Oxford-based law school specialised in the delivery of the Legal Practice Course (LPC), which culminates in the award of the Postgraduate Diploma in Legal Practice. OXILP diplomas were jointly awarded by the University of Oxford and Oxford Brookes University. Its students had access to the facilities of both universities and were alumni of both schools. It was based in King Charles House on Park End Street in central Oxford.

In 2000, OXILP was one of three LPC providers chosen by a group of eight City law firms to provide a new corporate-orientated LPC.

In 2008, the University of Oxford decided to exit the provision of the LPC and, effective 2010, OXILP became a part of the School of Social Sciences and Law of Oxford Brookes, and moved to Headington Hill Hall, a Grade II listed mansion dating back to 1771 owned by Oxford Brookes.

In March 2011, a former OXILP student who had failed its LPC course lost a bid for damages at the High Court for what she claimed had been "clearly negligent" tuition.

In March 2013, Oxford Brookes announced its intention to cease teaching the legal practice course at the end of the 2012/13 academic year, following a 50 percent decline in applications over the prior five years. The University of Law subsequently agreed to take over the provision of Oxford Brookes' legal practice course.
