= Spratton =

Village in Northamptonshire, England

Coordinates: 52.3233°N 0.9509°W

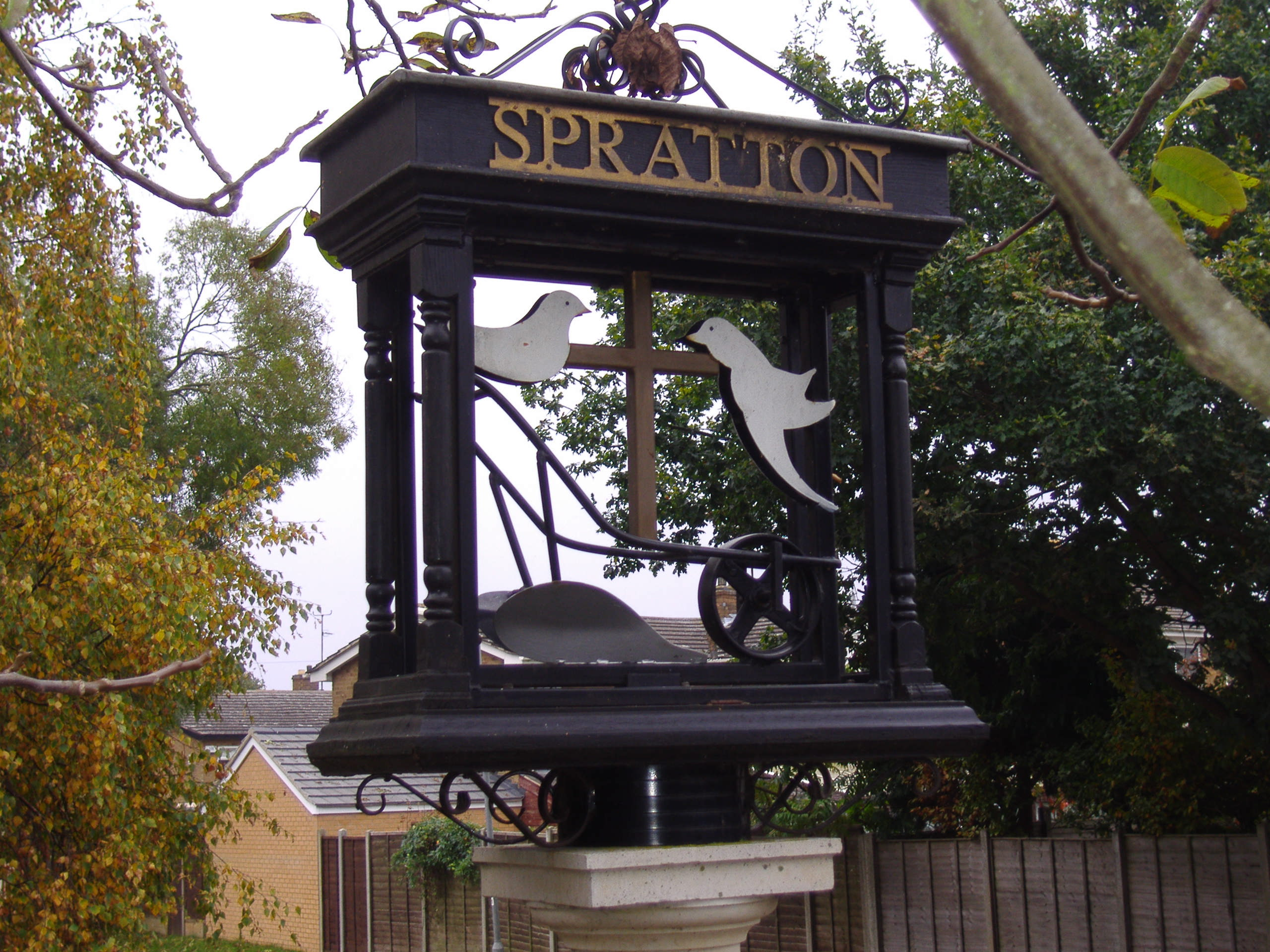
- Spratton village sign

- Location within Northamptonshire
- Population: 1,150 (2011)
- OS grid reference: SP7169
- Unitary authority: West Northamptonshire
- Ceremonial county: Northamptonshire
- Region: East Midlands
- Country: England
- Sovereign state: United Kingdom
- Post town: Northampton
- Postcode district: NN6
- Dialling code: 01604
- Police: Northamptonshire
- Fire: Northamptonshire
- Ambulance: East Midlands
- UK Parliament: Daventry

Spratton is a village and civil parish in the West Northamptonshire unitary authority area of Northamptonshire, England. Before changes in 2021 it was governed by Daventry District Council. At the time of the 2001 census, the parish's population was 1,099 people, increasing to 1,150 at the 2011 Census. Spratton is 7.1 miles north of Northampton, 6.5 miles from Long Buckby and 11.4 miles from Daventry. The village is situated on the A5199 road.

The village's name means 'Pole farm/settlement', either made of poles or perhaps a place where they were made or acquired.

== Landmarks ==
=== Parish Church ===
The parish church of Spratton is dedicated to St Andrew and stands on Brixworth Road. It is over 900 years old and is a Grade I listed building. Parts of the west wall of the church date from the Norman period, along with one of the windows in the church tower and the south door. The ecclesiastical parish is part of the diocese of Peterborough. The church, built from ironstone, stands on high ground in the centre of the village and has a tower with a spire. The chancel is 29 feet long by 15 feet wide. The earliest church built on the site dated from 1120, but it has been altered and remodelled considerably over the centuries. The interior of the church was restored in 1847 by Sir George Gilbert Scott, and the north porch rebuilt. The spire was taken down nearly to the base in 1870 and rebuilt. In the chancel is a fine alabaster effigy of Sir John Swinford who fought alongside the Black Prince and John of Gaunt in the Hundred Years' War. He died in 1371. The great-great-grandmother of George Washington was baptised in the church in 1602. There is a plaque saying this in the church.

=== Spratton Hall School ===
Spratton Hall is a Grade II listed building. The hall was built in the late 18th century. The hall is now used as an independent co-educational school called Spratton Hall School and was founded by K.C. Hunter and his wife Joan in 1951. There are currently over 400 pupils at the school aged 4–13 years old. Spratton Hall, the largest house in the village, is a Grade II listed building with grounds extending to 50 acres. The house was probably built in 1760 on the site of an earlier farmhouse. Constructed primarily with limestone from Kingsthorpe, it is a plain three-storey structure with a slate roof. Actor Tenniel Evans taught English and drama there for a short time in the early 1950s before returning to theatre. English international rugby union player Matt Dawson was a gap student at Spratton Hall from 1996 to 1997. Michael Ellis MP was educated there. Harry Mallinder (rugby union player) first played rugby there.

== Amenities ==
The village has one public house, the King's Head on Brixworth Road which also operates as a restaurant under the name of Brasserie 23. The well-known Saul's the butcher's, established in 1926 on Brixworth Road has now closed and has moved its premises to the farm shop near Chapel Brampton. Spratton Village Store is situated on Brixworth Road as is Dawn Mallard, Hairdresser.

== Events ==
Spratton used to host a folk music festival in July every year but stopped because they lost money 0 years in a row. Bands that have appeared include Capercaillie, Show of Hands, Oysterband and Peatbog Faeries. In addition to the music, there were craft stalls, food, children's entertainment and a bar serving real ales and ciders.

== Notable people ==
- The Victorian cricketer Charles Studd was born in the village in 1860.
- Amphillis Twigden, the great-great-grandmother of George Washington, first President of the United States, was born in the parish of Spratton at Little Creaton; she was baptised in Spratton Church on 2 February 1602.
- Northampton Saints players who have resided the village include Rugby World Cup winners Ben Cohen and Matt Dawson.
- Former England cricketer Devon Malcolm lives in the village.
- The suffragette Emily Davison was working as a live-in governess to the Moorhouse family at The Grange, Spratton, at the time of the 1901 census.
- Lt William Barnard Rhodes-Moorhouse VC RFC (1887–1915) was the first airman to be awarded a Victoria Cross. He lived at Spratton Grange. There is a commemorative stone in the Millennium Garden, Brixworth Road, near to the village sign.
