= Lingen (surname) =

Lingen is a surname. It may refer to:

- Clifford Lingen (1881–1907), English golfer
- Henry Lingen (1612–1662), Royalist military commander during the English Civil War and member of parliament
- Marissa Lingen (born 1978), American short fiction writer
- Ralph Lingen, 1st Baron Lingen (1819–1905), English civil servant
- Theo Lingen (1903–1978), German actor, film director and screenwriter
- Ursula Lingen (1928–2014), German-Austrian actress
- Michael van Lingen (born 1997), Namibian cricketer
- Kerstin von Lingen (born 1971), German military historian
