= Kempe baronets =

Extinct baronetcy in the Baronetage of England

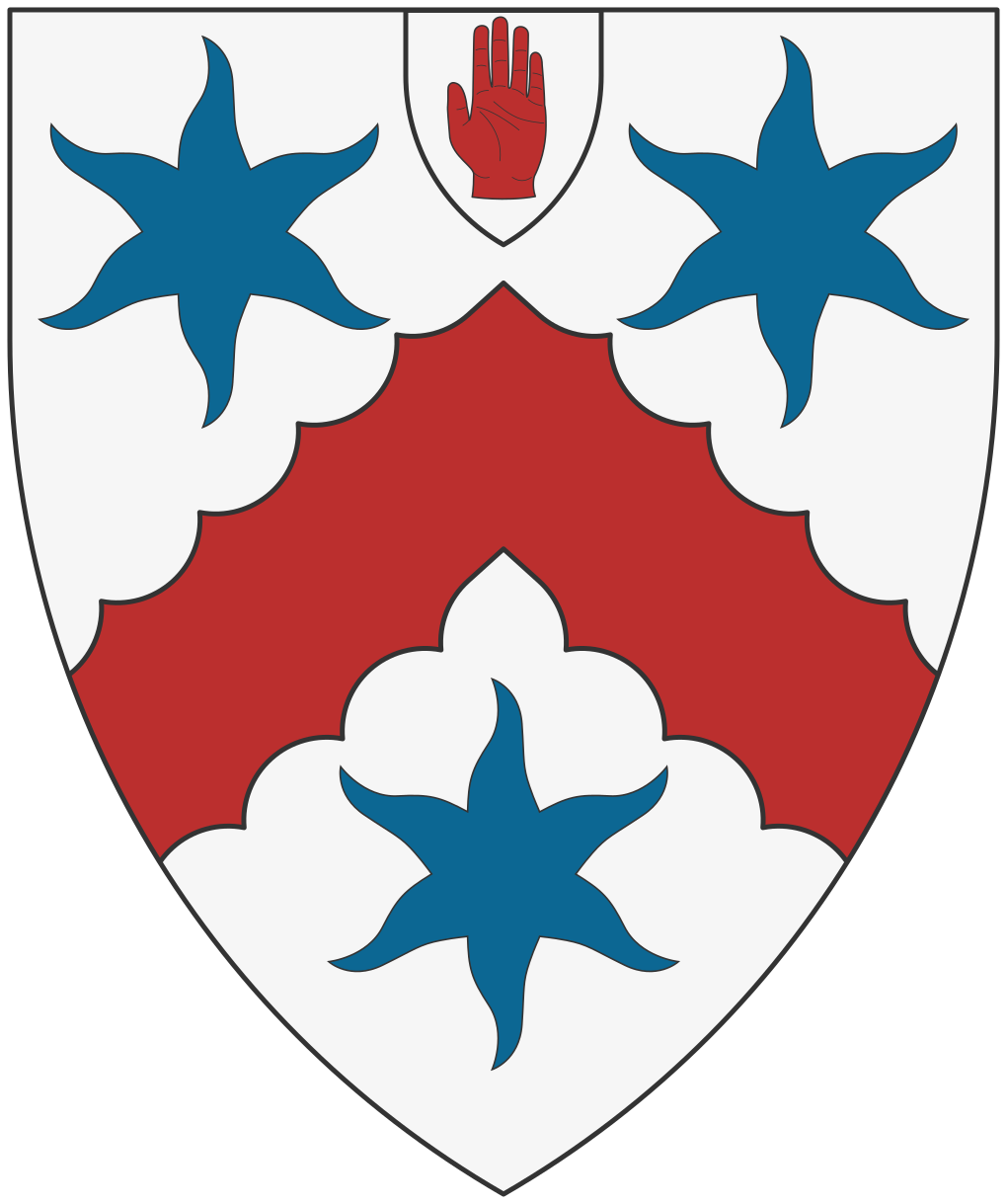
The coat of arms of Kempe of Pentlow, Baronets.

The Kempe Baronetcy, of Pentlow in the County of Essex, was a title in the Baronetage of England. It was created on 5 February 1627 for George Kempe. The title became extinct on his death in 1667. The head of the senior branch of the Kempe family was Spains Hall, Essex.

== Kempe baronets, of Pentlow (1627) ==
- Sir George Kempe, 1st Baronet (1602–1667)

== See also ==
- Kemp baronets
