= Cottesbrooke =

Village in Northamptonshire, England

Coordinates: 52.3551°N 0.9663°W

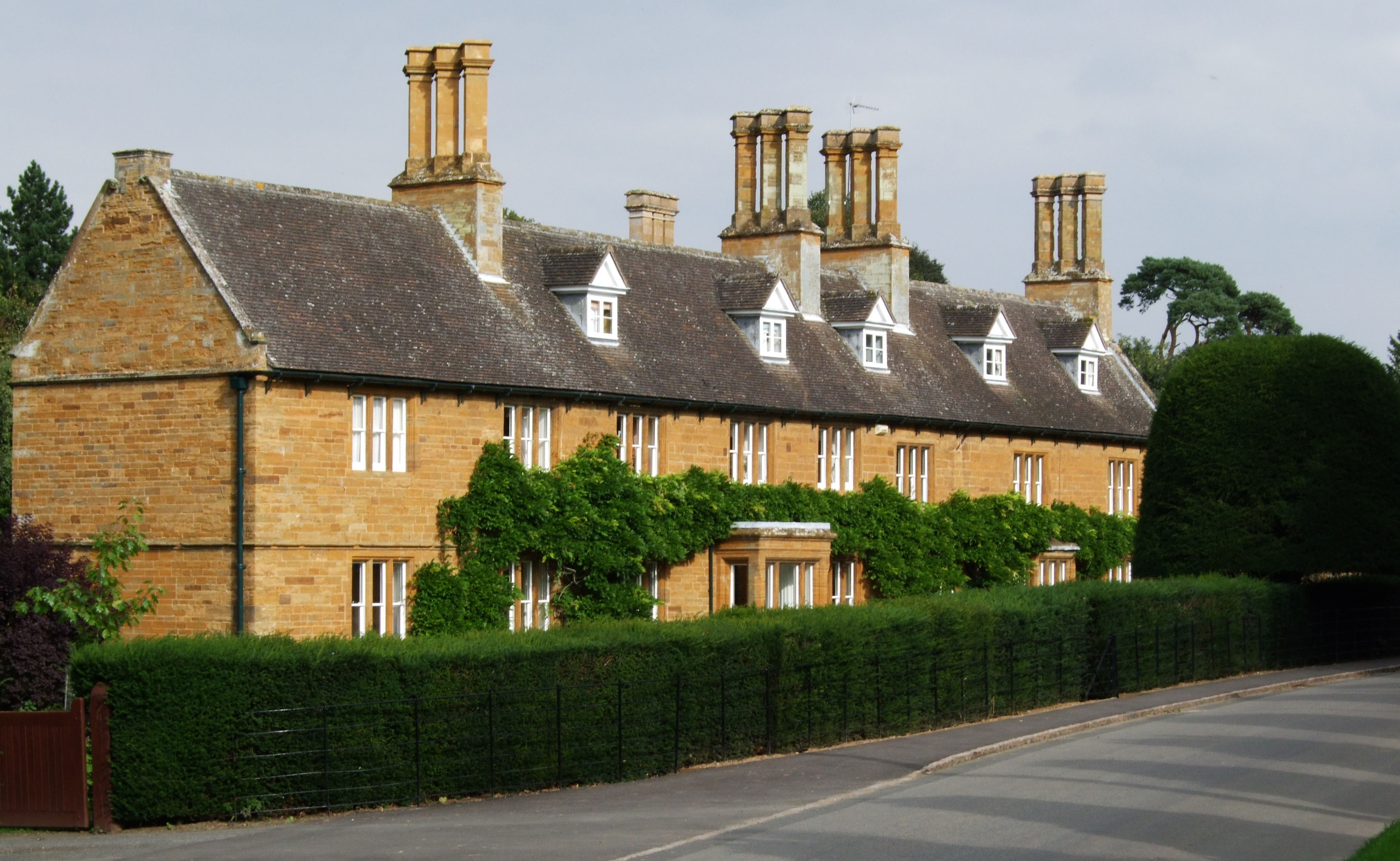
- The Grange

- Location within Northamptonshire
- Population: 143 (2011)
- OS grid reference: SP7073
  - London: 82 miles
- Unitary authority: West Northamptonshire
- Ceremonial county: Northamptonshire
- Region: East Midlands
- Country: England
- Sovereign state: United Kingdom
- Post town: Northampton
- Postcode district: NN6
- Dialling code: 01604
- Police: Northamptonshire
- Fire: Northamptonshire
- Ambulance: East Midlands
- UK Parliament: Daventry

Cottesbrooke is a village and civil parish in West Northamptonshire in England. At the time of the 2001 census, the parish's population was 144 people, falling marginally to 143 at the 2011 census.

The villages name means 'Cott's/Codd's brook'.

== Location ==
The village is around 1 mile north of Creaton village off the A5199 road which runs between Northampton and Leicester. Cottesbrooke can be reached by taking the road signposted to the east towards Cottesbrooke Hall in Creaton.

== Cottesbroke Estate ==
The manor of Codesbroc is listed in the Domesday Book of 1086, and was held in-chief from the king by Dodin, who held seven other manors as a mesne tenant, all in Northamptonshire. It consisted of 1 villager, 1 slave, 1 ploughland and the annual value to lord was 2 shillings in 1086. It was afterwards held, in whole or in part, by the family of de Buttivillar / Butvilleyne / Butvillain / Butwillam / Bontvillain. Part of the manor of Cottesbrooke, namely an estate called "Kalender" or "Kayland", was given to Sulby Abbey by William de Buttivillar, soon after the foundation of that abbey in 1155. It became the site of a monastic grange or cell, situated in the N.W. corner of the parish of Cottesbrooke, of Premonstratensian Canons, founded soon after 1155 and probably abandoned by 1291. Juliana Butvilleyne, the daughter and co-heiress of Sir Robert Butvilleyne of Cottesbrooke, married Robert Duke of Brompton in Suffolk, whose eventual heir was the Kempe family of Gissing in Norfolk (Kempe baronets), who quartered the arms of Butvilleyne (Argent, three crescents gules)

The estate with Cottesbrooke Hall, built 1702, was bought by the Langham baronets, a family of London Turkey merchants, in 1637, previously belonging to the Saunders family. The estate was sold in 1911 to Robert Bingham Brassey. In 1937 Cottesbrooke Hall was bought by its current owners, the MacDonald-Buchanan family, who in 1937-8 employed Lord Gerald Wellesley (later the 7th Duke of Wellington) to make alterations to the Hall, including changing the entrance front to the other side of the house.

== All Saints' Church ==
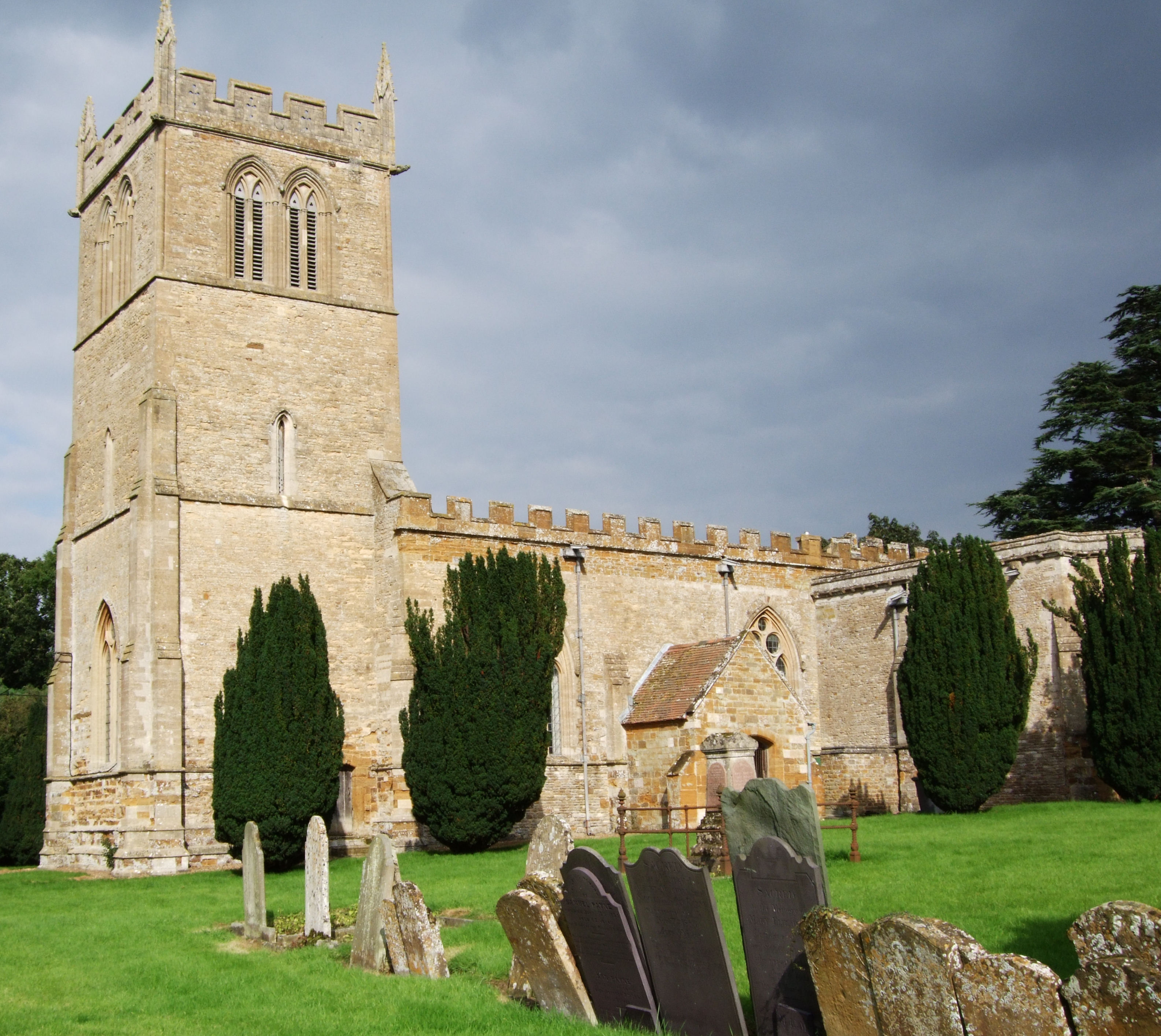
All Saints' Church

The parish church of All Saints is a Grade I listed building. A long, cruciform church of c. 1300, although the north transept has been demolished. Much restoration has been carried out on the building, most recently in 1959–60 by John Seely, Lord Mottistone. The large geometric windows cannot be relied upon and may have once been foliated. The south doorway and porch is in a good state, as is the West tower.

The tower has two-light Y-traced bell-openings supported by circular mullions, well preserved shafting on the interior windows with capitals, both carved and plain, and also a number of small exterior head-stops. It contains a ring of eight bells, comprising six bells cast by Henry Bagley II of Chacombe in 1702, with the heaviest bell (tenor) weighing 1,600 pounds (730 kg) and two lighter bells cast by the Whitechapel Bell Foundry in 1995.

The two east windows, glazed with coloured panes, are believed to be Georgian in origin, being referred to as 'recent' additions in documents dating from 1849. The nave roof has a ceiling, the painted imitation-plasterwork in the covings being of interest, believed to be 18th-century work. During the last restoration, the plaster ceilings in the chancel and the remaining south transept were removed, exposing roof timbers from the 15th century.

There is a reredos and communion table by Lord Mottistone in the Wrenian style. These are placed halfway along the chancel so that a vestry is formed behind. A wooden font and cover dates from the 18th century and is kept at Cottesbrooke Hall and may be viewed by appointment. The church has one of few examples of a three-tier Georgian pulpit in the county and country, and is fitted with fine box pews. There is a staircase with balusters leading to the Squire's pew in the south transept of similar date. There is a small 'squint', with delicately carved hood moulding, in the junction between the chancel and the south transept. The church plate, consisting of a Cup and Paten from 1635 and also two Flagons and a Breadholder of 1665, is held at Cottesbrooke Hall.

A number of large monuments include John Rede, d.1604 in the south chapel is of alabaster stone with a recumbent effigy in marble on a partially rolled mat. A flat arch spans two columns, with a large cartouche beneath. On the ground are the figures of ten kneeling infants. Sir John Langham, (d.1671) and his wife's monument is also in the south chapel. It is free-standing in grey and white marble with good cartouches on the tomb-chest. There are two recumbent effigies with much carving. The monument cost £290 in 1676 and is by Thomas Cartwright.

Other Langham family monuments are: Mrs Mary Langham, d.1773, in the chancel with a classical urn by Moore; Sir James, d.1795, with a long inscription and standing female figure beside an urn; Lady Langham, d.1807, with a figure of Faith standing by Bacon Junior; Marianne, d.1809, the memorial made in 1810, a simple a draped urn, by Bacon Junior; Lady Langham, d.1810, with number of columns and a depiction of the rock of Golgotha; Sir William, d.1812, a free-standing monument in the nave of Coade stone, by Bacon Junior.

== Other sources ==
- Northamptonshire Villages, the NCFWI
