= Sir John Charles Patrick Langham, 14th Baronet =

Irish artist

Sir John Charles Patrick Langham, 14th Baronet (30 June 1894 – 1972) was an Irish landowner and botanical artist.

== Life ==
John Charles Patrick Langham was born on 30 June 1894 at Tempo Manor, County Fermanagh. His parents were Sir Charles Langham, 13th Baronet and Ethel Sarah "Jennie" Tennant. His maternal grandfather was Sir William Emerson Tennent, 2nd Baronet of Tempo Manor. He attended Rugby and the Royal Military College, Sandhurst, and went on to work as a land agent for a number of large Irish estates including Coolattin, County Wicklow. He married Rosamond Christabel Rashleigh on 1 October 1930. Langham succeeded his father as Baronet after his death in 1951.

Langham was a botanical artist, whose work was preserved at the family home, including eight volumes of watercolour studies.

Langham died in 1972 and was succeeded by his son, Captain Sir James Michael Langham, 15th Baronet.

Baronetage of England
Preceded by Charles Langham	Baronet (of Cottesbrooke); 1951–1972	Succeeded by James Michael Langham
