= Sir James Langham, 7th Baronet =

English politician

Sir James Langham, 7th Baronet (31 January 1736 – 7 February 1795) was an English politician who sat in the House of Commons from 1784 to 1790.

Langham was the son of William Langham and his wife Mary Drought, daughter of Anthony Drought. He inherited the baronetcy from his uncle Sir John Langham, 6th Baronet in 1766. He was sheriff of Northamptonshire in 1767, and in 1784 Langham was elected Member of Parliament for Northamptonshire, holding the seat until 1790.

Langham married Juliana Musgrave, daughter of George Musgrave (1717–1742) of Nettlecombe and Combe Sydenham in Somerset, and sister and heiress of Thomas Musgrave (1741–1766) of Combe Sydenham, Stogumber, Somerset. By his wife he had children including Sir William Langham, 8th Baronet, eldest son and heir; and Sir James Langham, 10th Baronet, younger son.

Langham died at the age of 59.

Parliament of England
Preceded by Thomas Powys; Lucy Knightley	Member of Parliament for Northamptonshire; 1784–1790; With: Thomas Powys	Succeeded by Thomas Powys; Francis Dickins
Baronetage of England
Preceded by John Langham	Baronet (of Cottesbrooke); 1766–1795	Succeeded by William Langham
