= Heavy Anti-Aircraft Gun Station 385 =

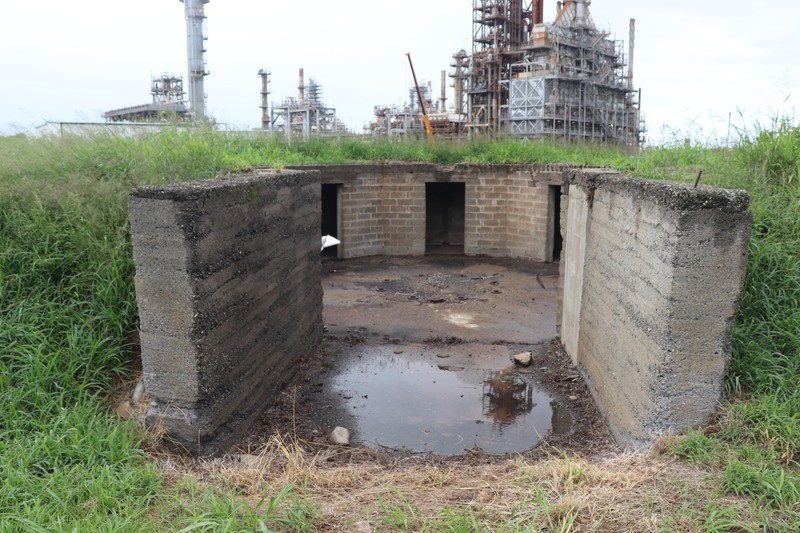
- Entrance to southeast gun emplacement’s gun pit, looking southeast, 2019

- Location within Queensland
- 27.4131°S 153.1538°E
- Location: 50 Pritchard Street, Lytton, City of Brisbane, Queensland, Australia

History
- Design period: 1939–1945 (World War II)
- Built: 1943, Heavy Anti–Aircraft Gun Station, 1943, Views to

Queensland Heritage Register
- Official name: Heavy Anti-Aircraft Gun Station 385, Lytton; Lytton Heavy Anti-Aircraft battery emplacement; Gun Station 385, 6 Heavy Anti-Aircraft Battery; 6 (385) Australian Heavy Anti-Aircraft Battery; 385th Troop, 6th Australian Heavy Anti-Aircraft Battery
- Type: state heritage
- Designated: 28 June 2019
- Reference no.: 650230
- Type: Defence: Anti-aircraft defence; Defence: Gun emplacement/battery
- Theme: Maintaining order: Defending the country
- Builders: Allied Works Council

Heavy Anti-Aircraft Gun Station 385 is a heritage-listed former anti-aircraft defence and gun emplacement at 50 Pritchard Street, Lytton, City of Brisbane, Queensland, Australia. It was built from 1943 by the Allied Works Council. It is also known as Lytton Heavy Anti-Aircraft battery emplacement and Gun Station 385. It was added to the Queensland Heritage Register on 28 June 2019.

== History ==
Heavy Anti-Aircraft (HAA) Gun Station 385 was constructed at Lytton in 1943 to defend Brisbane against Japanese air attack during World War II (WWII), replacing a 1942 gun station at Colmslie. The Lytton area, on the southeast side of the Brisbane River mouth and part of the traditional land of the Turrbal and Jagera peoples, has long played a part in the defence of Queensland. In 2019, Gun Station 385 is located within the Caltex oil refinery to the east of Fort Lytton National Park, and retains: four above-ground gun emplacements for 3.7 inch (94mm) anti-aircraft guns, consisting of octagonal gun pits, formed of cinder blocks and concrete, surrounded on seven sides by earth revetments; and a semi-underground concrete command post, comprising an underground plotting room and an adjacent open concrete pit with three compartments. It has the most intact gun emplacements of the eight known 3.7 inch gun stations active in Brisbane between 1942 and 1944, and is also one of the most visible and intact 3.7 inch gun stations in Queensland.

Although WWII started in September 1939, Australia was under little threat of air attack until late 1941. On 8 December 1941, the United States of America entered the war, following the previous day's bombing of the American fleet at Pearl Harbor by Japanese carrier-borne aircraft. Simultaneously, Japanese forces launched assaults on Thailand, the Philippines and the British colony of Malaya. The sudden fall of Singapore on 15 February 1942 and the rapid Japanese advance through the islands of the Netherlands East Indies (NEI) raised fears of air attacks on Australia. The first Japanese air raid on Darwin in the Northern Territory occurred on 19 February 1942, while air raids on Broome in Western Australia occurred on 3 March 1942. Japanese air raids on other targets in Australia seemed likely, and an invasion of Australia was also feared. The attack on Darwin was carried out by aircraft launched from four of the six aircraft carriers involved in the attack on Pearl Harbor, plus land-based aircraft flying from the NEI. Casualties at Broome included Dutch civilians, evacuated from the NEI, who were killed when their flying boats were strafed and sunk in Roebuck Bay. Japan briefly considered invading Australia (an idea promoted by the Imperial Japanese Navy, but rejected by the Japanese Army due to a lack of resources) before shelving that option in March 1942, in favour of isolating Australia from the United States by capturing Port Moresby, and later Fiji, New Caledonia and the Samoan Islands.

Due to its position in the north of Australia, Queensland was at risk of land-based air attack (launched from airfields in the NEI or New Guinea), as well as attacks launched from aircraft carriers. As a result of the growing fear of Japanese air raids, the Queensland Government issued the Protection of Persons and Property Order No.1, gazetted 23 December 1941, which ordered the Brisbane City Council (BCC), and other local authorities near the coast, to build air raid shelters. All Queensland coastal state schools were closed in late January 1942, and although most reopened on 2 March 1942, student attendance was optional until the war ended. A policy of voluntary evacuation of women and children from Queensland coastal areas was also implemented on 27 January 1942.

Air raid shelters were a passive defence, and Brisbane – as well as other ports such as Townsville and Cairns – also needed active defence of the type provided by fighter squadrons and anti-aircraft guns. After the first US forces arrived in Brisbane in the Pensacola Convoy on 22 December 1941, the city became a major supply base and staging point for the war in the South West Pacific, and the largest US naval base in continental Australia. Brisbane was the location of various units’ headquarters, plus supply and ordnance depots, military transit camps and hospitals, research facilities, naval bases (including a US submarine base), munitions factories, military airfields, and aircraft assembly and maintenance facilities. In January 1942, Brisbane became Base Section 3 of the United States Army Forces in Australia (USAFIA), headquartered in Somerville House, South Brisbane. After General Douglas MacArthur, Supreme Commander, South West Pacific Area (SWPA), arrived in Brisbane in July 1942, the city also hosted his General Headquarters in the AMP building at the corner of Queen and Edward Streets (now known as MacArthur Central). General Sir Thomas Blamey, Commander Allied Land Forces, had his Advanced Land Headquarters at the Forgan Smith Building at the new St Lucia campus of University of Queensland (which, although built, had not opened due to the war). Queensland played a major role in the build-up of troops and supplies for the joint US-Australian counter-offensive in New Guinea, which occurred after the Japanese advance was checked at the Battle of Milne Bay and the Kokoda track campaign (August–September 1942).

Prior to WWII, efforts to defend Australia from air attack included raising the 1st Anti-Aircraft Battery (at George's Heights, Sydney), in 1926. "Battery" in this sense refers to an artillery unit and its personnel, but the term has also been used historically to refer to a number of cannons working as a group on the battlefield or in a fortification (e.g., the "Georges Head Battery" at Mosman in Sydney). The 3 inch gun, a naval gun which was adapted for use against aircraft during World War I (WWI), could fire a 16-pound (7.3 kg) shell to a 22,000 ft (6.7 km) maximum altitude, at a rate of 16–18 rounds per minute. This unit was later armed with British 3 inch (76.2mm) guns. By the beginning of WWII in September 1939, four more batteries had been raised, and, by the end of 1940, Australia's anti-aircraft units were also equipped with 3.7 inch (94mm) guns, introduced in Britain in the late 1930s. Australia had manufactured 165 of these guns at Maribyrnong, Victoria, by November 1941. The 3.7 inch gun could fire a 28-pound [13 kg] shell to a maximum altitude of 30,000 ft (9 km), at 10–20 rounds per minute. The Australian 3.7 inch guns were manufactured with static mounts, rather than the mobile version (wheeled, with folding outriggers) produced in Britain and Canada.

In 1942, Brisbane's HAA defence included US and Australian units, utilising both 3 inch and 3.7 inch guns, while Australian Light Anti-Aircraft (LAA) units were armed with 40mm Bofors. A Bofors 40mm gun could fire a 2-pound (900g) shell, at 120 rounds per minute. The US 94th Coast Artillery Regiment arrived in Brisbane on 29 March 1942, and sited its 3-inch guns at:

- Heath Park (in East Brisbane)
- Hendra
- Holy Cross laundry in Wooloowin
- Amberley airfield
- Archerfield airfield
- Cannon Hill

Machine guns and searchlights were deployed at multiple sites around Brisbane. The 94th CA Regiment left Brisbane in June 1942. Australian HAA units later replaced the US units at Amberley, Archerfield and Heath Park, but Australian factories were not able to produce enough heavy and light AA guns for Brisbane to receive an allocation of weapons until May 1942.

The AA guns were sited to defend Brisbane's airfields (Eagle Farm and Archerfield), the US Navy's submarine base at Teneriffe (established April 1942), and any other shipping on the river. As Japanese aircraft were likely to use the Brisbane River as a navigational aid, guns were sited near the river. By July 1942, the Australian Army controlled three 3.7 inch gun stations, located at Colmslie (GS 385), Victoria Park (GS 386), and Hendra (GS 389), forming a triangle roughly centred on Hamilton; plus two 3 inch gun stations, at Amberley (GS 391) and Archerfield (GS 392). In July 1942, Australian Army units within the Queensland Line of Communication Area included the Brisbane AA Group and the 2/2 HAA Regiment, along with the 113th and 114th LAA regiments.

A map of gun stations in the Brisbane area, circa December 1942, shows there were five active 3.7 inch gun stations by this time. Three were located north of the Brisbane River, at Victoria Park, Hendra, and Pinkenba (GS 388); while two were south of the river, at Heath Park (East Brisbane), and Colmslie. A 3-inch gun station was shown as active at Archerfield, while Bofors guns were deployed, close to both banks of the river, at 11 sites between Teneriffe and Pinkenba. Locations for 3.7 inch gun stations "under construction or construction about to commence" included Balmoral Park (GS 387), Lytton (GS 385), and Hemmant (GS 390) - all south of the river. Notes indicated that the Colmslie gun station was to be moved to Lytton; and that Pinkenba was a mobile gun station, with a "static" site to be built (where the guns would be bolted to a concrete base). Positions for four guns at Heath Park are visible in an aerial photograph. The Colmslie gun station was located southwest of the Commonwealth Acetate of Lime Factory, part of which was used by 6 HAA Battery during 1942–43.

During the war, other 3.7 inch gun stations were constructed in Queensland: at Townsville and Cairns, as well as at military airfields at Mareeba Airfield; Iron Range (now Lockhart River Airport); Jacky Jacky (now Northern Peninsula Airport); and Horn Island Airport. In late 1942 Townsville was the principle port for those Allied troops serving in the New Guinea campaign. Townsville had 3.7 inch gun stations at Aitkenvale, The Strand, Jimmy's Lookout, Mt St John, Pallarenda, and by the Ross River mouth. There was also a 3.7 inch gun station at Nelly Bay, Magnetic Island. The airfields each had two gun stations, each with four 3.7 inch guns. Although Brisbane's gun stations never fired at enemy aircraft, Townsville's guns engaged Japanese aircraft in May–July 1942 during the bombing of Townsville. Horn Island was attacked a number of times between March 1942 and June 1943. Japanese aircraft carrier losses at the Battle of the Coral Sea in May 1942 and the Battle of Midway in June 1942, prevented any Japanese carrier-borne air attacks on Queensland.

In 1943, GS 385 was relocated from Colmslie to the Commonwealth defence reserve at Lytton, on the southeast side of the Brisbane River mouth. The new site was within the former town of Lytton, surveyed in 1859 when a customs station was also established on the river. The town never thrived; Fort Lytton, a coastal artillery fortification, was constructed to the northwest in 1880–82; while a military redoubt, to protect the rear of Fort Lytton from a land assault, was constructed east of the town in 1885, on Lytton Hill. The 120 acre (48ha) Lytton Defence Reserve was established in 1887, and was later enlarged, absorbing the town, which was resumed in 1891 and 1900. The defence reserve passed into Commonwealth ownership after 1901. The Lytton Quarantine Station was also established, south of Fort Lytton, in 1913–14; and Brisbane's first airfield operated on the flats between the quarantine station and Lytton Hill from 1919 to 1931. The Lytton Hotel operated in the town from 1878 until c. 1905. GS 385 was built on the former Section VI of Lytton, just east of Vivian Street.

The new gun station at Lytton, like most WWII Australian defence construction projects, was built by civilian labour, organised through the Allied Works Council (AWC). The AWC was formed in February 1942; and labour was sourced through the Civil Constructional Corps, formed in April that year. Most of Brisbane's HAA gun stations, including Lytton, were constructed by the Queensland Main Roads Commission (MRC), as requested by the AWC, with the BCC also doing some work. The BCC did the initial work at Balmoral and Hendra, while the MRC worked on the gun stations at Victoria Park, Colmslie, Hemmant, Balmoral Park, Hendra, Lytton, Archerfield, and Amberley.

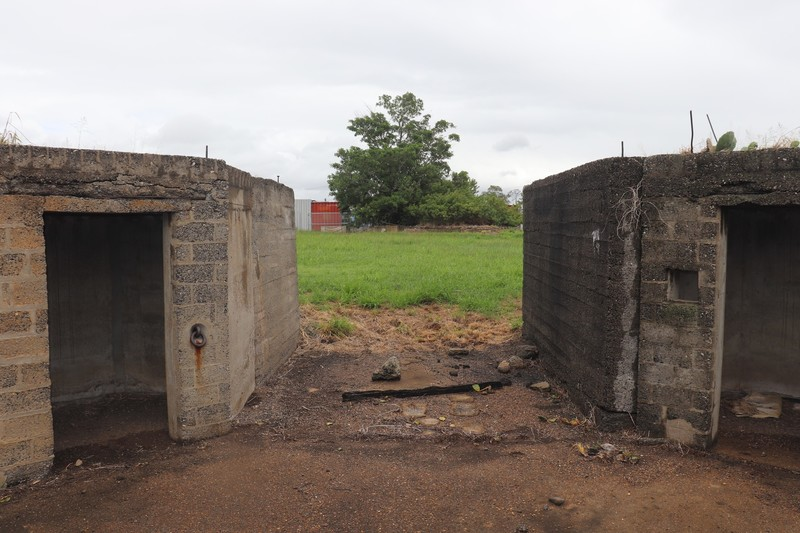
East gun emplacement's gun pit, looking west through entrance towards command post, 2019

Queensland's static HAA gun stations typically consisted of a semi-underground command post, set to one side of a 180-degree arc of four octagonal gun emplacements, with about 100 feet (30 m) between the centres of the emplacements. There were also two to four earth-covered reserve magazines, set outside the arc of gun emplacements. Brisbane's static gun stations were built with reinforced concrete or cinder blocks; and their gun pits could either be built above-ground (such as at Lytton), or set in-ground (such as at Hemmant). A gun crew usually consisted of 10–12 men.

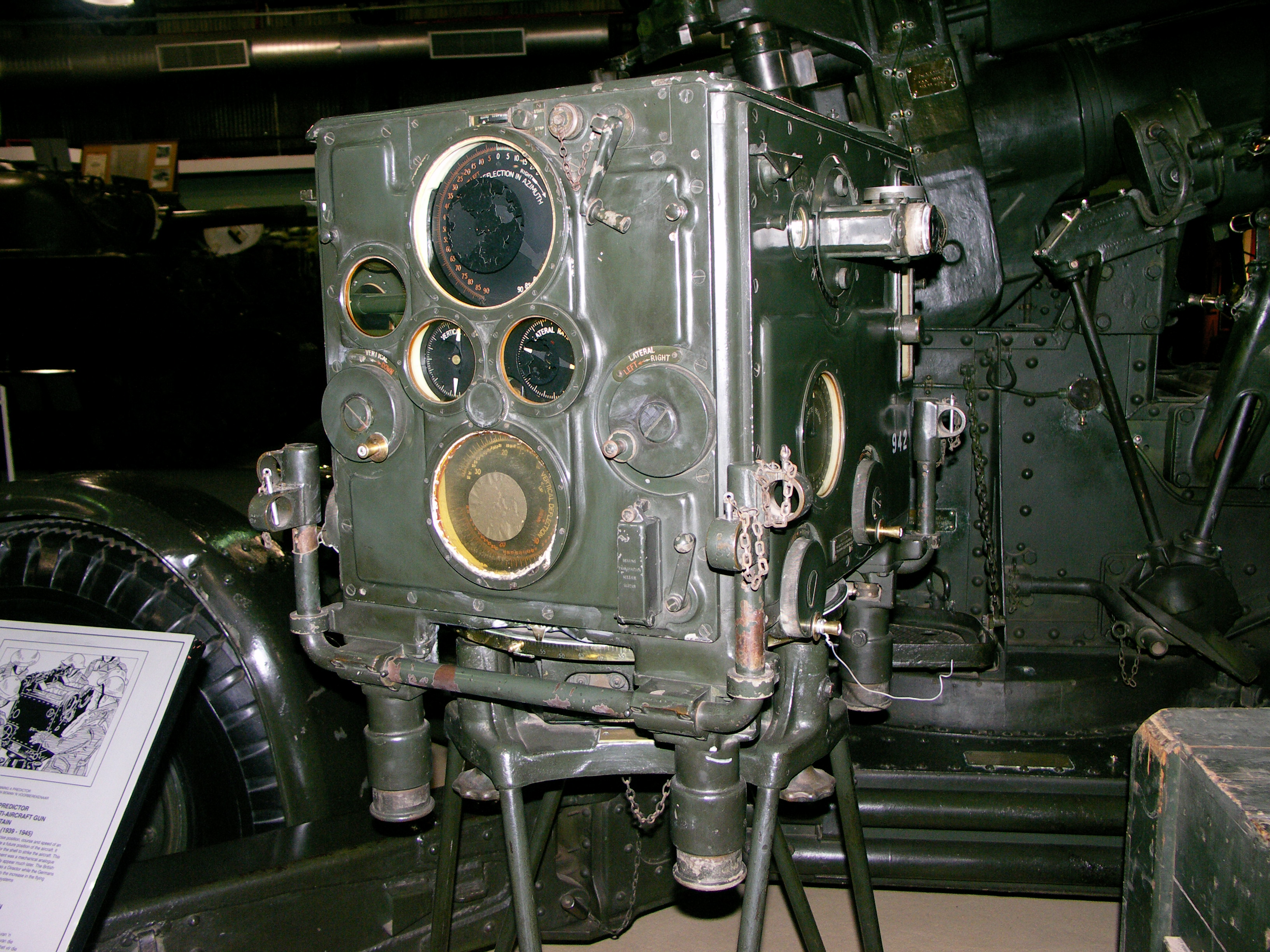
Number 1 Mark III Predictor used with the QF 3.7 inch AA gun

A typical command post included: an underground plotting room, entered from an external open pit which had separate compartments for a rangefinder, an aircraft spotter's identification telescope, and a predictor. To be effective against a flying target which was moving rapidly in three dimensions, anti-aircraft guns needed to fire together, not individually. A predictor (a mechanical analog computer) was used to calculate where the aircraft would be when the shells arrived. It was manually programmed to follow a target, taking into account its course and speed, as well as the shells' direction and velocity. This information was relayed automatically to the gun layers in each emplacement, so that all guns were trained on the same target area. The target's height was deduced by the rangefinder, so that the fuses of each shell could be set to explode at the correct height. Without a predictor, a gun station was ineffective, but no predictors were manufactured in Australia until 1942. Lytton's rangefinder was a No.3 Mark IV Type UB7. Lytton's predictor resembles the No.1 Mark III Predictor held by the South African National Museum of Military History in Johannesburg. The identification telescope at Lytton was probably a Mark III, as seen in a 1944 photograph of the Hendra gun station. Part of such a telescope can be seen (to the right) in a 1943 photograph of the open pits of Lytton's command post.

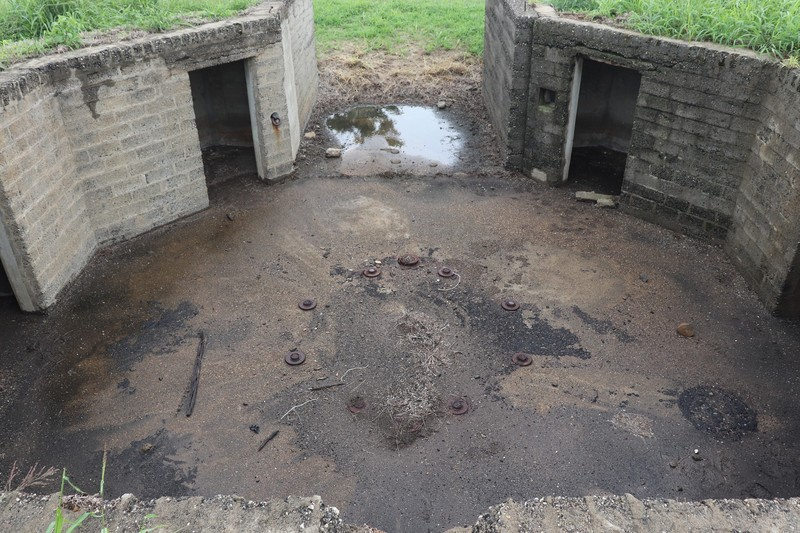
Interior of southeast gun emplacement's gun pit, looking northwest, 2019

Each emplacement had an entrance corridor on one side, leading into the gun pit of the emplacement; a central group of bolts for securing the gun's hexagonal metal base plate to the concrete; and surrounding lockers in the walls of the gun pit, for "ready" ammunition, fuses etc. Photographs of the Lytton gun station, taken in November 1943, show doors on each of the ammunition lockers in the gun emplacements; and pairs of cinder block walls within the entrance corridor to each emplacement - protecting the gunners from any bomb splinters from that direction.

Gun Station 385 at Lytton was a sub-unit of 6 HAA Battery. By January 1943, AA units in the South Queensland AA Group included the 2/2 HAA Regiment, 6 and 38 HAA Batteries, and the 113 and 144 LAA regiments. 38 HAA Battery was formed in late 1942, to take over those gun stations north of the Brisbane River from 6 HAA Battery. Funding of £7000 was approved to construct a 3.7 inch gun station, consisting of four emplacements, one command post, and two "shell stores" (reserve magazines), at Lytton in February 1943. One reserve magazine was built north of the gun emplacements, and one to the southwest. Later, another £4,430, for accommodation for 3 officers and 72 other ranks, was approved. The request for camp buildings, located north of the gun emplacements, included: a kitchen and mess for 75 people, all ranks; an administration building; a sleeping hut for 45 women of the Australian Women's Army Service (AWAS); latrines, baths and laundry for the AWAS; and latrines, showers and ablutions (male), 30 all ranks. An existing house on the site was used as the officers' mess. The gun emplacements, command post, and reserve magazines were under construction by May 1943; and the requested accommodation existed by May 1944, when the gun station's earth cover (revetments for the gun emplacements and reserve magazines) was also present. The accommodation existed either side of Rose Street. By May 1944, two extra quarters and a recreation hut, not mentioned in the 1943 list of buildings, were present for a total of 18 buildings in all, including the house and its outbuildings. By November 1944, there was also a cost overrun of £1,537 on the gun station. Extra work had included: 3" by 1" (7.6 cm by 2.5 cm) hardwood trays in the magazine racks, sound-corrective measures in the command post, and vents in lieu of plain (probably for the roof of the command post).

The AWAS, formed in August 1941, provided personnel to coastal artillery units from July 1942; and to Home Defence AA and searchlight units from August that year. The AWAS operated radars, predictors, height and range finders, telescopes, searchlights and engines, and undertook fire control, computing, plotting, and aircraft spotting duties. In artillery units, searchlight batteries had the highest percentage of women. As the threat to Australia diminished, the AWAS were replaced by the VDC at HAA gun stations during 1944. The AWAS who staffed the Lytton HAA emplacement were trained locally, at the requisitioned Blackheath Children's Home, at Oxley, which was also the headquarters of 6 HAA Battery until it moved to "Belbowrie" at Corinda, in December 1942, and to Hemmant in November 1943.

GS 385 was in service by August 1943. Partially manned by Volunteer Defence Corps (VDC) soldiers from this time, Brisbane's gun stations were redesignated as Troops (Static), with their parent batteries under the command of Headquarters, Brisbane AA Group. By late 1943, 6 HAA Battery (Static) controlled the three 3.7 inch gun stations south of the Brisbane River: at Balmoral (387 Troop); Hemmant (390 Troop); and Lytton (385 Troop). North of the Brisbane River, 38 HAA Battery (Static) controlled the three 3.7 inch gun stations at: Victoria Park (386 Troop); Hendra (389 Troop); and Pinkenba (388 Troop). An artillery "troop" is a sub-unit of a battery. 385 Troop at Lytton was briefly under the command of 38 HAA Battery, August–October 1943. The gun station at Heath Park seems to have been replaced by the new gun station at Balmoral. The 3 inch gun stations at Amberley (391 Troop) and Archerfield (392 Troop), also controlled by 6 HAA Battery (Static), were disbanded in late 1943. The six active 3.7 inch gun stations now formed a rough oval with its centre south of Eagle Farm.

By early 1944, when the fear of Japanese air attack had diminished, Brisbane was defended by 24 x 3.7 inch guns (in six gun stations); 12 x 40mm Bofors; and 21 searchlights (Townsville also had 24 x 3.7 inch guns; and Cairns 12). In March 1944, a report to the Commonwealth's Defence Committee recommended reducing the number of anti-aircraft guns in Cairns and Townsville, as they were now out of range of Japanese land-based bombers. In early 1944, VDC personnel formed complete "shadow units", which could fully man the guns. From mid-1944 onwards, the AA groups in Darwin, Cairns, Townsville, Brisbane, Newcastle, Port Kembla and Melbourne were disbanded, with all AA defences in Brisbane disbanded in late 1944. For example, the shadow unit 6 HAA Battery (VDC) was formed, while the original 6 HAA Battery (Static) became 6 HAA Battery (LE), a training and maintenance cadre only. All Brisbane AA units disbanded in December 1944. All static AA defences in Australia were disbanded in November 1944, except in Sydney and Western Australia.

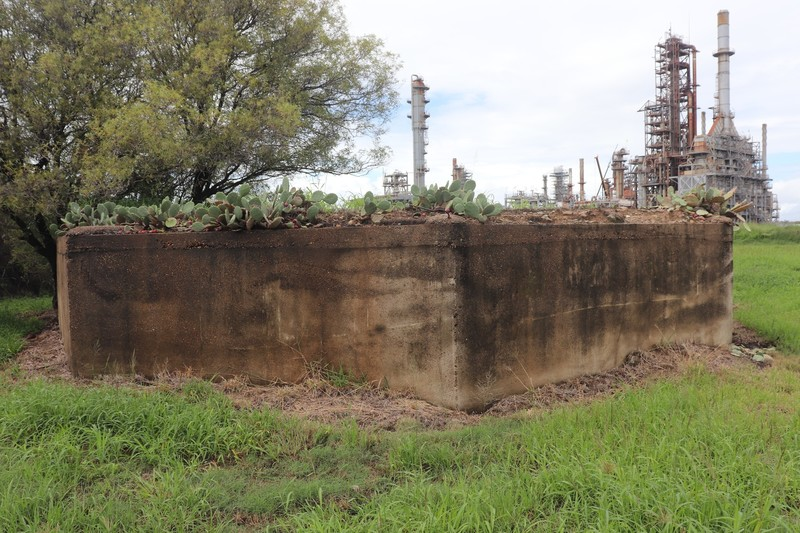
Northern gun emplacement, west side of gun pit, where earth revetment has been removed, with the refinery in the background, 2019

After the war, Brisbane's defences were dismantled. By 1963, the Lytton gun station's accommodation huts had been removed, although the gun emplacements, command post and two reserve magazines remained. That year several fuel tanks, part of a new Ampol refinery, were already under construction, to the north of the gun station. The defence reserve was not transferred from the Commonwealth to Ampol until 1964. The southwestern reserve magazine and the house which had been used as an officer's mess were removed in the 1960s; the northern reserve magazine and the earth revetment on the west side of the northernmost gun emplacement were removed in the 1970s. In 1990, Fort Lytton was declared a Historic National Park, after being relinquished by Ampol. The remaining refinery land, including the former GS 385, later became a Caltex refinery. In 1999, the National Park was extended to include part of the former quarantine station. Photographs from inside the command post, taken in 2000, show caricatures of an Australian officer and a Japanese soldier, drawn on the walls. In 2019, the grassed site of GS 385 is fenced off, within the refinery.

In 2019, of Brisbane's eight known 3.7 inch HAA gun stations, GS 385 at Lytton retains the most intact gun emplacements. GS 385 is also one of the most intact 3.7 inch gun stations in Queensland. In 2019, Townsville retains the ruins of a gun station south of the mouth of the Ross River. There is one gun emplacement at Nelly Bay on Magnetic Island. Mount St John, west of Townsville Airport, has four gun platforms, a command post and four reserve magazines (GS 393). No gun stations survive at Cairns. There are two intact gun stations on Horn Island and two at Iron Range - GS 446 and 447, north and south of Lockhart River Airport respectively. The two gun stations north and south of Mareeba Aerodrome retain a mix of buried and visible elements. The location of the two gun stations at Jacky Jacky/Higgins (now Northern Peninsula Airport) is unknown. The Hemmant Gun Emplacements (GS 390), south of Fleming Road is the next most intact with three earth-covered magazines and a command post, but only two of its four in-ground gun emplacements are visible from the air (these have in the past served as a hen house and a swimming pool, respectively. A third emplacement has been filled in and another is used as a car garage under a house. GS 387, on the treed hilltop in Balmoral Park in Morningside, and GS 386 at Victoria Park, near the southern corner of the golf course, have both been demolished, but may retain buried elements. There is no trace of GS 389, just east of Bannister Park in Hendra; GS 388, on airport land north of Pinkenba; the gun station at Heath Park in East Brisbane; or GS 385, east of the Colmslie Recreation Reserve.

GS 385 at Lytton, which retains its four gun emplacements with earth revetments, and its command post, is important surviving evidence of the anti-aircraft defences of Brisbane during WWII, and is a physical reminder of the threat posed by enemy aircraft during that conflict.

== Description ==
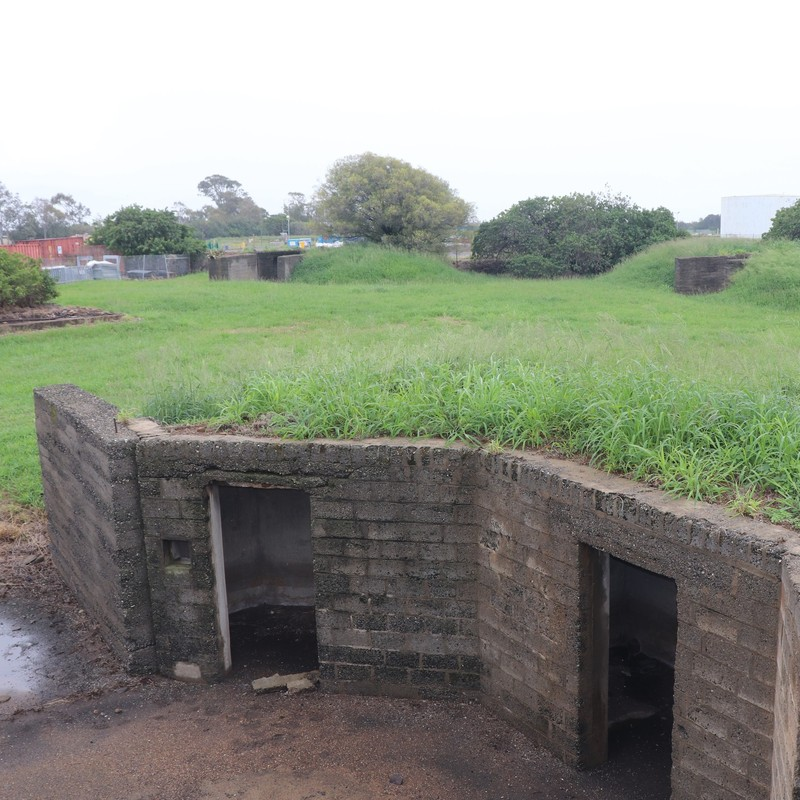
Looking from above the southeast gun emplacement's gun pit towards north, 2019

Heavy Anti-Aircraft Gun Station 385 occupies an approximately 5,180-square-metre (55,800 sq ft) rectangular site in Lytton, an industrial suburb on the southeast side of the Brisbane River mouth, approximately 14 km northeast of Brisbane's central business district (CBD). It is located on the western fringe of an oil refinery complex (c. 1963-present), and is accessed via private roads that lead into the complex from South Street. The heritage boundary is defined by coordinates aligning to a modern fence, which separates the place from the oil refinery site.

The gun emplacements are in an arc configuration, radiating from the north to the southeast of the central command post.

=== Command Post ===
The command post is a reinforced concrete structure, formerly used as a central control point that identified and calculated aircraft trajectories, and distributed signals to the gun emplacements.

The command post comprises an open pit with three connected compartments for an identification telescope at the west, rangefinder at the north, and predictor at the south. The east side of the pit steps down to an underground, concrete-roofed plotting room, which has an escape hatch protruding from its north end. The command post is entered via an open narrow passage at the southwest side of the pit.

The command post is largely over-grown by a tree at the west side of the structure, preventing access to the interior.

=== Gun Emplacements ===
The four gun emplacements are octagonal-shaped, masonry and concrete structures of a standard layout, built to house and operate 3.7 inch (94mm) static anti-aircraft guns. They are located north, northeast, east and southeast of the command post.

Each gun emplacement comprises a central unroofed gun pit, with a single entry point through an open side that faces the command post. The other seven sides feature roofed ready ammunition lockers, accessed via door openings and divided into seven rooms by concrete walls. These seven sides and the ready ammunition lockers are concealed externally by formed earth revetments (with the exception of part of the north gun emplacement, where the west side of its revetment has been removed).

While no guns remain in place, their locations in the centre of the gun pits are clearly discernible through holdfasts (which would have attached to the hexagonal base plates of the guns' static mounts).

Block screen walls at the entrances to the gun emplacements have been removed.

=== Significant views ===
The place is located in an open, cleared setting and can be read as an intact complex. Important views include those to, from and between the command post and each gun emplacement. These views facilitate the understanding of the place's historical function.

== Heritage listing ==
Heavy Anti-Aircraft Gun Station 385 was listed on the Queensland Heritage Register on 28 June 2019 having satisfied the following criteria.

The place is important in demonstrating the evolution or pattern of Queensland's history.

Heavy Anti-Aircraft Gun Station 385, Lytton (1943) is a rare, representative surviving example of the anti-aircraft defences of Queensland during World War II (WWII), and is a physical reminder of the threat posed to Brisbane's shipping and airfields by enemy aircraft. It demonstrates Brisbane's role as a major supply and naval base, aircraft assembly and headquarters location during the war in the South West Pacific, when Queensland was the main staging area for the Allied effort in New Guinea.

The place has potential to yield information that will contribute to an understanding of Queensland's history.

In its siting, planning and fabric, the intact Heavy Anti-Aircraft Gun Station 385 has the potential to contribute to a greater understanding of WWII strategic defence measures for Brisbane. Comparative analysis with the few other surviving examples, and detailed examination of the features of the site, including the command post, four gun emplacements, communications infrastructure, and submerged or sub-surface features, could reveal important information about the design, operation and site-specific modifications of 3.7 inch heavy anti-aircraft (HAA) gun stations during WWII.

The place is important in demonstrating the principal characteristics of a particular class of cultural places.

Heavy Anti-Aircraft Gun Station 385 is an excellent, intact example of an HAA gun station built in Queensland during WWII. It is important in demonstrating the principal characteristics of its type, including: its configuration in a standard layout of a central command post with a radiating arc of gun emplacements; its construction in concrete and cinder block; its command post with an underground plotting room and an open pit comprising compartments for a range-finder, identification telescope and predictor; its gun emplacements with gun pits, ready ammunition lockers, and earth revetments (including surviving earth cover on top of the gun emplacements); and its strategic location, which allowed it to engage enemy aircraft using the river to navigate toward their targets.
