= Fort Lytton National Park =

National park in Australia

- IUCN category II (national park)
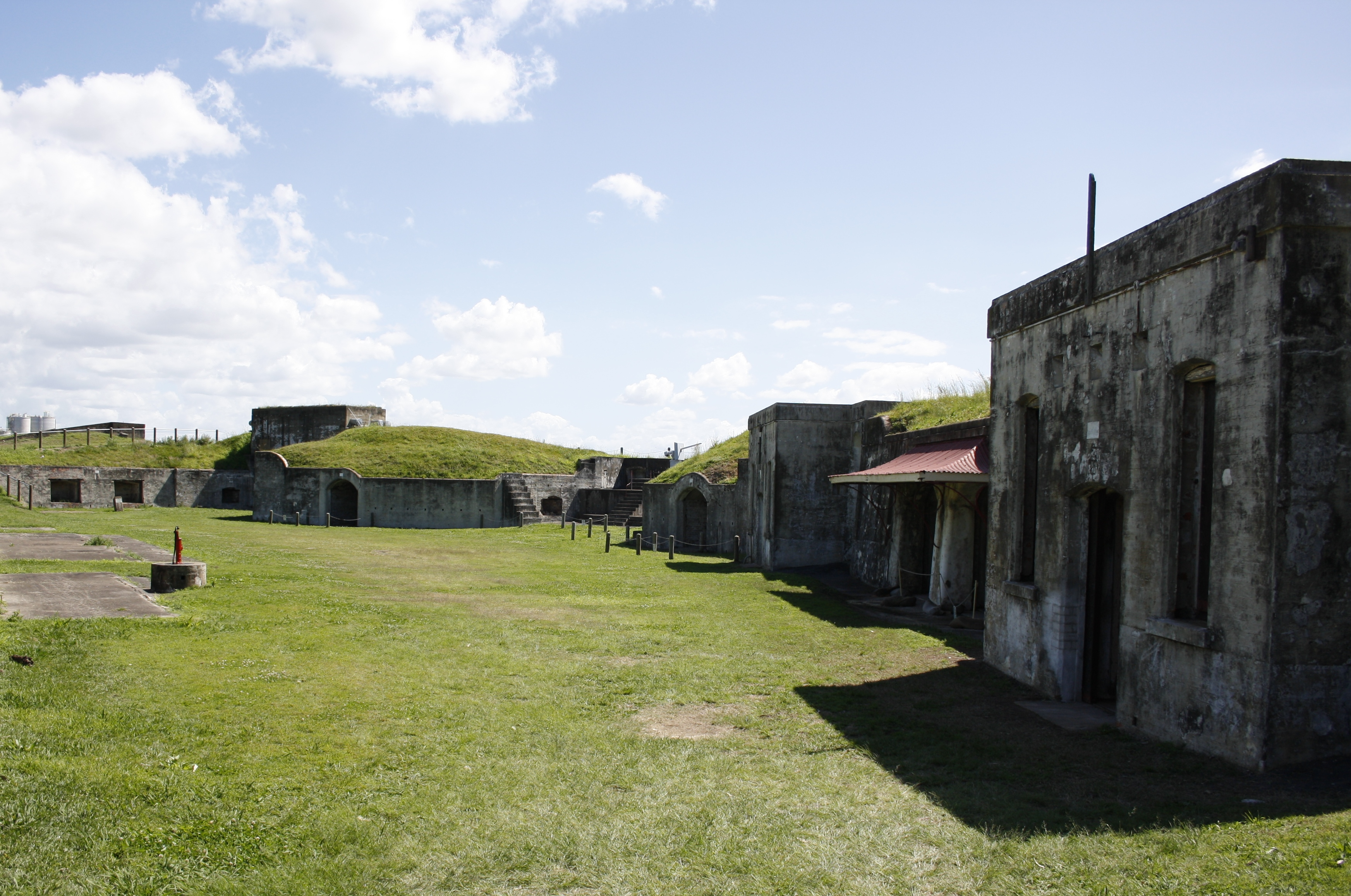
- Inside the moat of the fort.

- Location within Queensland
- Location: Queensland
- Coordinates: 27°24′44″S 153°09′00″E
- Area: 0.13 km^{2} (0.050 sq mi)
- Established: 1990
- Governing body: Queensland Parks and Wildlife Service

Fort Lytton National Park is a national park in Lytton, City of Brisbane, Queensland, Australia. Its main attraction is Fort Lytton Historic Military Precinct, providing guided tours of historic Fort Lytton, a museum and re-enactments. The park was created in 1990 as Queensland's first historic national park. It initially contained only heritage-listed Fort Lytton, a colonial coastal fort that continued to operate as a military base until after the Second World War. The park was extended in 1999 to include Lytton Quarantine Station which occupied adjacent land. The Quarantine Station is also heritage-listed, but is only open to the public on special occasions.

The park is 13 kilometres (8.1 mi) northeast of the Brisbane CBD near the mouth of the Brisbane River.

== Fort Lytton ==
Fort Lytton was constructed in 1880–1881 to protect both the city and the port from naval attack. After the Australian colonies became a federation (the Commonwealth of Australia) in 1901, the fort and the land on which it stood were transferred to the Commonwealth. Fort Lytton continued to operate as a military base until shortly after the Second World War (WW2). It was closed down progressively, the last operation to close being the signal station which closed in 1965. The land and fort were sold to the Ampol oil company in 1963, as the site for the Lytton Oil Refinery. The land contained three parcels that had particular historic significance. These were the land containing the original fort, the land containing Lytton Hill, and the land containing the remains of a WW2 heavy anti-aircraft battery. In 1988 Ampol transferred the parcel containing the original fort to the Queensland Government, and this became Fort Lytton National Park in 1990.

Fort Lytton is open free on Sundays, most public holidays and other special occasions. It features both guided and self-guided tours of the historic fort and other military structures, a military museum and regular historic re-enactments (although not every week). Access to the park at other times is by appointment only, and is subject to fees.

== Lytton Quarantine Station ==
The Lytton Quarantine Station was established in 1913–1914, to accommodate newly arrived immigrants and persons considered to be at risk of causing infection to the general population. The quarantine station was on land adjacent to Fort Lytton. By the late 1980s the quarantine station had closed completely. In 1988 management of part of the quarantine site and buildings, including the quarantine station jetty, was taken over by the Queensland Parks and Wildlife Service and was incorporated into Fort Lytton National Park in 1999. The quarantine station is only open to the public on special occasions, but visitors can always walk around the outside of the buildings. The Visitor and Information Centre (which is also the headquarters of Fort Lytton Historical Association) previously housed the quarantine station laundry.

The Quarantine Station is only open to the public on special occasions.

== Fort Lytton Military Museum ==
The museum has a collection of over 2000 items which are distributed throughout the park including in 5 buildings, 6 gun pits, 2 shelter structures and several open air locations. Admission to the museum is free, although two of the buildings (the submarine mining building and the black powder rooms) can only be accessed on guided tours.

The Old Dining Hall houses a collection of over 10,000 artefacts pertaining to Queensland's military history. Entry to the museum is free.

== Development of the national park ==
Soon after the creation of the national park in 1990, volunteers of the Royal Artillery Association of Queensland created a sub-branch to work with the Queensland Parks and Wildlife Service to develop a historic military exhibit for the public. That sub-branch became Fort Lytton Historical Association (FLHA) in 1999. FLHA is a non-profit volunteer organization which provides free guided tours of the Fort on Sundays and public holidays. It also operates the Visitor Information Centre and sells basic refreshments. FLHA seeks donations to cover its expenses.

In 2019, the Queensland Military Historical Society (formerly known as Victoria Barracks Historical Society) relocated from its former premises at Church Street, Fortitude Valley to the old Dining Hall at Fort Lytton.
