= Westbrook Reformatory for Boys =

Reformatory school in Queensland, Australia

Coordinates: 27.6171°S 151.8308°E

The Westbrook Reformatory for Boys was a reformatory school in the town of Westbrook, in the Toowoomba Region, Queensland, in Australia. The Westbrook Reformatory was created in 1900 after the closure of earlier versions of the institution on the former prison hulk, the Proserpine, and at Lytton, Queensland. The Reformatory changed its name to the Westbrook Farm Home for Boys in 1919. Under this later name, it was the subject of a major scandal which culminated in a government inquiry. The institution was renamed twice more before its closure in 1994. Since its closure, the Westbrook institution has become known as a site of serious institutional abuse. It was described at length in the 1999 Forde Inquiry and the 2004 Forgotten Australians report.

The reformatory was located on the Toowoomba Athol Road (to the north), between the Westbrook Wyreema Road (to the West) and Althaus Road (to the east).

== Early history ==
The Industrial and Reformatory Schools Act of 1865 was the first legislation created to allow youth justice institutions to be created in the colony of Queensland. The Act, which was based on the English Poor Laws, provided for two distinct forms of institution: reformatory schools, for children convicted of offences, and industrial schools, for children found to be neglected. The first institution created in Queensland under this legislation was the reformatory for boys on the former prison hulk, the Proserpine, in 1871. The institution was moored on the Brisbane River.

In February 1881, in part due to problems with the poor upkeep of the ship, the institution was moved to dry land at Signal Hill at Lytton, Queensland. Here, the institution shared space with the Queensland Defence Force. Historian Alan Savige writes that "[t]he boys were located in the middle of a military defensive position that could not hide the fact that it served a double purpose in restraining them while they were on dry land and provided easy surveillance of the Brisbane River mouth and the southern section of Moreton Bay." He describes the situation as similar to the famous Mettray Penal Colony in France, where the architecture made the purpose of the institution clear.

In 1889, after tensions arose between the military staff and the institution, the reformatory was moved temporarily to the site of the Diamantina Orphanage, named for Diamantina Bowen while new facilities were built at Westbrook. The institution at Westbrook was opened on 5 May 1900.

== The Westbrook Reformatory for Boys ==
Between 5 May 1900 and 30 October 1919, the institution was known as the Westbrook Reformatory for Boys. Despite the name "reformatory," the institution held both boys convicted of criminal offences and those found to be neglected. This was a continuation of practices established as early as 1871, when the Proserpine was designated a reformatory without the government creating any industrial schools. As a result, between 1871 and 1900, around half of the boys sentenced to the institution were committed as "neglected," while most boys who had been sentenced as offenders were recorded as having committed minor offences such as larceny. At Westbrook, boys underwent a system of training for "moral reformation" which included formal education, agricultural labour, and apprenticeships through a system known as "hiring out."

In 1916, public concern began to increase about the conditions of the children in the reformatory, with the Home Secretary, the government official ultimately responsible for the institution, stating after a visit that "Westbrook is called a reformatory, but there is as much chance of reforming the inmates under existing conditions as there is of my developing wings." In response to these concerns, then-Superintendent, Walter Richmond, was replaced with Thomas Jones, former head of a state experimental farm. Under Jones, the institution further emphasised farming.

== Westbrook Farm Home for Boys ==
From 1919 to 1966, the institution was known as the Westbrook Farm Home for Boys. This change of name was the result of Thomas Jones's insistence that a new name be created which better fit the agricultural ethos of the institution. Under this name, the institution became known for its excellence in agricultural outputs, including prize-winning entries in local and state-level agricultural contests. During the 1950s and 1960s, under the leadership of Superintendent Roy Golledge, the Farm Home was the site of considerable mistreatment and abuse. It was identified in the report of the 1999 Forde Inquiry as having had one of the worst cultures of abuse of any Queensland institutions for children.

=== The mass escape of 1961 and the Schwarten inquiry ===
One of the most significant events in the institution's history was the mass escape of 1961. On 14 May 1961, a boy lit a haystack on fire. This was a prearranged signal for inmates to escape. The number of escapees has never been satisfactorily determined. Early newspaper reports suggested that as many as 30 inmates may have attempted to escape. However, an inquiry into the event put the number as 18. Part of the reason that determining the number of escapees is impossible is a system the institution had in place whereby boys were encouraged to "catch" others who escaped. The mass escape led to increased public concern about the institution, which had become the subject of allegations of abuse and mistreatment. As a direct result, stipendiary magistrate Alfred Edward Schwarten was asked to conduct an inquiry into the institution.

The Schwarten inquiry identified significant mistreatment and abuse, including improper and severe punishments. One of the most abusive was known as "the Path." Former inmate Al Fletcher describes the punishment as follows:

The Path must have been Golledge's idea. It would be hard to think of anything more cruel.

It consisted of six parallel tracks, each twenty metres long and about two metres apart. There was a post at both ends of each track. You had to walk up and down between those posts all your spare time. You still had to do your day's work, but when others knocked off, you went on the Path.

You had to keep walking' quick. If you slowed down, they'd put a sergeant at each end to give you a smack in the head until you went quick enough for their liking'. If they went to the trouble of sending' a couple of sergeants down, you got quite a few smacks, no matter how fast you went.

As a result of the findings of the Schwarten report, Golledge was removed from his position as superintendent. The institution underwent considerable change, including the development of a secure unit for absconders and a change of name, to the Westbrook Training Centre.

== Westbrook Training Centre ==
From 26 May 1967 to 1987, the institution was known as the Westbrook Training Centre. The institution continued to emphasise training for farm work and agricultural careers. Despite the changes made after the Schwarten inquiry, former inmates have reported receiving significant and harsh punishment during this period. There is also evidence of problems caused by overcrowding. In 1971, an inquiry was undertaken into allegations of mistreatment during this period. While the inquiry found that many of the public allegations, including allegations of poor food quality and homosexual relations between the boys, were not substantiated, it did condemn practices such as slapping inmates for misbehaviour.

== Westbrook Youth Centre ==
From 1987 to 1993, the institution was known as the Westbrook Youth Centre. This was a period of instability, caused in part by increased concern about the isolated geographical location of the institution.

== Westbrook Youth Detention Centre ==
From 1993 to its closure on 30 June 1994, the institution was known as the Westbrook Youth Detention Centre. Concerns about the location and safety of the institution came to a head in March 1994, when a serious incident occurred. Young people incarcerated in the institution caused damage to the institution's buildings in an act of protest which, according to a report tabled in parliament, could not be resolved quickly due to the remote location of the institution. This hastened the decision, which had already been made, to close the institution.

== Current use ==
As at 2021, part of the site is used for the Royal Brisbane Institute of Technology and the Royal Brisbane International College.
