= HMAS Kinchela =

Auxiliary ship of the Royal Australian Navy

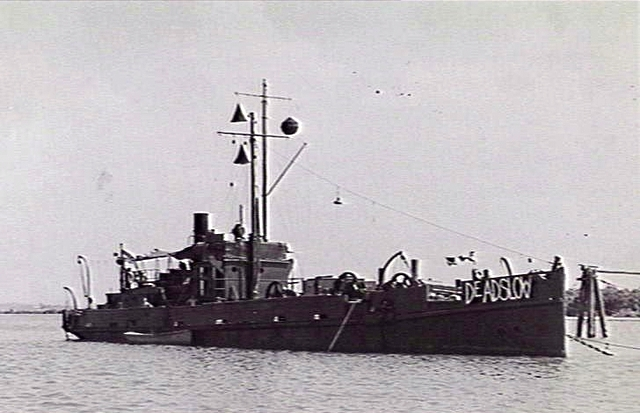
- HMAS Kinchela on the Brisbane River in 1944

History

Australia
- Name: Tamban (1914–1915); Kinchela (1915–??)
- Owner: Macleay River Co-operative Steamship Company (1914–1922); North Coast Steam Navigation Company (1922–1936)
- Builder: Morrison & Sinclair, Balmain
- Launched: 1914
- Completed: 1915

History

Australia
- Name: HMAS Kinchela
- Acquired: 28 August 1942
- Fate: Sold in July 1946

General characteristics
- Tonnage: 369 GRT – Cargo vessel; 209 GRT – Boom vessel; 111 GRT – Lighter
- Length: 145 feet (44 m)
- Beam: 31 feet (9.4 m)
- Draught: 11 feet (3.4 m)
- Installed power: Two compound engines built by Mort's Dock & Engineering Company, Balmain
- Propulsion: Twin screw
- Speed: 10 knots (max)

HMAS Kinchela (Z96) was an auxiliary boom gate vessel of the Royal Australian Navy (RAN). She was built in 1914 as a cargo vessel for the Macleay River Co-operative Steamship Company.

Built by Morrison & Sinclair, Balmain, as Tamban, for the Macleay River Co-operative Steamship Company, she was launched in 1914. Her compound engines were installed by Wildridge a Sinclair, Balmain. She was operated on the Milsons Point run. She was renamed Kinchela in October 1915. She collided with a lighter at Darling Harbour on 25 June 1918.

She was sold in 1922 to the North Coast Steam Navigation Company. She collided with Newcastle in Newcastle Harbour on 22 August 1922. She ran aground on the spit at Port Macquarie, New South Wales in March 1933. She was hulked in 1936 and her machinery was removed. Part of her machinery was fitted in Nambucca. Her hull was requisitioned by the RAN on 28 August 1942 and she was converted into an auxiliary boom gate vessel for use in the Brisbane River at Fort Lytton. She was paid off for disposal in 1945 and while being towed to Sydney she almost sank. She was sold in July 1946.
