= Fort Lytton =

19th-century fort in Brisbane, Australia

Coordinates: 27.4104°S 153.1514°E

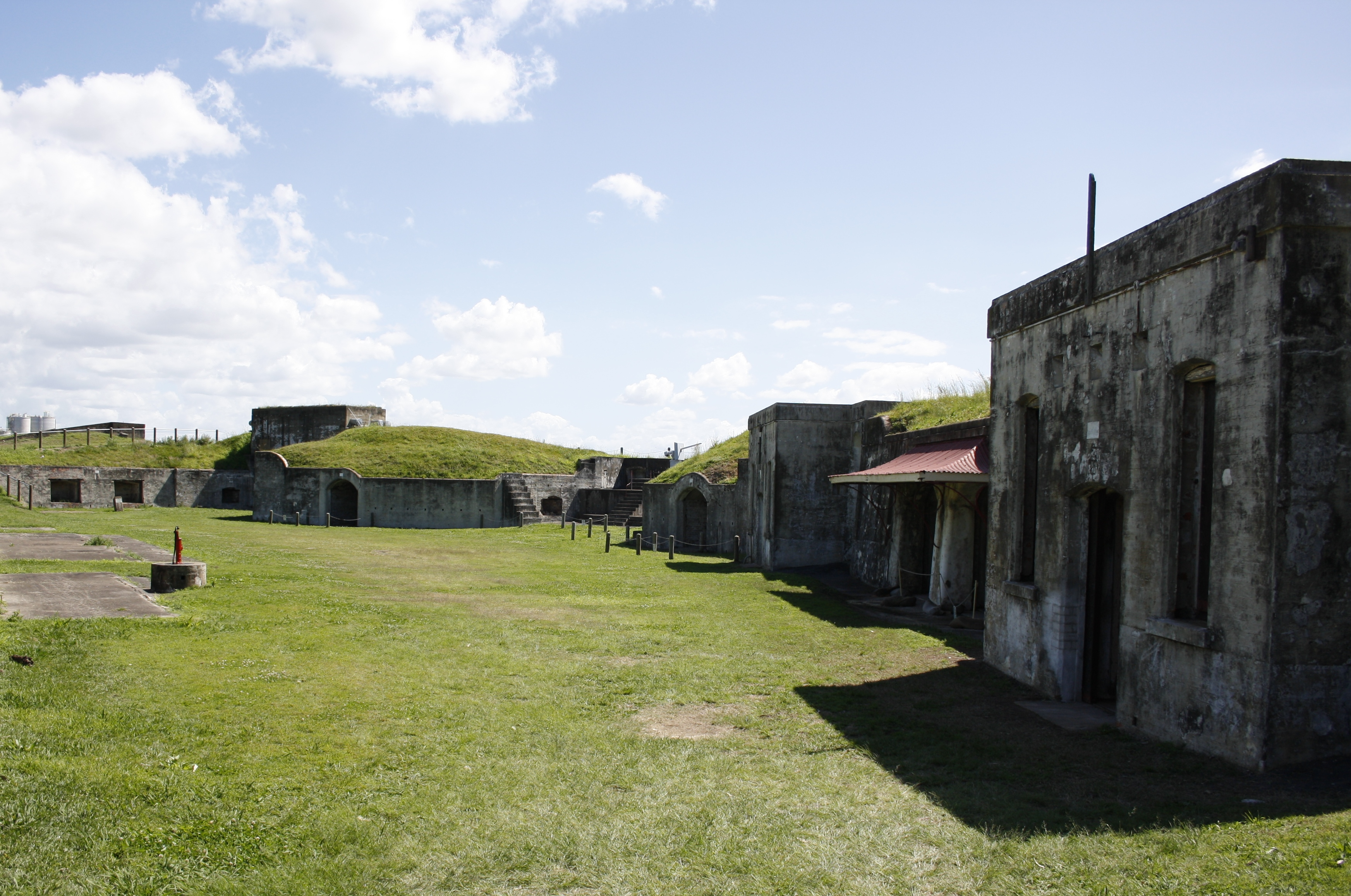
The fort consists of almost a hectare of buildings, gunpits, tunnels and other structures embedded in a pentagonal earth mound wall, surrounded by a water-filled moat.

Fort Lytton is a heritage-listed 19th-century coastal fort in the suburb of Lytton in Brisbane, Queensland, Australia. The name “Fort Lytton” is also used to describe the 1 square mile (2.6 km^{2}) military base that surrounded the fort. Fort Lytton was built in 1880–1882, and operated until 1965. The historic fort is now contained in Fort Lytton National Park. The park is open to the public on most Sundays and public holidays. Guided tours are provided by Fort Lytton Historical Association, a non-profit volunteer organisation.

== Colonial Era ==
Fort Lytton was built in 1880–1882 in response to a fear that a foreign colonial power such as Russia or France might launch a naval attack on Brisbane or its port, both of which were located along the banks of the Brisbane River. The fort was designed by Lieutenant-Colonel Peter Scratchley. It was located at the mouth of the Brisbane river, and was designed to deny enemy vessels access to the river. This was initially achieved by a remote-controlled minefield across the mouth of the river, and four muzzle-loading heavy guns (two 80pdrs and two 64pdrs). By 1888, the 80pdr guns were replaced with two 6-inch (150 mm) 100pdr breech-loading disappearing guns. Five years after that, the defences were increased with the addition of two quick-firing Hotchkiss 6pdr guns. The minefield was closed in 1908, but the disappearing guns continued in operation until 1938.

Throughout its life, Fort Lytton was a major training base. Thousands of soldiers trained at Fort Lytton for the Boer War, World War I and World War II. For its first forty years the fort was also the main training base for Queensland's reserve soldiers. Each year up to 5000 reservists attended training at Fort Lytton's "Easter Encampment".

The Australian colonies were part of the British Empire, but other colonial powers were rapidly expanding their empires. At the time the fort was built, Brisbane had fewer than 100,000 people, with an annual trade worth more than four million pounds. Brisbane was more vulnerable to naval attack than Sydney or Melbourne as it was just three days' sail from the French naval garrison at Nouméa. Local defences were essential as Moreton Bay had numerous island on which the enemy could establish a base. Based on the recommendations of the illustrious British soldiers and military tacticians Colonel Sir William Jervois and Scratchley, Queensland opted to rely heavily on Fort Lytton as a fixed defence position for its capital and wealthiest port, Brisbane.

The fort is a typical nineteenth century garrison - a pentagonal fortress concealed behind grassy embankments - surrounded for greater protection by a water-filled moat. Approval for construction of the fort at Lytton was given by the Parliament of Queensland in 1878. A field force of field artillery, engineers and infantry was also established to defend against a land attack by enemy forces. The government did not favour cavalry, as mounted soldiers could be recruited from the police force in an emergency . A small marine defence force was also developed, consisting of the two gunboats Gayundah and Paluma, the torpedo boat Mosquito and a number of armed barges.

== Lytton Hill ==
Lytton Hill was the only significant hill in the one square mile Fort Lytton complex, giving it enormous defensive significance. It is located about 0.75 miles (1.21 km) east of the colonial fort. In the mid-1880s a redoubt (mini-fort) was constructed on the hill to serve as a lookout and as a base for the infantry and field artillery units that were needed to protect Fort Lytton from an attack by land. The redoubt was connected to Fort Lytton by telegraph, no doubt backed up by more traditional signalling means such as semaphore. Lytton Hill was able to observe and report ship movements in Moreton Bay, and land movements of attacking forces. In the Second World War, Lytton Hill accommodated an army signals station and a Royal Australian Airforce radar station. At various times Lytton Hill was also used for civilian applications such as for semaphore communications with the prison located on St Helena Island, to temporarily accommodate a boys reformatory school, and as a radar station for the Brisbane Pilot Service.

== Boer War ==
The Second Boer War was fought in Southern Africa between 1899 and 1902. In total over 3000 Queensland officers and men were sent to help the British forces to fight the war, most being mounted troops from the Queensland Mounted Infantry, the Queensland Imperial Bushmen and the Australian Commonwealth Horse. Nine contingents sailed from Brisbane between November 1899 and May 1902. Most (and probably all) contingents mustered and trained at Fort Lytton prior to embarkation.

== First World War ==
During the First World War, Fort Lytton was mainly a training facility for troops preparing to go overseas. Also, Fort Lytton had its own wharf where numerous troops embarked. The Fort's artillery was used operationally on two occasions, firing warning shots near two ships (a Dutch steamer and a local fishing vessel) that were failing to follow wartime procedures. Immediately following the war, the Fort was used as an extension of the adjacent quarantine station by accommodating quarantined returning soldiers in tents.

== Second World War ==
Fort Lytton's role in the Second World War was very different from previous times. It was now part of a much larger defence system. Between 1937 and 1943, four more coastal forts were built to defend Moreton Bay. These forts provided the outer defence to prevent enemy vessels from reaching the mouth of the Brisbane River, while Fort Lytton provided the inner defence. The four outer forts were Fort Bribie and Fort Skirmish on Bribie Island, and Fort Cowan Cowan and Fort Rous on Moreton Island. Each of these forts was equipped with two six inch guns, giving combined coverage of most of Moreton Bay. Also, the navy operated indicator loops and remote-controlled minefields in the deep water channels of Moreton Bay, giving them the potential to detect and destroy enemy vessels including submerged submarines.

One of Fort Lytton's roles was "Inner Inspection Station". This meant that it could send out inspection parties to board and inspect ships to insure it was safe to allow them to proceed up the river. A ship (HMAS Kinchela) was permanently anchored near the middle of the river off Fort Lytton. Two permanent heavy steel boom nets blocked the river permanently on the far side of Kinchela. Two movable steel boom net gates blocked the river between Kinchela and the fort, and were opened and closed by a large winches mounted at Fort Lytton and on Kinchela. Search lights illuminated the net when required. Warning of vessels approaching the boom was provided by indicator loop and photo-electric beam systems across the river mouth downstream of the fort. Guns at fort were used in protect the boom gate. These included a 4.7-inch (120 mm) naval gun and a twin 6-pounder rapid-fire gun which was remotely controlled from a 15-metre (49 ft) high lookout tower.

Many other defence activities were based at Fort Lytton including a signals station, a radar station and a heavy anti-aircraft battery. Brisbane's defences were progressively strengthened during WW2, in line with Brisbane's increasing strategic significance to the war effort. In particular, by 1943, Brisbane was a major submarine base. A total of 89 submarines were dry docked for repairs in Brisbane over a three-year period.

== Korean War ==
Over 17,000 Australians served in the Korean War between 1950 and 1953. Fort Lytton's signal station provided essential communications between Australian and its forces in Korea. The signal station was significantly upgraded at this stage, including upgrades to radio equipment, masts and aerials (antennas).

== After the war ==
Fort Lytton began closing down as soon as the Second World War ended. However, the signal station remained operational until late 1965. The fort's last significant defence operation was in October 1965 when the signals station was used to gather intelligence on the "Indonesian coup" which resulted in rise to power of General Suharto who would later be appointed as president. Shortly after this incident, the Fort Lytton site was handed over to the Ampol oil company to build the Lytton Oil Refinery. Whilst most of the site was transformed into oil refining and storage facilities, three parcels of land were left intact. They were the site of the colonial fort and its associated structures, Lytton Hill and its associated structures, and the site of the heavy anti-aircraft battery, containing four protected gun pits and a command post. The oil company transferred the site of the colonial fort and its associated structures to the Queensland Government in 1988, and this became Fort Lytton National Park in 1990. Lytton Hill and the heavy anti-aircraft battery remain inside the refinery.

== Gallery ==
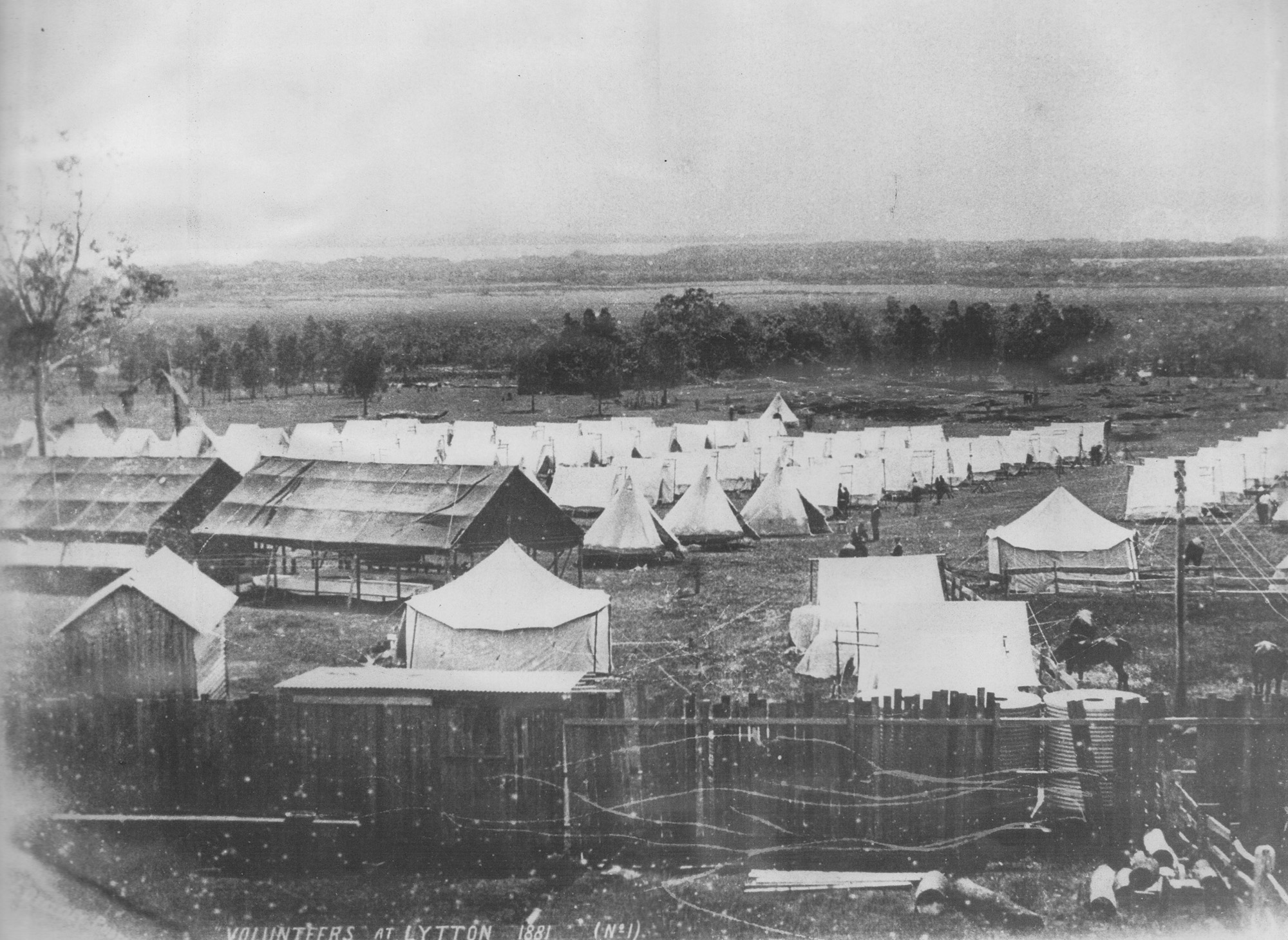
Eastern training encampment, 1881 (Note: The first of about forty annual Easter training encampments at Fort Lytton. 1881. Taken from Lytton Hill facing roughly north. (Fort Lytton Military Museum).)

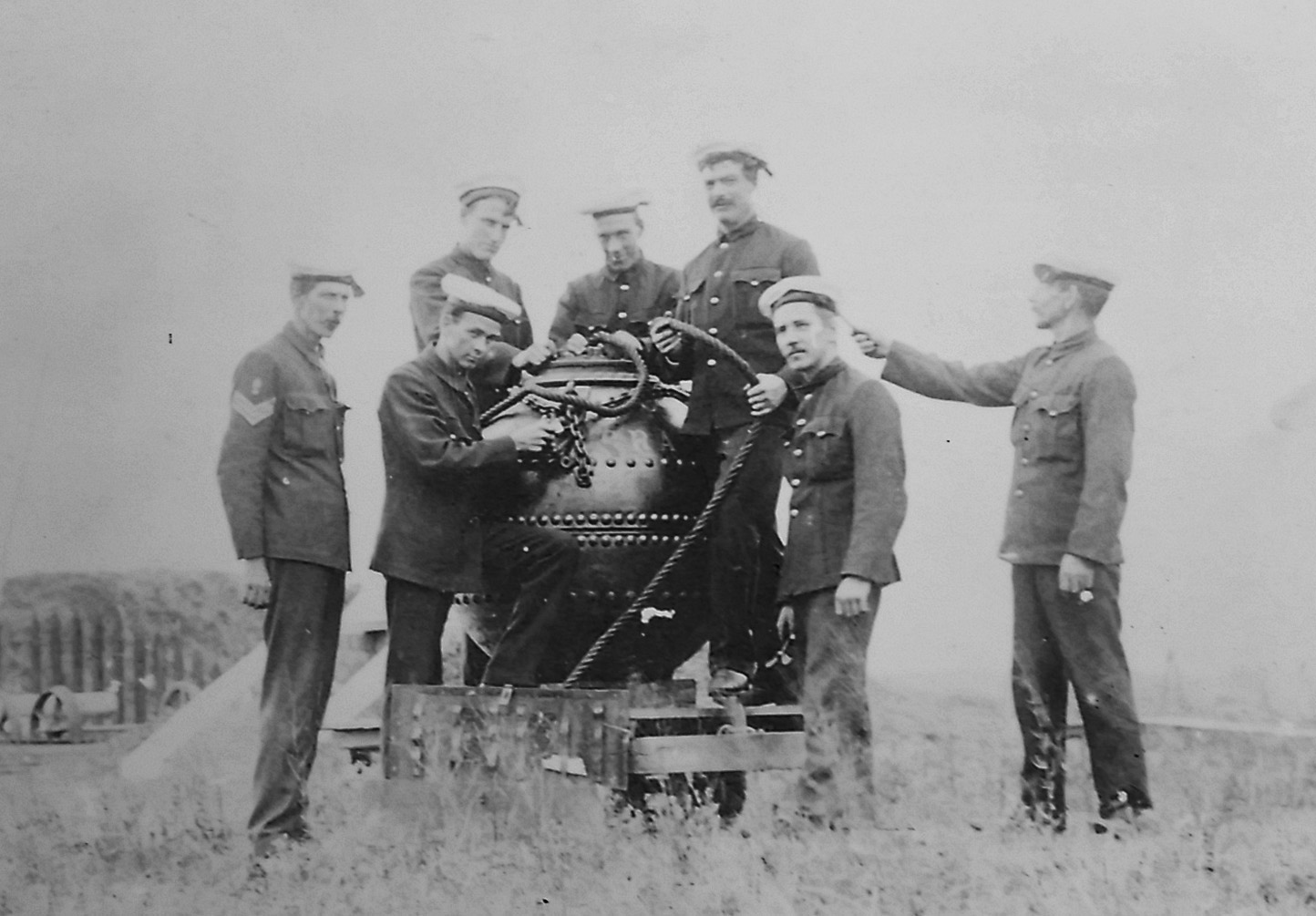
Submarine mining engineers with submarine mine c.1890 (Note: Submarine mining engineers at Fort Lytton with submarine mine c.1890. (Fort Lytton Military Museum).)

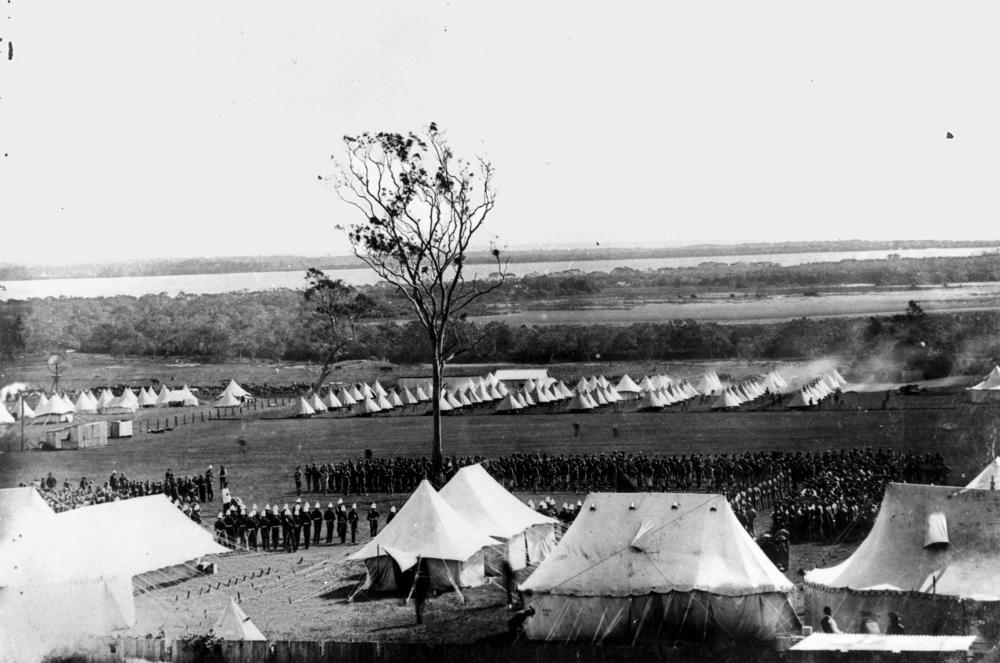
Encampment, c.1895 (Note: Encampment at Fort Lytton. Taken from Lytton Hill facing roughly north west. Training encampments could be large, sometimes up to nearly 5000 people. c.1895. (State Library of Queensland 1 44011))

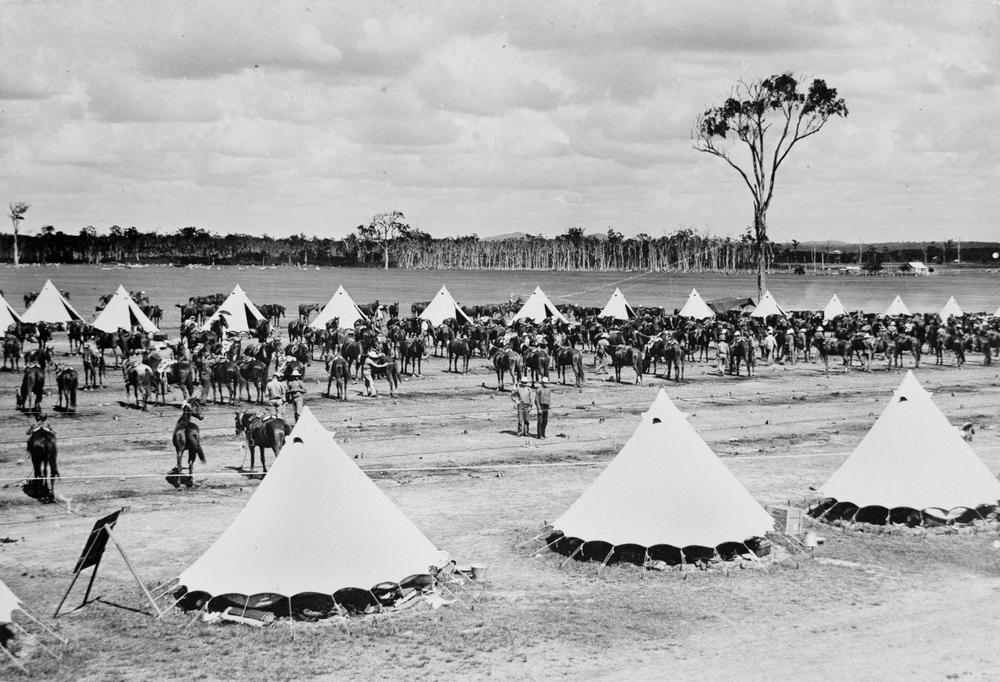
Encampment of soldiers and horses, c.1899 (possibly a Boer War contingent) (Note: Encampment of soldiers and their horses at Fort Lytton c1899. This is probably one of the early Boer War contingents (State Library of Queensland 1 182827).)

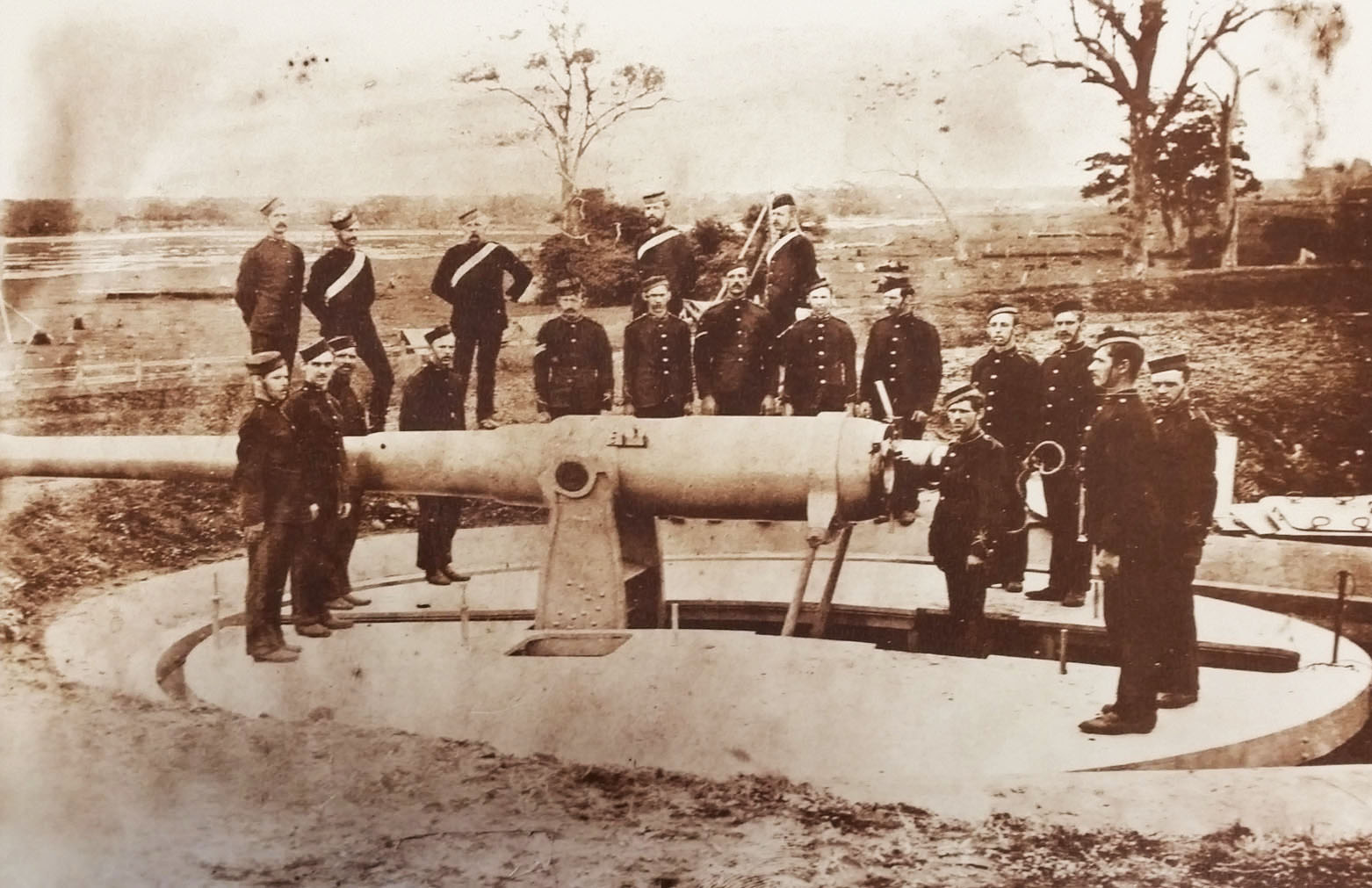
Armstrong 6 inches (150 mm) 100pdr Breech Loading Disappearing Gun in Firing Position, c1900 (Note: Armstrong 6inch 100pdr Breech Loading Disappearing Gun in Firing Position at Fort Lytton. c1900. (Fort Lytton Military Museum).)

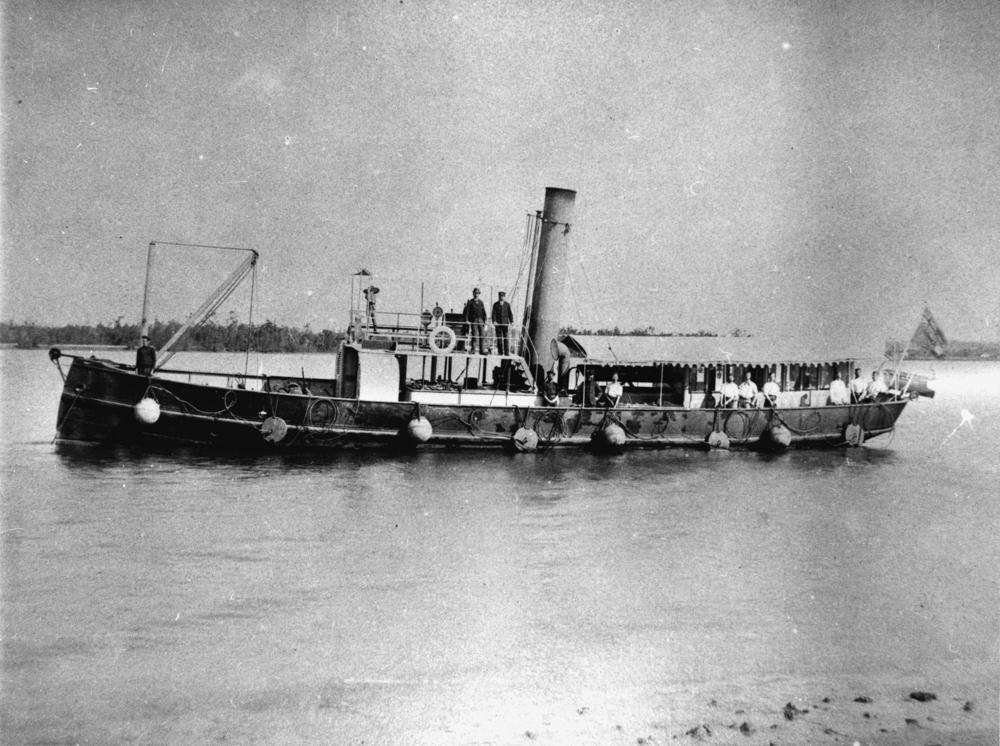
Submarine minefield service vessel "Miner" with spherical mines and connecting cables hanging over side (Note: Submarine minefield service vessel "Miner" with spherical mines and connecting cables hanging over side. (State Library of Queensland 1 110176).)

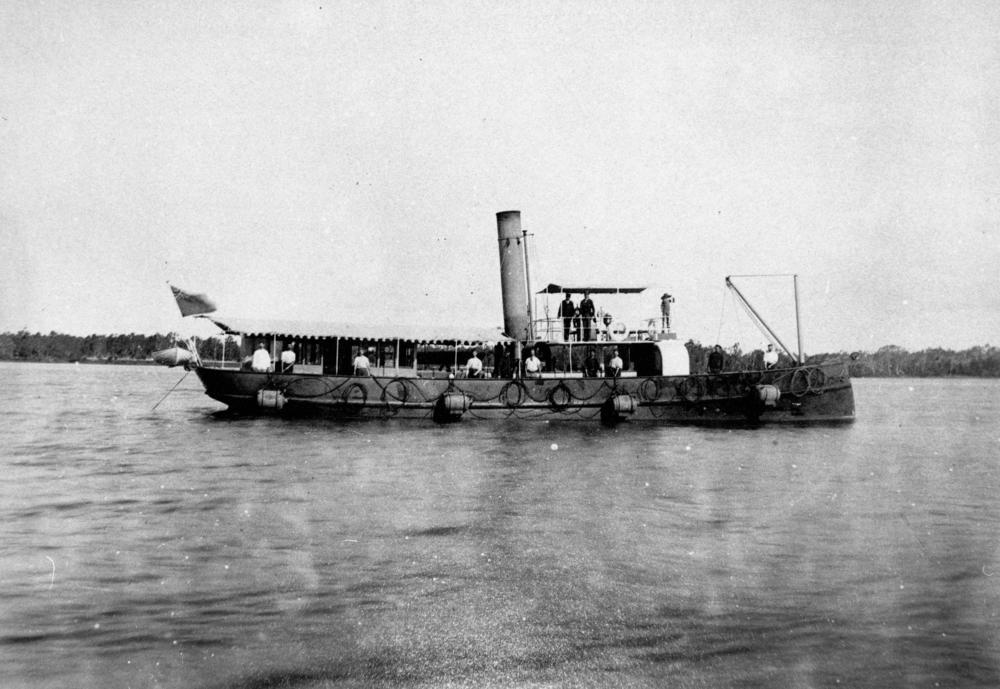
Submarine minefield service vessel "Miner" with cylindrical mines and connecting cables hanging over side. (Note: Submarine minefield service vessel "Miner" with cylindrical mines and connecting cables hanging over side. (State Library of Queensland 1 114472).)

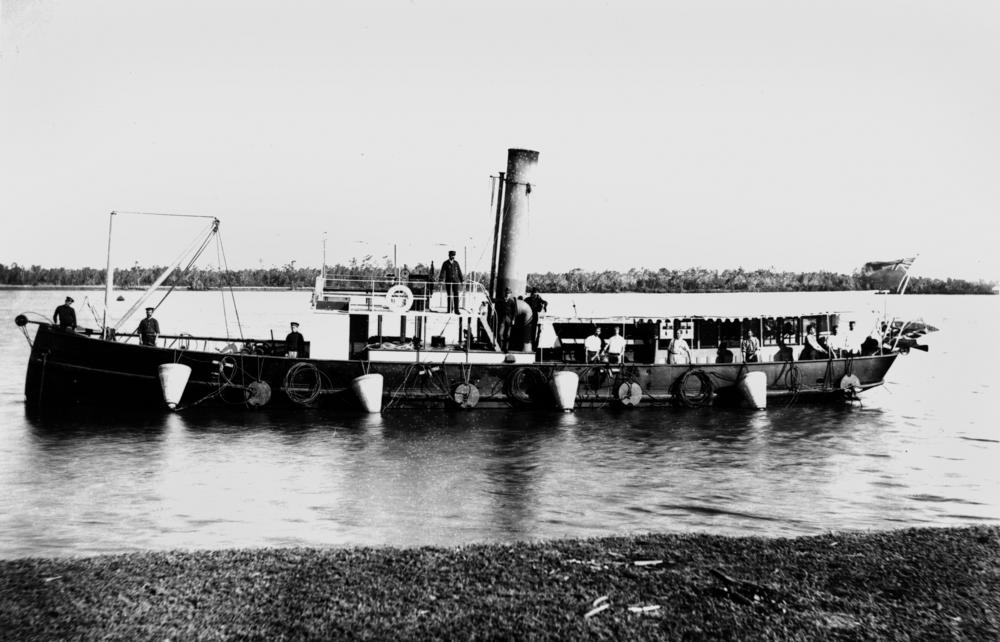
Submarine minefield service vessel "Miner" with conical mines and connecting cables hanging over side (Note: Submarine minefield service vessel "Miner" with conical mines and connecting cables hanging over side. (State Library of Queensland 1 158982).)

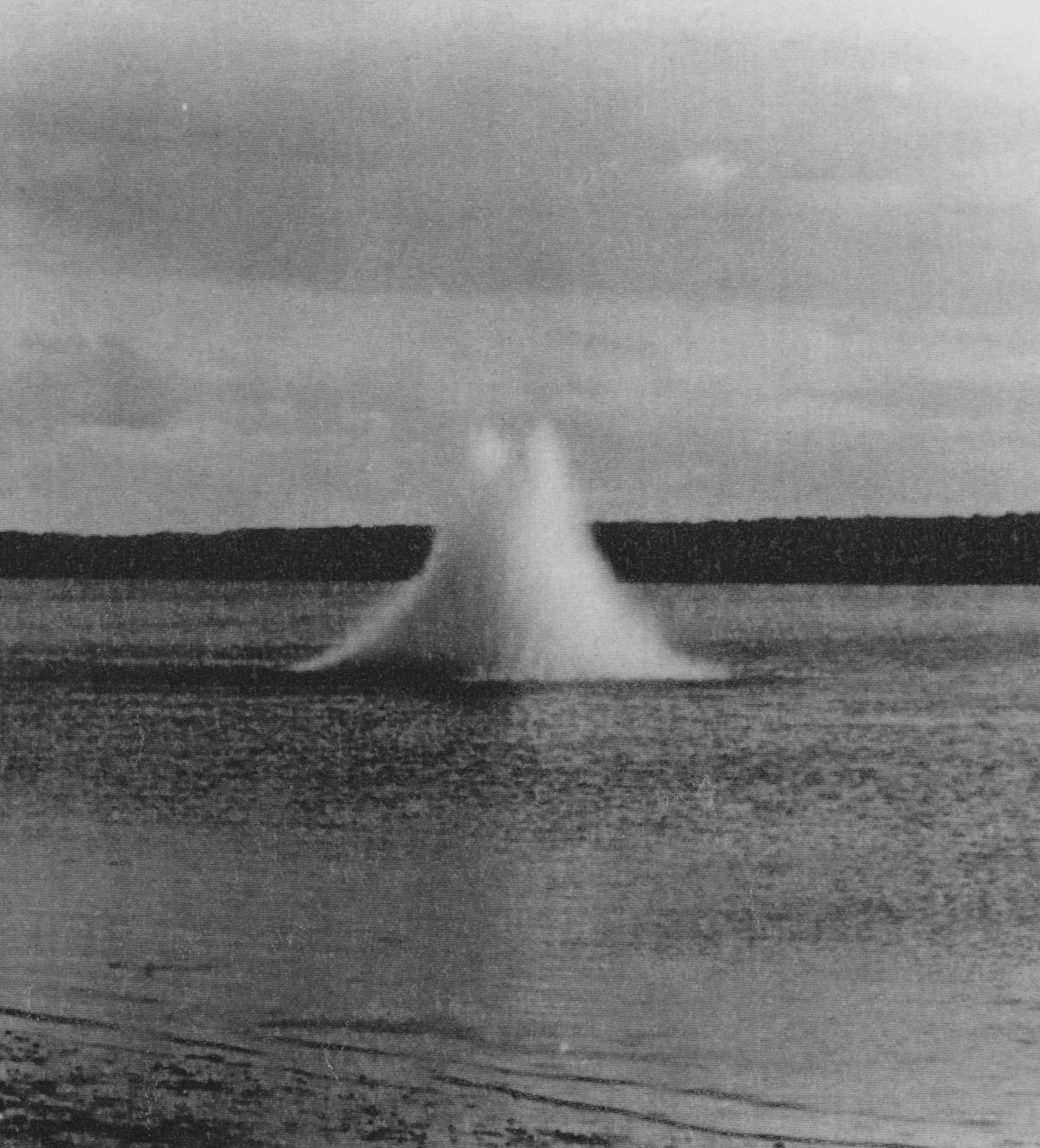
The last submarine mine being exploded at Fort Lytton on closure of the submarine minefield 1908 (Note: The last submarine mine being exploded at Fort Lytton on closure of the submarine minefield 1908. (Fort Lytton Military Museum).)

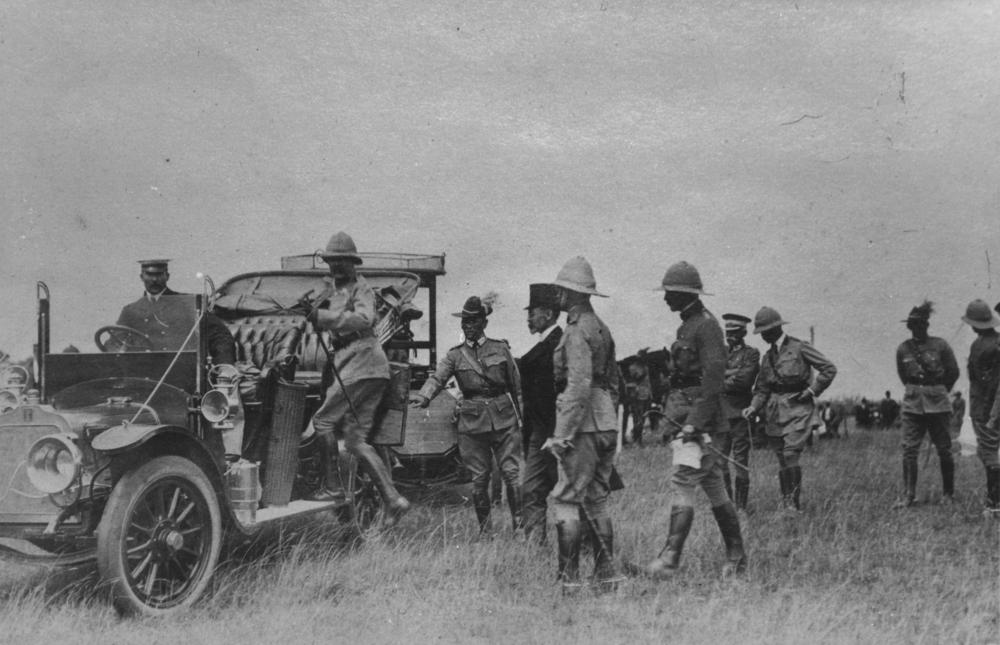
Lord Kitchener visiting Fort Lytton, 1910 (Note: Lord Kitchener visiting Fort Lytton. 1910. (State Library of Queensland 2 239977))

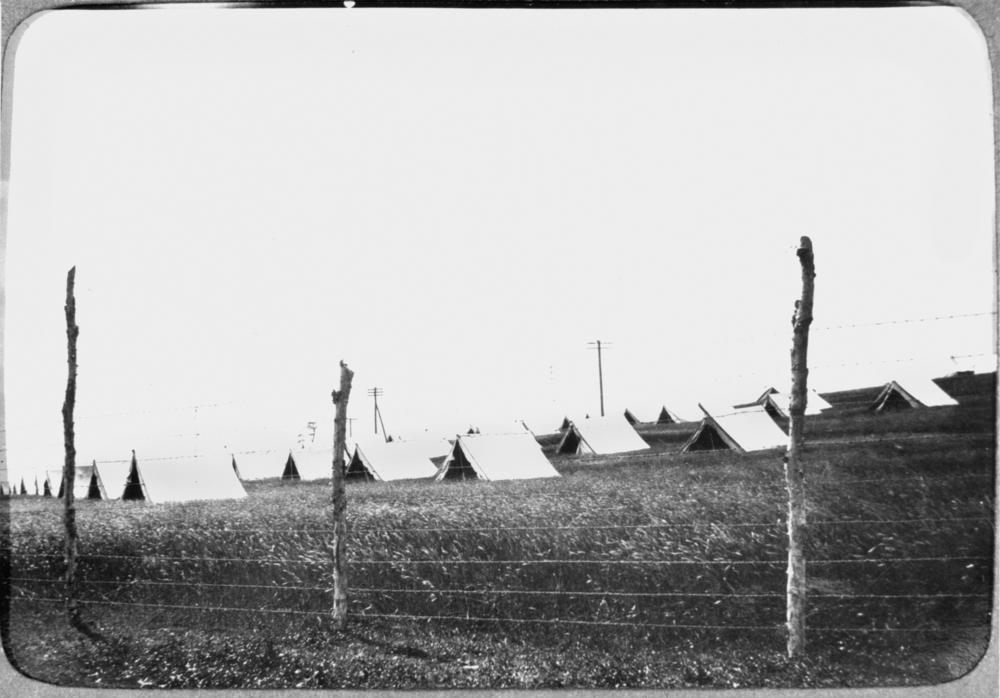
A tent quarantine camp at Fort Lytton in 1919 (Note: A tent quarantine camp at Fort Lytton in 1919. (State Library of Queensland 1 129895))

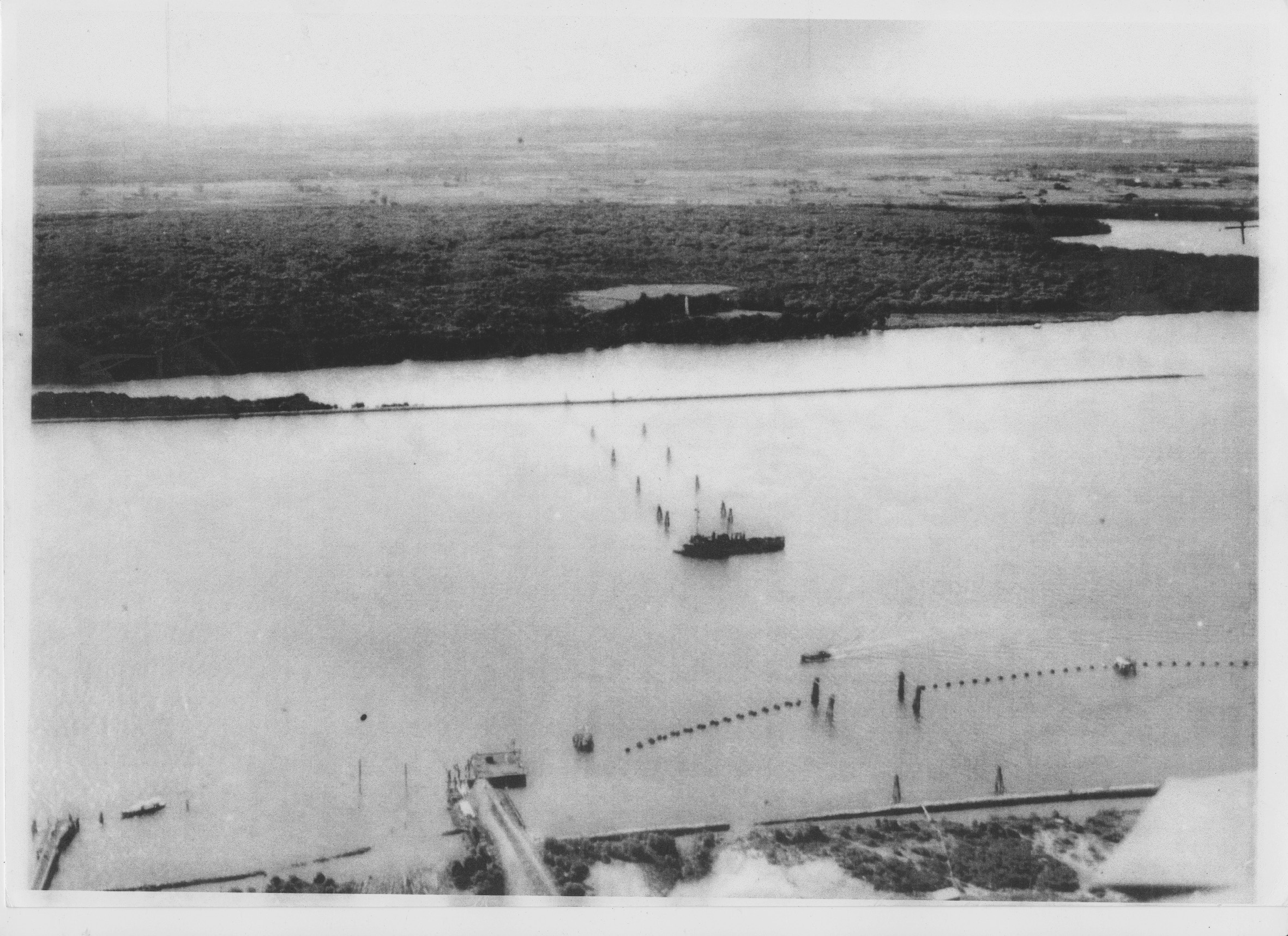
Anti-submarine boom (net) at Fort Lytton during the Second World War. Two moving boom gates were operated by winches located at the fort and on the permanently anchored ship. (Note: Anti-submarine boom (net) at Fort Lytton during the Second World War. Two moving boom gates were operated by winches located at the fort and on the permanently anchored ship. (Fort Lytton Military Museum).)

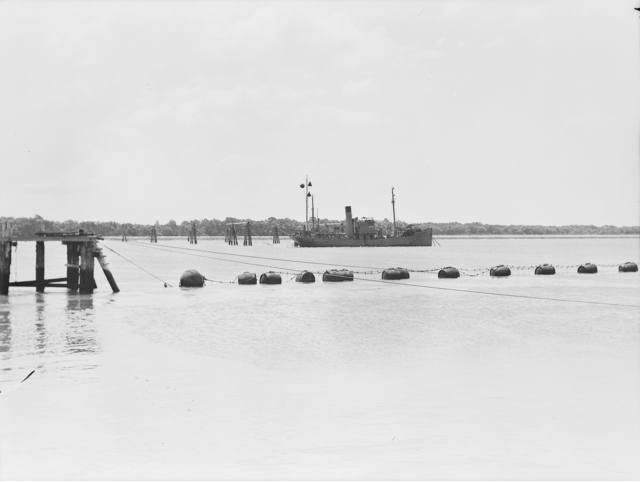
Anti-submarine boom gate in open position (foreground) and permanently anchored ship "HMAS Kinchela" (background). 1943. (Note: Anti-submarine boom gate in open position (foreground) and permanently anchored ship "HMAS Kinchela" (background). 1943. (Australian War Memorial 060053).)

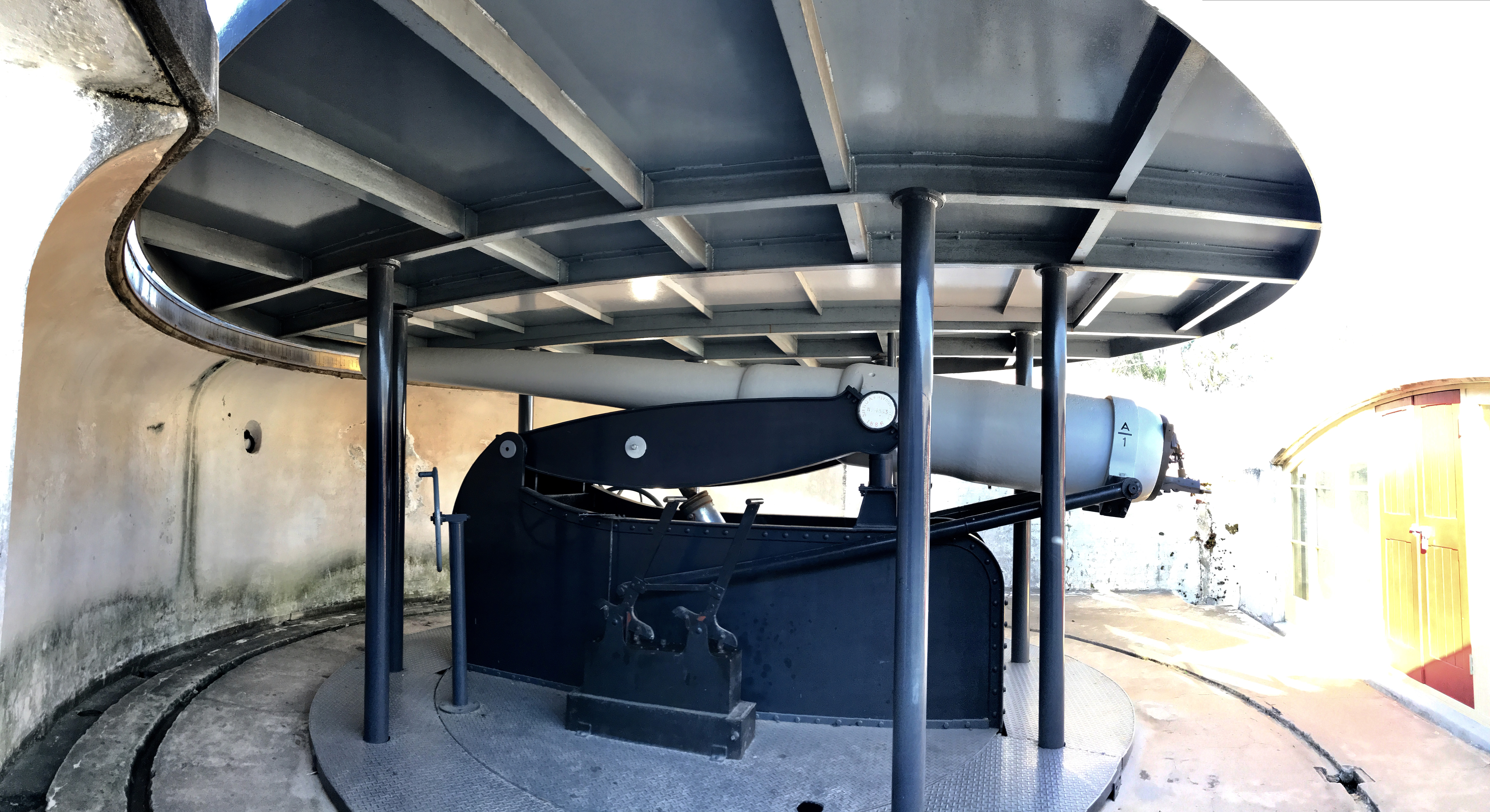
6-inch Armstrong disappearing gun at Fort Lytton, Brisbane. (Note: 6-inch Armstrong disappearing gun at Fort Lytton, Brisbane.)

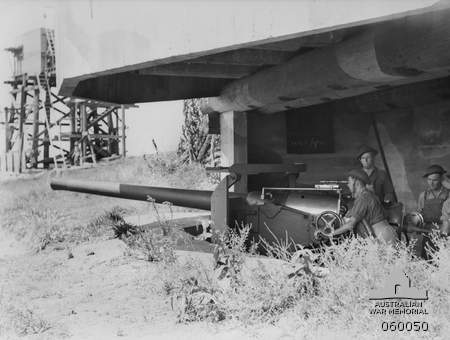
4.7-inch (120 mm) gun protecting the anti-submarine boom at Fort Lytton, 1943 (Note: 4.7-inch gun protecting the anti-submarine boom at Fort Lytton, 1943 (Australian War Memorial 060050))

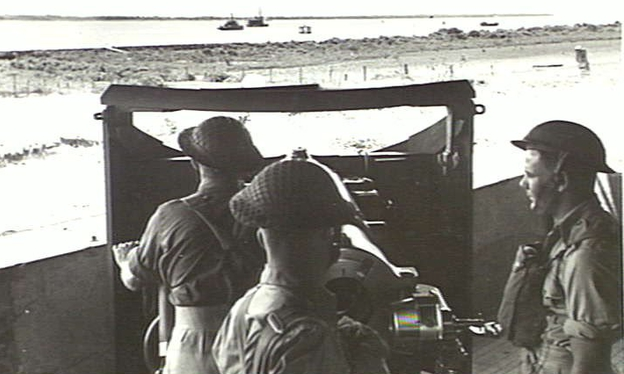
Gunners at 4.7-inch (120 mm) gun watching vessels at river mouth. 1943. (Note: Gunners at 4.7-inch gun watching vessels at river mouth. 1943. (Australian War Memorial 060051).)

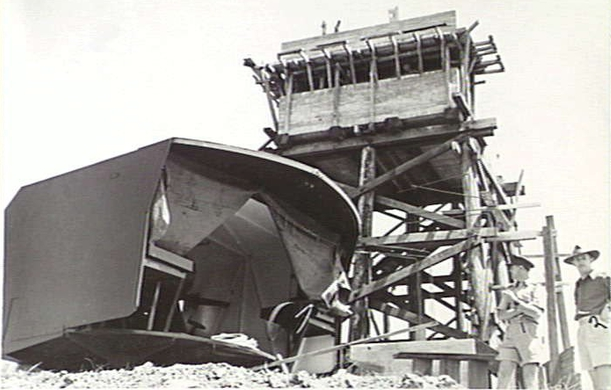
Twin-6pdr gun providing anti-motor-torpedo-boat defence at Fort Lytton 1943 (protected mount – foreground, command tower (background) (Note: Twin-6pdr gun providing anti-motor-torpedo-boat defence at Fort Lytton 1943 (protected mount - foreground, command tower (background). (Australian War Memorial 060047))

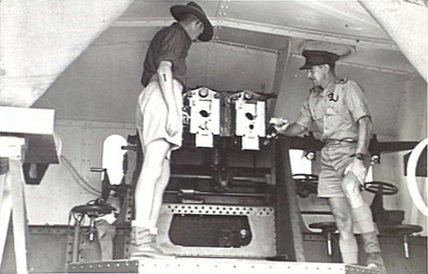
Officers inspect breeches of twin 6pdr gun. 1943. (Note: Officers inspect breeches of twin 6pdr gun. 1943. (Australian War Memorial 060048))

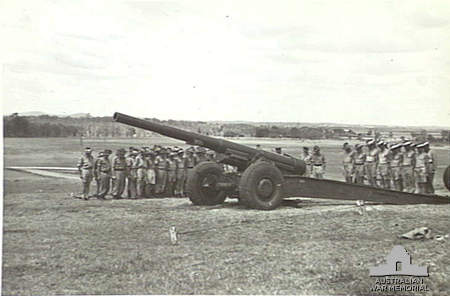
'T' Australian Heavy Battery at Fort Lytton with M1917/1918 155-millimetre (6.1 in) heavy gun. Heads are bowed during a ceremony on Armistice Day 1943 (Note: "T" Australian Heavy Battery at Fort Lytton with M1917/1918 155mm heavy gun. Heads are bowed during a ceremony on Armistice Day 1943(Australian War Memorial 060027))

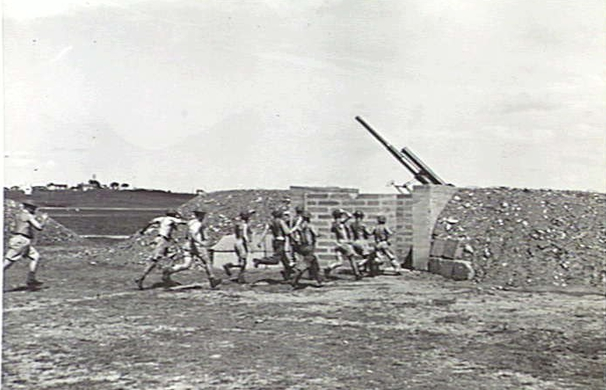
(Note: One of four 3.7-inch heavy anti-aircraft guns at Fort Lytton. 1943. (Australian War Memorial 060060))

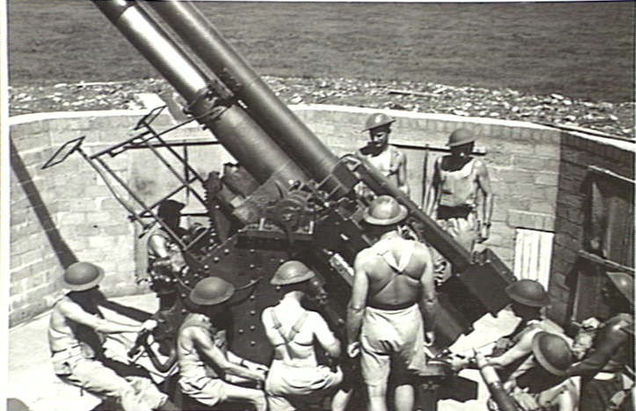
Gunners working on 3.7-inch (94 mm) heavy anti-aircraft gun. 1943. (Note: Gunners working on 3.7-inch heavy anti-aircraft gun. 1943.(Australian War Memorial 060055))

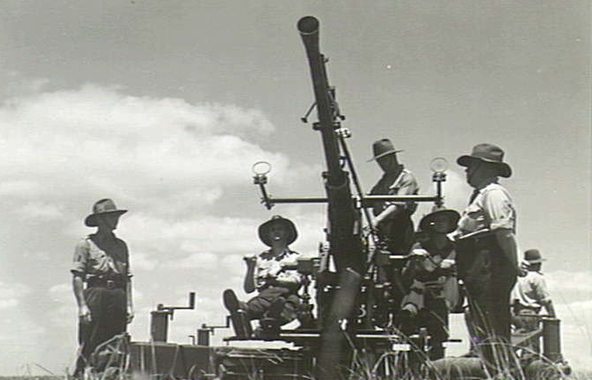
Gunners of 651st Light Anti-aircraft Battery, Volunteer Defence Corps training on Bofors gun at Fort Lytton 1944 (Note: Gunners of 651st Light Anti-aircraft Battery, Volunteer Defence Corps training on Bofors gun at Fort Lytton 1944 (Australian War Memorial 063197))
