= Lytton, Queensland =

Lytton
- Suburb
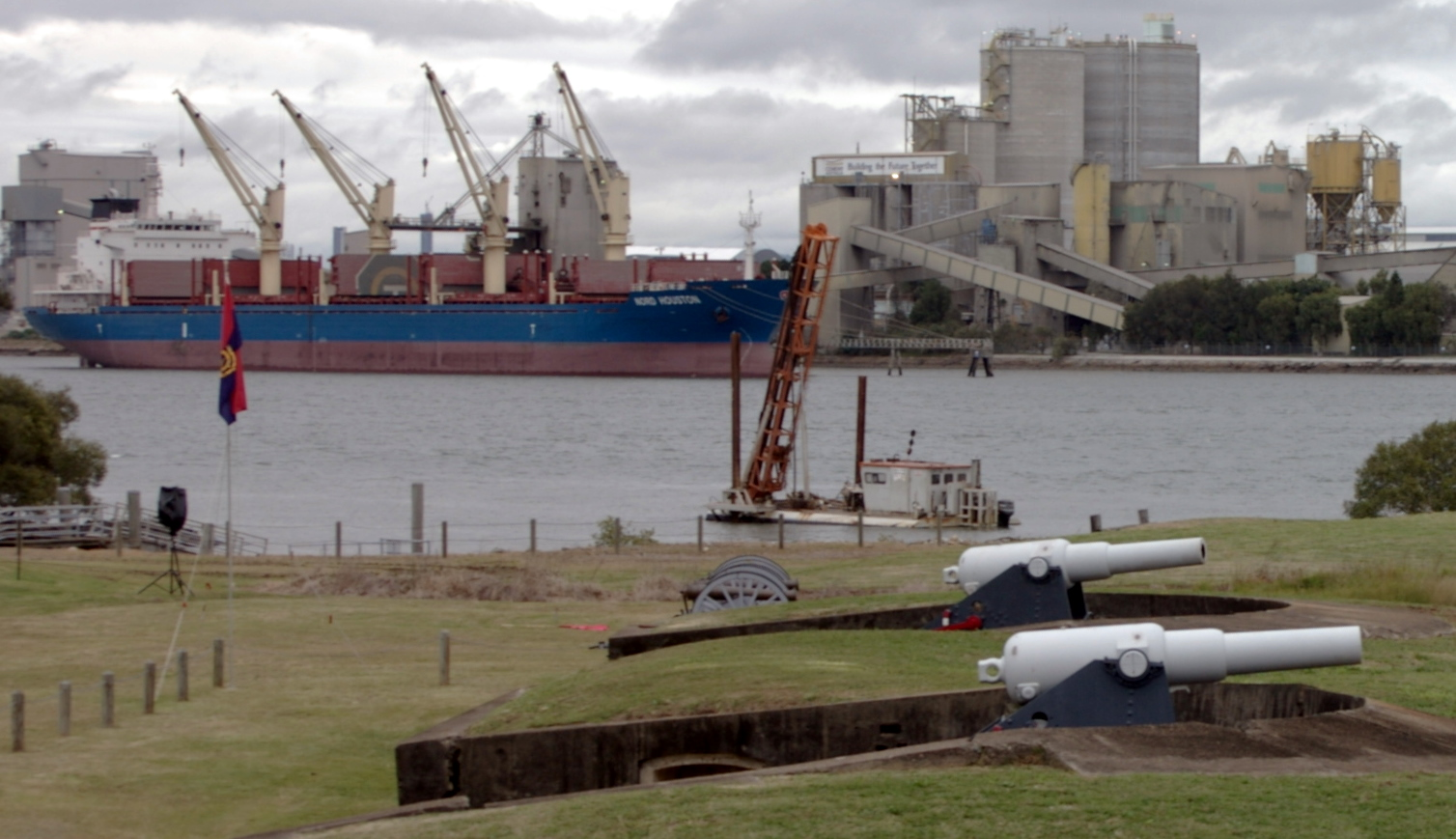
- Fort Lytton with Brisbane River in background

- Interactive map of Lytton
- Coordinates: 27.4230°S 153.1511°E
- Country: Australia
- State: Queensland
- City: Brisbane
- LGA: City of Brisbane (Wynnum Manly Ward)
- Location: 20.1 km (12.5 mi) ENE of Brisbane CBD

Government
  - State electorate: Lytton
  - Federal division: Bonner

Area
  - Total: 6.9 km^{2} (2.7 sq mi)

Population
  - Total: 0 (2021 census)
  - Density: 0.00/km^{2} (0.00/sq mi)
- Time zone: UTC+10:00 (AEST)
- Postcode: 4178
Suburbs around Lytton
Pinkenba	Port Of Brisbane	Port Of Brisbane
Pinkenba	Lytton	Wynnum
Hemmant	Wynnum West	Wynnum

Lytton is an outer riverside suburb in the City of Brisbane, Queensland, Australia. In the 2021 census, Lytton had "no people or a very low population".

The historical region was a significant naval base after the establishment of Fort Lytton between 1880 and 1881. The Fort safeguarded the city and shipping routes from hostile invasions during the colonial period as Brisbane was close to the French naval garrison at Nouméa.

== Geography ==
The suburb is bounded by the Brisbane River to the north-west. It is 13 kilometres (8.1 mi) east of the Brisbane CBD, but travel by the railway or road is considerably longer.

Lytton Hill is in the north-east of the suburb (27.4141°S 153.1619°E) 26 metres (85 ft) above sea level.

Clunie Flats is a pan in the west of the suburb (27.4266°S 153.1427°E).

== History ==
A pilot station and a village were established at Lytton in 1859. It was most likely named after Edward Bulwer-Lytton (1803–73) who was the Colonial Secretary of State in 1858–59.

It would be two years before a road was surveyed from Norman Creek.

A telegraph line was run from Brisbane to Lytton in 1862.

The hulk "Prosperine" in the Brisbane River off Lytton was used as a floating Reformatory for Boys. From 1871 to 1879 the boys were taught by the Reformatory's Sub-Inspector. From 22 July 1879 a qualified teacher was supplied by the Queensland Public Instruction Department to the Hulk "Proserpine" School, after which it was variously known as the Lytton Stockade School and the Lytton Reformatory School. In 1900 the reformatory and its school moved to Westbrook, west of Ipswich, where the facility was known as Westbrook Reformatory for Boys and the school was renamed Westbrook Reformatory School, then later renamed Westbrook Farm Home School. On 5 July 1961 the school and its primary school-aged boys moved to the Wilson Youth Hospital in Windsor, Brisbane and the school was renamed Wilson Youth Hospital School, while the older boys remained at Westbrook and had correspondence classes if desired. Wilson Youth Hospital School closed in 1968.

During the years 1876–1908, a local post office was open.

Due to Lytton's location on the south-east bank of the Brisbane River at its seaward end Fort Lytton was built in the 1881 to guard the mouth of the Brisbane River. The fort had a moat and was an pentagonal structure concealed behind an embankment. It was fortified with two six-inch disappearing guns, also in 1881 a rifle range was added.

The layout of the village can be seen in an 1889 map.

Lytton State School opened on 18 September 1882 with an initial enrolment of 41 students under teacher Mr A. S. Spencer. It was located on a 10-acre (4.0 ha) site on a hill overlooking the sea on the Old Brisbane Road, about 1.5 miles (2.4 km) from the Lytton Wharf (approx 27.4253°S 153.1638°E). In 1911, the buildings were relocated to Wynnum North and the school renamed Wynnum North State School in 1911. Wynnum North State School closed on 31 December 2010 as it was amalgamated with Lindum State School and Wynnum Central State School to create a new Wynnum State School. The Wynnum North State School site was sold and redeveloped as an apartment complex.

== Demographics ==
At the 2011 census, Lytton had a population of 6 people.

In the 2016 census, Lytton had a population of 6 people.

In the 2021 census, Lytton had "no people or a very low population".

== Heritage listings ==
Lytton has a number of heritage-listed sites, including:

- Heavy Anti-Aircraft Gun Station 385, 50 Pritchard Street (27.4131°S 153.1538°E)
- Lytton Hill, Via South Street (27.4141°S 153.1617°E)
- Fort Lytton, 160 South Street (27.4104°S 153.1514°E)
- former Lytton Quarantine Station, 160 South Street (27.4144°S 153.1505°E)

== Economy ==
Although Lytton was once a town, it is now primarily commercial and industrial. It shares the same postcode as the Port of Brisbane. Ampol owns and operates the Lytton Oil Refinery in the north east of the suburb (27.4154°S 153.1575°E). The plant could produce 109,000 barrels per day in 2012.

== Education ==
There are no schools in Lytton. The nearest government primary school is Wynnum State School in neighbouring Wynnum to the south-east. The nearest government secondary schools are Wynnum State High School in neighbouring Wynnum to the south-east and Brisbane Bayside State College in neighbouring Wynnum West to the south.

== Facilities ==
Wynnum Wastewater Treatment Plant is a sewage treatment plant on Tanker Street (27.4182°S 153.1650°E). It releases treated water into Crab Creek (27.4166°S 153.1666°E) which flows into Moreton Bay.

== Amenities ==
There are a number of parks in Lytton, including:

- Constellation Way Park (27.4319°S 153.1556°E)
- Pritchard Street Park (27.4258°S 153.1564°E)
- Sandy Camp Park (27.4340°S 153.1486°E)

== Gallery ==
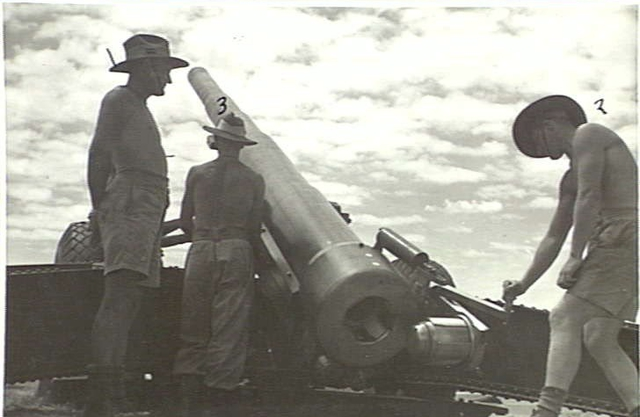
1943-11-11. Gun drill at Lytton. Left to right H. G. Brigg, A. T. Llewellan, B. F. Williams.

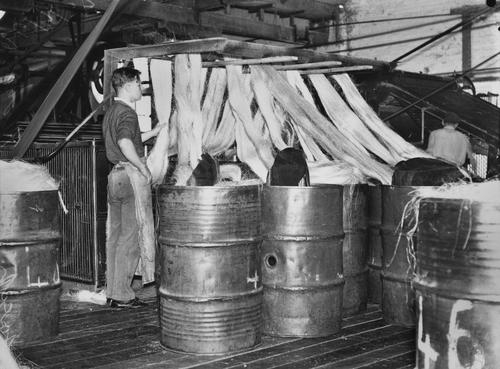
Rope works on Lytton road.

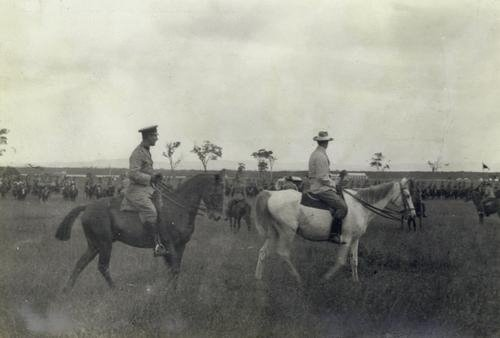
Lord Chelmsford inspecting the Light Horse camp at Lytton, April 1908

== See also ==
- List of tramways in Queensland
