= Lytton Hill =

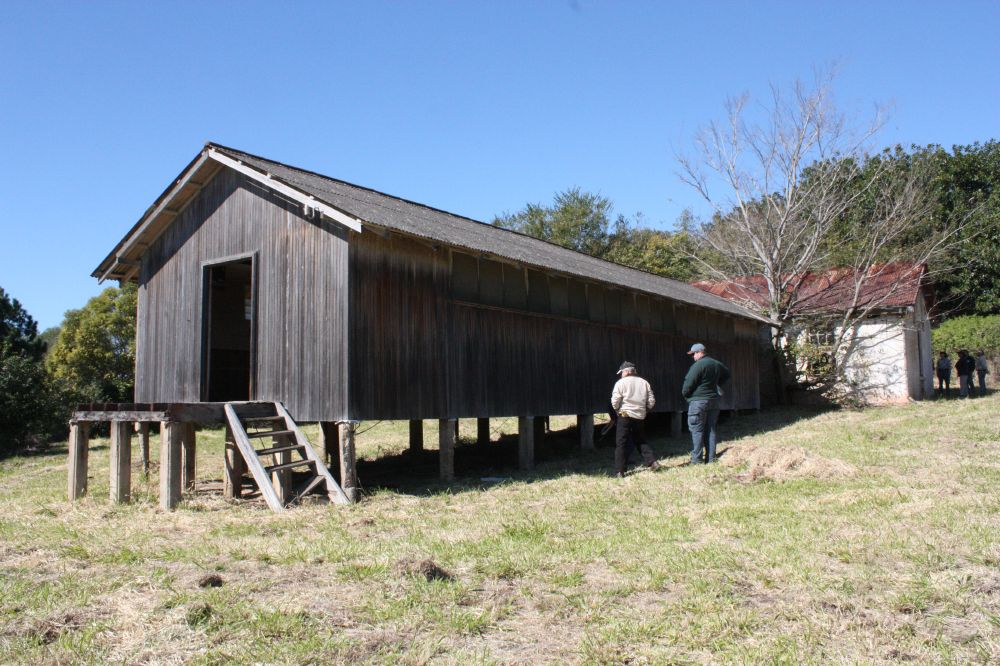
- Signal receiver centre, Lytton Hill, 2012

- Location within Queensland Location within Australia
- 27.4141°S 153.1617°E
- Location: Via South Street, Lytton, City of Brisbane, Queensland, Australia

History
- Design period: 1840s–1860s (mid-19th century)
- Built: 1859–c. 1945

Queensland Heritage Register
- Official name: Lytton Hill, Lytton Redoubt, Reformatory, Signal Hill
- Type: state heritage (archaeological, built)
- Designated: 25 August 2000
- Reference no.: 601366
- Significant period: 1859–1945 (fabric) c. 1859–1950s, c. 1980–1990s (historical)
- Significant components: redoubt, fence/wall – perimeter, store/s / storeroom / storehouse, trees/plantings, road/roadway, tank stand, post & telegraph office, signal station/post, shed/s, animal enclosure/s, culvert – storm water

Lytton Hill is a heritage-listed signal station via South Street, Lytton, City of Brisbane, Queensland, Australia. It was built from 1859 to c. 1945. It is also known as Lytton Redoubt, Reformatory, and Signal Hill. It was added to the Queensland Heritage Register on 25 August 2000.

== History ==
Lytton Hill - also known as Signal Hill, Reformatory Hill, or the Lytton Redoubt - is highly significant in Queensland history. Strategically positioned at the mouth of the Brisbane River, the hill has been used as a customs lookout, signal and telegraph station, observation post and redoubt commanding the Fort Lytton defence complex, and boys' reformatory.

The history of the Lytton district is closely aligned to the establishment during the 1840s and 1850s of the Port of Moreton Bay at Brisbane Town, on the Brisbane River, rather than at Cleveland on the Bay. In 1857 the New South Wales colonial government began to investigate the suitability of establishing a customs station at the south head of the Brisbane River (present-day Lytton). In August 1857, surveyor James Warner completed a preliminary survey of a site for a village at the south head, which was approved in November 1858, and in December 1858 tenders were called for the construction of a Customs Station nearby on the river. In February 1859 Warner officially surveyed sections 1 to 13 of the village of Lytton, as well as sites for a customs landing place and a signal station (possibly Lytton Hill).

Between 1860 and 1863 some Lytton township allotments were alienated, mostly by Brisbane speculators who anticipated the development of wharf facilities at Lytton. Few private buildings were erected there. The Crown and Anchor Hotel at Lytton held a license in 1865–66 - about the time a government wharf adjacent to the Customs Reserve was built in 1866 to tranship railway stores and plant. From 1878 until c. 1905 the Lytton Hotel served local farmers and the annual military presence.

Following separation from New South Wales in December 1859, the Queensland Government maintained Lytton's role as the customs entry to the Port of Moreton Bay. In 1860–61 an electric telegraph line was constructed from Brisbane to the Lytton Customs Station - the first telegraph line in Queensland built specifically for internal administrative use, to communicate shipping intelligence and meteorological observations from Moreton Bay. The Lytton Telegraph Office opened on 1 June 1861, the third to open in Queensland after Brisbane and Ipswich on the inter-colonial line, which had commenced operation in April 1861. In 1864 the electric telegraph was extended from Lytton via Cleveland and undersea cable to Dunwich on Stradbroke Island and north to Cape Moreton on Moreton Island.

It is possible that Lytton Hill was functioning as a signal station as early as 1859, semaphoring news of the movement of ships to and from Moreton Bay to the Customs Station below, and from 1861, to the Lytton Telegraph Office. From 1866, Signal Hill, as it became known, also proved a useful post from which to observe semaphore messages from the prison on St Helena Island, which was not connected by telegraph.

Sir George Bowen, on completion of his term as Queensland Governor and departure from Moreton Bay on 4 January 1868, officially named and designated Lytton as Brisbane's port.

The telegraph line at Lytton appears to have been extended from the Customs Reserve to Signal Hill in the early 1870s, when in 1873 tenders were called for the construction of an electric telegraph station and residence on the hill. This was a double-gabled timber building which combined office and residence, and a detached kitchen house at the rear, erected at a cost of £534. The style was the forerunner of the most common 19th century type of post and telegraph office, with decorative finishes to verandah fascias, and sun hoods. Only four of this type of post and telegraph office were constructed in Queensland - the others being at Blackall (1883–84), St George (1885) and Cunnamulla (1889). The former Lytton Telegraph Office is the only one of these four remaining, and is also one of the earliest surviving, purpose-designed, post and telegraph office buildings in Queensland - pre-dated only by the former Cardwell Post and Telegraph Office (1870), and contemporaneous with the Mount Perry (Tenningerring) and the first Ravenswood Post Office, both erected in 1873 and both substantially modified.

From 29 April 1876, the Lytton Telegraph Office also functioned as a post office. In the 1880s, telegraph lines were extended from Lytton to the Pile Light (constructed 1883) in Moreton Bay and to Fort Lytton.

The history of Lytton Hill from 1880 is closely associated with the establishment of a military facility in the locality. In 1876, in an unprecedented act of colonial cohesion, the principal Australian colonies commissioned military experts General William Francis Drummond Jervois and Colonel Peter Scratchley, both of the Royal Engineers, to advise on colonial defences. As a consequence of their reports, a system of east coast seaboard fortifications was adopted, including Jervois' 1877 recommendation that the Brisbane River be defended with the establishment of a fortification and redoubt at Lytton, commanding lines of submarine torpedoes across the shipping channel at this point. Jervois recommended that the redoubt (an independent fortlet commanding Fort Lytton) be established on Signal Hill, which he considered would be an excellent point whence to watch the movements of an enemy in Moreton Bay.

In July 1878, Scratchley recommended that the occupants of the hulk Proserpine, a former gaol anchored in Moreton Bay which had been refitted c. 1871 as a boys' reformatory, be removed to buildings on Signal Hill as part of the defensible post to be established there. He considered that the Reformatory buildings would eventually form part of the hill defences, and that the boys could help with ground preparation and maintenance associated with the defence complex.

Despite some political debate, the Queensland colonial government voted to proceed with Jervois' and Scratchley's recommendations for the defence of Brisbane. Plans for the defence complex at Lytton were prepared in the Queensland Colonial Architect's office, and approved by Jervois in February 1879. The redoubt on Signal Hill was to include a large, single-storeyed, hardwood-framed, Reformatory building with chamferboard walls and a shingled roof; kitchen wing; WCs; and a boundary fence enclosing 2 acres (0.81 ha).

The Reformatory buildings on Signal Hill were erected in 1880–81, before work started on the redoubt, using day labour assisted by the Reformatory boys. Dormitory accommodation was provided for 120 boys, along with schoolroom, workshops, store-room, kitchen and other facilities. A large vegetable garden was established and a superintendent's cottage was erected to the south of the Reformatory building, beyond the fortification earthworks. This cottage has been identified as an 1864 timber building - possibly moved from the Customs Reserve to Signal Hill c. 1880. The 1873 Post and Telegraph Office remained within the Reformatory stockade, and the complex was completed and occupied early in March 1881. At this period, Signal Hill became known as Reformatory Hill.

Following the "Russian scare" of March 1885 (the mobilisation of British and Russian troops along the Russia-Afghanistan border), Colonel George Arthur French, Commandant of the newly created Queensland Defence Force, took the opportunity to complete the fortification of the redoubt on Reformatory Hill, without which Fort Lytton was vulnerable to attack from land. To this end the stockade fence on the south side was re-erected 20 yards (18 m) nearer the Reformatory, arrow-headed demi-bastions were formed at the northeast and southwest corners, a ditch was constructed around the fortifications, the trees in front of the redoubt were cleared, a telegraph line was installed from Signal Hill to Fort Lytton below, and ordnance were ordered. In much of this work, the Reformatory boys assisted. By 1887 the Redoubt had been completed, its armament had arrived (although never mounted in position), and French recommended that the Reformatory now be removed. Finally in 1899, just prior to Federation, tenders were called for the removal of the Reformatory buildings from Lytton and their re-erection, with additions, at Westbrook near Toowoomba.

The Lytton Redoubt was used as a semi-permanent military camp from 1881 until the early 1930s, principally during the Queensland Defence Force's annual Easter Encampments, at which militia from all over Queensland gathered at Lytton to practice manoeuvres.

When the Lytton Defence Reserve of 120 acres (49 ha) (48 hectares (120 acres)) was finally gazetted late in 1887, it included Reformatory Hill, Fort Lytton, and possibly part of the Customs Reserve. By 1901 the Defence Reserve had been extended to 640 acres (260 ha) (259 hectares (640 acres)) following the resumption (in two stages: 1891 and 1900) of Lytton township for defence purposes. In the early 1900s this land and all military structures at Lytton were transferred to the new Commonwealth Department of Defence, and the Post and Telegraph Office on Lytton Hill was transferred to the new Commonwealth Post Master General's Department. At this time the only other building identified on Lytton Hill was a military store, erected in 1898 at a cost of £515. This is thought to be the brick building extant at the north end of Lytton Hill, possibly replacing the building marked "store" on an 1886 plan of the Lytton Redoubt.

The fortifications on Lytton Hill remained in use until at least the early 1900s, when Queensland troops camped and trained on the slopes of Lytton Hill for active service in the South African War (1899–1902). The preparations for war was the longest continual use of the Lytton defensive positions since they were constructed in the 1880s. Some improvements to Lytton Hill were made at this time, including the construction a 20-stall timber stables building in 1901–02, and in 1903 the erection of a tent store and barbed-wire entanglement around the Redoubt. Subsequently, the site deteriorated, prior to its re-occupation by the military during the First World War (1914–18). In 1917 a dermatological hospital for Australian Infantry Forces and huts for men and officers were erected at Lytton Hill.

Between 1919 and 1931 the flats adjacent to the Lytton Quarantine Station (established 1913–15) were used as Brisbane's first airfield, and it has been suggested that Lytton Hill may have acted as an air traffic control observation station. This has yet to be substantiated.

During the Second World War (1939–45), Lytton Hill was occupied by military signallers and engineers. A number of concrete structures were erected on the hill in association with this use. In addition, the c. 1880s brick store at the north end of the hill was remodelled as a signals building, and a timber wing added.

After 1945 the Lytton defence facilities were virtually abandoned, but military authorities maintained Lytton Hill as a communications base into the 1950s. In 1954 a wireless station with radar facilities was erected on the hill for the use of the pilot service. It was staffed on a 24-hour basis, seven days a week. Lytton Hill remained part of the Lytton Defence Reserve until title to the reserve passed to Ampol Refineries in 1963. Subsequent construction of the oil refinery and holding tanks has removed most traces of the Second World War defence installation, which included an airfield, with the exception of the top of Lytton Hill and a Second World War anti-aircraft position with concrete bunkers and gun emplacements, in the refinery grounds adjacent to Fort Lytton. For some years the post and telegraph office on Lytton Hill was occupied as a residence by an employee of the Ampol Refinery.

The Port of Brisbane Authority designated Lytton Hill as the control for the Port of Brisbane c. 1980, erecting an observation tower there to monitor Brisbane River and Moreton Bay shipping. A section of Lytton Hill was ceded from Ampol to the Port Authority for this purpose, but in the late 1990s the tower was removed and the land reverted to refinery ownership (now Caltex, with which Ampol merged in the 1990s).

A 1994 field survey conducted by Austral Archaeology identified 50 archaeological elements visible on the surface of Lytton Hill, and all located above the 20 metres (66 ft) contour line. The bulk of these remain, but the former Post and Telegraph Office was vandalised in 1994, resulting in loss of interior casement windows, doors, light fittings and fireplace surrounds and grates.

== Description ==
Lytton Hill is a small, low hill located about 250 metres (820 ft) south and west of Crab Creek, near the mouth of the Brisbane River. It is situated east/southeast of Fort Lytton and commands views over the Fort and Moreton Bay. It is located on freehold property owned by Caltex Australia Ltd, toward the eastern side of the Lytton Oil Refinery, with large oil and gas holding tanks to the north and west. The eastern side of the hill has been heavily quarried for land fill, and currently presents a red escarpment. The north and west sides of the hill have been cut back somewhat and the slopes modified to reduce water run-off and erosion.

The principal surviving historical elements in mid-2000 include:

- The former southern access road to Lytton Hill, which skirts the western margin of the site before curving north-east. The surface is of crushed blue metal gravel for about fifty per cent of its length, then is sealed for the remainder (LH-003). Since 1994, the road has become overrun with grasses (mostly kept mown), and an erosion ditch has been cut along that part of the road which curves around the western side of the hill. It appears that during this process the cattle grid (019) across the road was removed.
- A small concrete shed (LH-002) with a timber-framed, galvanised-iron gabled roof, of uncertain date, located in the southwest corner of the site near where the access road begins to curve around the hill, and marked "9" near the entrance door. The raised concrete platform inside the building, and a small concrete unroofed extension on the southern side, suggest this may have been used as a generator shed. It may have been associated with Second World War defences, but possibly is of earlier date.
- Part of the southwest demi-bastion (LH-005), a raised earthwork which formed the southwest section of the redoubt, completed in 1885. The remainder of the redoubt has been either demolished or eroded following fill being removed from the hillside.
- A timber fence (LH-004) possibly dating to the Second World War, on the western side of Lytton Hill around the former southwest demi-bastion. As the site was heavily overgrown with lantana and grasses when inspected in July 2000, it is not clear how much of the fence survives. In 1994 the fence consisted of sawn timber uprights (average height 2.5 metres (8 ft 2 in)) spaced 3.3 metres (11 ft) apart, drilled through to accommodate barbed wire strands 0.22 metres (8.7 in) apart. The uprights were sawn diagonally at the top with a bolt-fixed angled crosspiece to accommodate a further three strands of barbed wire, as in a security fence.
- The site of the former Reformatory Superintendent's compound (LH-006) - a flat area 20 by 20 metres (66 by 66 ft) on the east side of Lytton Hill, south of the Reformatory compound and Redoubt, with possible garden remnants such as freesias and guava trees.
- A lineal planting (LH-012) approximately 35 metres (115 ft) in length and 10 metres (33 ft) wide, dominated by two mature fig trees and an understorey of lantana and other fig spp. This is located just south of the former Post and Telegraph Office.
- An alignment of Pinus radiata trees (LH-018) following the access road which curves around the northern end of the site. A 1972 aerial photograph shows these trees once lined both sides of the road, forming an avenue approach to the former signals building – by 1994, all but one of the pines on the outside edge of the road had been removed.
- The former Lytton Post and Telegraph Office (1873) (LH-024), a weatherboard building on timber stumps (with some replacement concrete piers). It has a hipped roof with gabled transepts at each end. The roof is clad with corrugated iron, covering the original shingles, and there are two brick chimneys, which have sandstone bases. The front (north) has a small central verandah, which has been enclosed. The original kitchen house is extant, and has a skillion-roofed extension of later date. There is a timber-framed external bathroom shed clad with corrugated iron. The interior of the main building has been modified with the removal of one wall. The interior is lined with horizontally-jointed tongue and groove timber boards, much of which is wide, centrally beaded.
- A rectangular concrete structure (LH-023) adjacent to the former Telegraph Office, probably associated with the Second World War facility established on Lytton Hill. The long axis is aligned east–west and the entrance is via a sliding timber door on the southern side. The structure has a flat concrete roof surmounted by a square concrete footing which supports an inset timber frame covered with corrugated iron. This appears to have functioned as a recess and mounting for an internal structure or machinery no longer present. Internally, the structure comprises two rooms, the east room being larger than the west room.
- A former butcher's shop/meat store (LH-027) – a timber-framed structure clad in fibrous cement and corrugated iron, with fly-wire windows on the south, west and north sides, and a corrugated iron roof. Internally, the building has a small servery at the western end, behind which is the butcher's shop, with two overhead pipes for hanging carcasses. Beyond this is a timber cool room with sheet metal floor covering and sheet metal around the cool room door. The latter is a wooden unit on runners with a guiding overhead rail. There is an access chute to an adjacent holding pen.
- A holding pen (LH-028) associated with the former butcher's shop/meat store, measuring 9 metres (30 ft) long by 6 metres (20 ft) wide, with a perimeter fence of steel posts with wire mesh. A plywood chute on the west side provides access to the butcher shop/meat store.
- A former signals building (LH-031), comprising a c. 1898 brick (English bond) building aligned east–west at the northern end of the site, with a substantial northern annex of vertically jointed tongue-and-groove timber boards (1940s). The brick building rests on a concrete foundation, has a corrugated iron roof, early 6-paned double-hung sash windows in the western and northern elevations, and a doorway in the eastern wall. Internally, the brick section has two rows of cone-shaped porcelain insulators attached to the ceiling, and remnant material used to insulate high tension electric wiring or antennae entering the building. A timber floor has been constructed above an earlier concrete floor, and a network of underfloor channels, possibly once housing for cables, is visible between the two floors. In the southwest corner of the room is a heavy duty switch board, and a large power board is located in the middle of the western wall, in front of a window. There are tiles, possibly of rubber, on the floor. A large opening in the north wall of the brick building leads, via a timber-framed enclosed walkway, to the Second World War timber extension, which is high-set on reinforced concrete piers and has a corrugated fibrous-cement roof. It is accessed externally from the northern end, via a small flight of timber steps. The fibrous-cement ceiling of this extension has been removed.

Later structures on the site include a sheet and corrugated iron lined garage shed on a concrete slab, located to the southwest of the former telegraph office (010); and SEQEB substation SG1061 - a brick generator shed set on a concrete slab, with a corrugated iron roof and roller door entry (021).

A pile of broken concrete to the southwest of the signals building suggests that some "tidying" of the site has occurred since 1994. A number of elements identified in the 1994 report may or may not survive, including: a large rectangular concrete slab with part of a stone wall base along the north side, adjacent to the brick section of the former signals building, and known to have been extant by 1890 (LH-043); a concrete pier (001); iron posts (009, 022); a concrete footing (011); an iron water pipe (013) near the service wing of the former telegraph office; a small earthwork (016); collapsed timber and wire fencing (017, 033); concrete slabs (007, 025, 026, 029, 035, 037, 038, 039, 040, 041, 045, 050); a concrete pathway (030); a concrete pit (032); a concrete culvert (034); a small timber-framed lean-to with corrugated asbestos cladding to three sides and a corrugated iron roof, damaged by fire (036); a north–south aligned bridge with east–west aligned culvert headwalls spanning a former drainage channel (042); a Y-shaped path and junction to the south and east of the butcher's shop/meat store (044); a small rectangular concrete housing for metal taps (046); a concrete drain (047); a cast iron grate (moveable relic – 048); and fragments of earthenware piping near the quarry on the east side of the hill (049).

In July 2000 there appeared to be little evidence of the collapsed galvanised iron tank and stand (LH-014) to the southwest of the former Post and Telegraph Office, identified in the 1994 survey; nor of a flagpole (LH-020) comprising a galvanised iron upright with pulley, located northeast of the former cattle grid across the access road on the western side of the hill, and likely associated with a Second World War facility. Two corrugated galvanised iron tanks on concrete slabs (LH-015), aligned east–west, west of the tank stand, have collapsed and have been crushed and left as a pile of rusting iron.

The site has numerous plantings associated with occupation of the hill since at least 1873. A mature Ficus macrophylla (Moreton Bay fig) to the northeast of the former Post and Telegraph Office may pre-date non-indigenous occupation.

== Heritage listing ==
Lytton Hill was listed on the Queensland Heritage Register on 25 August 2000 having satisfied the following criteria.

The place is important in demonstrating the evolution or pattern of Queensland's history.

Lytton Hill is important in illustrating the evolution of Queensland's history, being: - a significant communication and observation post at the mouth of the Brisbane River from c. 1860, illustrating the dependence of the Australian colonies on maritime trade and communications in the 19th century; - associated with the early and rapid adoption of the electric telegraph in Queensland in the 1860s/1870s; - a strategic and integral component of the 1880s military facility established at Lytton to defend the Brisbane River; - associated with the conduct of a Boys Reformatory on the Hill from 1880 to 1899; - associated with the activities of the Queensland militia from the early 1880s to the early 1930s and with Queensland preparation for participation in the South African War; - the site of a military hospital during the First World War; - the site of a strategic signals station during the Second World War; - the site of the Control Tower for the Port of Brisbane in the late 20th century.

The place demonstrates rare, uncommon or endangered aspects of Queensland's cultural heritage.

The site has rarity value, not least for its layering of strategic communication, observation and defence roles for over 130 years. The 1873 former Telegraph Office is the only known surviving example of its age and type in Queensland, and is one of the earliest surviving purpose-designed post and telegraph offices in the State. The surviving section of the Redoubt is a rare example of a defence fortification built in Queensland in the 1880s.

The place has potential to yield information that will contribute to an understanding of Queensland's history.

As an archaeological site, the hill has the potential to reveal traces of occupation from Separation until the present.

The place is important in demonstrating the principal characteristics of a particular class of cultural places.

The 1873 former Telegraph Office is the only known surviving example of its age and type in Queensland, and is one of the earliest surviving purpose-designed post and telegraph offices in the State.

The place is important because of its aesthetic significance.

The place has aesthetic value for its sense of dramatic isolation and ruin within the surrounding well-ordered oil refinery, and for the panoramic views both from and to the hill.

The place has a strong or special association with a particular community or cultural group for social, cultural or spiritual reasons.

The site is significant socially for its association with the development of military culture in Queensland from the 1880s to the 1930s; and as the site of the Reformatory where boys were educated and trained in Queensland in the last two decades of the 19th century.
