= Elrington Halt railway station =

Disused railway station in Northumberland, England

Coordinates: 54.9647°N 2.2161°W

Elrington Halt

General information
- Location: Elrington, Haydon Bridge, Northumberland; England
- Grid reference: NY863634
- Platforms: 1

History
- Original company: Hexham and Allendale Railway
- Pre-grouping: North Eastern Railway
- Post-grouping: London and North Eastern Railway; North Eastern Region of British Railways

Key dates
- 19 August 1867: Station opened to goods as Elrington
- 1 March 1869: Station opens to passengers
- 23 August 1926: Station renamed Elrington Halt
- 22 September 1930: Station closed to passengers
Location

Elrington Halt station is a closed stone-built railway station situated on a single-track branch railway line in Northumberland, England, that ran from Allendale through the Border Counties Junction to Hexham.

== History ==
Authorised in 1865, the Hexham to Allendale Railway was opened in stages, first to Langley-on-Tyne in 1867 and then to Allendale (then known as Catton Road) in 1868. Built to carry freight, primarily the product of local lead mines, the line eventually opened to passengers. The passenger service was run by the North Eastern Railway, which took over the line in July 1876.

The station was unstaffed and renamed Elrington Halt in August 1926. It was closed to passengers in September 1930 and completely when the line closed on 20 November 1950. The station building remains as a private residence.

Former Services

Preceding station	Disused railways	Following station
Langley-on-Tyne	London and North Eastern Railway; Hexham and Allendale Railway	Hexham
