= Yelvertoft =

Village in Northamptonshire, England

Coordinates: 52.374°N 1.123°W

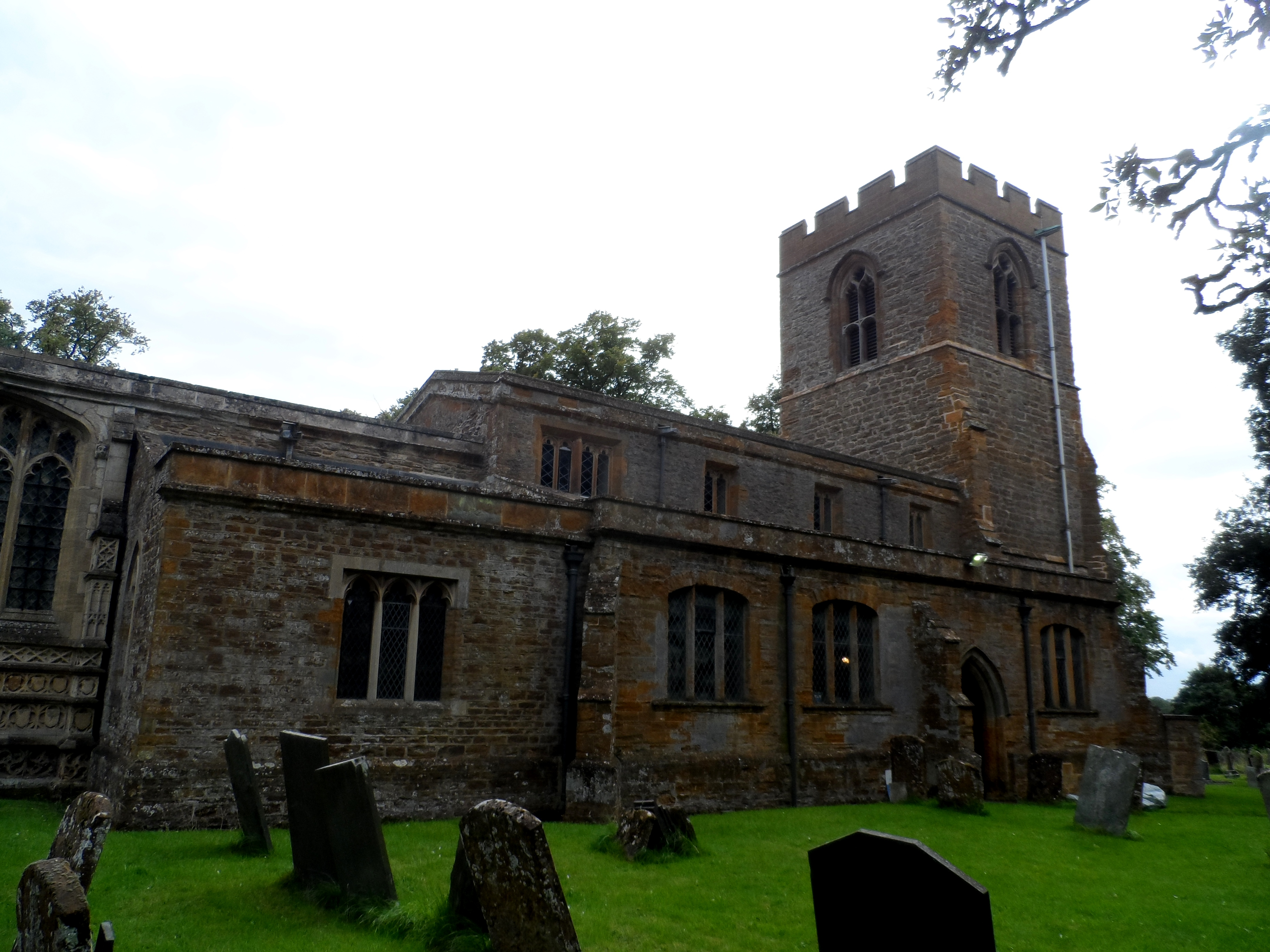
- All Saints' Church, Yelvertoft

- Location within Northamptonshire
- Population: 804 (2021 census)
- OS grid reference: SP5975
- Civil parish: Yelvertoft
- Unitary authority: West Northamptonshire
- Ceremonial county: Northamptonshire
- Region: East Midlands
- Country: England
- Sovereign state: United Kingdom
- Post town: NORTHAMPTON
- Postcode district: NN6
- Dialling code: 01788
- Police: Northamptonshire
- Fire: Northamptonshire
- Ambulance: East Midlands
- UK Parliament: Daventry
- Website: Yelvertoft Parish Council

Yelvertoft is a village and civil parish in West Northamptonshire, England. At the time of the 2001 Census, the parish's population was 821, reducing to 764 at the 2011 Census, increasing again to 804 at the 2021 Census.

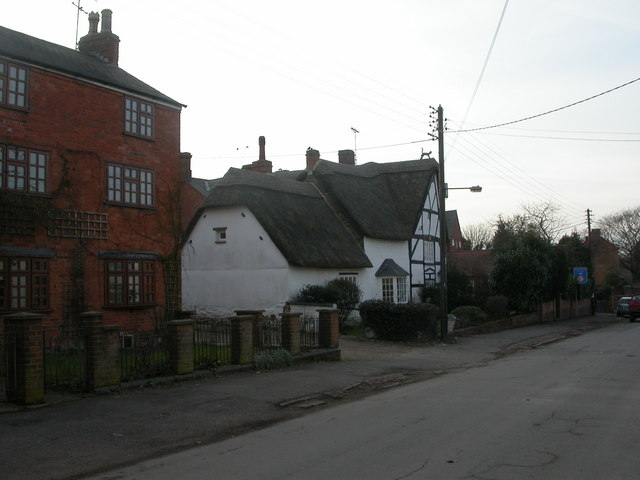
The Old Gable thatched cottage, High Street

Yelvertoft's main thoroughfare, called High Street, is approximately three quarters of a mile long, from the Parish Church of All Saints to the Village Hall. This linear street follows the course of an ancient Portway known as Salters Way.

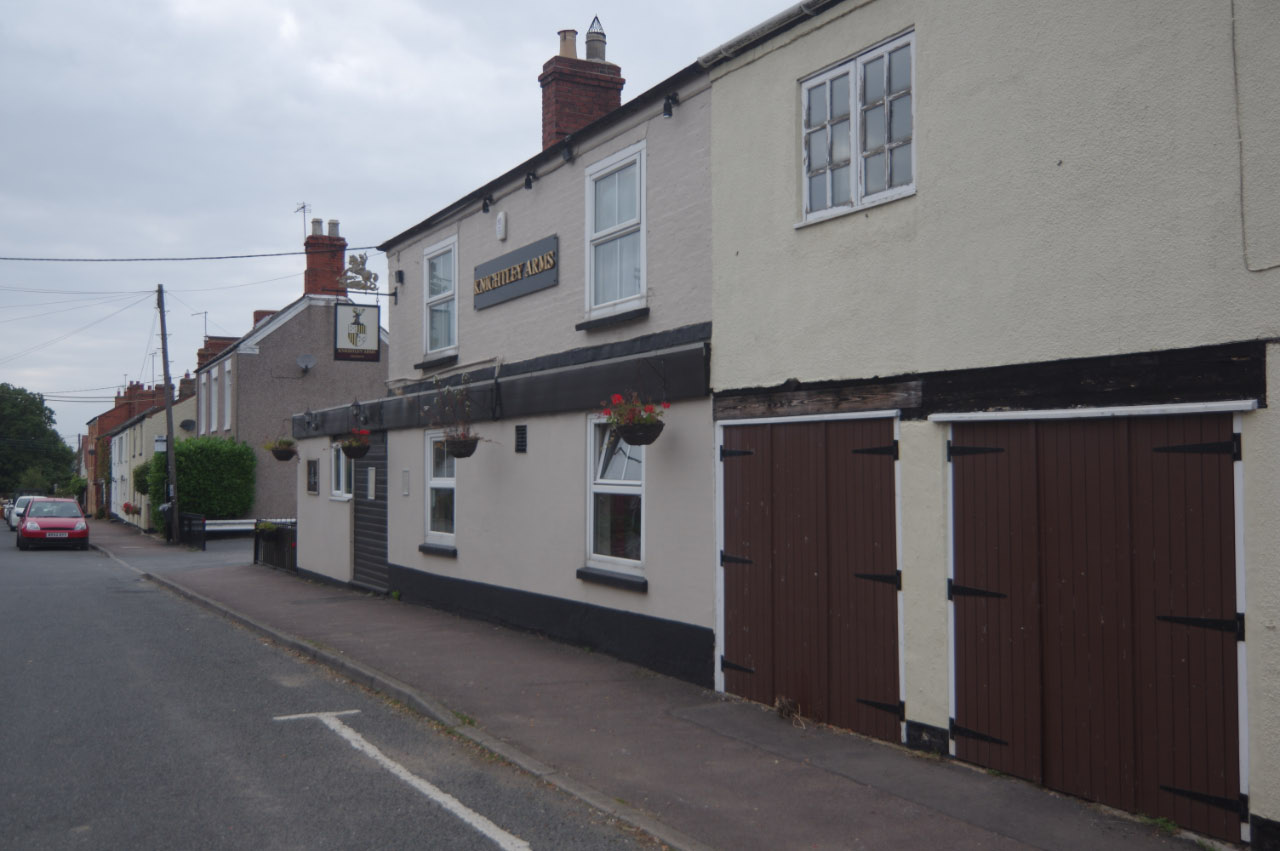
Knightley Arms pub, Yelvertoft

== History ==
The village was recorded in the Domesday Book in 1086, where a priest was mentioned.

The village's name means 'curtilage of Geldfrith'. Old English 'cot', 'cotu', 'cottage(s)' may have been the original generic.

Yelvertoft has maintained a more independent, rural character compared to other villages in the region, such as Crick, because no major transport routes pass through it.

Sites of historical interest include a monument built for the 13th century Rector of the All Saints Church, John Drycson, a charity school building constructed in 1792 (the school was established in 1711) which now serves as the Reading Room, and a town pump dating from 1900, which was renovated in 2000.

== Geography ==
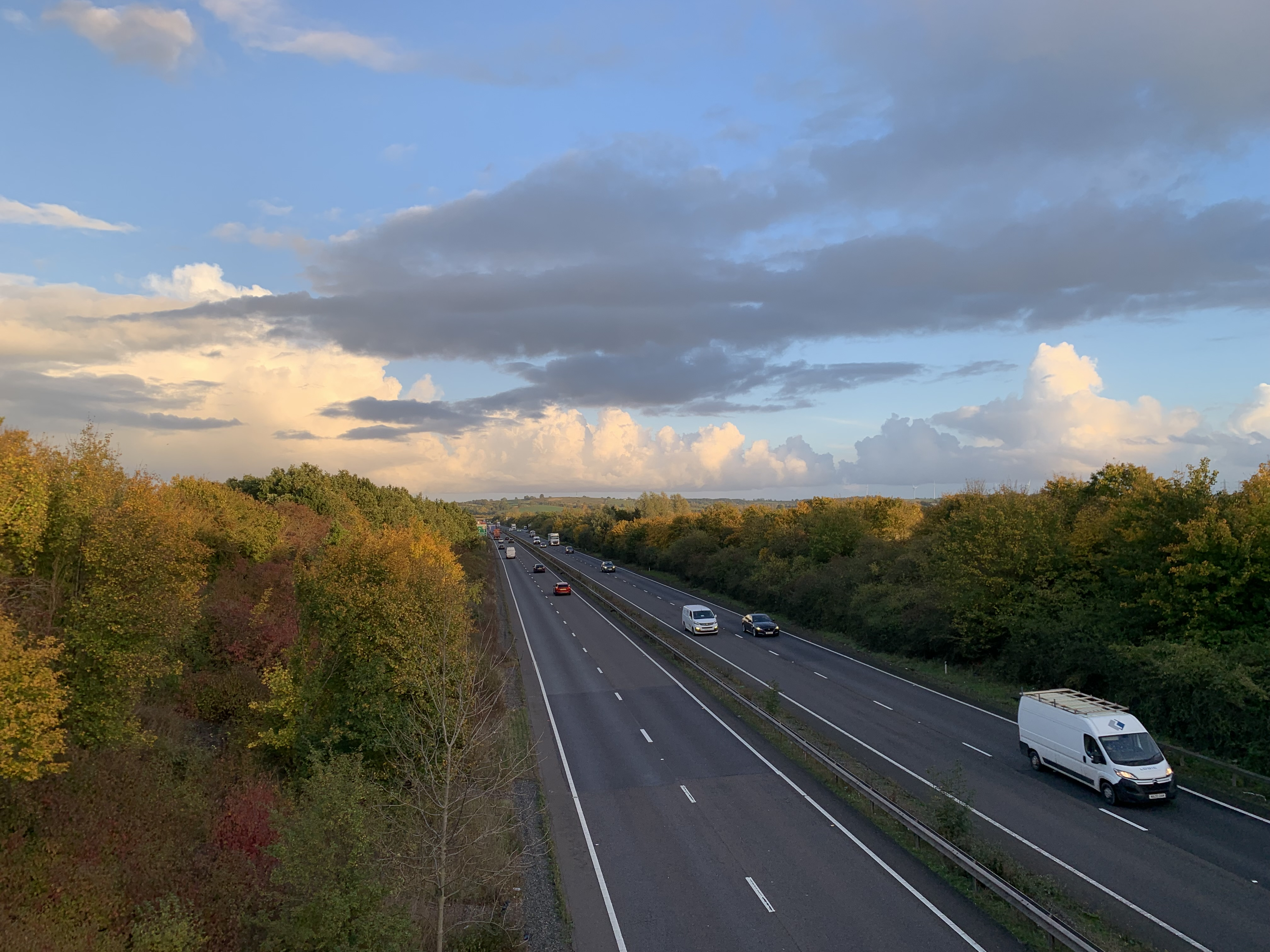
the A14 passes around 3 km north of the village. Looking east, Honey Hill and the Northamptonshire Uplands can be seen.

Yelvertoft lies on a limestone rock belt which stretches from the south coast to Yorkshire.

The village is located in an area of relatively flat land and low hills called the Vale of Rugby. Roughly 4 km to the east of the village, the eastern edge of the Vale can be found at the beginning of the northern Northamptonshire Uplands and Hemplow Hills, roughly beginning at Honey Hill to the west of Elkington, and stretching south past Cracks Hill to the Watford Gap.

To the west of the village, the vale continues until the edge of the Dunsmore Heath, roughly 6 km away, at the edge of the town of Rugby, beyond Lilbourne.

Flowing through the northern edge of the village, the Yelvertoft Brook, a tributary of the Avon can be found. Due to the low-lying nature of the village, and the sometimes heavy flow of water through the brook, the village has experienced flooding on several occasions, most recently in February 2024.

== Demography ==
According to the figures obtained at the Census 2001 there are 851 people living in the village, in a total of some 356 houses.

== Facilities ==
Yelvertoft has three churches (Anglican, Congregational, Roman Catholic), a primary school, a butcher's shop/delicatessen, a public house, an Equestrian centre and many small businesses.

Recreational facilities are mainly centred around the village hall and comprises a sports field with cricket and football pitches, a pocket park, children's play area, skate park and a basketball court.

Fieldside Covert is a woodland near the village. It covers a total area of 6.11 hectares (15.10 acres). It is owned and managed by the Woodland Trust.

== Sport ==
Cricket

Yelvertoft currently only has a cricket team, Yelvertoft Cricket Club, which was established in 1905. The club previously operated out of their old ground on the bridleway between Yelvertoft and Crick via Cracks Hill, but moved to the new cricket pitch at the village hall in 2009. They currently operate two teams, with the first XI being in division seven of the Northants Cricket League system.

Football

Yelvertoft previously had a football team which played regularly in the Rugby and District Sunday League division and was established in 1987. In 2023 the club ceased operating regularly, however a charity match is still organised every Christmas, they played in a black and white strip.

Rugby Union

Yelvertoft previously had a Rugby team which operated until 1999, playing under the name the "Knightley Arms Games Society (KnAGS)". The team played in a navy and white strip. The Knightley Arms was used for changing and catering, and games took place on a rugby pitch next to canal bridge 21 to the east of the village. The pitch was deconstructed in 2004. The KnAGS also organised walks and other charity events outside of their rugby team.

== Transport links ==
Yelvertoft has few accessible transport links.

Bus

There are currently no regular bus services to or from Yelvertoft.

Rail

Railway stations in towns near Yelvertoft include Long Buckby, Market Harborough, Rugby and Northampton. The village previously had access to the Yelvertoft and Stanford Park railway station, which lay around 3 km to the north of Yelvertoft, but this was closed in 1966.

Road

Yelvertoft is linked by road with access to Junction 18 of the M1 motorway within 5 minutes drive from the village. Following improvements to Catthorpe interchange in 2016/17 it is no longer possible to leave or join either the M1 or M6 from local roads at Junction 19. Junction 1 of the M6 and J20 of the M1 are both within 15 minutes drive from Yelvertoft.

Canal

The Grand Union Canal passes close to the village.
