= Elrington =

Elrington is a surname. Notable people with the surname include:

- Charles Richard Elrington
- Christopher Elrington, English historian
- Thomas Elrington (disambiguation)
- Wilfred Elrington (born 1948), Belizean politician
- William Sandys Elrington (1780—1860), British military officer and colonial settler of New South Wales, Australia.

== See also ==
- Ellington (disambiguation)
- Elkington (disambiguation)
- Elrington, a hamlet in Northumberland, England
- Elrington Halt railway station
