= Elkington =

Elkington may refer to:

== People ==
- Elkington (surname)

== Places ==
- Elkington, Lincolnshire, England
- Elkington, Northamptonshire, England

== See also ==
- Elkington Forest, Canada
- Elkington & Co., defunct silverware manufacturer in Birmingham, England
