= Staward Halt railway station =

Disused railway station in Northumberland, England

Coordinates: 54.9312°N 2.3037°W

Staward Halt
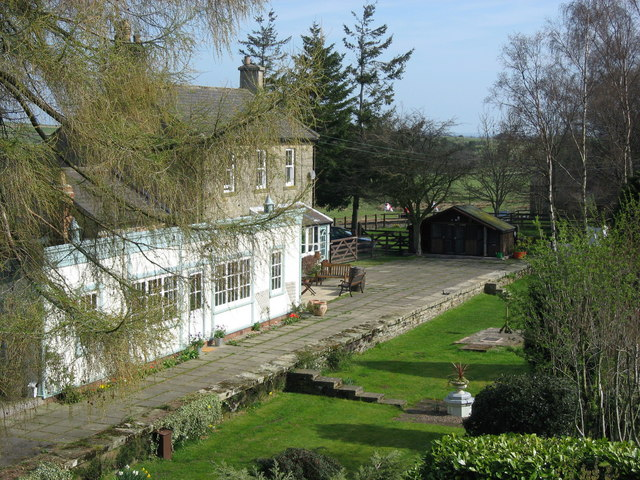
- Station building in 2007.

General information
- Location: High Staward, Catton, Northumberland; England
- Grid reference: NY806597
- Platforms: 1

Other information
- Status: Disused

History
- Original company: Hexham and Allendale Railway
- Pre-grouping: North Eastern Railway
- Post-grouping: London and North Eastern Railway; North Eastern Region of British Railways

Key dates
- 13 January 1868: Station opened to goods as Staward
- 1 March 1869: Station opens to passengers
- 22 September 1930: Station closed to passengers
- 1 April 1939: Station renamed Staward Halt
- 20 November 1950: Station closed to freight
Location

Staward Halt is a closed stone built railway station situated on a single track branch railway line in Northumberland, England, that ran from Allendale through to Hexham.

== History ==
Authorised in 1865 the Hexham to Allendale Railway was opened in stages, first to Langley-on-Tyne in 1867, then to Allendale (then known as Catton Road) in 1869. Built to carry freight, primarily the product of local lead mines, the line eventually opened to passengers. The passenger service was run by the North Eastern Railway who took over the line in July 1876.

The station was closed to passengers in September 1930, and for freight when the line closed on 20 November 1950.

Former Services

Preceding station	Disused railways	Following station
Langley-on-Tyne	London and North Eastern Railway; Hexham and Allendale Railway	Allendale
