= Ashby, Northamptonshire =

The English county of Northamptonshire has several places within its boundaries with Ashby as part of their name; these include:

- Ashby St Ledgers
- Canons Ashby
- Castle Ashby
- Cold Ashby
- Mears Ashby
