= Langley-on-Tyne railway station =

Disused railway station in Northumberland, England

Coordinates: 54.9456°N 2.2690°W

Langley-on-Tyne
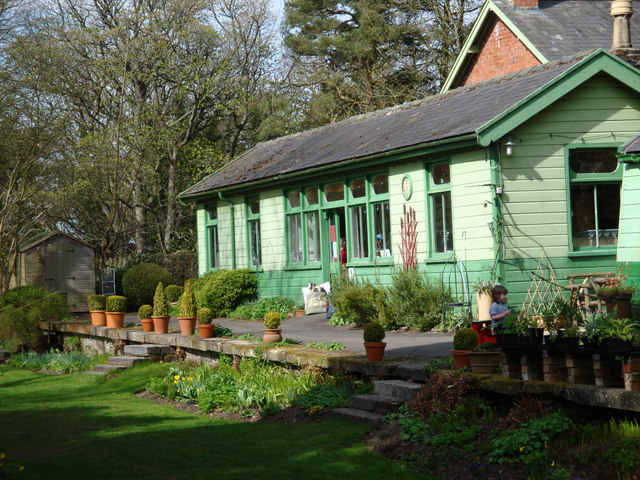

General information
- Location: Langley-on-Tyne, Northumberland; England
- Grid reference: NY829613
- Platforms: 1

Other information
- Status: Disused

History
- Original company: Hexham and Allendale Railway
- Pre-grouping: North Eastern Railway
- Post-grouping: London and North Eastern Railway; North Eastern Region of British Railways

Key dates
- 19 August 1867: Station opened to goods as Langley
- 1 March 1869: Station opens to passengers
- 22 September 1930: Station closed to passengers
- 29 July 1936: Station renamed Langley-on-Tyne
- 20 November 1950: Station closed to freight
Location

Langley-on-Tyne is a closed stone built railway station situated on a single track branch railway line in Northumberland, England, that runs from Allendale through the Border Counties Junction to Hexham. It is now a cafe and garden

== History ==
Authorised in 1865 the Hexham to Allendale Railway was opened in stages, first to Langley-on-Tyne in 1867, then to Allendale (then known as Catton Road) in 1868. Built to carry freight, primarily the product of local lead mines, the line eventually opened to passengers. The passenger service was run by the North Eastern Railway who took over the line in July 1876.

The station was closed to passengers in September 1930, and for freight when the line closed on 20 November 1950.

Former Services

Preceding station	Disused railways	Following station
Elrington Halt	London and North Eastern Railway; Hexham and Allendale Railway	Staward Halt

== Present day ==
The station buildings have been converted into a garden centre and café.
