= Honey Hill, Northamptonshire =

Small elevation in England

Honey Hill
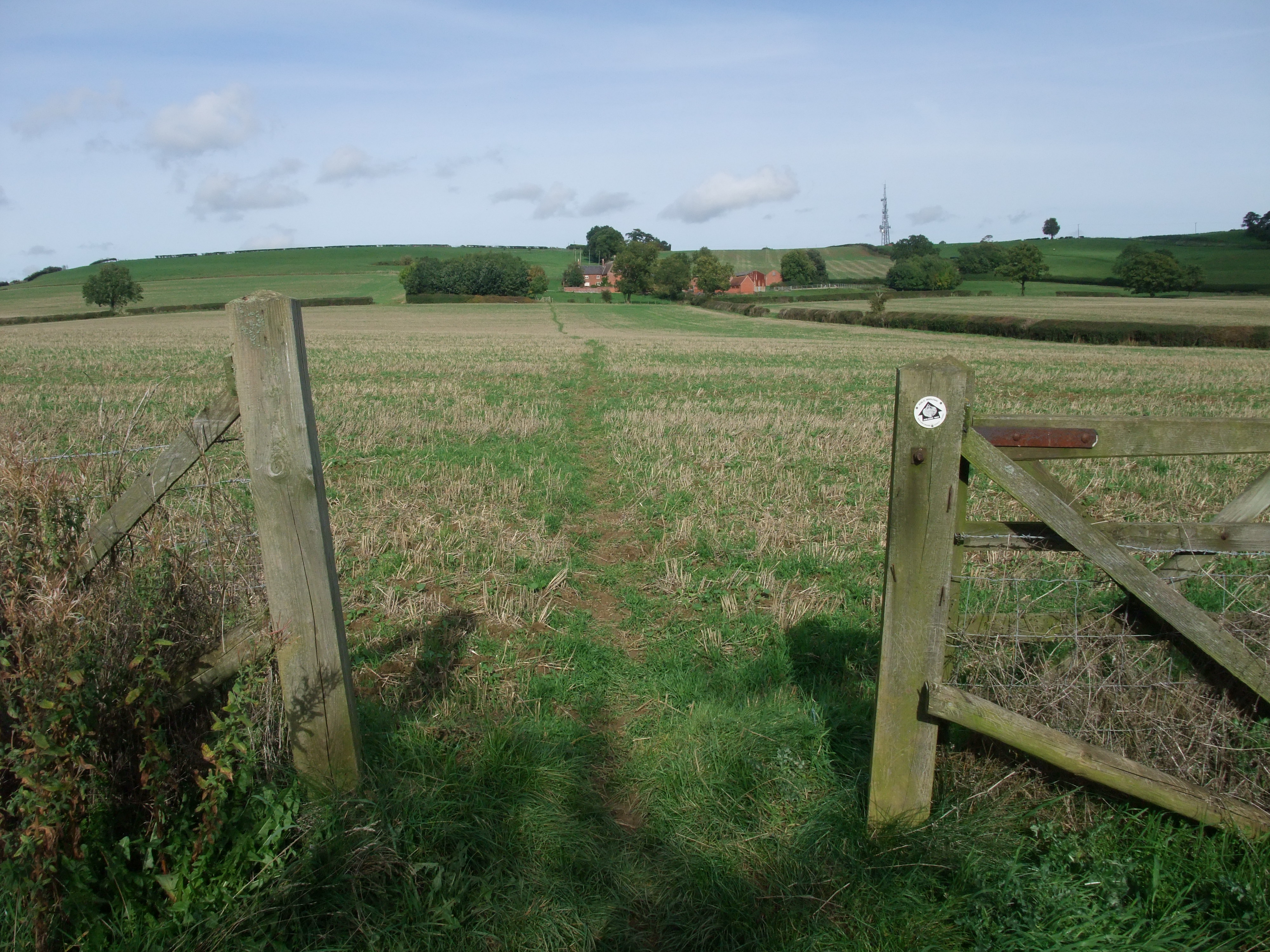

Highest point
- Elevation: 217m
- Prominence: 71m

Geography
- Location: Northamptonshire, United Kingdom

Honey Hill is a small elevation located in West Northamptonshire, approximately 1 km northwest of Elkington . It is part of the Northamptonshire Uplands hill range, and forms the edge of the upland area and the flatter Vale of Rugby. It is the second most prominent hill in the county.

== Geography ==
=== Views ===
The hill face provides views in a westerly, northerly and southerly direction over the Vale of Rugby and the Northamptonshire Uplands, notable views include those of Rugby, DIRFT, and the beginning of the A14.

Further away, the Watford Gap, Borough Hill, Arbury Hill, Catthorpe Interchange and even Beacon Hill, Leicestershire can be seen. It is often cited as having some of the best views in the county.

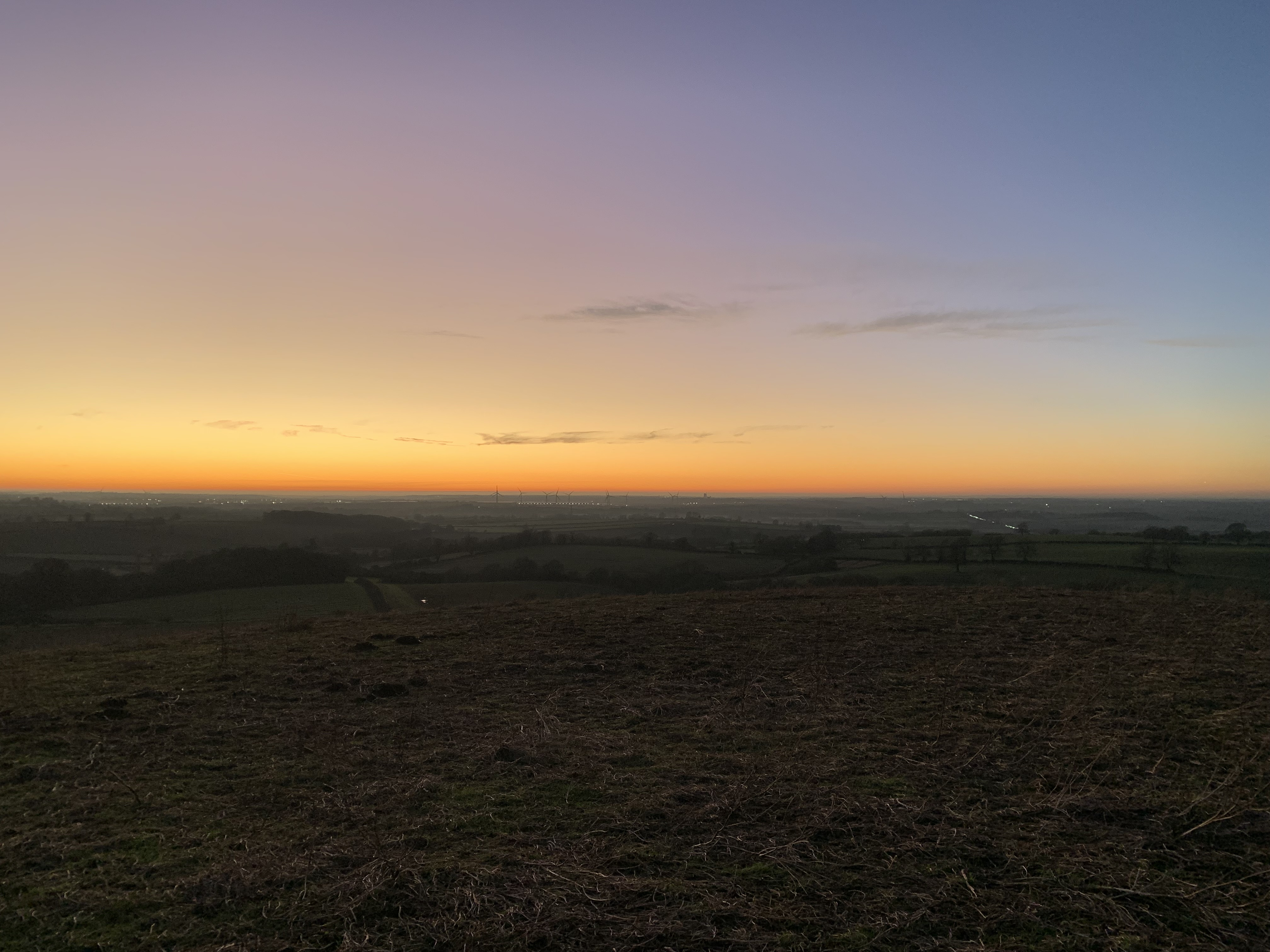
A view west, DIRFT and Rugby Cement Works, and the A14 are visible

=== Human Settlement ===
The hill is located around 1 km northeast of Elkington, 2 km west of Cold Ashby, and 4 km northeast of Yelvertoft. There are 3 farms located on the hillside and the land on the hill is used for a mixture of arable and crop farming.

To the east of the hill, there are two separate radio masts, both of which are located on farmland.

Further east, Cold Ashby Golf Club is located. Many of the holes on the course are built on the hillside.

Stanford Road, a minor road linking Cold Ashby and Stanford, runs along the top of the hill and down the north face before turning west and continuing along the Avon floodplain towards Stanford.

The Jurassic Way was officially opened on the hill in 1994 and the hill forms an approximate midpoint of the path.
