= Elkington, Northamptonshire =

Hamlet and civil parish in Northamptonshire, England

Coordinates: 52.38298°N 1.08318°W

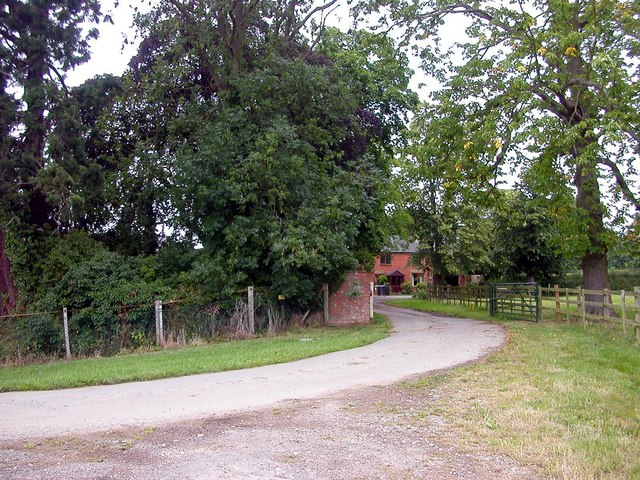
An image of Elkington, Northamptonshire

Elkington is a hamlet and civil parish in the West Northamptonshire in England.

The villages name means 'Elta's hill' or perhaps, less likely, 'swan hill'.

The village was described as Elkynton and other variants in 1377, having 30 taxpayers over the age of 14. However, in 1412 the village is described as destitute of inhabitants save the seven who were servitors at Pipewell Abbey due to a pestilence believed to be the plague. Today there are no houses left in the village except a single remaining farm. Outlines of the village street can be seen from a survey taken from the air. The site of the former settlement is close to bridge 28 on the Leicester section of the Grand Union Canal, and it lies approximately 1km southwest of Honey Hill in the Northamptonshire Uplands.

It is from this village that many of the Elkington branches of that surname are supposed to have been descended; mostly the Leicestershire and Oxfordshire/Warwickshire branches come from that region.
