= Lytton Quarantine Station =

Heritage-listed former quarantine station in Brisbane, Queensland, Australia

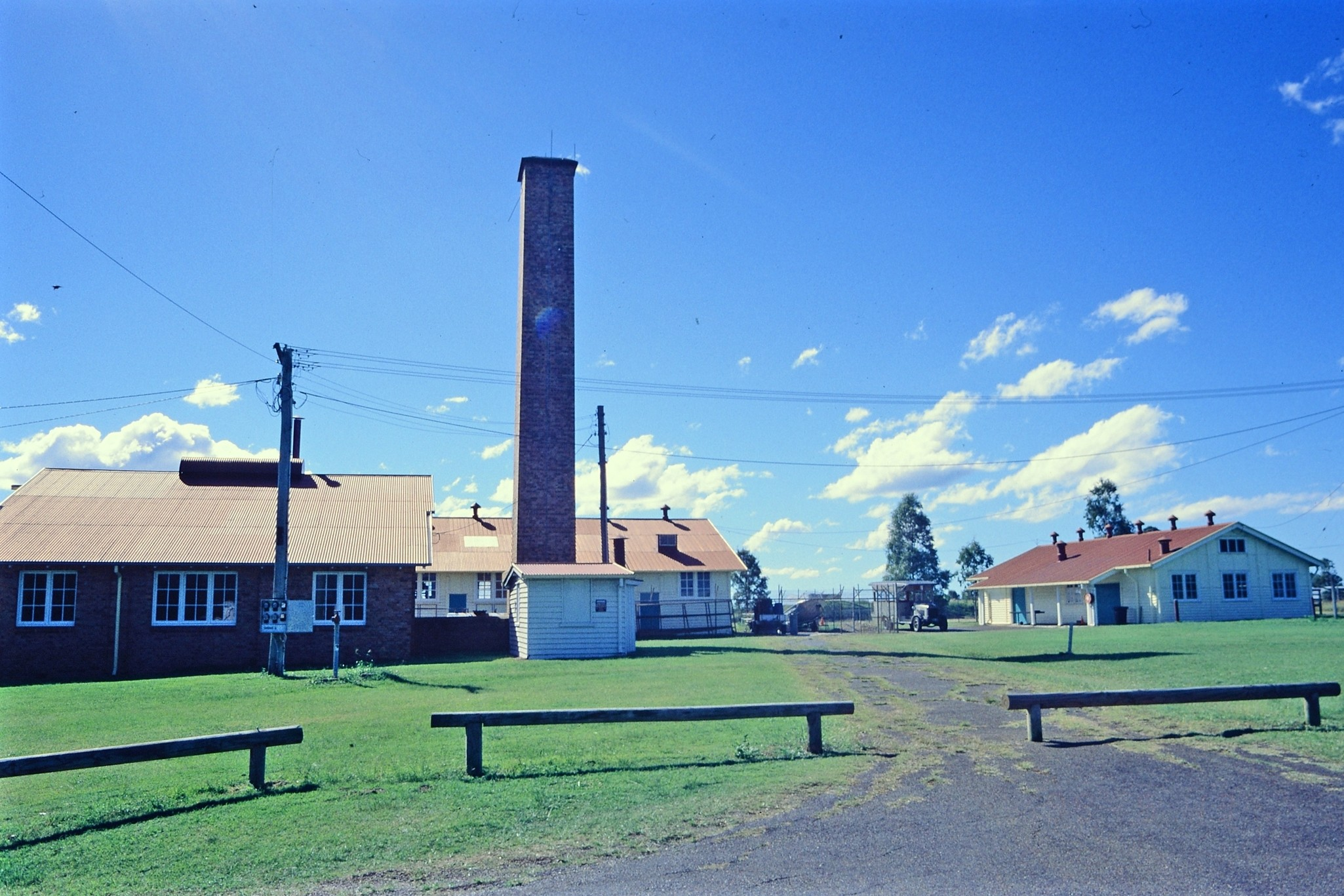
- Lytton Quarantine Station

- Location within Queensland Location within Australia
- 27.4144°S 153.1505°E
- Location: 160 South Street, Lytton, City of Brisbane, Queensland, Australia

History
- Design period: 1900–1914 (early 20th century)
- Built: 1913–c. 1914

Queensland Heritage Register
- Official name: Lytton Quarantine Station (former), Customs Reserve, Fort Lytton National Park, Lytton Quarantine Complex and Animal Detention Centre
- Type: state heritage (built, archaeological)
- Designated: 22 September 2000
- Reference no.: 601347
- Significant period: 1913–1914 (fabric); 1859, 1889, 1914–1982, 1919 (historical)
- Significant components: shed/s, sewage farm/treatment site, machinery/plant/equipment – health/care services, jetty/pier, residential accommodation – staff housing, bathroom/bathhouse, objects (movable) – law/order, immigration, customs, quarantine, tramway, workshop, trees/plantings, yard, drainage, reception area/house, residential accommodation – doctor's house/quarters, chimney/chimney stack, disinfecting room, laundry / wash house, boiler room/boiler house, slab/s – concrete

Lytton Quarantine Station is a heritage-listed former quarantine station in Lytton, City of Brisbane, Queensland, Australia. It was built from 1913 to c. 1914. It is also known as the Customs Reserve and Lytton Quarantine Complex and Animal Detention Centre. It forms part of Fort Lytton National Park. It was added to the Queensland Heritage Register on 22 September 2000.

== History ==
The Lytton Quarantine Station was established between 1913 and 1914. It accommodated newly arrived immigrants and persons considered to be at risk of causing infection to the general population. Situated at an isolated location at the mouth of the Brisbane River, the station illustrates early-20th-century attitudes to quarantine practices and the provision of quarantine facilities. It was important as a part of a continuum of sites in and adjacent to Moreton Bay used for quarantine purposes since 1844.

There were no human quarantine facilities at Moreton Bay during the penal era (1824–42), as all immigration came via Sydney. Following the opening of the district to free settlement in February 1842, a quarantine station was formed in 1844 at Dunwich, on Stradbroke Island, at the site of a former goods transfer depot established by convicts in the late 1820s. From 1864, Dunwich served as both quarantine station and benevolent asylum. The quarantine station was relocated briefly to St Helena Island in Moreton Bay between 1866 and 1867, but was soon returned to Dunwich. From 1874 to 1915 Peel Island in Moreton Bay served as Brisbane's human quarantine station.

The Lytton site, just south of Fort Lytton at the mouth of the Brisbane River, had a variety of uses prior to the establishment of the Quarantine Station in the early 20th century, occupying a former customs reserve (established 1858–59), sections of the early township of Lytton (surveyed in 1859), and an animal quarantine facility (established 1889).

The history of the Lytton district is closely aligned to the establishment of the Port of Moreton Bay at Brisbane Town, on the Brisbane River, during the 1840s and 1850s; the Port displaced much traffic from Cleveland. Moreton Bay was proclaimed a Port of Entry, with the facilities to collect customs, in June 1846. Brisbane was declared a warehousing port in 1849 and a Customs House was erected there in 1850.

In 1857 the New South Wales colonial government began to investigate the suitability of establishing a customs station at the south head of the Brisbane River (present-day Lytton). In August 1857, surveyor James Warner completed a preliminary survey of a site for a village, which was approved in November 1858, and in December 1858 tenders were called for the construction of a Customs Station nearby on the river.

In February 1859 Warner officially surveyed sections 1 to 13 of the village of Lytton, as well as sites for a customs landing place and a signal station. From 1 July 1859 a Tide Surveyor was stationed at Lytton. His job was to meet and board all ships entering the harbour to prevent the evasion of customs duties. He was assisted by a coxswain and four boatmen.

Following separation from New South Wales in December 1859, the Queensland government maintained Lytton's role as the customs entry to the Port of Moreton Bay. From c. 1864 Water Police-cum-Customs Officers were stationed on the gaol hulk Proserpine at the mouth of the Brisbane River. The Sub-inspector of the Water Police, based at the Lytton Customs Reserve, was also appointed as a health officer, and inspected all vessels entering the port.

Early buildings and structures associated with the Lytton Customs Station included: customs station (1858–9); electric telegraph station (1861); pilots' houses and sheds (1862); boatman's cottage (1863); boat slip (1863); health officer's house (1865); Lytton Wharf (1866); and additional boatmen's quarters (1872).

Some sections of Lytton township were alienated between 1860 and 1863, mostly by Brisbane speculators who anticipated the development of wharf facilities at Lytton. Few private buildings were erected there. The Crown and Anchor Hotel operated at Lytton briefly in 1865–66, when a government wharf adjacent to the Customs Reserve was built in 1866 to tranship railway stores and plant for construction of the Southern and Western Railway. From 1878 until c. 1905 the Lytton Hotel served local farmers and a military presence. Lytton State School was established c. 1882. In general, the district remained agricultural.

Sir George Bowen, on completion of his term as Governor and departure from Moreton Bay on 4 January 1868, officially named and designated Lytton as Brisbane's port.

In 1877, Lytton was identified as the site for a defence fortification to guard the mouth of the Brisbane River. In 1880–82 Fort Lytton was constructed adjacent to and north of the Customs Reserve.

In the 1880s, colonial concern with the quarantine of imported animals led to the June 1889 proclamation of a small Reserve for Quarantine Purposes at Lytton (Reserve 230, 1 acre 3 roods 29 perches (0.78 ha)), on the river adjacent to the Lytton Town Reserve and south of the Customs Reserve. Its location suggests it was for maritime quarantine. By May 1890 builders John Petrie & Son had completed a cottage, stables and forage room on the Lytton Quarantine Reserve, and in 1893, dog kennels were constructed. In April 1894, in anticipation of an expected influx of imported animals following the lifting of restrictions on stock imports, an extension of 2 acres (0.81 ha) 2 roods (22,000 sq ft; 2,000 m^{2}) to the Reserve for Quarantine Purposes at Lytton was proclaimed as Reserve 231. This extension occupied the southern half of the Customs Reserve. In 1891 and 1900, much of Lytton township was resumed for military purposes, with part of the 1900 resumption allocated to the Animal Quarantine Station. Several existing residences were used for customs personnel and others were removed from the site in the early 20th century.

Following the formation of the Commonwealth of Australia in 1901, quarantine became a federal responsibility under the Commonwealth Quarantine Act 1908. From 1908 to 1911, the Queensland Commissioner of Public Health (a position created under Queensland's Health Act of 1900) performed the duties of quarantine officer for the Commonwealth. In 1910 Dr John Simeon Colebrook Elkington was appointed to this position, and in the following three years established Queensland's public health infrastructure, and oversaw the administration and implementation of State and Commonwealth quarantine practices. In 1922 Elkington wrote a text on quarantine procedures for the Commonwealth, which not only governed quarantine practice in Australia but was adopted as the model in at least three other countries.

In January 1912, the administration of quarantine facilities and practices in Queensland was transferred wholly to the Federal Quarantine Bureau. In December 1913, Elkington resigned his State position and joined the Commonwealth Health Service in Brisbane, overseeing the establishment of the quarantine facility at Lytton.

The establishment of a human quarantine station at Lytton was made practicable following the widening and deepening of the channel through the bar at the mouth of the Brisbane River, completed in 1911. This permitted deep-draught, ocean-going vessels to enter the Brisbane River. Construction of the Lytton Quarantine Station was undertaken by the Queensland Department of Works, financed by a Commonwealth loan, and approved by the Commonwealth Department of Home Affairs. Tenders were called in June 1913 for the construction of an administration building, isolation hospital, observation block, attendant's quarters, domestic quarters and stores, with the contract let to Lyons and Paton with a price of £5,153. The quarantine buildings were erected on the north eastern part of the reserve (now a vacant site, part of which is incorporated within Fort Lytton National Park, and part on freehold land owned by Caltex Refineries (Qld) Ltd). It is possible that some of the buildings associated with the isolation hospital established at Colmslie in the early 1900s were relocated to the Lytton Quarantine Reserve at this time. In 1914, tenders were called for a laundry, meat store, incinerating shed, footpath and tramway/trolley lines.

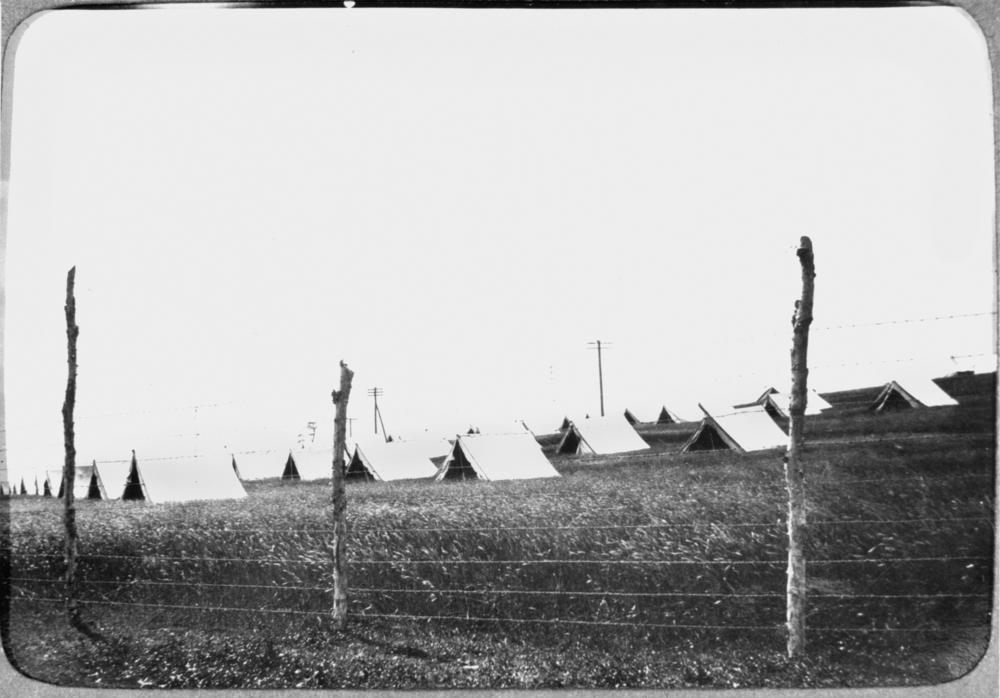
Tents erected at the Lytton Quarantine Camp, 1919

The quarantine station buildings were timber-framed and timber-clad with corrugated iron roofs and elevated on low concrete stumps. The wards were segregated with first, second and third class facilities (similar to arrangements on board ship). Some wards were mosquito-proofed, but most were not. At various times the quarantine station buildings also provided accommodation for persons stationed at adjacent Fort Lytton. The fort also played a role in the function of the quarantine station, controlling ships attempting to enter the Brisbane River without appropriate health clearances. In 1919 the world-wide outbreak of Spanish Influenza which followed the end of the First World War was delayed in Brisbane by some three months, following a strict quarantine at Lytton of personnel returning on troop ships.

During Elkington's era, a venereal diseases hospital was established on the southern portion of the Lytton Quarantine Reserve, adjacent to South Street. This area is now owned by Caltex Refineries (Qld) Ltd.

By 1928, the Lytton Quarantine Station facilities had been extended and enhanced. Vessels were met at the river mouth by the Health Authorities who boarded each ship (two launches were kept at Lytton) and inspected all goods and personnel on board. Suspect people and goods were landed at Lytton for fumigation and isolation. Jetty facilities permitted passengers to disembark on foot and a crane was provided for conveying sick passengers, luggage and stores to shore. A tram line ran from the jetty to the reception house. A permanent staff of a foreman assistant, two engine-drivers, a coxswain and four assistants was employed to maintain the facilities and attend to non-human quarantine, which included disinfection of luggage and materials using a steam disinfector (autoclave) with attachments for cyanide or formaldehyde gas. A bathing block permitted 10 cabin passengers and 20 crew, third class or deck passengers to bathe simultaneously. Separate accommodation in tents or troop huts had been established for Asiatics, with separate kitchen, dining-room, shelter shed, lavatory and bath blocks. Lighting was supplied from kerosene lamps. A water carriage sewerage system discharged directly into the river, with a chlorination chamber available for disinfection of sewerage as necessary. The medical officer's and foreman assistant's quarters were connected to the city telephone service and internal telephones served most of the principal buildings. A cemetery was located within the grounds. The Lytton facility functioned as a human quarantine station until the early 1980s, by which time the decision had been made to phase out human quarantine services. Arrangements were made for Kenmore Repatriation Hospital to provide observation facilities in the event that they were required, and in 1982 the Lytton facility reverted to its earlier role as an animal quarantine station, re-designated the Lytton Quarantine Complex and Animal Detention Centre. Facilities comprised a launch jetty, workshop, inflammable store, guinea pig area, imports treatment laboratory, utility buildings area, offices, stores, and animal quarantine detention facilities. In addition to its role as an animal quarantine centre, Lytton served as a communications centre, a base for south side shipping clearance and inspection, a facility for dealing with quarantine treatment and detention of materials, a training area and a depot for stores. Many of the buildings associated with the human quarantine station at Lytton were removed after the 1982 closure, some relocated to sites in the Lytton and Wynnum districts.

By the late 1980s the Lytton facility had closed completely. In 1988 management of part of the site and buildings, including the quarantine station jetty, was taken over by the Department of Environment, Conservation and Tourism, through the Queensland Parks and Wildlife Service, associated with the administration of adjacent Fort Lytton, which was declared an Historic National Park in 1990. The building currently used by the Queensland Parks and Wildlife Service as the administration centre for Fort Lytton, was relocated c. 1982 from elsewhere on the former quarantine station reserve, where it once functioned as the doctor's quarters. In 1999, that part of the former Lytton Quarantine Station site managed by the Queensland Parks and Wildlife Service was incorporated into Fort Lytton National Park.

The remainder of the former Lytton Quarantine Station site was transferred to the owners of the adjacent oil refinery (now Caltex Refineries (Qld) Ltd) in the late 1980s. No buildings associated with the quarantine station remain on this freehold land, but archaeological evidence of past human activity on the site was identified in a 1994 historical and archaeological survey of the former Lytton Quarantine Station, prepared for the Office of the Co-ordinator-General, Queensland. Although there has been little development of the freehold part of the site to date, for the purposes of this entry in the Queensland Heritage Register, the listing boundary is restricted to that part of the former Lytton Quarantine Station now incorporated within Fort Lytton National Park, at the northern end of the site, which contains a number of extant buildings and structures associated with the functioning of the site as a quarantine station. This does not in any way detract from the significance of the remainder of the site, which remains important for its association with early land use in the Lytton district from at least the 1850s, for its association with the human quarantine facility established at Lytton in the early 20th century, for its potential to reveal archaeological evidence, and for contributing to the sense of isolation which was characteristic of the quarantine facility established here in the 1910s.

== Description ==
The former Lytton Quarantine Station is located on low, flat land adjacent to and south of Fort Lytton at the southern head of the mouth of the Brisbane River.

The principal structures and elements on that part of the former Lytton Quarantine Station now incorporated within Fort Lytton National Park, include: Jetty - constructed of timber planks bolted together and supported by wooden piles reinforced with concrete. It is associated with the earliest phase of the development of the quarantine station at Lytton, in the 1910s.

=== Reception House ===
The reception house is a small, timber-framed, weatherboard-clad building with fibrous-cement sheeting and battening in the gabled ends. It has a corrugated iron roof and a verandah at the north end of the building which is constructed over tramway tracks that once linked the quarantine complex to the jetty to the west. The interior has been altered to accommodate offices, but the building remains substantially intact. It is associated with the earliest phase of the development of the quarantine station at Lytton, in the 1910s.

=== Tram/trolley bridge foundations ===
The tram/trolley bridge foundations comprise pairs of steel reinforced concrete footings set 2 metres (6 ft 7 in) apart, leading west from the Reception House toward the jetty. In some places wooden sleepers are visible, but the majority of the decking and all the rails are missing. This element is associated with the earliest phase of the development of the quarantine station at Lytton, in the 1910s.

=== Bath House ===
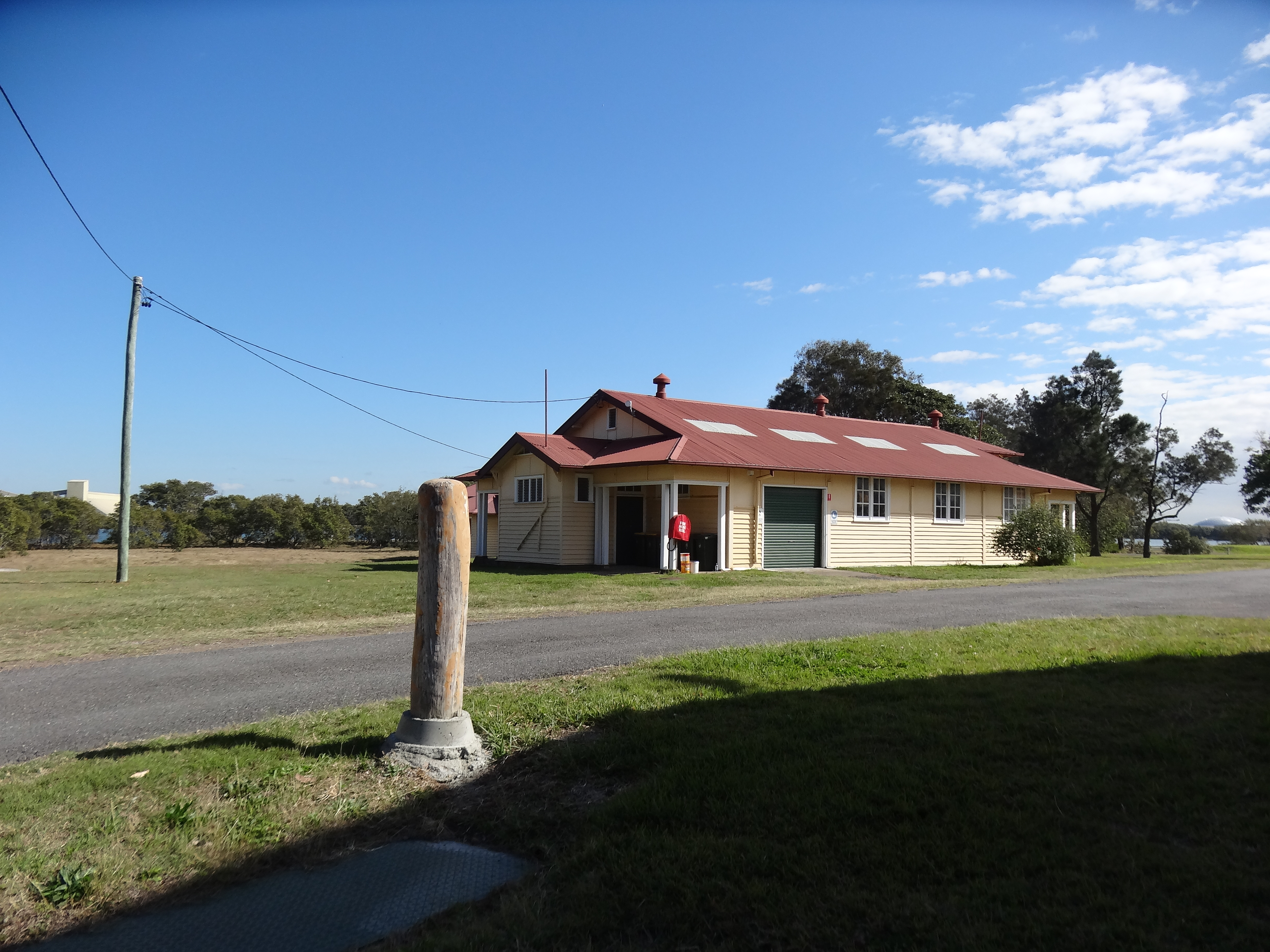
Bath House at Lytton Quarantine Station

The bath house is a large, rectangular, timber-framed, building with weatherboard-cladding to above sill height, above which is fibrous-cement sheeting and battening. It has a corrugated iron roof with ventilators along the ridge, and rests on a concrete slab. No evidence of services such as shower fittings, etc. remains, but the original interior layout is still discernible and the upper level observation post, at the north end of the building, is intact. Two square brick-lined drainage traps (620 by 620 millimetres (24 in × 24 in)) are located on the eastern side of the shower block. The building is associated with the earliest phase of the development of the quarantine station at Lytton, in the 1910s.

=== Boiler House ===
The boiler house is a tall, rectangular brick building with engaged piers, corrugated iron roof, substantial external chimney stack and external drains, with boilers and associated fittings internally. The whole is remarkable intact, and is associated with the earliest phase of the development of the quarantine station at Lytton, in the 1910s.

=== Fuel Shed ===
The fuel shed is a small, later, timber-framed, weatherboard-clad structure with a low-pitched corrugated iron roof, adjacent to the eastern end of the boiler room.

=== Disinfecting block ===
The disinfecting block is a large, rectangular, timber-framed, building with weatherboard-cladding to above sill height, above which is fibrous-cement sheeting and battening. It has a corrugated iron roof and rests on a concrete slab. The internal autoclave and associated fittings are in-situ, along with trolley track and trolleys. Trolley or tram lines run west out of the centre of the western end of the building, toward the jetty. An overhead pipeline from the boiler house to the south side of the disinfecting block attaches to the autoclave. The building is remarkably intact, and is associated with the earliest phase of the development of the quarantine station at Lytton, in the 1910s.

=== Laundry Block ===
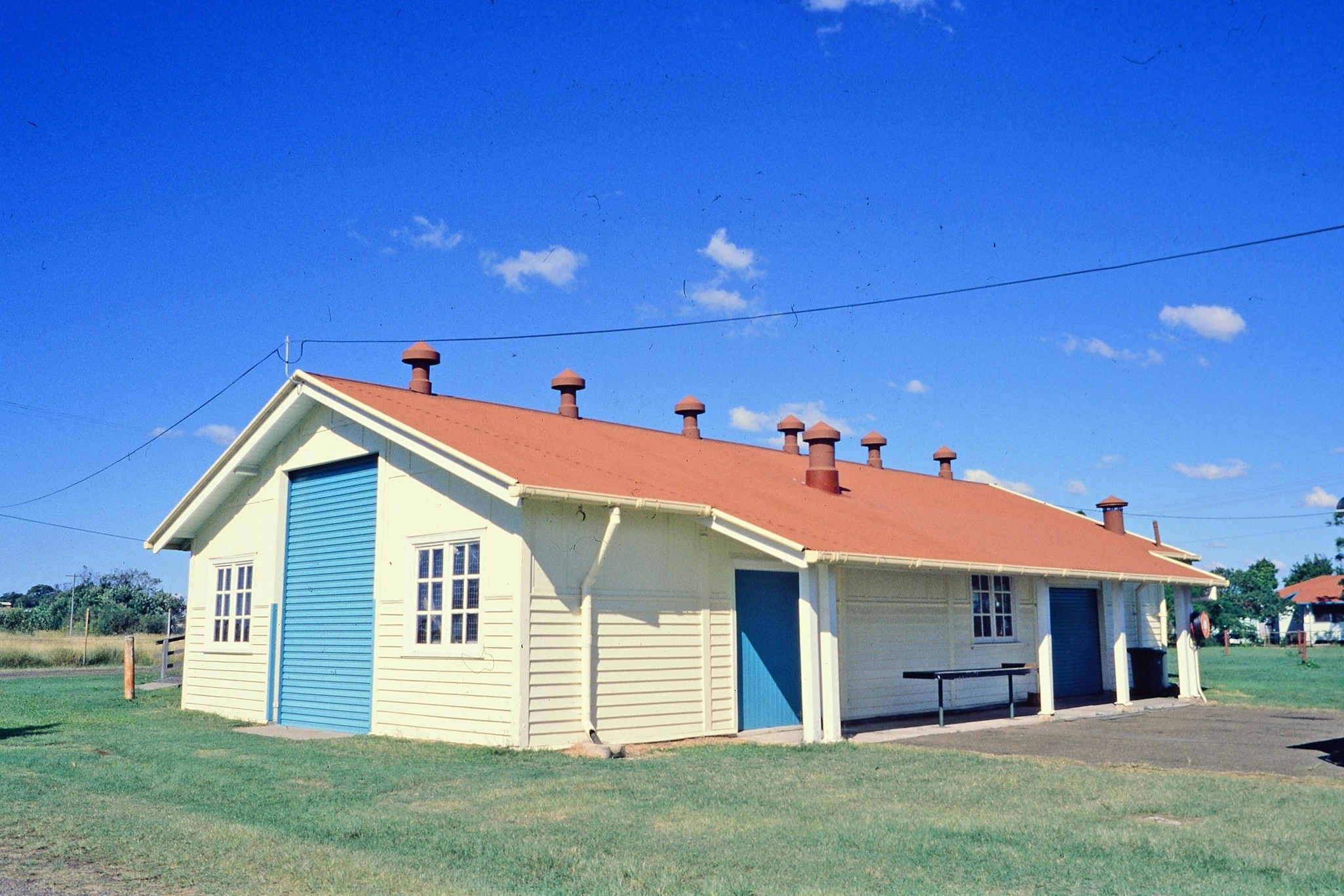
Laundry Block at Lytton Quarantine Station

The laundry block is a rectangular, timber-framed, building with weatherboard-cladding to above sill height, above which is fibrous-cement sheeting and battening. It has a corrugated iron gabled roof with iron ventilators along the ridge and on the west side of the roof. The building rests on a concrete slab, and has a verandah over a concrete pathway along part of the western side of the building. There is a later, tall metal roller door at the north end of the building, but the remaining doors and fenestration appear to be original. Concrete footings associated with former tank stands are evident on the east side of the building. The building is remarkably intact, and is associated with the earliest phase of the development of the quarantine station at Lytton, in the 1910s. Enclosed laundry yard - the yard area to the east and south of the laundry block has a concrete retaining wall approximately 150 millimetres (5.9 in) high and 150 millimetres (5.9 in) wide. The west and east sides of the yard are bounded by round metal posts capped with concrete while the south side is defined by tram/trolley rails set vertically as posts (1,500 millimetres (59 in) high). There is an open concrete drain along the eastern side of the yard, inside the fence posts. The yard contains 12 square wooden posts approximately 2 metres (6 ft 7 in) in height, which are likely to have supported clothes lines. A service inspection hatch is located centrally in the southern section of the yard. This has a 1 by 1 metre (3 ft 3 in × 3 ft 3 in) concrete housing with a 600 by 600 millimetres (24 in × 24 in) steel lid with embossed cross-hatching and the lettering "Harvey & Son". A block of late 20th century relocatable toilets is also sited in this yard. Despite this, the yard remains substantially intact, and is associated with the earliest phase of the development of the quarantine station at Lytton, in the 1910s.

=== Two launchmen's cottages ===
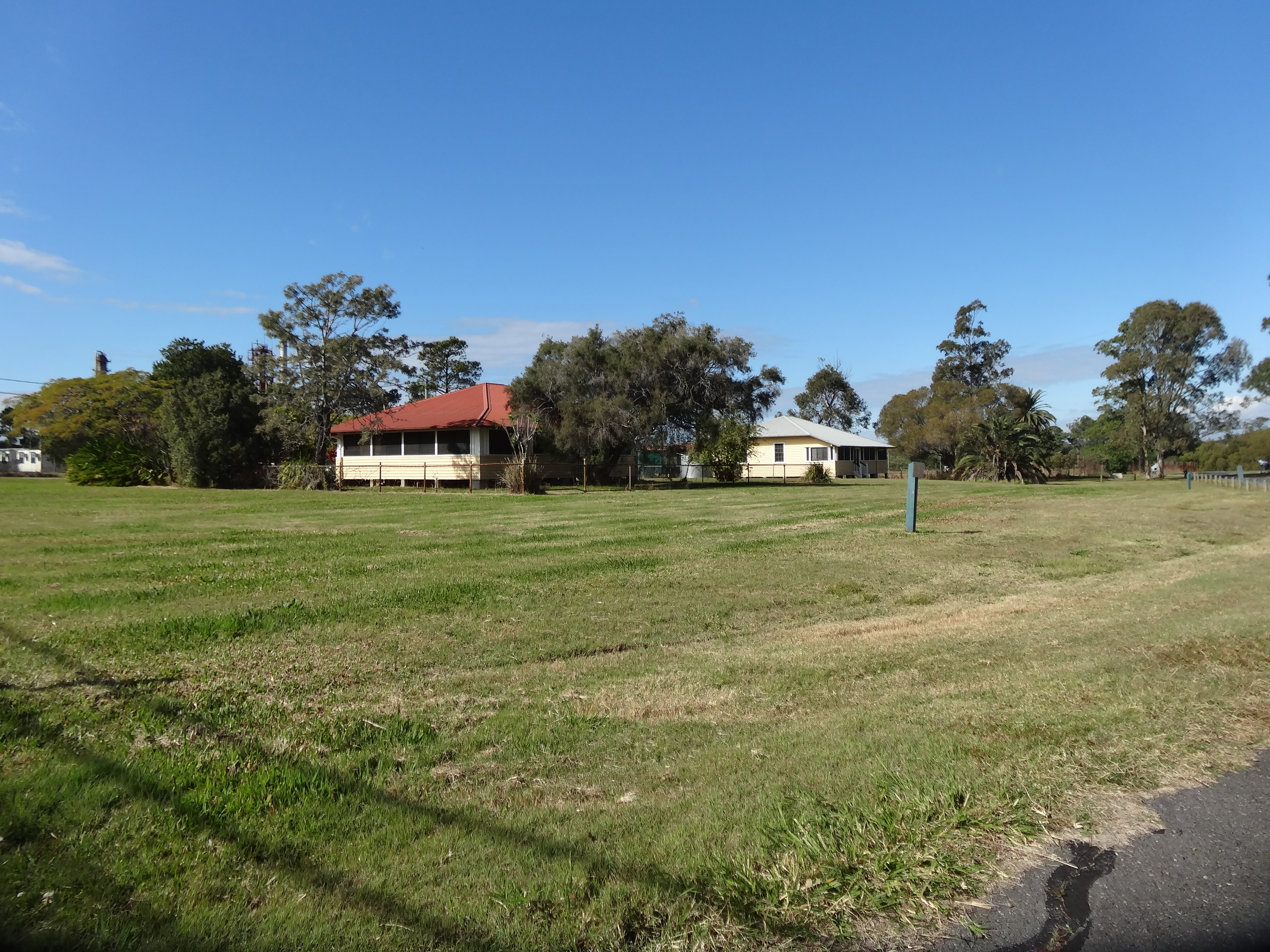
Launchmen's cottages at Lytton Quarantine Station

The two timber-framed, weatherboard clad launchmen's cottages are located along the eastern boundary of that part of the former Lytton Quarantine Station which has been incorporated into Fort Lytton National Park, south of the laundry and laundry yard. Originally there were three cottages, but the middle house has been removed. The two remaining houses have corrugated iron roofs and rest on low concrete piers. Although no interior inspection has been made, these houses appear to be reasonably intact. They are associated with the earliest phase of the development of the quarantine station at Lytton, in the 1910s.

=== Doctor's Quarters ===
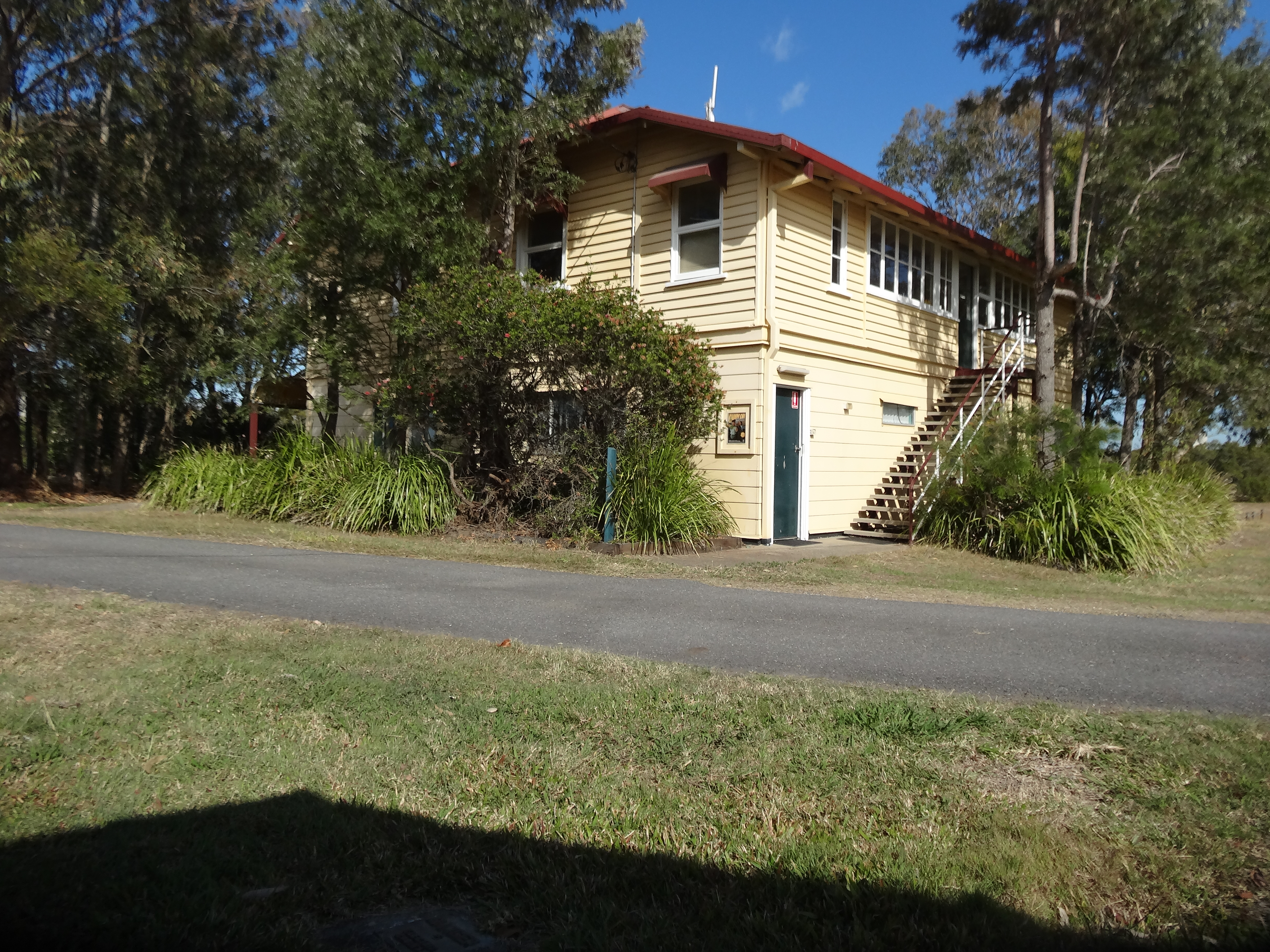
Doctor's Quarters Block at Lytton Quarantine Station

The doctor's quarters is a two-storeyed building currently functioning as the administration centre for Fort Lytton National Park. It was initially a single-storeyed, timber-framed, weatherboard-clad house which has been relocated from elsewhere on the site to its present position south of the Bath House, raised, to create a ground floor which is enclosed with fibrous-cement planking. Although no longer in situ, the place was associated with the earliest phase of the development of the quarantine station at Lytton, in the 1910s.

=== Workshop ===
The workshop is a small, rectangular, brick structure, resting on a concrete slab. It has a corrugated iron roof which is lined with timber boards. Internally, exposed roof trusses have been cut and braced to provide higher clearance for machinery. Outside, along the eastern side of the building is a concrete slab and seven pairs of concrete piers in ramp-like formation. On the western side of the building is This structure appears to correspond with a building marked "workshop" identified on a 1918 plan of the site. It now functions as a machinery store.

=== Sewerage Treatment Plant ===
At the far southwest of the site is a small, early sewerage treatment facility 14.8 metres (49 ft) long and 5.5 metres (18 ft) wide. It is of concrete construction, and has a central rectangular wire mesh cage filled with coarse rubble which possibly functioned as primary filtration of effluent. The plant remains substantially intact, and is associated with the earliest phase of the development of the quarantine station at Lytton, in the 1910s.

=== Grounds and surrounds ===
Apart from the relocation of the former Doctor's Quarters to the northwestern end of the site, the surviving buildings and other structural and archaeological elements maintain their original spatial relationship. The surrounding grounds are mostly grassed, with a new bitumen road, which leads to the present entrance to Fort Lytton, established west of the original metalled roadway into the quarantine station. There are a number of mature, though not large, trees, at the southern end of the site, associated with the former quarantine station.

At the north east end of the site is an unoccupied block, fenced off, and formerly the site of the administrative building, attendant's quarters, stores, isolation hospital and observation block, associated with the establishment of the Lytton Quarantine Station in 1913–14. All of these buildings have been removed from the site, but a number of archaeological elements associated with the quarantine station have been identified. These include the concrete foundation slab and some wall remnants of the former Laboratory Building/Morgue at the far eastern end of the site; the concrete foundation slab of a building marked "laundry" on a 1918 plan, at the western side of the site; the concrete foundation slab of a small building identified as "Receiving Shed" on a 1918 plan, at the northern end of the site; and elements of the early drainage system associated with the former Lytton Quarantine Station.

The Lytton Quarantine Station extended a considerable distance to the south of what is now Fort Lytton National Park, and included a venereal diseases hospital and animal quarantine facilities. The 1994 archaeological survey of all 31 hectares (77 acres) of the site identified 237 features associated with the historic use of the site from at least the 1910s. That part of the former Lytton Quarantine Station not included within Fort Lytton National Park is not included within the listing boundary for the entry in the Queensland Heritage Register.

== Heritage listing ==
The Lytton Quarantine Stationwas listed on the Queensland Heritage Register on 22 September 2000 having satisfied the following criteria.

The place is important in demonstrating the evolution or pattern of Queensland's history.

The Lytton Quarantine Station and site is important in illustrating the evolution of Queensland's history, being associated with:

- the early establishment of Lytton township and district prior to Separation in 1859
- the early establishment of maritime customs and telegraph facilities in Queensland
- the provision of animal quarantine facilities in the late 19th century
- the provision of human quarantine facilities in the early 20th century

In particular, the place is important in illustrating the evolution of attitudes and approaches to the management of infectious diseases in Australia in the immediate post-Federation period. The place is also significant historically as part of a continuum of sites in and adjacent to Moreton Bay used for human quarantine purposes from 1844 to 1982.

The place demonstrates rare, uncommon or endangered aspects of Queensland's cultural heritage.

While only some of the Lytton buildings remain, the site still provides important, rare surviving evidence of early 20th century Australian quarantine stations.

The place has potential to yield information that will contribute to an understanding of Queensland's history.

The place has potential to yield historical archaeological information, especially with regard to the location of the burial ground associated with the human quarantine facility, the likely location of which was adjacent to the morgue at the northeast end of the site.

The place is important in demonstrating the principal characteristics of a particular class of cultural places.

The surviving quarantine buildings, being substantially intact and mostly in situ, are important in illustrating the principal characteristics of an early 20th century Australian marine quarantine station, including the isolated location, building types (materials, forms, design, aesthetics, coherency and functions), spatial arrangements and grounds layout, and provision of services. Of the three early 20th century quarantine stations established by the Federal Government in Queensland (at Thursday Island, Cape Pallarenda (Townsville) and Lytton (Brisbane)), the Lytton facility was the first and the largest.

The place is important because of its aesthetic significance.

Appropriate interpretation of the surviving buildings, structures and other elements at the northern end of the former Lytton Quarantine Station has the potential to graphically and physically illustrate the experience of the quarantine process which many immigrants to Australia encountered.

The place has a strong or special association with a particular community or cultural group for social, cultural or spiritual reasons.

The place has considerable social significance, being associated with the reception of immigrants in Queensland for nearly 70 years. Being quarantined at Lytton was often an immigrant's first experience of life in Queensland and in Australia.

The place has a special association with the life or work of a particular person, group or organisation of importance in Queensland's history.

The place has a special association with the work of Dr JSC Elkington, who was responsible for the design and development of Queensland's early 20th century public health infrastructure, and who became an authority on quarantine practice in post-Federation Australia. The Lytton Quarantine Station remains illustrative of his work.

== See also ==
- List of tramways in Queensland
