= Elkington (surname) =

Elkington is a surname. Notable people with the surname include:

- Audrey Elkington (born 1957), English priest, Archdeacon of Bodmin
- George Elkington (1801–1865), English businessman and electroplating pioneer
- Henry Elkington (1890–1963), Australian rules footballer
- Jodi Elkington (born 1993), Australian sprinter
- John Elkington (business author) (born 1949), English businessman and author
- John Elkington (British Army officer) (1830–1889), British Army general, Lieutenant Governor of Guernsey
- John Simeon Colebrook Elkington (1871–1955), Australian public health advocate
- Joseph Elkington (1740–1806), English agriculturalist
- Lilian Elkington (1900–1969), English pianist and composer
- Steve Elkington (born 1962), Australian golfer
- Tim Elkington (1920–2019), English Royal Air Force officer
