= John Simeon Colebrook Elkington =

Australian public health advocate (1871–1955)

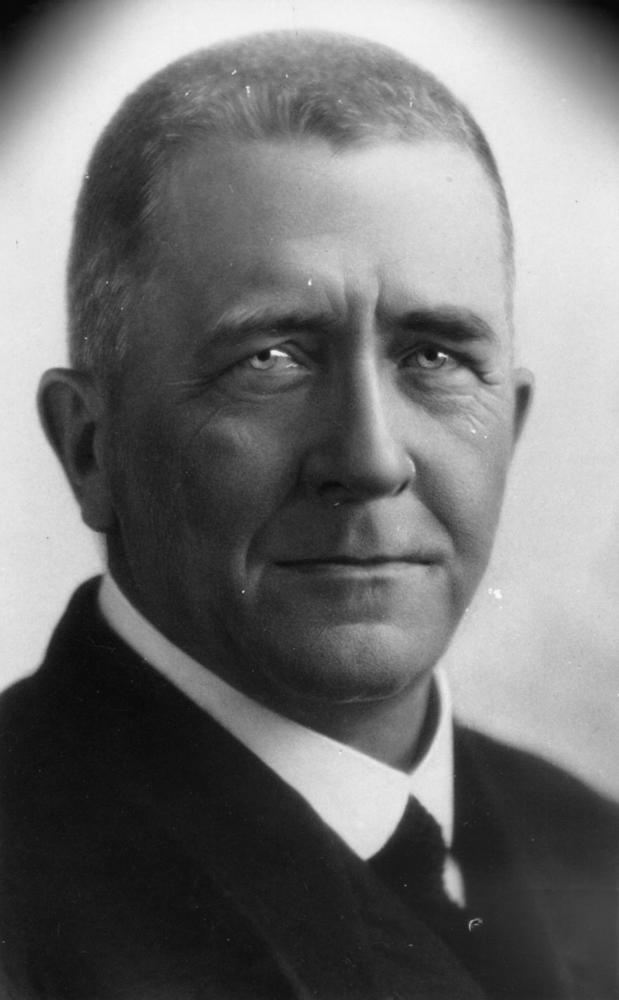

John Simeon Colebrook Elkington (29 September 1871 – 8 March 1955) was an Australian public health advocate. He pioneered programs for checking the health of schoolchildren and the federal quarantine service. He also researched tropical medicine, an important issue in northern Australia.

== Early life and education ==
Elkington was born on 29 September 1871, at Castlemaine, Victoria, to John Simeon Elkington and his wife Helen Mary (née Guilfoyle).

From 1890, Elkington studied medicine at the University of Melbourne but failed in his examinations. He later qualified as a licentiate at Edinburgh and Glasgow in 1896.

== Career ==
In 1903, Elkington was asked to come to Launceston, Tasmania to advise on how to deal with an outbreak of smallpox and how to prevent it spreading to other areas. Elkington recommended mass vaccination.

In 1904, Elkington made a study of school hygiene factors for the Tasmanian Government, resulting in new design rules for ventilation, lighting and "sanitary accommodation" in schools. On his recommendation, a program of regular health inspections of school pupils was established to ensure normal physical development was occurring and to organise medical intervention when required; teachers were also trained to detect and report possible health defects.

Following the formation of the Commonwealth of Australia in 1901, quarantine became a federal responsibility under the Commonwealth Quarantine Act 1908. From 1908 to 1911, the Queensland Commissioner of Public Health (a position created under Queensland's Health Act of 1900) performed the duties of quarantine officer for the Commonwealth. In 1910, Elkington was appointed to this position, and in the following three years established Queensland's public health infrastructure, and oversaw the administration and implementation of State and Commonwealth quarantine practices.

In January 1912, the administration of quarantine facilities and practices in Queensland was transferred wholly to the Federal Quarantine Bureau. In December 1913, Elkington resigned his State position and joined the Commonwealth Health Service in Brisbane, overseeing the establishment of the heritage-listed Lytton Quarantine Station at the mouth of the Brisbane River. Elkington became the authority on quarantine practice in post-Federation Australia. In 1922, Elkington wrote a text on quarantine procedures for the Commonwealth, which not only governed quarantine practice in Australia but was adopted as the model in at least three other countries.

In 1917, Elkington, then Director of the Division of Tropical Hygiene, Commonwealth Department of Health, was concerned about health and hygiene of the growing population of Croydon, Queensland and contemplated conducting a statistical and social survey of the town, which did not eventuate. However, his interest in sociological surveys of gathering social and economic details on a population later developed into the 1924 Sociological Survey of White Women conducted from the Institute of Tropical Medicine in Townsville.

In the 1920s, with other medical colleagues, he was instrumental in establishing a number of Commonwealth health laboratories to protect Australia against epidemic diseases. Laboratories were established in Bendigo, Toowoomba, Townsville within Australia and also Rabaul in Papua New Guinea.

== Later life ==
Elkington died on 8 March 1955, aged 83, at Mooloolaba.
