= Allendale railway station =

Disused railway station in Northumberland, England

Coordinates: 54.908°N 2.265°W

Allendale
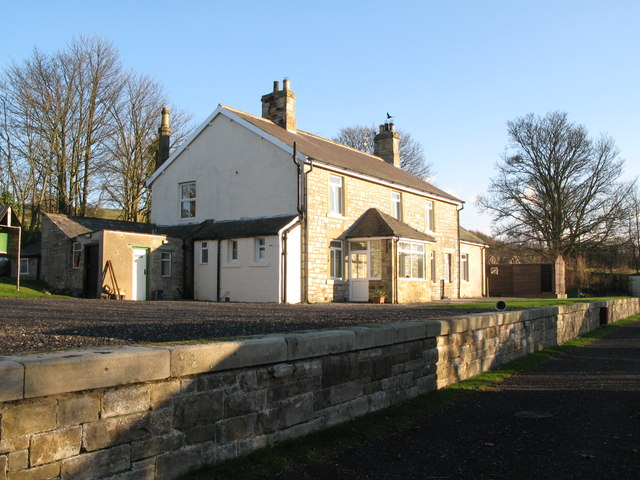

General information
- Location: Allendale, Northumberland; England
- Platforms: 1

Other information
- Status: Disused

History
- Original company: Hexham and Allendale Railway
- Pre-grouping: North Eastern Railway
- Post-grouping: London and North Eastern Railway

Key dates
- 13 January 1868: opened for goods
- 1 March 1869: Station opened as Catton Road
- 1 May 1898: Station renamed Allendale
- 22 September 1930: Station closed for passengers
- 20 November 1950: Station closed for freight
Location

Allendale railway station was the terminus of the single track branch of the Hexham and Allendale Railway, in north east England. The line connected villages in the area to the railway network via a junction at Hexham.

== History ==
Authorised in 1865 the Hexham to Allendale Railway was opened in stages, first to Langley-on-Tyne in 1867, then to Allendale (then known as Catton Road) a mile short of the town in 1868. Built to carry freight, primarily the product of local lead mines, the line eventually opened to passengers. The passenger service was run by the North Eastern Railway who took over the line in July 1876. Passenger services were withdrawn in 1930 but freight services continued until 20 November 1950 when the line was abandoned.

Former Services

Preceding station	Disused railways	Following station
Staward Halt	London and North Eastern Railway; Hexham and Allendale Railway	Terminus

== Legacy ==
The station site and the first part of the track to Hexham were sold to the former station master. Today it is the location of the Allendale Caravan Park.
