= Thomas Elrington =

Thomas Elrington may refer to:

- Thomas Elrington (bishop) (1760–1835), bishop and provost of Trinity College, Dublin
- Thomas Elrington (actor) (1688–1732), English actor
- Thomas Elrington (MP) (1520–1566), Member of Parliament (MP) for Bramber, and for New Shoreham
