= Henry Elkington =

Australian rules footballer

Personal information
- Full name: Henry Smith Elkington
- Born: 22 February 1890; Geelong, Victoria
- Died: 5 May 1963 (aged 73); Richmond, Victoria

Playing career^{1}
Years	Club	Games (Goals)
1914	Essendon	1 (0)
- ^{1} Playing statistics correct to the end of 1914.

Henry Smith Elkington (22 February 1890 – 5 May 1963) was an Australian rules footballer who played with Essendon in the Victorian Football League (VFL).
