= Northamptonshire Uplands =

English National Character Area

- National Character Area
- Location: Northamptonshire, Warwickshire, Oxfordshire, Leicestershire (United Kingdom)
- Max. elevation: Arbury Hill, 225m

The Northamptonshire Uplands are an English National Character Area that lie predominantly in the western half of the district of West Northamptonshire, with a small area of the NCA extending into Cherwell District, Oxfordshire, Harborough District, Leicestershire and Stratford-on-Avon District and the Borough of Rugby, both of which are part of Warwickshire.

== Extent ==
The NCA runs from the northern border of Northamptonshire and Leicestershire in a south westerly direction towards Banbury, roughly following the border between West Northamptonshire and Warwickshire, until reaching, and extending around 8 km into Oxfordshire.

It encompasses nearly all of the former Daventry District, as well as the western half of the former district of South Northamptonshire.

The main population centres within the uplands are Banbury and Daventry. The eastern suburbs of Rugby and northwestern suburbs of Northampton also both encroach on the uplands.

== Geology ==
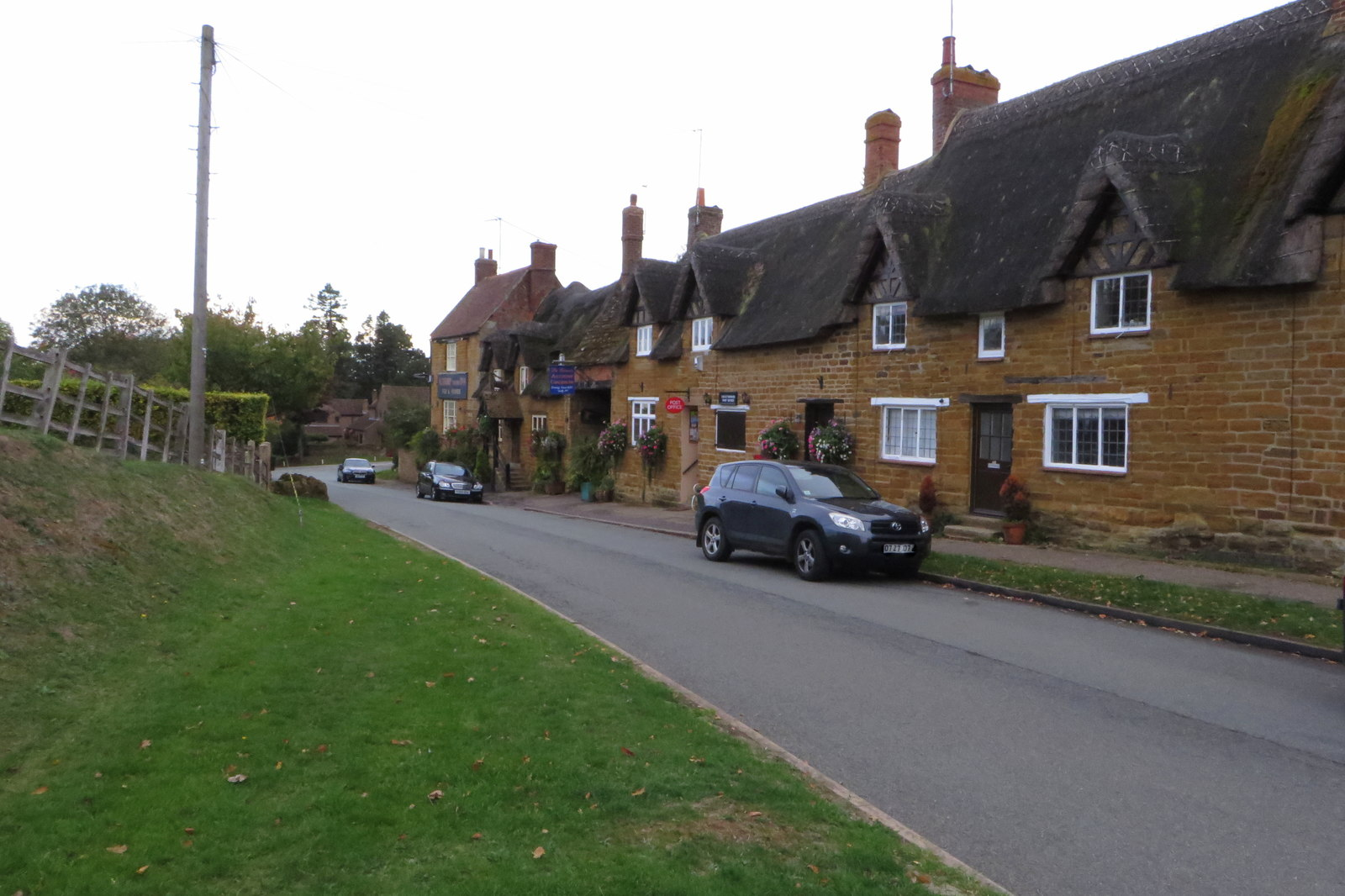
Sandstone has been used as a building material in the area since the Stone Age.

Much of the area lies on a mixed strata from the Jurassic Period when Limestone was deposited in the north of the area, with the east and the south of the district capping off the Limestone deposits with ironstone-rich sandstone.

Over time the weathering of these minerals by a previously formed ocean has given many of the rocks in the area a wide variety of distinctive colours.

Above the solid geology there is a mixture of clay like soil (till) and sand and rock (alluvium), which made early agricultural efforts difficult and restricted drainage to the rivers and streams in the region.

== Geography ==
=== Human geography ===
==== Transport ====
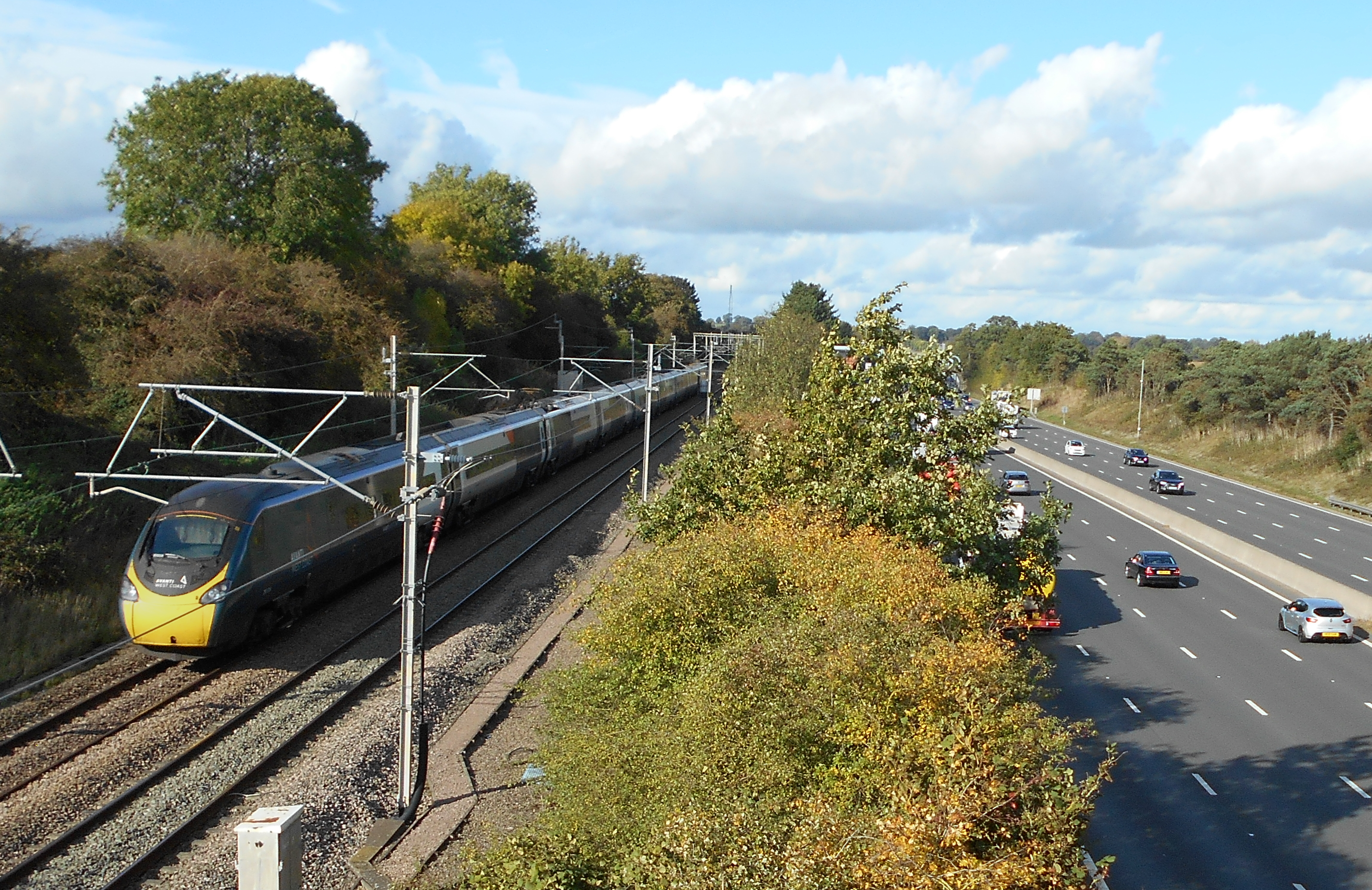
The Watford Gap forms an important transport corridor between the north and south parts of the Uplands

There are several major transport corridors which pass through the area. The M1 and M40 motorways pass through the uplands and link major population centres in England. The UK's shortest motorway, the M45 also passes through the Uplands.

The A5, A14 both pass through the area. The longest three digit A road in the UK, the A361, also passes through the uplands. Other important A roads in the area include the A428, the A422 and the A425.

=== Physical geography ===
==== Principal summits ====
Hills within the NCA with more than 30 metres of prominence are listed here.

| Rank | Hill | Elevation | Prominence | Grid reference |
|---|---|---|---|---|
| 1 | Arbury Hill | 224.3 m (736 ft) | 102.7 m | SP540587 |
| 2 | Big Hill | 224.3 m (736 ft) | 63 m | SP548612 |
| 3 | Sharman's Hill | 222.7 m (731 ft) | 43 m | SP539576 |
| 4 | Blackdown | 222 m (728 ft) | 47 m | SP513561 |
| 5 | Honey Hill | 214 m (702 ft) | 70 m | SP637768 |
| 6 | Oat Hill | 211 m (692 ft) | 79 m | SP407507 |
| 7 | Beacon Hill | 206.5 m (677 ft) | 56 m | SP489609 |
| 8 | Borough Hill | 201 m (659 ft) | 47 m | SP587620 |
| 9 | Newnham Hill | 201 m (659 ft) | 44 m | SP575608 |
| 10 | Naseby Hill | 197 m (646 ft) | 34 m | SP693784 |
| 11 | Hinton Hill | 196 m (643 ft) | 34 m | SP535543 |
| 12 | Badby Down | 196 m (643 ft) | 33 m | SP554582 |
| 13 | Fox Hill | 193.6 m (635 ft) | 31 m | SP569610 |
| 14 | Golden Hill | 192 m (630 ft) | 41 m | SP508521 |
| 15 | Preston Capes Hill | 189.3 m (621 ft) | 37 m | SP567545 |
| 16 | Berryhill | 187.6 m (615 ft) | 44.6 m | SP469549 |
| 17 | Thenford Hill | 187 m (614 ft) | 43 m | SP522443 |
| 18 | Upper Wardington Hill | 179.1 m (588 ft) | 34 m | SP503463 |
| 19 | Windmill Hill | 178 m (584 ft) | 36 m | SP433501 |
| 20 | Ashby Grange Hill | 177.2 m (581 ft) | 32 m | SP555679 |
| 21 | Crouch Hill | 170 m (558 ft) | 36 m | SP440392 |
| 22 | Napton Hill | 157.9 m (518 ft) | 31.6 m | SP459613 |
| 23 | Waydale Hill | 151 m (495 ft) | 39 m | SP654631 |

== Bibliography ==
- Mudd, Andrew (2008). Iron Age and Roman Settlement on the Northamptonshire Uplands. Heritage Publications. ISBN 9780955506208.
