= Cold Ashby =

Village in Northamptonshire, England

Coordinates: 52.3826°N 1.0391°W

- Location within Northamptonshire
- Population: 278 (2011)
- OS grid reference: SP6576
- Unitary authority: West Northamptonshire
- Ceremonial county: Northamptonshire
- Region: East Midlands
- Country: England
- Sovereign state: United Kingdom
- Post town: Northampton
- Postcode district: NN6
- Dialling code: 01604
- Police: Northamptonshire
- Fire: Northamptonshire
- Ambulance: East Midlands
- UK Parliament: Kettering

Cold Ashby is a village and civil parish in West Northamptonshire in England. At the time of the 2001 census, the parish's population was 255 people, increasing to 278 at the 2011 census.

The villages name means 'Ash-tree farm/settlement' or 'Aski's farm/settlement'. 'Cold' from its exposed situation.

Cold Ashby is surrounded by rolling farmland, and has a notable golf club. Its population is mainly commuters and their families, although farming is important to the local economy. The village has its own bowls and cricket clubs, and is within the catchment area of the Guilsborough schools. Lying on the 200 metres (656 ft) contour line Cold Ashby is said to be the highest village in Northamptonshire. The British Ordnance Survey's first trig point, the triangular post used by surveyors, was erected on 18 April 1936 near Cold Ashby. More than 11,000 of the posts were erected across Britain to enable surveyors to create maps accurate to within metres by measuring angles and using trigonometry to calculate distances between the pillars.
