= Hexham and Allendale Railway =

Disused railway line in Northumberland

Overview
- Status: Disused
- Locale: Northumberland
- Termini: Hexham; Allendale
- Former connections: Newcastle and Carlisle Railway (1867–1950)

Service
- Type: Heavy rail

History
- Commenced: 19 August 1867
- Completed: 1 March 1869
- Closed to passengers: 22 September 1930
- Closed to freight: 20 November 1950

Technical
- Line length: 12 1/4 miles (19.7 km)
- Number of tracks: Single track
- Track gauge: 4 ft 8 1/2 in (1,435 mm) standard gauge

The Hexham and Allendale Railway was a railway company formed in 1865 to build a branch line from the lead mining district of Allendale in Northumberland to a junction near Hexham on the Carlisle to Newcastle line. It opened to goods and mineral traffic in two stages from 1867, and to passengers in 1869.

The area was thinly populated apart from the lead mining and smelting settlements, and a slump in lead prices around the time of opening made the financial status of the line difficult, and it was not completed to its intended southern terminus of Allenheads.

The company was absorbed by the North Eastern Railway in 1876, and the passenger service was withdrawn in 1930; the line closed completely in 1950.

== First railways ==
The Newcastle and Carlisle Railway was built to connect the east and west coasts of northern England, but in its construction, priority was given to opening the section between Hexham and Blaydon. This was to give early access to the River Tyne for lead ore extracted in the area, considered to be the most lucrative potential traffic for the line. The Newcastle and Carlisle Railway was completed (from Carlisle to Gateshead) in 1837.

Much of the ore was extracted from hilly locations north and south of the N&CR main line, and for some time it was carted down to the N&CR at Hexham or Haydon Bridge for onward conveyance by train. This was an improvement on the previous arrangement, but it was not long before proposals for railway connections were put forward. As early as 1841 the Newcastle and Carlisle Railway considered a connection to Alston and Nenthead, high in the hills south of and above Haltwhistle. The Nenthead part of that was dropped, but the branch line from Alston to Haltwhistle was opened in two stages in 1851 and 1852.

A rival proposal to the N&CR Alston branch had been the Wear Valley Extension Railway, which was proposed in 1845 to build from Frosterley on the Wear Valley Railway to near Milton on the Newcastle and Carlisle Railway main line. Sponsored by the Stockton and Darlington Railway this was conceived as part of a future through main line route to Scotland. The terrain was very challenging, and attempts to keep to main line curvatures and gradients had to compromise with realistic earthworks. Opposition from the Earl of Carlisle, the major landowner in the area, resulted in the proposal being dropped in 1846.

Now in the same year the Newcastle and Carlisle Railway published their intention to build a branch to Allendale from Morralee, but they were unable to prepare timely and accurate survey documents for the line through difficult terrain and the plan was deferred; even the Alston branch, serving a greater concentration of the lead industry, was much delayed in opening..

The independently promoted Border Counties Railway ran north from Hexham, connecting mineral deposits to the main line as well as harbouring strategic plans to reach further, which it later achieved. The first part opened in 1858.

== Allendale ==
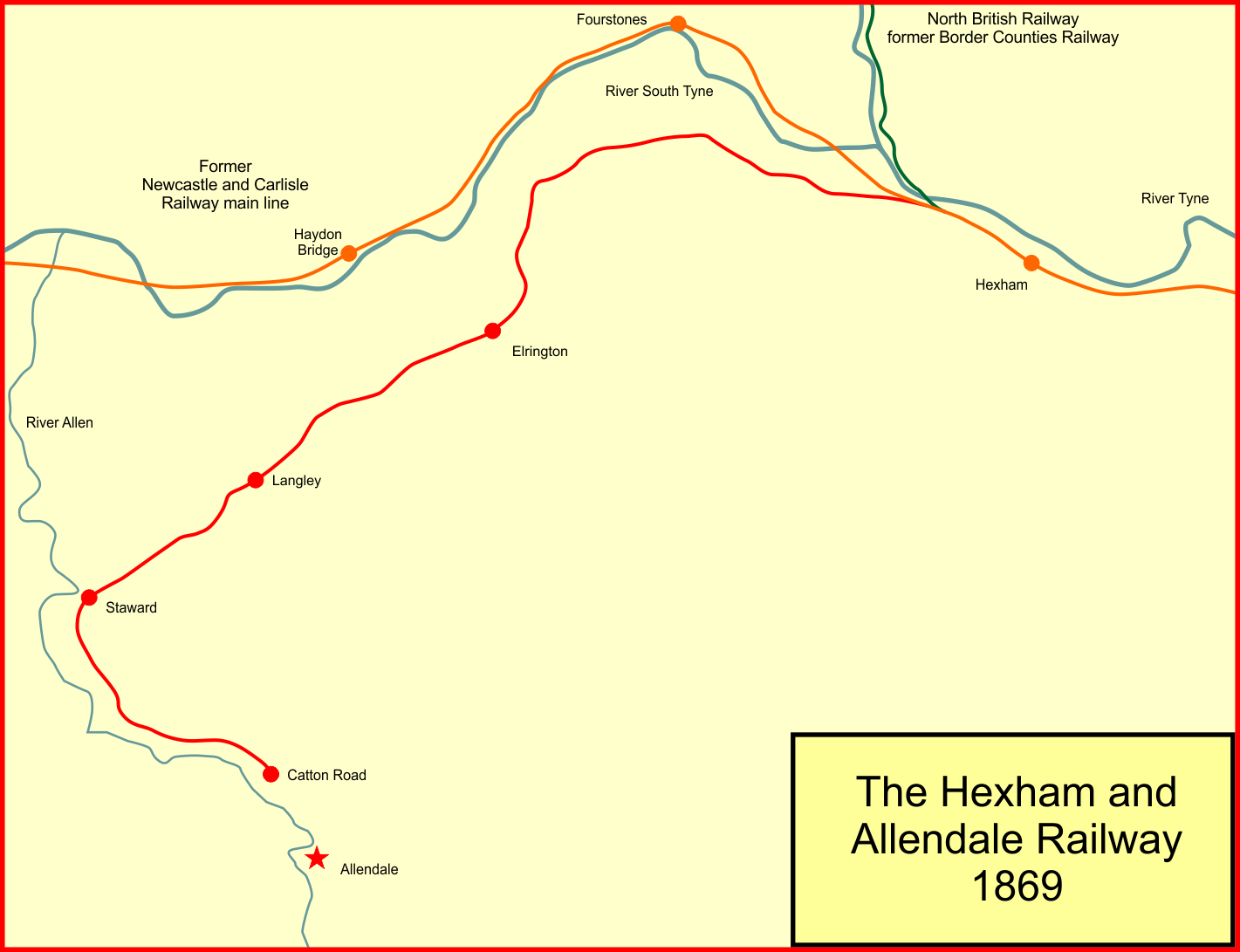
The Allendale branch

The Beaumont Lead Company was operating at Allendale, 12 miles east of Alston. The Alston branch was of no benefit to it, and it continued to convey its output by road down to Haydon Bridge on the Newcastle and Carlisle Railway, while its competitors now had the advantage of a railway connection. The company was owned by Wentworth Blackett Beaumont and on 31 August 1864 he chaired a meeting in Allendale to promote a locally financed railway to Hexham, on the N&CR. The Greenwich Hospital Estates, trading as the London Lead Company had a lead smelting plant at Langley, and had become major proprietors of smelting facilities in the area and they supported the scheme, being prepared to invest £10,000. Beaumont stated that he would invest £20,000.

Hexham and Allendale Railway Act 1865
- Act of Parliament
- Parliament of the United Kingdom
- Long title: An Act for authorizing the Construction of Railways in the County of Northumberland, to be called "The Hexham and Allendale Railway;" and for other Purposes.
- Citation: 28 & 29 Vict. c. lxxxvii

Dates
- Royal assent: 19 June 1865

Text of statute as originally enacted

The company's manager was Thomas J. Bewicke, and he arranged a survey; although a steep and continuous gradient of 1 in 40 was required there were no major engineering difficulties and no landowner opposition, and the North Eastern Railway was amenable to a junction being made with its main line. The line was to run from Hexham to Allendale, with a 7-mile extension to Allenheads. Parliamentary plans were deposited in November 1864; the bill was unopposed and the Hexham and Allendale Railway Act 1865 (28 & 29 Vict. c. lxxxvii) received royal assent on 19 June 1865.

Construction proceeded reasonably rapidly, although the deep embankment at Coastley Dene proved difficult to stabilise. The parliamentary plans had shown the junction with the Newcastle and Carlisle Railway at about 400 yards west of Border Counties Junction, where the BCR diverged. This was too far to control the junction to the Allendale from the Border Counties Junction signalbox, and a separate signalbox was inappropriate, so informal arrangements were made to make the junction close to the Border Counties Junction and within the control of that signalbox.

The company had difficult raising capital; the large subscriptions taken by Beaumont, the Greenwich Hospital and certain other principals with an interest in the line were not matched by individual subscriptions, and the decision was taken to stop construction about a mile short of Allendale, and not to proceed to Allenheads at all.

== Opening ==
The line was opened for mineral traffic between Border Counties Junction and Langley on 19 August 1867. The line was worked by the North Eastern Railway. The next section to Allendale was opened for goods and mineral traffic on 13 January 1868; the "temporary terminus" was named Catton Road. The junction at Border Counties was also a temporary arrangement, unsuitable for passenger operation, and the North Eastern Railway had undertaken to improve Hexham station but had not yet done so.

The Hexham and Allendale company paid for the use of the 1 1/2 miles of NER line into Hexham station, and for the use of Hexham station. The cost of a locomotive on the H&AR was three guineas a day, and the H&AR paid the crews’ wages, any locomotive repairs, and stores used.

On 2 February 1869 the Board of Trade Inspecting Officer visited the line to approve it for passenger operation, but he declined to do so because of deficiencies in the signalling; he also criticised the arrangements at the North Eastern Railway's Hexham station. Yolland visited again on 25 February 1869 and this time passed the line for passenger opening. Passenger trains ran from 1 March 1869; there were two services each way every weekday, with a third on Hexham market day, Tuesday.

At this time the world price of lead had slumped considerably, and the commercial viability of the lead works, and the business they brought to the line, declined. In fact the slump led to a collapse, and depopulation of the area followed rapidly, with serious consequences for the line. Allendale parish's population fell from 6,401 in 1861 to 5,397 by 1871. In 1881 it was down to 4,030. The collapse of the lead industry occurred from about 1880, most mines closing, and by 1886 the Allendale and Langley smelters had closed and the Beaumont lead concern had given-up its local interests entirely. Nonetheless it carried 240,000 passenger journeys during its independent existence.

Receipts for the half year to 30 June 1868 were:

- goods £697;
- minerals £331;
- livestock £2;
- parcels £2.

In 1876 the company sold its line to the North Eastern Railway, and its shareholders received about 60% of their investment, effective on 13 July 1876. Dividends had been paid on three occasions.

The line continued but the depopulation and industrial decline had an adverse effect on business. Nonetheless for many years there were two goods trains daily on the branch; milk was an exceptionally buoyant traffic.

The line was single, worked on the one engine in steam principle, intermediate sidings being served by ground frame connections released by the train staff.

== After 1923 ==
Following the Railways Act 1921, the North Eastern Railway was a constituent of the new London and North Eastern Railway (LNER), as part of the "grouping" of the main line railways of Great Britain, effective from 1 January 1923.

The new owner was unable to sustain the passenger service, and it was withdrawn from 22 September 1930.

After nationalisation of the railways on 1 January 1948 the line was under the control of British Railways. The residual goods service was unprofitable and the line closed completely in November 1950.

== Topography ==
The passenger service on the line started on 1 March 1869 and closed 22 September 1930. Station list:

- Border Counties Junction;
- Elrington;
- Langley;
- Staward;
- Catton Road; renamed Allendale 1 May 1898.

The line climbed steeply to a summit at Langley, 800 feet above sea level, and then descended to Staward, then falling gently to the terminus.
