= List of civil parishes in Northamptonshire =

This is a list of civil parishes in the ceremonial county of Northamptonshire, England. There are 275 civil parishes. Population figures are not available for some of the smallest parishes, and those created after 2011. The whole of the county is parished. Figures for population and area are from the 2011 census.

Name	Population	Area (hectares)	District		
Name	Population	Area (hectares)	Pre-1974	1974-2021	Current
Abthorpe	311	797.38	Towcester RD	South	West
Adstone			Towcester RD	South	West
Alderton			Towcester RD	South	West
Aldwincle	322	1167.09	Oundle & Thrapston RD	East	North
Althorp			Brixworth RD	Daventry	West
Apethorpe	160	721.61	Oundle & Thrapston RD	East	North
Arthingworth	231	710.33	Brixworth RD	Daventry	West
Ashby St Ledgers	173	782.20	Daventry RD	Daventry	West
Ashley	224	497.73	Kettering RD	Kettering	North
Ashton (North)	395	550.46	Oundle & Thrapston RD	East	North
Ashton (West)	219	748.71	Northampton RD	South	West
Aston le Walls	293	633.85	Brackley RD	South	West
Aynho	651	1033.61	Brackley RD	South	West
Badby	632	820.41	Daventry RD	Daventry	West
Barby	2,336	1402.79	Daventry RD	Daventry	West
Barnwell	369	1402.58	Oundle & Thrapston RD	East	North
Barton Seagrave	4,418	202.79	Kettering MB	Kettering	North
Benefield	339	2290.13	Oundle & Thrapston RD	East	North
Billing	8,457	225.94	Northampton RD	Northampton	West
Blakesley	508	967.47	Towcester RD	South	West
Blatherwycke			Oundle & Thrapston RD	East	North
Blisworth	1,785	761.15	Towcester RD	South	West
Boddington	744	1271.05	Brackley RD	South	West
Boughton	1,112	553.39	Brixworth RD	Daventry	West
Bozeat	2,052	1781.32	Wellingborough RD	Wellingborough	North
Brackley (town)	13,018	687.67	Brackley MB	South	West
Bradden	149	418.25	Towcester RD	South	West
Brafield on the Green	666	515.72	Northampton RD	South	West
Brampton Ash			Kettering RD	Kettering	North
Braunston	1,759	1318.26	Daventry RD	Daventry	West
Braybrooke	378	1172.11	Kettering RD	Kettering	North
Brigstock	1,357	2487.35	Oundle & Thrapston RD	East	North
Brington	496	1567.49	Brixworth RD	Daventry	West
Brixworth	5,228	1157.86	Brixworth RD	Daventry	West
Brockhall			Daventry RD	Daventry	West
Broughton	2,208	707.12	Kettering RD	Kettering	North
Bugbrooke	2,692	906.40	Northampton RD	South	West
Bulwick	171	932.70	Oundle & Thrapston RD	East	North
Burton Latimer (town)	7,449	1126.77	Burton Latimer UD	Kettering	North
Byfield	1,277	1116.03	Daventry RD	Daventry	West
Canons Ashby			Daventry RD	Daventry	West
Castle Ashby	111	802.31	Northampton RD	South	West
Catesby			Daventry RD	Daventry	West
Chacombe	659	698.50	Brackley RD	South	West
Charwelton	220	1716.71	Daventry RD	Daventry	West
Chelveston cum Caldecott	566	1209.90	Oundle & Thrapston RD	East	North
Chipping Warden & Edgcote	537	978.19	Brackley RD	South	West
Church with Chapel Brampton	808	982.40	Brixworth RD	Daventry	West
Clay Coton	271	2616.19	Daventry RD	Daventry	West
Clipston	643	1171.63	Brixworth RD	Daventry	West
Clopton			Oundle & Thrapston RD	East	North
Cogenhoe & Whiston	1,436	652.29	Northampton RD	South	West
Cold Ashby	278	872.24	Brixworth RD	Daventry	West
Cold Higham	290	699.47	Towcester RD	South	West
Collingtree	1,138	129.59	Northampton RD	Northampton	West
Collyweston	514	634.89	Oundle & Thrapston RD	East	North
Corby			Corby UD	Corby	North
Cosgrove	521	688.50	Towcester RD	South	West
Cotterstock	153	286.16	Oundle & Thrapston RD	East	North
Cottesbrooke	143	1141.62	Brixworth RD	Daventry	West
Cottingham	906	511.41	Kettering RD	Corby	North
Courteenhall	122	818.69	Northampton RD	South	West
Cranford	422	1283.84	Kettering RD	Kettering	North
Cransley	305	660.36	Kettering RD	Kettering	North
Creaton	503	530.67	Brixworth RD	Daventry	West
Crick	1,886	2199.25	Daventry RD	Daventry	West
Croughton	992	873.22	Brackley RD	South	West
Culworth	445	927.98	Brackley RD	South	West
Daventry (town)	25,026	1469.47	Daventry MB	Daventry	West
Deanshanger	3,817	953.99	Towcester RD	South	West
Deene			Oundle & Thrapston RD	East	North
Deenethorpe	133	1283.07	Oundle & Thrapston RD	East	North
Denford	282	709.76	Oundle & Thrapston RD	East	North
Denton	739	629.34	Northampton RD	South	West
Desborough (town)	10,697	967.53	Desborough	Kettering	North
Dingley	194	625.90	Kettering RD	Kettering	North
Dodford	203	586.52	Daventry RD	Daventry	West
Draughton			Brixworth RD	Daventry	West
Duddington-with-Fineshade	281	1662.24	Oundle & Thrapston RD	East	North
Duston	15,498	373.95	Northampton CB	Northampton	West
Earls Barton	5,387	932.77	Wellingborough RD	Wellingborough	North
East Carlton	259	657.80	Kettering RD	Corby	North
East Farndon	307	576.98	Brixworth RD	Daventry	West
East Haddon	643	257.20	Brixworth RD	Daventry	West
East Hunsbury				Northampton	West
Easton Maudit			Wellingborough RD	Wellingborough	North
Easton Neston			Towcester RD	South	West
Easton on the Hill	1,015	1355.47	Oundle & Thrapston RD	East	North
Ecton	466	881.59	Wellingborough RD	Wellingborough	North
Elkington			Daventry RD	Daventry	West
Evenley	571	1278.67	Brackley RD	South	West
Everdon	356	1034.71	Daventry RD	Daventry	West
Eydon	422	676.74	Brackley RD	South	West
Far Cotton & Delapre				Northampton	West
Farthinghoe	413	1088.67	Brackley RD	South	West
Farthingstone	193	728.52	Daventry RD	Daventry	West
Fawsley			Daventry RD	Daventry	West
Finedon	4,309	1481.76	Wellingborough UD	Wellingborough	North
Flore	1,194	1091.56	Daventry RD	Daventry	West
Fotheringhay	119	866.39	Oundle & Thrapston RD	East	North
Gayton	544	702.70	Towcester RD	South	West
Geddington	1,503	954.63	Kettering RD	Kettering	North
Glapthorn	271	598.17	Oundle & Thrapston RD	East	North
Grafton Regis	253	929.25	Towcester RD	South	West
Grafton Underwood	146	737.32	Kettering RD	Kettering	North
Grange Park	4,404	218.12	Northampton RD	South	West
Great Addington	327	509.94	Oundle & Thrapston RD	East	North
Great Doddington	1,123	611.27	Wellingborough RD	Wellingborough	North
Great Harrowden	161	949.96	Wellingborough RD	Wellingborough	North
Great Houghton	642	366.22	Northampton RD	Northampton	West
Great Oxendon	331	753.83	Brixworth RD	Daventry	West
Greatworth & Halse	890	1597.65	Brackley RD	South	West
Greens Norton	1,526	954.08	Towcester RD	South	West
Grendon	544	697.90	Wellingborough RD	Wellingborough	North
Gretton	1,285	1531.78	Kettering RD	Corby	North
Guilsborough	692	909.27	Brixworth RD	Daventry	West
Hackleton	2,054	2632.15	Northampton RD	South	West
Hannington	251	502.55	Brixworth RD	Daventry	West
Hardingstone	2,014	540.34	Northampton RD	Northampton	West
Hardwick			Wellingborough RD	Wellingborough	North
Hargrave	241	577.55	Oundle & Thrapston RD	East	North
Harlestone Manor			Brixworth RD	Daventry	West
Harlestone	445	1125.26	Brixworth RD	Daventry	West
Harpole	1,546	832.77	Northampton RD	South	West
Harrington	146	1100.68	Kettering RD	Kettering	North
Harringworth	241	1395.14	Kettering RD	East	North
Hartwell	1,875	905.18	Northampton RD	South	West
Haselbech			Brixworth RD	Daventry	West
Hellidon	282	1488.53	Daventry RD	Daventry	West
Helmdon	899	1555.20	Brackley RD	South	West
Hemington	257	1434.93	Oundle & Thrapston RD	East	North
Higham Ferrers (town)	8,083	854.76	Higham Ferrers MB	East	North
Hinton-in-the-Hedges	167	604.86	Brackley RD	South	West
Holcot	438	529.38	Brixworth RD	Daventry	West
Holdenby	170	1612.19	Brixworth RD	Daventry	West
Hollowell	385	706.05	Brixworth RD	Daventry	West
Hunsbury Meadows				Northampton	West
Irchester	4,745	1128.22	Wellingborough RD	Wellingborough	North
Irthlingborough (town)	8,535	1178.61	Irthlingborough UD	East	North
Isham	771	568.17	Wellingborough RD	Wellingborough	North
Islip	829	561.67	Oundle & Thrapston RD	East	North
Kelmarsh	208	1827.15	Brixworth RD	Daventry	West
Kettering Town				Kettering	North
Kilsby	1,196	1041.52	Daventry RD	Daventry	West
King's Cliffe	1,202	1517.07	Oundle & Thrapston RD	East	North
Kings Sutton	2,116	1664.56	Brackley RD	South	West
Kingsthorpe				Northampton	West
Kislingbury	1,237	561.93	Northampton RD	South	West
Lamport	225	1861.15	Brixworth RD	Daventry	West
Laxton	234	1366.58	Oundle & Thrapston RD	East	North
Lilbourne	273	146.49	Daventry RD	Daventry	West
Lilford-cum-Wigsthorpe			Oundle & Thrapston RD	East	North
Litchborough	321	708.39	Towcester RD	South	West
Little Addington	328	460.24	Oundle & Thrapston RD	East	North
Little Harrowden	892	636.18	Wellingborough RD	Wellingborough	North
Little Houghton	403	983.80	Northampton RD	South	West
Loddington	520	1074.43	Kettering RD	Kettering	North
Long Buckby	3,913	1646.46	Daventry RD	Daventry	West
Lowick	298	1158.49	Oundle & Thrapston RD	East	North
Luddington			Oundle & Thrapston RD	East	North
Lutton	186	568.15	Oundle & Thrapston RD	East	North
Maidford	168	439.13	Towcester RD	South	West
Maidwell	429	1327.36	Brixworth RD	Daventry	West
Marston St Lawrence	202	606.25	Brackley RD	South	West
Marston Trussell	157	1082.35	Brixworth RD	Daventry	West
Mawsley	2,320	191.57	Kettering RD	Kettering	North
Mears Ashby	473	674.45	Wellingborough RD	Wellingborough	North
Middleton Cheney	3,597	796.12	Brackley RD	South	West
Middleton	414	697.55	Kettering RD	Corby	North
Milton Malsor	761	301.20	Northampton RD	South	West
Moreton Pinkney	371	986.23	Brackley RD	South	West
Moulton	3,454	1027.63	Brixworth RD	Daventry	West
Naseby	687	1382.54	Brixworth RD	Daventry	West
Nassington	827	1015.92	Oundle & Thrapston RD	East	North
Nether Heyford	1,637	849.45	Northampton RD	South	West
Newbottle	528	883.01	Brackley RD	South	West
Newnham	580	782.77	Daventry RD	Daventry	West
Newton & Little Oakley	126	1038.74	Kettering RD	Kettering	North
Newton Bromswold			Wellingborough RD	East	North
Northampton				Northampton	West
Norton	434	1612.25	Daventry RD	Daventry	West
Old Stratford	1,996	434.32	Towcester RD	South	West
Old	490	829.91	Brixworth RD	Daventry	West
Orlingbury	439	785.88	Wellingborough RD	Wellingborough	North
Orton			Kettering RD	Kettering	North
Oundle (town)	5,735	901.03	Oundle UD	East	North
Overstone	741	644.24	Brixworth RD	Daventry	West
Overthorpe	235	679.01	Brackley RD	South	West
Pattishall	1,471	1087.22	Towcester RD	South	West
Paulerspury	1,018	1227.60	Towcester RD	South	West
Pilton			Oundle & Thrapston RD	East	North
Pitsford	671	575.70	Brixworth RD	Daventry	West
Polebrook	478	1087.89	Oundle & Thrapston RD	East	North
Potterspury	1,453	949.69	Towcester RD	South	West
Preston Capes	216	1869.98	Daventry RD	Daventry	West
Pytchley	489	1081.06	Kettering RD	Kettering	North
Quinton	204	443.77	Northampton RD	South	West
Radstone			Brackley RD	South	West
Raunds (town)	8,641	1808.32	Raunds UD	East	North
Ravensthorpe	646	890.39	Brixworth RD	Daventry	West
Ringstead	1,461	815.09	Oundle & Thrapston RD	East	North
Roade	2,312	672.27	Northampton RD	South	West
Rockingham	113	293.77	Kettering RD	Corby	North
Rothersthorpe	472	418.52	Northampton RD	South	West
Rothwell (town)	7,694	1372.17	Rothwell UD	Kettering	North
Rushden (town)	29,272	1546.70	Rushden UD	East	North
Rushton	461	1746.81	Kettering RD	Kettering	North
Scaldwell	302	495.84	Brixworth RD	Daventry	West
Shutlanger	290	551.43	Towcester RD	South	West
Sibbertoft	462	1466.11	Brixworth RD	Daventry	West
Silverstone	2,176	757.32	Towcester RD	South	West
Slapton			Towcester RD	South	West
Southwick	181	1809.26	Oundle & Thrapston RD	East	North
Spratton	1,150	908.47	Brixworth RD	Daventry	West
Stanford			Daventry RD	Daventry	West
Stanion	1,252	666.09	Kettering RD	Corby	North
Stanwick	1,942	812.81	Raunds UD	East	North
Staverton	458	898.74	Daventry RD	Daventry	West
Stoke Albany	390	1545.72	Kettering RD	Kettering	North
Stoke Bruerne	373	514.03	Towcester RD	South	West
Stoke Doyle			Oundle & Thrapston RD	East	North
Stowe IX Churches	259	733.21	Daventry RD	Daventry	West
Strixton			Wellingborough RD	Wellingborough	North
Sudborough	202	735.50	Oundle & Thrapston RD	East	North
Sulby			Brixworth RD	Daventry	West
Sulgrave	380	821.17	Brackley RD	South	West
Sutton Bassett			Kettering RD	Kettering	North
Syresham	855	1509.68	Brackley RD	South	West
Sywell	792	879.59	Wellingborough RD	Wellingborough	North
Tansor	172	602.04	Oundle & Thrapston RD	East	North
Thenford			Brackley RD	South	West
Thornby	189	499.18	Brixworth RD	Daventry	West
Thorpe Achurch	421	2191.74	Oundle & Thrapston RD	East	North
Thorpe Malsor	145	352.47	Kettering RD	Kettering	North
Thorpe Mandeville	327	1391.48	Brackley RD	South	West
Thrapston (town)	6,239	564.68	Oundle & Thrapston RD	East	North
Thurning			Oundle & Thrapston RD	East	North
Tiffield	362	512.91	Towcester RD	South	West
Titchmarsh	598	1514.38	Oundle & Thrapston RD	East	North
Towcester (town)	9,252	2178.99	Towcester RD	South	West
Twywell	176	375.90	Oundle & Thrapston RD	East	North
Upper Heyford			Northampton RD	South	West
Upton	3,664	538.14	Northampton RD	Northampton	West
Wadenhoe	244	1686.65	Oundle & Thrapston RD	East	North
Wakerley			Oundle & Thrapston RD	East	North
Walgrave	868	919.93	Brixworth RD	Daventry	West
Wappenham	294	929.08	Towcester RD	South	West
Warkton	136	600.71	Kettering RD	Kettering	North
Warkworth			Brackley RD	South	West
Warmington	939	1591.81	Oundle & Thrapston RD	East	North
Watford	320	1322.22	Daventry RD	Daventry	West
Weedon Bec	2,706	816.40	Daventry RD	Daventry	West
Weekley	297	584.13	Kettering RD	Kettering	North
Weldon	2,099	1285.02	Corby UD	Corby	North
Welford	1,043	1267.22	Brixworth RD	Daventry	West
Wellingborough			Wellingborough UD	Wellingborough	North
Welton	608	799.00	Daventry RD	Daventry	West
West Haddon	1,718	1093.50	Daventry RD	Daventry	West
West Hunsbury				Northampton	West
Weston & Weedon	360	1292.94	Towcester RD	South	West
Weston by Welland	246	718.69	Kettering RD	Kettering	North
Whilton	271	392.79	Daventry RD	Daventry	West
Whitfield	274	932.59	Brackley RD	South	West
Whittlebury	589	1310.45	Towcester RD	South	West
Wicken	295	939.27	Towcester RD	South	West
Wilbarston	753	1278.75	Kettering RD	Kettering	North
Wilby	624	469.14	Wellingborough RD	Wellingborough	North
Winwick			Daventry RD	Daventry	West
Wollaston	3,491	1559.74	Wellingborough RD	Wellingborough	North
Woodend	322	1555.80	Towcester RD	South	West
Woodford cum Membris	3,493	1130.60	Daventry RD	Daventry	West
Woodford	1,461	920.66	Oundle & Thrapston RD	East	North
Woodnewton	450	564.43	Oundle & Thrapston RD	East	North
Wootton	17,867	535.10	Northampton RD	Northampton	West
Yardley Gobion	1,348	576.83	Towcester RD	South	West
Yardley Hastings	745	1693.88	Northampton RD	South	West
Yarwell	294	494.64	Oundle & Thrapston RD	East	North
Yelvertoft	764	936.42	Daventry RD	Daventry	West

== Earliest parishes ==
The following parishes can be identified as having existed as independent units in Northamptonshire from the times of earliest recording (at or shortly before the time of Domesday Book):

Abington, Addington (Great and Little), Alderton, Aldwincle (2 parishes), Apethorpe, Arthingworth, Ashby, Ashby, Ashby, Ashby, Ashley, Aston, Aynhoe, Badby, Banbury (part), Barby, Barnack, Barnwell (2 parishes), Barton, Barton, Benefield, Billing (Great and Little), Blakesley, Blatherwycke (2 parishes), Blisworth, Boddington, Boughton, Bowden (Little), Bozeat, Brackley, Bradden, Brafield, Brampton, Brampton, Braunston, Braybrooke, Brigstock, Brington, Brixworth, Brockhall, Broughton, Buckby, Bugbrooke, Bulwick, Burton, Byfield, Castor, Catesby, Catworth (part), Chalcombe, Charwelton, Cliffe, Clipston, Clopton, Cogenhoe, Collingtree, Corby, Cosgrove, Cotterstock, Cottesbrooke, Cottingham, Courteenhall, Cranford (2 parishes), Cransley, Creaton, Crick, Croughton, Culworth, Dallington, Daventry, Deene, Denford, Desborough, Dingley, Doddington, Dodford, Draughton, Duston, Easton, Easton, Easton, Ecton, Edgcote, Elkington, Etton, Evenley, Everdon, Eydon, Eye, Farndish (part), Farndon, Farthinghoe, Farthingstone, Fawsley, Finedon, Floore, Fotheringhay, Furthoe, Gayton, Geddington, Glendon, Grafton, Grafton, Greatworth, Grendon, Gretton, Guilsborough, Haddon, Haddon, Halse, Hampton (9 parishes), Hannington, Hanslope (part), Hardingston, Hardwick, Hargrave, Harleston, Harpole, Harrington, Harringworth, Harrowden, Haselbech, Helmdon, Helpston, Hemington, Heyford, Higham, Higham, Hinton, Holcot, Holdenby, Horton, Houghton (Great and Little), Irchester, Irthlingborough (2 parishes), Isham, Islip, Kettering, Kilsby, Kislingbury, Lamport, Laxton, Lilbourne, Lilford, Litchborough, Loddington, Lowick, Luddington (part), Lutton (part), Maidford, Maidwell, Marholm, Marston, Marston, Maxey, Middleton, Milton, Moreton, Moulton, Naseby, Nassington, Newbottle, Newton, Northborough, Norton, Norton, Oakley (Great and Little), Orlingbury, Oundle, Overston, Oxendon, Passenham, Paston, Pattishall, Paulerspury, Peakirk, Peterborough, Pilton, Pitsford, Plumpton, Polebrook, Potterspury, Preston, Preston, Pytchley, Quinton, Radstone, Raunds, Ravensthorpe, Roade, Rockingham, Rothersthorpe, Rothwell, Rushden, Rushton (2 parishes), Scaldwell, Sibbertoft, Slapton, Slipton, Southwick, Spratton, Stamford (2 parishes within the county), Stanford, Stanwick, Staverton, Steane, Stoke, Stoke, Stoke, Stowe, Strixton, Stuchbury, Sudborough, Sulby, Sulgrave, Sutton, Sywell, Syresham, Tansor, Theddingworth (part), Thenford, Thornby, Thornhaugh, Thorpe, Thorpe, Thorpe, Thrapston, Thurning (part), Tiffield, Titchmarsh, Towcester, Twywell, Ufford, Wadenhoe, Wakerley, Walgrave, Wappenham, Warden, Warkton, Warmington, Watford, Weedon, Weedon, Weekley, Weldon, Welford, Wellingborough, Weston, Weston, Weston, Whilton, Whiston, Whitfield, Wicken, Wilbarston, Wilby, Winwick, Winwick (part), Wittering, Wold, Wollaston, Woodford, Woodford, Wootton, Wothorpe, Yardley, Yelvertoft

== Timeline of parish changes during the Middle Ages ==
Parish boundaries across England were mostly finalised by the time of the solidification of canon law circa 1220. Changes continued at a slower rate until the Reformation, mostly in the form of abolition of redundant small urban parishes.

- 12th century or early in the medieval period:
  - Bainton created out of Ufford.
  - Boddington divided into Lower Boddington and Upper Boddington.
  - Brackley divided into Brackley St James and Brackley St Peter.
  - Brampton divided into Chapel Brampton and Church Brampton.
  - Chelveston-cum-Caldecott created out of Higham Ferrers.
  - Denton created out of Yardley Hastings.
  - Duddington created out of Gretton.
  - East Carlton created out of Cottingham.
  - Fineshade created out of Laxton.
  - Glapthorn created out of Cotterstock.
  - Glinton created out of Peakirk.
  - Halse abolished and merged into Brackley.
  - Hartwell created out of Roade.
  - Heyford divided into Nether Heyford and Upper Heyford.
  - Irthlingborough created by the merger of Irthlingborough All Saints and Irthlingborough St Peter.
  - Kelmarsh created out of Maidwell.
  - Kingsthorpe and Upton created out of Northampton St Peter.
  - Little Harrowden created out of Great Harrowden.
  - Piddington created out of Horton.
  - Ringstead created out of Denford.
  - Silverstone and Whittlebury created out of Green's Norton.
  - Stanion created out of Brigstock.
  - Sutton Bassett created out of Weston by Welland.
  - Wansford created out of Thornhaugh.
  - Warkworth created out of Marston St Lawrence.
  - Welton created out of Daventry.
  - Wicken divided into Wick Dive and Wick Hamon.
  - Woodnewton and Yarwell created out of Nassington.
- early 13th century:
  - Hellidon created out of Catesby.
- 1411:
  - Northampton St Edmund abolished and merged into Northampton St Giles.
- 1434:
  - Stamford Baron All Saints abolished and merged into Stamford Baron St Martin.
- 1448:
  - Blatherwycke created by the merger of Blatherwycke Holy Trinity and Blatherwycke St Mary Magdalene.
- 16th century:
  - The Althorp area of Brington becomes extra-parochial.
  - Ashton created out of Roade.
  - Clay Coton created out of Lilbourne.
  - Elkington abolished, becoming extra-parochial.
  - Newnham created out of Badby; Lands Common to Badby and Newnham becomes extra-parochial.
  - Northampton St Bartholomew abolished and merged into Northampton St Sepulchre.
  - Northampton St Michael abolished and merged into Northampton St Sepulchre.
- 1536 (Dissolution of the Monasteries) or thereabouts:
  - Barford created, previously a chapelry in the parish of Rushton All Saints.
  - Fineshade and Sulby abolished, becoming extra-parochial.
  - Newton created, previously a chapelry in the parish of Geddington.
  - Wothorpe abolished and merged into Stamford Baron St Martin.
- 1541:
  - Peterborough Minster Close Precincts becomes extra-parochial upon Peterborough Abbey's being created a cathedral.

== Hundreds and parishes at the Reformation ==
By the middle of the 16th century the system of hundreds, which had been somewhat fluid through the Middle Ages, had become finalised. The structure of hundreds and parishes would remain essentially unchanged until the 1830s. XP stands for extra-parochial.

Hundred	Parishes
Chipping Warden	Aston-le-Walls • Byfield • Chipping Warden • Edgcote • Eydon • Greatworth • Lower Boddington • Stoneton (XP) • Sulgrave • Upper Boddington • Woodford cum Membris
Cleley	Alderton • Ashton • Cosgrove • Easton Neston • Furtho • Grafton Regis • Hanslope (part) • Hartwell • Passenham • Paulerspury • Potterspury • Roade • Salcey and Hartwell Lodges (XP) • Stoke Bruerne • Wick Dive • Wick Hamon
Corby	Ashley • Beanfield Lawns (XP) • Blatherwycke • Brampton Ash • Brigstock • Bulwick • Bulwick Short Leys (XP) • Corby • Cottingham • Deene • Dingley • East Carlton • Fineshade (XP) • Geddington • Great Oakley • Gretton • Harringworth • Laxton • Little Oakley • Newton • Rockingham • Stanion • Stoke Albany • Sutton Bassett • Wakerley • Weekley • Weldon • Weston by Welland • Wilbarston
Fawsley	Ashby St Ledgers • Badby • Barby • Braunston • Catesby • Charwelton • Daventry • Dodford • Everdon • Farthingstone • Fawsley • Hellidon • Kilsby • Lands Common to Badby and Newnham (XP) • Litchborough • Newnham • Norton • Preston Capes • Staverton • Stowe Nine Churches • Weedon Bec • Welton
Greens Norton	Blakesley • Bradden • Canons Ashby • Greens Norton • Luffield Abbey (XP, part) • Maidford • Moreton Pinkney • Plumpton • Silverstone • Slapton • Weedon Lois • Whittlebury
Guilsborough	Clay Coton • Cold Ashby • Cottesbrooke • Crick • Elkington (XP) • Great Creaton • Guilsborough • Lilbourne • Long Buckby • Naseby • Ravensthorpe (part) • Spratton (part) • Stanford • Thornby • Watford • Welford • West Haddon • Winwick • Yelvertoft
Hamfordshoe	Earls Barton • Ecton • Great Doddington • Holcot • Mears Ashby • Sywell • Wellingborough • Wilby
Higham Ferrers	Bozeat • Chelveston-cum-Caldecott • Easton Maudit • Farndish (part) • Hargrave • Higham Ferrers • Higham Park (XP) • Irchester • Newton Bromswold • Raunds • Ringstead • Rushden • Stanwick • Strixton • Wollaston
Huxloe	Aldwincle All Saints • Aldwincle St Peter • Barnwell All Saints • Barton Seagrave • Burton Latimer • Cranford St Andrew • Cranford St John • Denford • Finedon • Grafton Underwood • Great Addington • Irthlingborough • Islip • Kettering • Lilford-cum-Wigsthorpe • Little Addington • Lowick • Slipton • Sudborough • Twywell • Warkton • Woodford
Kings Sutton	Aynho • Banbury (part) • Brackley St James • Brackley St Peter • Chacombe • Croughton • Culworth • Evenley • Farthinghoe • Helmdon • Hinton-in-the-Hedges • Kings Sutton • Marston St Lawrence • Middleton Cheney • Newbottle • Radstone • Steane • Stuchbury • Syresham • Thenford • Thorpe Mandeville • Wappenham • Warkworth • Whitfield
Nassaborough or Soke of Peterborough	Bainton • Barnack • Borough Fen (XP) • Castor • Etton • Eye • Glinton • Helpston • Marholm • Maxey • Northborough • Paston • Peakirk • Peterborough Minster Close Precincts (XP) • Peterborough St John the Baptist • Stamford Baron St Martin • Thornhaugh • Ufford • Wansford • Wittering
Navisford	Clopton • Great Catworth (part) • Pilton • Stoke Doyle • Thorpe Achurch • Thrapston • Titchmarsh • Wadenhoe
Nobottle Grove	Althorp (XP) • Brington • Brockhall • Bugbrooke • Chapel Brampton • Church Brampton • Dallington • Duston • East Haddon • Flore • Harlestone • Harpole • Holdenby • Kislingbury • Nether Heyford • Ravensthorpe (part) • Upper Heyford • Upton • Whilton
Orlingbury	Brixworth • Broughton • Cransley • Great Harrowden • Hannington • Hardwick • Isham • Lamport • Little Harrowden • Mawsley (XP) • Old • Orlingbury • Pytchley • Scaldwell • Walgrave
Polebrook	Barnwell St Andrew • Benefield • Hemington • Luddington (part) • Oundle (part) • Polebrook • Thurning (part) • Warmington • Winwick (part)
Rothwell	Arthingworth • Barford • Braybrooke • Clipston • Desborough • Draughton • East Farndon • Glendon • Great Oxendon • Harrington • Haselbech • Kelmarsh • Little Bowden • Loddington • Maidwell • Marston Trussell • Rothwell • Rushton All Saints • Rushton St Peter • Sibbertoft • Sulby (XP) • Theddingworth (part) • Thorpe Lubenham (XP) • Thorpe Malsor
Spelhoe	Abington • Boughton • Great Billing • Kingsthorpe • Little Billing • Moulton • Moulton Park (XP) • Northampton All Saints • Northampton Priory of St Andrew (XP) • Northampton St Giles • Northampton St Gregory • Northampton St Mary • Northampton St Peter • Northampton St Sepulchre • Overstone • Pitsford • Spratton (part) • Weston Favell
Towcester	Cold Higham • Gayton • Pattishall • Tiffield • Towcester
Willybrook	Apethorpe • Collyweston • Cotterstock • Duddington • Easton-on-the-Hill • Fotheringhay • Glapthorn • Kings Cliffe • Lutton (part) • Moorhay Lodge (XP) • Nassington • Oundle (part) • Southwick • Tansor • Woodnewton • Yarwell
Wymersley	Blisworth • Brafield-on-the-Green • Castle Ashby • Cogenhoe • Collingtree • Courteenhall • Denton • Great Houghton • Grendon • Hardingstone • Horton • Little Houghton • Milton • Piddington • Preston Deanery • Quinton • Rothersthorpe • Whiston • Wootton • Yardley Hastings

Northamptonshire parishes and hundreds at the Reformation

== Timeline of changes from 1550 to 1900 ==
- 1577:
  - Northampton St Gregory abolished and merged into Northampton All Saints.
- 1587:
  - Wicken created by the merger of Wick Dive and Wick Hamon.
- 1589:
  - Northampton St Mary abolished and merged into Northampton All Saints.
- 1625:
  - Barford abolished, becoming extra-parochial.
- 1737:
  - Abthorpe created from Towcester.
- 1780 (or late 16th century):
  - Rushton created by the merger of Rushton All Saints and Rushton St Peter.
- 1822:
  - Newborough created out of part of Borough Fen.
- 20 October 1844:
  - That part of Farndish lying within Northamptonshire is transferred to Bedfordshire.
  - That part of the extra-parochial area of Luffield Abbey lying within Northamptonshire is merged into Silverstone.
- 1851:
  - That part of Elton lying within Northamptonshire is transferred to Huntingdonshire.
- 1858 (Extra Parochial Places Act):
  - The parishes of Althorp, Barford, Beanfield Lawns, Borough Fen, Elkington, Fineshade, Higham Park, Lands Common to Badby and Newnham, Mawsley, Moulton Park, Northampton Priory of St Andrew, Peterborough Minster Close Precincts, Stoneton, Sulby and Thorpe Lubenham created from previously extra-parochial areas.
- 1866 (Poor Law Amendment Act 1866: the legal definition of parish was changed to be those areas which maintained their own poor laws):
  - Adstone created, previously a chapelry within the parish of Canons Ashby.
  - Ailsworth, Sutton and Upton created out of Castor.
  - Appletree created out of Aston le Walls.
  - Armston created out of Polebrook.
  - Ashton created out of Oundle.
  - Ashton created out of Ufford.
  - Astwell with Falcutt created out of Wappenham.
  - Coton and Teeton created out of Ravensthorpe.
  - Deenethorpe created out of Deene.
  - Deeping Gate created out of Maxey.
  - Faxton and Hanging Houghton created out of Lamport.
  - Gunthorpe, Walton and Werrington created out of Paston.
  - Hackleton created out of Piddington.
  - Heyford divided into Nether Heyford and Upper Heyford.
  - Hollowell created out of Guilsborough.
  - Hothorpe created from that portion of the parish of Theddingworth lying within Northamptonshire.
  - Little Creaton created out of Spratton.
  - Middleton created out of Cottingham.
  - Orton created, previously a chapelry in the parish of Rothwell.
  - Pilsgate and Southorpe created out of Barnack.
  - Shutlanger created, previously a chapelry within the parish of Stoke Bruerne.
  - That part of Banbury lying within Northamptonshire (the Grimsbury area) transferred to Warkworth.
  - Weldon divided into Little Weldon and Great Weldon.
  - Woodend created out of Blakesley.
  - Wothorpe re-created out of Stamford Baron St Martin.
  - Yardley Gobion created out of Potterspury (some land remains undivided and common to both).
- 1869:
  - Bulwick Short Leys extra-parochial place abolished and merged into Bulwick.
  - Moorhay Lodge extra-parochial place abolished and merged into Southwick.
- 1879:
  - Most of the extra-parochial area of Salcey and Hartwell Lodges is absorbed into Hanslope, while remaining in Northamptonshire. A small area instead becomes part of Ashton.
- 25 March 1884:
  - Brackley St James abolished and merged into Brackley St Peter.
  - A detached portion of Byfield is transferred to Chipping Warden.
  - Creaton created by the merger of Great Creaton and Little Creaton.
  - A small portion of Warkworth is transferred to Boddicot in Oxfordshire.
- 25 March 1885:
  - Aldwincle created by the merger of Aldwincle All Saints and Aldwincle St Peter.
  - A detached portion of Fineshade is transferred to Blatherwycke.
  - King's Sutton with Newbottle created by the merger of King's Sutton and Newbottle.
  - A detached portion of Marston St Lawrence is transferred to Middleton Cheney.
  - That part of Thorpe by Water lying within Northamptonshire is transferred to Gretton.
- 24 March 1887:
  - Ashton abolished and merged into Bainton.
  - Pilsgate abolished and merged back into Barnack.
- 1889 (Local Government Act 1888):
  - Part of Little Bowden is transferred to Leicestershire.
  - The parishes in the Soke of Peterborough (Ailsworth, Bainton, Barnack, Borough Fen, Castor, Deeping Gate, Etton, Eye, Glinton, Gunthorpe, Helpston, Marholm, Maxey, Newborough, Northborough, Paston, Peakirk, Peterborough Minster Close Precincts, Peterborough St John the Baptist, Southorpe, Sutton, Thornhaugh, Ufford, Upton, Walton, Wansford, Werrington, Wittering, Wothorpe and the rural part of Stamford Baron St Martin) become a separate administrative county. That part of Stamford Baron St Martin lying within the boundaries of Stamford municipal borough is transferred to Lincolnshire, so that the parish straddles the two counties. For further changes to these parishes see Soke of Peterborough#Civil parishes over time.
  - The Grimsbury part of Warkworth is transferred to Oxfordshire, so that Warkworth straddles the county boundary (until 1894).
- 1894 (Local Government Act 1894):
  - Those parts of Hanslope lying within Northamptonshire are transferred to Hartwell.
  - That part of Little Bowden remaining in Northamptonshire (the area of Little Oxendon) is merged into Great Oxendon.
- 1 April 1895:
  - Dallington St James created from that part of the parish of Dallington in Hardingstone Urban District.
  - Duston St James created from that part of the parish of Duston in Hardingstone Urban District.
  - Far Cotton created from that part of the parish of Hardingstone in Hardingstone Urban District.
- 30 September 1895:
  - Stoneton transferred to Warwickshire.
  - Those parts of Thurning, Luddington and Lutton lying within Huntingdonshire are transferred to Northamptonshire.
  - The majority of Winwick, lying within Northamptonshire, is transferred to Huntingdonshire.
- 1 April 1896:
  - King's Sutton with Newbottle split back into the parishes of King's Sutton and Newbottle.

== Map of parishes and districts in 1900 ==
Civil parishes of Northamptonshire on 1 January 1900, showing rural districts (RD), urban districts (UD), municipal boroughs (MB) and county boroughs (CB).

== Timeline of changes from 1900 to 1955 ==
- 1 April 1909:
  - Northampton created by the merger of All Saints, Priory of St Andrew, St Giles, St Peter and St Sepulchre.
- 1 April 1913:
  - Abington, Dallington St James, Duston St James and Kingsthorpe abolished and merged into Northampton.
- 1 April 1932:
  - Far Cotton abolished and merged into Northampton.
  - Moulton Park abolished and divided between the parishes of Northampton and Boughton.
- 1 April 1935:
  - Alderton abolished and merged into Grafton Regis.
  - Appletree abolished and merged into Aston-le-Walls.
  - Armston abolished and merged into Polebrook.
  - Astwell with Falcutt abolished and merged into Helmdon.
  - Barnwell created by the merger of Barnwell All Saints and Barnwell St Andrew.
  - Barton Seagrave abolished and divided between Kettering and Cranford.
  - Beanfield Lawns abolished and merged into Cottingham.
  - Billing created by the merger of Great Billing and Little Billing.
  - Boddington created by the merger of Lower Boddington and Upper Boddington.
  - Coton abolished and merged into Ravensthorpe.
  - Cranford created by the merger of Cranford St Andrew, Cranford St John and part of Barton Seagrave.
  - Dallington abolished and merged into Duston.
  - Faxton and Hanging Houghton abolished and merged into Lamport.
  - Finedon abolished and merged into Wellingborough.
  - Glendon abolished and merged into Rushton.
  - Higham Park abolished and merged into Newton Bromswold.
  - Horton, Piddington and Preston Deanery abolished and merged into Hackleton.
  - Hothorpe and Thorpe Lubenham abolished and merged into Marston Trussell.
  - Lands Common to Badby and Newnham abolished and split between Badby and Newnham.
  - Mawsley abolished and merged into Loddington.
  - Oakley created by the merger of Great Oakley and Little Oakley.
  - Slipton abolished and merged into Lowick.
  - Stanwick abolished and merged into Raunds.
  - Steane abolished and merged into Farthinghoe.
  - Stuchbury abolished and merged into Greatworth.
  - Teeton abolished and merged into Hollowell.
  - Undivided Land between the parishes of Potterspury and Yardley Gobion is split between these two parishes.
  - Weldon created by the merger of Great Weldon and Little Weldon.
  - Weston and Weedon created by the merger of Plumpton and Weedon Lois.
  - Whiston abolished and merged into Cogenhoe.
- 11 November 1948:
  - Passenham renamed Deanshanger.
- 1 April 1951:
  - Furtho abolished and divided between the parishes of Cosgrove, Old Stratford and Potterspury.
  - Old Stratford created out of the parishes of Deanshanger, Furtho and Cosgrove.

== Map of parishes and districts in 1955 ==
Civil parishes of Northamptonshire in 1955, showing rural districts (RD), urban districts (UD), municipal boroughs (MB) and county boroughs (CB). Most of the changes here are due to the County Review Order in 1935.

== Timeline of changes to parishes from 1955 on ==
- 1 May 1960:
  - Milton renamed Milton Malsor.
- 1 April 1965:
  - Duston abolished and split between Northampton, Upton and Harlestone.
  - Weston Favell abolished and split between Northampton and Billing.
- 1 April 1967:
  - Oakley abolished and split between Corby and Newton.
- 1 April 1974:
  - Brackley St Peter renamed Brackley.
  - Corby, Daventry, Kettering, Northampton (along with parts of Brafield on the Green, Ecton, Overstone and Rothersthorpe), Rushden and Wellingborough become unparished areas.
- 23 January 1980:
  - Cogenhoe renamed Cogenhoe and Whiston.
- 1 April 1983:
  - Finedon re-created out of part of the Wellingborough unparished area.
- 1 April 1988:
  - Duddington with Fineshade created by the merger of Duddington and Fineshade.
- 1990:
  - Wootton renamed Wootton and East Hunsbury.
- 1 April 1991:
  - Duston created out of part of the Northampton unparished area.
- 1 September 1996:
  - Newton renamed Newton and Little Oakley.
- 1 April 2000:
  - Overthorpe created out of part of Middleton Cheney.
  - Rushden becomes a parish again.
  - Stanwick re-created out of Raunds.
- 25 June 2001:
  - Stowe Nine Churches renamed Stowe IX Churches.
- 10 October 2001:
  - Barton Seagrave re-created out of the Kettering unparished area and the parish of Burton Latimer.
- 15 October 2001:
  - Grange Park created out of Courteenhall and Quinton.
- 1 April 2003:
  - Daventry becomes a parish again.
- 1 April 2004:
  - Alderton re-created out of Grafton Regis.
  - Mawsley re-created out of Cransley.
- 1 October 2008:
  - Chipping Warden and Edgcote created by the merger of Chipping Warden and Edgcote.
- 1 April 2009:
  - Church with Chapel Brampton created by the merger of Church Brampton and Chapel Brampton.
- 1 April 2013:
  - Hunsbury Meadows and West Hunsbury created out of the Northampton unparished area.
- 1 April 2015:
  - Wootton and East Hunsbury divided into the parishes of East Hunsbury and Wootton, Wootton Fields and Simpson Manor.
- 2 November 2015:
  - Wootton, Wootton Fields and Simpson Manor renamed Wootton.
- 1 April 2019:
  - Greatworth renamed Greatworth and Halse.
- 1 April 2020:
  - Harlestone Manor created out of Harlestone.
  - The Northampton unparished area is divided into the parishes of Far Cotton and Delapre, Kingsthorpe and Northampton.
- 1 April 2021:
  - Kettering Town parish created out of the Kettering unparished area and parts of the parishes of Barton Seagrave and Cranford.
  - Wellingborough parish created out of the Wellingborough unparished area and parts of the parishes of Finedon and Great Harrowden.
- 1 April 2022:
  - Corby Town parish created out of unparished areas.
- 1 January 2024:
  - Corby Town renamed Corby.

== See also ==
- List of civil parishes in England
