= Oxendon Rural District =

Historical rural district

Coordinates: 52.45°N 0.85°W

Oxendon was a rural district in Northamptonshire, England from 1894 to 1935.

It was formed under the Local Government Act 1894 from the part of the Market Harborough rural sanitary district which was in Northamptonshire (the rest going on to form Market Harborough Rural District in Leicestershire). It was named after Great Oxendon.

The rural district contained 19 civil parishes:

- Arthingworth
- Ashley
- Brampton Ash
- Braybrooke
- Clipston
- Dingley
- East Farndon
- Great Oxendon
- Hothorpe
- Kelmarsh
- Marston Trussell
- Sibbertoft
- Stoke Albany
- Sulby
- Sutton Bassett
- Thorpe Lubenham
- Welford
- Weston by Welland
- Wilbarston

The district was abolished in 1935 under a County Review Order. It was split between Brixworth Rural District and Kettering Rural District.
