= Wilbarston =

Village in Northamptonshire, England

Coordinates: 52.4884°N 0.8012°W

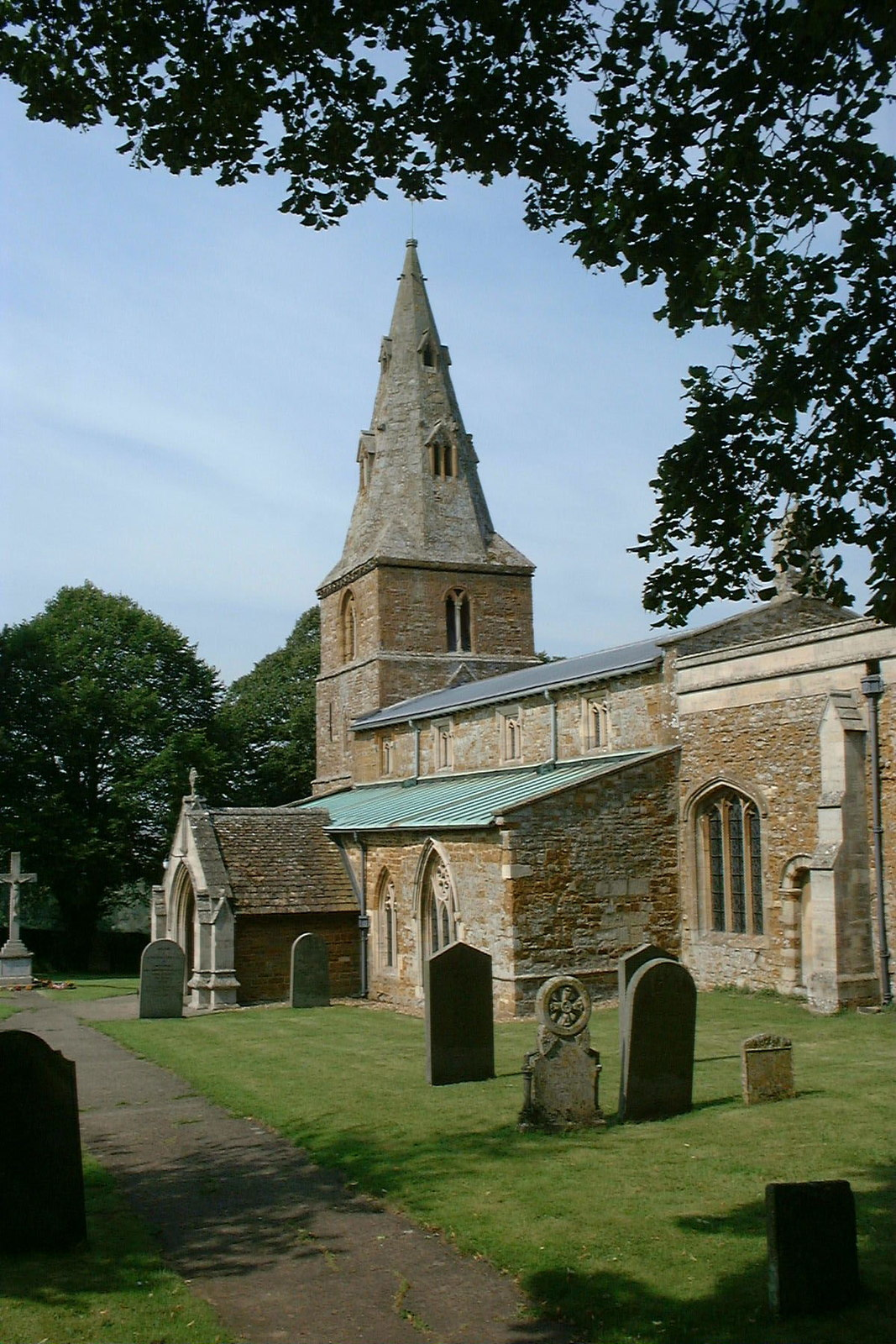
- All Saints' church, Wilbarston

- Location within Northamptonshire
- Population: 753 (2011)
- OS grid reference: SP8188
- Unitary authority: North Northamptonshire
- Ceremonial county: Northamptonshire
- Region: East Midlands
- Country: England
- Sovereign state: United Kingdom
- Post town: Market Harborough
- Postcode district: LE16
- Dialling code: 01536
- Police: Northamptonshire
- Fire: Northamptonshire
- Ambulance: East Midlands
- UK Parliament: Kettering

Wilbarston is a village and civil parish in the English county of Northamptonshire in the Welland valley. It is administered as part of North Northamptonshire and is five miles east of the Leicestershire town of Market Harborough, via the A427. At the time of the 2001 census, the parish's population was 767 people, including Pipewell but reducing slightly to 753 at the 2011 Census. A Community Governance Review concluded in February 2015 resulted in the ward of Pipewell becoming part of the civil parish of Rushton.

The village's name means 'farm/settlement of Wilbeorht'.

It has no secondary schools, but one primary school – Wilbarston C of E Primary School – that dates back to 1845. It was built with the intention of serving seven villages: Wilbarston, Stoke Albany, Dingley, Weston by Welland, Sutton Bassett, Ashley and Brampton Ash.

Despite being located in Northamptonshire, the village postal town and postcode are Market Harborough, Leicestershire, LE16.
