= Gretton Rural District =

Historical rural district

Coordinates: 52.55°N 0.65°W

Gretton was a rural district in Northamptonshire, England from 1894 to 1935. It was formed from the Northamptonshire part of the Uppingham rural sanitary district (the Rutland parts of which formed Uppingham Rural District and the Leicestershire parts of which formed Hallaton Rural District).

It consisted of the following parishes

- Fineshade
- Gretton
- Harringworth
- Laxton
- Rockingham
- Wakerley

It was abolished under a County Review Order and split, with Gretton and Rockingham going to Kettering Rural District and the other four parishes going to the new Oundle and Thrapston Rural District.
