= Kennet Gibson =

English antiquarian

- Born: 1730; Paston, Northamptonshire
- Died: 1772 (aged 41–42)
- Occupation: Antiquarian

Kennet Gibson (1730–1772) was an English antiquarian.

== Biography ==
Gibson was born at Paston, Northamptonshire, in 1730, the son of Thomas Gibson, M.A., rector of Paston. He was educated at Eton, and admitted a minor pensioner of Christ's College, Cambridge, 7 May 1748. He graduated B.A. in 1752 as fourteenth junior optime, and was ordained. He was later rector of Marholm, then in Northamptonshire, and curate of Castor in the same county.

== Works ==
On 3 July 1769, Gibson issued proposals for printing by a guinea subscription a commentary upon part of the fifth journey of Antoninus through Britain, but his death in 1772 interrupted the design. In 1795, the manuscript was offered to John Nichols by the possessor, Daniel Bayley, fellow of St. John's College, Cambridge. Nichols published it with considerable additions in ‘Miscellaneous Antiquities in continuation of the Bibliotheca Topographica Britannica’ as ‘A Comment upon part of the Fifth Journey of Antoninus through Britain, in which the situation of Durocobrivæ [Durobrivæ?], the seventh station there mentioned, is discussed; and Castor in Northamptonshire is shown, from the various Remains of Roman Antiquity, to have an undoubted Claim to that Situation. To which is added a Dissertation on an Image of Jupiter found there. By the Rev. Kennet Gibson. … Printed from the original MS. and enlarged with the Parochial History of Castor … to the present time. To which is subjoined an Account of Marham,’ &c. (by Richard Gough), 4to, London, 1800; 2nd edition, enlarged, 4to, London, 1819.
