= Upper Heyford =

Upper Heyford may refer to:

- Upper Heyford, Northamptonshire
- Upper Heyford, Oxfordshire
- RAF Upper Heyford, Oxfordshire
