= List of settlements in Northamptonshire by population =

Some of Northamptonshire's larger settlements.

This is a list of settlements in Northamptonshire ordered by population based on the results of the 2011 census. In 2011, there were 18 settlements with 5,000 or more inhabitants in Northamptonshire. The next United Kingdom census will take place in 2021.

== List of settlements ==
#	Town/village	Population (2021)	North/west	Notes
1	Northampton	243,520	West	
2	Corby	68,160	North	
3	Kettering	63,150	North	
4	Wellingborough	54,425	North	
5	Rushden	31,685	North	
6	Daventry	27,790	West	
7	Brackley	16,190	West	
8	Desborough	11,900	North	
9	Towcester	11,330	West	
10	Burton Latimer	10,445	North	Kettering's urban area
11	Raunds	10,230	North	
12	Irthlingborough	9,310	North	
13	Higham Ferrers	8,825	North	Rushden's urban area
14	Rothwell	8,620	North	
15	Thrapston	7,245	North	
16	Oundle	6,255	North	
17	Earls Barton	6,065	North	
18	Brixworth	5,770	West	

== See also ==
- List of places in Northamptonshire
- List of civil parishes in Northamptonshire
