= Kettering Rural District =

Former rural district in Northamptonshire, England

Coordinates: 52.45°N 0.75°W

Kettering was a rural district in Northamptonshire in England from 1894 to 1974.

It was formed under the Local Government Act 1972 based on Kettering rural sanitary district. It was named after but did not include Kettering itself.

Burton Latimer became a separate urban district in 1923. In 1935 it was expanded greatly under the County Review Order, taking in part of Oxendon Rural District, the parishes of Gretton and Rockingham from Gretton Rural District, and the parish of Mawsley from Brixworth Rural District.

In 1974 it was abolished under the Local Government Act 1972, with the bulk going to form part of the new Kettering district and the rest going to Corby.
