= Plumpton, Northamptonshire =

Village in Northamptonshire, England

Coordinates: 52°07′54″N 1°07′56″W

Plumpton
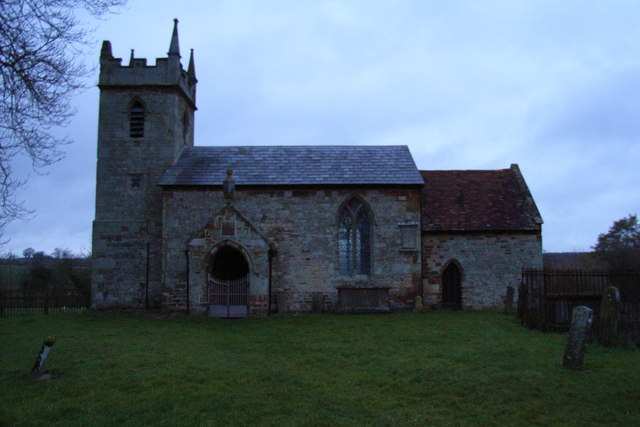
- St John the Baptist church, Plumpton

- Location within Northamptonshire
- Civil parish: Weston and Weedon
- Unitary authority: West Northamptonshire
- Ceremonial county: Northamptonshire
- Region: East Midlands
- Country: England
- Sovereign state: United Kingdom

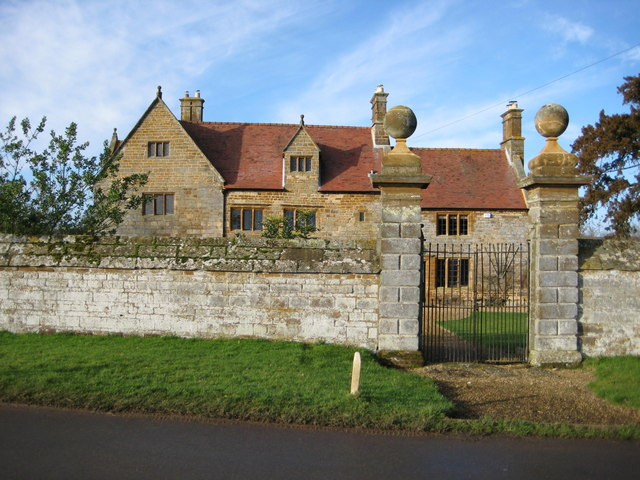
Plumpton manor house

Plumpton is a village and former civil parish, now in the parish of Weston and Weedon, in West Northamptonshire, England. It is within the ecclesiastical parish of "St Mary & St Peter Lois Weedon with Weston and Plumpton". In 1931 the parish had a population of 32.

The church of St John is grade II listed and is now cared for by a charity, the St. John the Baptist, Plumpton, Heritage Trust. The Manor House is grade II* listed; some of its associated gates and walls are separately grade II listed.

== History ==
The name 'Plumpton' means 'Plum-tree farm/settlement'.

The 1870-72 Imperial Gazetteer of England and Wales describes Plumpton as having a population of 42 in 12 houses, and describes the church as "good" and having a "pinnacled tower". On 1 April 1935 the parish was abolished and merged with Weedon Lois to form Weston and Weedon.
