= Glendon, Northamptonshire =

Glendon
- Lost Settlement
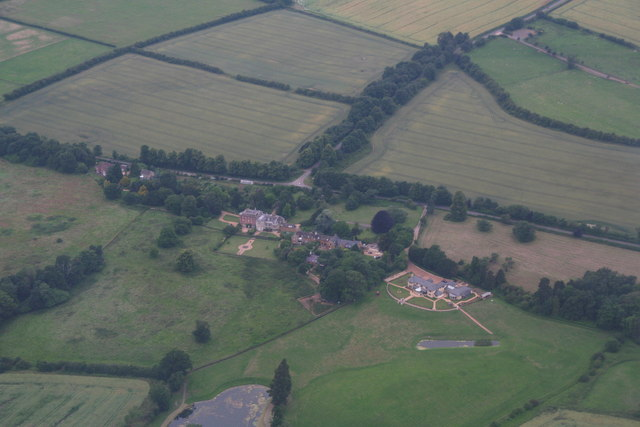

- Glendon within Northamptonshire
- Coordinates: 52°25′30″N 0°45′30″W
- Country: England
- County: Northamptonshire
- Region: East Midlands
- District: North Northamptonshire
- Municipality: Rushton
- Map Ref: SP847814

Glendon is a deserted village in the English county of Northamptonshire. Its location was on land to the east of Glendon Hall, now within the parish of Rushton, in the North Northamptonshire district. Neighbouring towns include Rothwell, Kettering, Rushton and Desborough.

== History ==
The village has a reference and is first recorded in the Domesday Book as Clenedone, where it is recorded that it had a population of 14. The name derives from the Old English words clǣne, meaning 'clean' and dūn, meaning 'hill'. The village is also mentioned by name in the Nomina Villarum of both 1316 and 1327. At these times, it was recorded that there were ten tenants in the manor. By 1428, records show that there were only ten inhabitants left in the village. In the year 1514, what remained of the village was enclosed by Robert Malory and nine of the ten dwellings left in the village were demolished, the land given over to the rearing of sheep for the growing woolen trade. Glendon Hall and Home Farm are the only buildings remaining today. There are no traces left of the village as most of the land around the hall has been landscaped, although there is a sign of earthworks in the form of a long deeply hollowed channel, running east from the hall, that was once the main street through the village. The village's story was featured in the first episode of the 2006 series of Time Team, which featured efforts to find the parish church of St Helen's, which they concluded had been incorporated into Glendon Hall c. 1514 as a chapel and later demolished.

== Glendon parish ==
The civil parish of Glendon survived until 1935, covering Glendon Hall and Glendon Lodge, as well as Bunkers Hill Farm. It was merged into Rushton parish in on 1 April 1935. In 1931 the parish had a population of 40.

== Local tradition ==
It is said that one of the early owners of Glendon Hall, Sir William Lane, unexpectedly left his wife, Dame Margaret, in the middle of the night and thundered off on horseback on a mysterious assignation. He never returned, and was subsequently found murdered near Pytchley, some miles to the south. Thus, it was believed in the early 20th century that the hall was haunted by Sir William's ghost, which accounted for an all-pervading sadness and melancholic atmosphere at the place.

== Fiction ==
The Duke of Glendon's Regiment is a fictitious infantry regiment in the 1944 wartime propaganda film The Way Ahead. David Niven stars as Lieutenant Perry, leading new recruits drawn from all walks of life on overseas active service for the first time. The regimental nickname in the film was 'The Dogs,' short for 'Duke of Glendon.'
