= Hinton, Northamptonshire =

Village in Northamptonshire, England

Coordinates: 52.168°N 1.217°W

Hinton
- Location within Northamptonshire
- OS grid reference: SP5352
- Civil parish: Woodford cum Membris
- Unitary authority: West Northamptonshire
- Ceremonial county: Northamptonshire
- Region: East Midlands
- Country: England
- Sovereign state: United Kingdom
- Post town: Daventry
- Postcode district: NN11
- Dialling code: 01327
- Police: Northamptonshire
- Fire: Northamptonshire
- Ambulance: East Midlands
- UK Parliament: Daventry
- Website: Woodford cum Membris

Hinton is a village about 6.5 miles (10.5 km) south of Daventry in Northamptonshire. The village is the largest settlement in the civil parish of Woodford cum Membris, the others being the village of Woodford Halse and hamlet of West Farndon.

== History ==
A 14th- or 15th-century Medieval ampulla inscribed "Our Lady of Walsingham" has been found west of the village, off the footpath to Byfield. It would have been used for holy water or holy oil.

Hinton manor house was built late in the 17th century. Its southwest side retains its original appearance but the southeast side has been georgianised with a regular façade of five bays. It is a Grade II* listed building.

Hinton Inclosure Act 1753
- Act of Parliament
- Parliament of Great Britain
- Long title: An Act for dividing and enclosing the Common, Open, and Arable Fields, Meadows, and Waste Grounds, in the Hamlet of Hinton, in the Parish of Woodford cum membris, in the County of Northampton.
- Citation: 26 Geo. 2. c. 15 Pr.)
- Territorial extent: Great Britain

Dates
- Royal assent: 17 April 1753
- Commencement: 11 January 1753 (Note: Start of session.)

Status: Current legislation

The open field system of farming around Hinton was ended by enclosure via the Hinton Inclosure Act 1753 (26 Geo. 2. c. 15 Pr.). Much of the ridge and furrow pattern of the common fields is still visible, and is best preserved northwest of the village.

=== Railway ===
For 67 years Woodford and Hinton were notable for the extensive railway centre of Woodford Halse on the Great Central Railway's main line to London. The line and Woodford and Hinton railway station opened on 15 March 1899. British Railways renamed the station Woodford Halse on 1 November 1948. As well as a station there was a four-way railway junction, a major locomotive depot and extensive marshalling yards. BR closed the station and line on 5 September 1966.

== Amenities ==
Hinton's Church of England parish church is St Mary the Virgin, Woodford Halse.

Hinton has a Methodist church, which is a member of Banbury Methodist Circuit.

== Sources ==
- Pevsner, Nikolaus; Cherry, Bridget (1973) [1961]. Northamptonshire. The Buildings of England. Harmondsworth: Penguin Books. p. 468. ISBN 0-14-071022-1.
- RCHME, ed. (1981). An Inventory of the Historical Monuments in the County of Northamptonshire. Vol. 3, Archaeological Sites in North-West Northamptonshire. London: Her Majesty's Stationery Office. pp. 201–204.
