= Woodford cum Membris =

Civil parish in Northamptonshire, England

Coordinates: 52°10′00″N 1°13′30″W

Woodford cum Membris is a civil parish in Northamptonshire, England. It includes the villages of Woodford Halse and Hinton and the hamlet of West Farndon. The 2011 Census recorded the parish population as 3,393.

Since local government changes in 2021 it is part of West Northamptonshire. Before 2021 and after the 1974 reorganisation of local government, the parish had been part of the Daventry District. Before that it was part of Daventry Rural District.
