= West Farndon =

Hamlet in Northamptonshire, England

Coordinates: 52.1589°N 1.2283°W

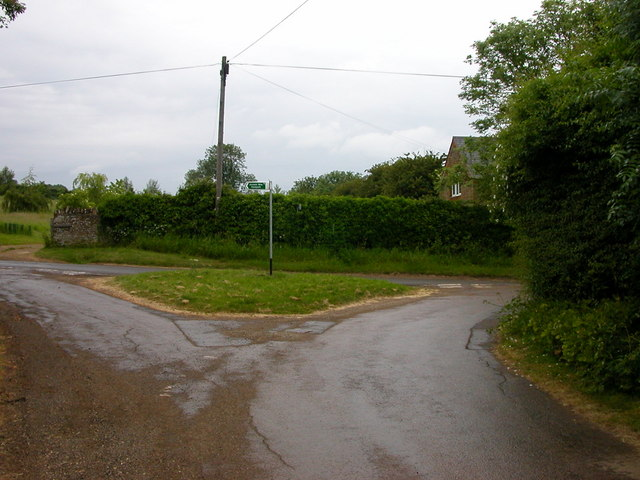
- A road at West Farndon

- Location within Northamptonshire
- OS grid reference: SP528515
- Civil parish: Woodford cum Membris
- Unitary authority: West Northamptonshire
- Ceremonial county: Northamptonshire
- Region: East Midlands
- Country: England
- Sovereign state: United Kingdom
- Post town: Daventry
- Postcode district: NN11
- Dialling code: 01327
- Police: Northamptonshire
- Fire: Northamptonshire
- Ambulance: East Midlands
- UK Parliament: Daventry
- Website: Woodford cum Membris

West Farndon is a hamlet and deserted medieval village in West Northamptonshire, England. It is about 3/4 mile (1.2 km) southwest of Hinton, in the civil parish of Woodford cum Membris.

== Archaeology and history ==
Sherds of second- and third-century Roman pottery have been found west of the present hamlet, indicating the site of a Roman settlement.

The Domesday Book of 1086 records two small manors at West Farndon. Surviving earthworks east and south of the present hamlet show the extent of the former village. The Eydon Inclosure Act 1760 (1 Geo. 3. c. 10 Pr.) ended West Farndon's open field system of farming; by 1840 much of the former village was deserted. Much of the ridge and furrow pattern of the common fields is still visible.

== Amenities ==
The Jurassic Way long distance footpath passes through West Farndon.

== Sources ==
- Adkins, W.R.D.; Serjeantson, R.M., eds. (1902). A History of the County of Northampton. Victoria County History. Vol. 1. Westminster: Archibald Constable & Co.
- RCHME, ed. (1981). An Inventory of the Historical Monuments in the County of Northamptonshire. Vol. 3, Archaeological Sites in North-West Northamptonshire. London: Her Majesty's Stationery Office. pp. 201–204.
