= Great Houghton, Northamptonshire =

Village in Northamptonshire, England

Coordinates: 52.22275°N 0.841141°W

Great Houghton
- Location within Northamptonshire
- Population: 651 (2021)
- OS grid reference: SP79115886
- Unitary authority: West Northamptonshire
- Ceremonial county: Northamptonshire
- Region: East Midlands
- Country: England
- Sovereign state: United Kingdom
- Post town: Northampton
- Postcode district: NN4
- Dialling code: 01604
- Police: Northamptonshire
- Fire: Northamptonshire
- Ambulance: East Midlands
- Website: Great Houghton Parish Council

Great Houghton is a village and civil parish in the West Northamptonshire unitary authority area of Northamptonshire, England. The village lies on the edge of Northampton, on the A428 Bedford Road, around 2.5 miles (4 km) east-southeast of the town centre. The population of the civil parish at the 2021 census was 651.

The name "Houghton" means "hill-spur farm/settlement". The village has two pubs and a large village hall and playing fields. It was also the home of Great Houghton School, a private day school which closed in 2014.

The village was struck by an F1/T2 tornado on 23 November 1981, as part of the record-breaking nationwide tornado outbreak on that day.
