= Clay Coton =

Village in Northamptonshire, England

Coordinates: 52.387°N 1.129°W

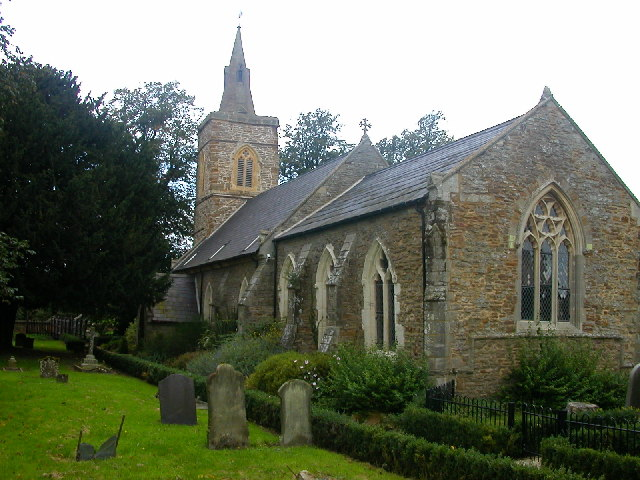
- Former Church of St Andrew

- Location within Northamptonshire
- Population: 271 (2011)
- OS grid reference: SP5977
- Civil parish: Clay Coton
- Unitary authority: West Northamptonshire
- Ceremonial county: Northamptonshire
- Region: East Midlands
- Country: England
- Sovereign state: United Kingdom
- Post town: Northampton
- Postcode district: NN6
- Dialling code: 01788
- Police: Northamptonshire
- Fire: Northamptonshire
- Ambulance: East Midlands
- UK Parliament: Daventry

Clay Coton is a village and civil parish in the West Northamptonshire district, in the ceremonial county of Northamptonshire, England. The population (including Elkington and Stanford-on-Avon) of the civil parish at the 2011 census was 271. The nearest large town is Rugby, Warwickshire, about 7 miles (11.3 km) away by road. The village is close to the M1 motorway with its junction (known as Catthorpe Interchange with the M6 and A14 road which runs very close to the north.

The village is dominated by the mediaeval former church of St. Andrew. Built in 1340, it was restored by Edmund Francis Law in 1866 but fell into disuse in the 1950s and was renovated as a private house in 2000. However, the surrounding graveyard still has public access.
