= Pilton, Northamptonshire =

Hamlet in Northamptonshire, England

Coordinates: 52.4490°N 0.5002°W

Pilton
- Location within Northamptonshire
- OS grid reference: TL0284
- Civil parish: Pilton, Stoke Doyle and Wadenhoe
- Unitary authority: North Northamptonshire
- Ceremonial county: Northamptonshire
- Region: East Midlands
- Country: England
- Sovereign state: United Kingdom
- Post town: Peterborough
- Postcode district: PE8
- Dialling code: 01832
- Police: Northamptonshire
- Fire: Northamptonshire
- Ambulance: East Midlands
- UK Parliament: Corby and East Northamptonshire

Pilton is a hamlet and civil parish in North Northamptonshire, England. The population is included in the civil parish of Wadenhoe.

The hamlets name means 'Pileca's farm/settlement'.
