= Hardwick, Northamptonshire =

Village in Northamptonshire, England

Coordinates: 52.320°N 0.755°W

Hardwick
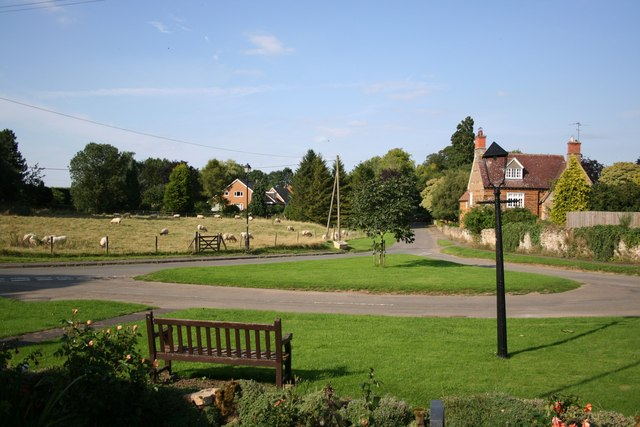
- The village green

- Location within Northamptonshire
  - London: 69.8 miles (112.3 km)
- Unitary authority: North Northamptonshire
- Ceremonial county: Northamptonshire
- Region: East Midlands
- Country: England
- Sovereign state: United Kingdom
- Post town: WELLINGBOROUGH
- Postcode district: NN9
- Dialling code: 01933
- Police: Northamptonshire
- Fire: Northamptonshire
- Ambulance: East Midlands
- UK Parliament: Wellingborough

Hardwick is a small village in North Northamptonshire, England, close to the town of Wellingborough. The population is included in the civil parish of Great Harrowden.

The village's name means "herd farm".

== Gallery ==
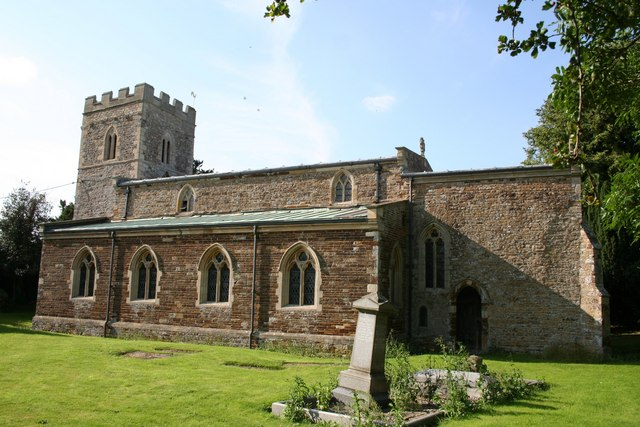
St.Leonard's Church

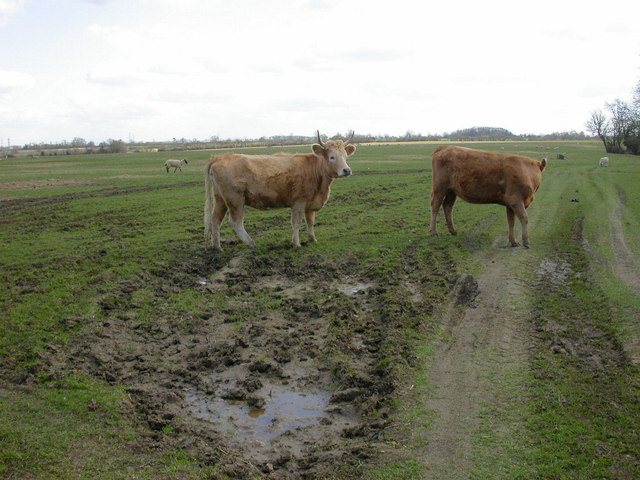
Heifers and sheep

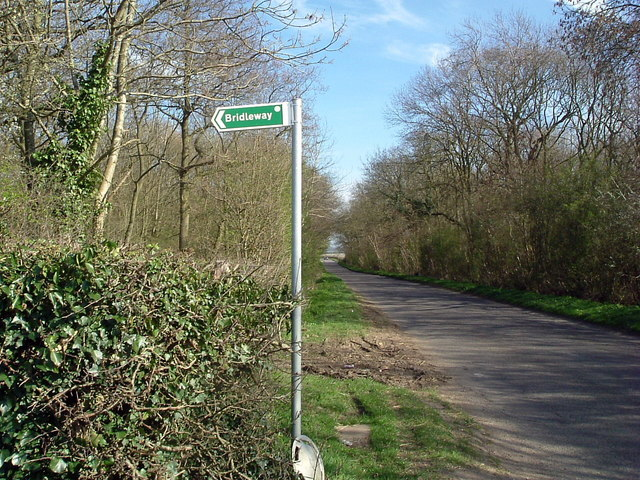
Withmale park wood

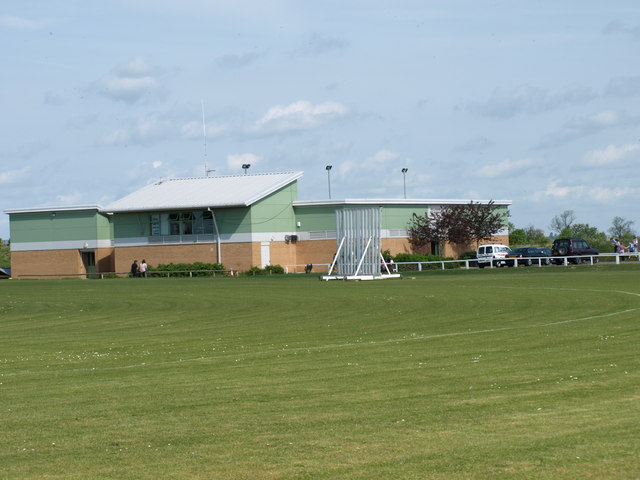
Old Grammarians Clubhouse
