= Little Addington =

Village in Northamptonshire, England

- Location within Northamptonshire
- Population: 328 (2011 census)
- OS grid reference: SP9573
- Unitary authority: North Northamptonshire
- Ceremonial county: Northamptonshire
- Region: East Midlands
- Country: England
- Sovereign state: United Kingdom
- Post town: Kettering
- Postcode district: NN14
- Dialling code: 01933
- Police: Northamptonshire
- Fire: Northamptonshire
- Ambulance: East Midlands
- UK Parliament: Corby and East Northamptonshire

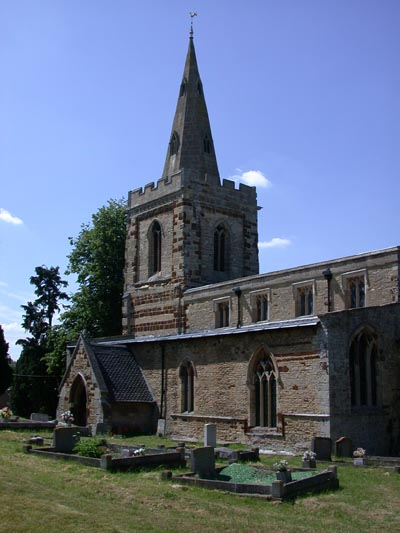
Church: Church of St. Mary, Little Addington, UK

Little Addington is a village and civil parish in North Northamptonshire, England, about 8 miles (13 km) south-east of Kettering. At the time of the 2011 census, the parish's population was 328 people. Prior to local government restructuring in 2021 the village was in the area of East Northamptonshire District Council.

The villages name means 'Farm/settlement connected with Eadda/Aeddi'.

== Church ==
The village church is dedicated to St Mary and dates from the late 13th to mid 14th century. It was restored in 1857 by Northampton architect E F Law.

== Heritage assets ==
The following buildings and structures are listed by Historic England as of special architectural or historic interest.

- Roman Villa (Scheduled) Unknown date 52.35731°N 0.58521°W
- Church of St Mary (Grade I) 13th century 52.35176°N 0.59354°W
- Manor Farmhouse (Grade II) 17th century 52.35121°N 0.59233°W
- Hill Farmhouse (Grade II) 17th century 52.35065°N 0.59468°W
- Chancel Cottage (Grade II) 17th century 52.35211°N 0.59304°W
- Vine Cottage (Grade II) 17th century 52.35105°N 0.59356°W
- Stoneycroft (Grade II) 18th century 52.35249°N 0.59434°W
- Church Hill Cottage (Grade II) 18th century 52.35132°N 0.59336°W
- Surrenden House (Grade II) 18th century 52.35152°N 0.59531°W
- Barn, Manor Farmhouse (Grade II) 18th century 52.35126°N 0.59204°W
- Little Addington House (Grade II) 19th century 52.35073°N 0.59283°W
- War Memorial (Grade II) 20th century 52.35203°N 0.59337°W

== Demography ==
- In 1801 there were 212 persons
- In 1831 there were 264 persons
- In 1841 there were 229 persons
- In 2011 there were 328 persons
