= Luddington-in-the-Brook =

Village in Northamptonshire, England

Coordinates: 52.4385°N 0.3757°W

Luddington in the Brook
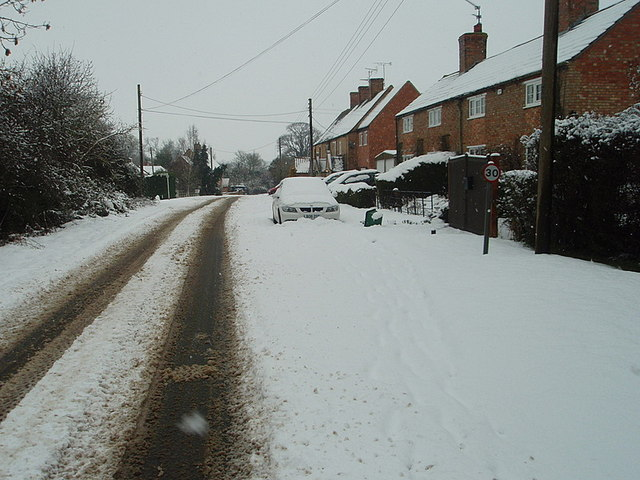
- Village street in winter

- Location within Northamptonshire
- Population: 64 (2021 census)
- OS grid reference: TL1083
- Civil parish: Luddington
- Unitary authority: North Northamptonshire
- Ceremonial county: Northamptonshire
- Region: East Midlands
- Country: England
- Sovereign state: United Kingdom
- Post town: Peterborough
- Postcode district: PE8
- Dialling code: 01832
- Police: Northamptonshire
- Fire: Northamptonshire
- Ambulance: East Midlands
- UK Parliament: Corby and East Northamptonshire

Luddington-in-the-Brook or Luddington in the Brook is a village in the North Northamptonshire district, in the ceremonial county of Northamptonshire, England. The name of its civil parish is Luddington. In 2021 the parish had a population of 64. From 1974 to 2021 it was in East Northamptonshire district.

The village's name means 'farm/settlement connected with Lulla'.

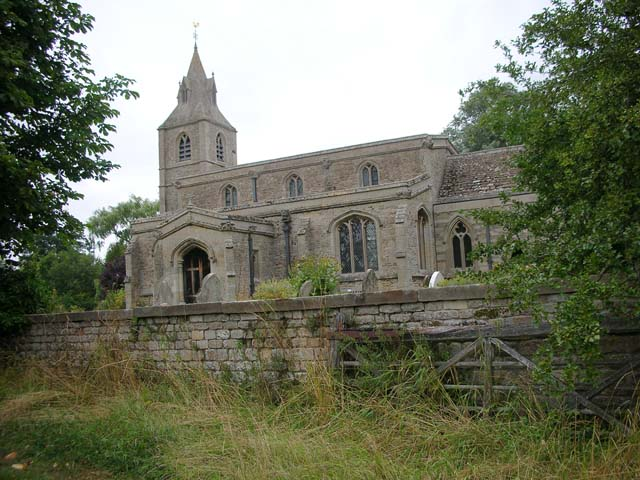
Church of St Margaret

St. Margaret's Church, a Gothic Revival building designed by Richard Carpenter, is Grade II listed.
