= Oundle and Thrapston Rural District =

Local government area in the UK, abolished 1974

Coordinates: 52.5°N 0.47°W

Oundle and Thrapston was a rural district in Northamptonshire, England from 1935 to 1974.

It was formed in 1935 under the County Review Order as a merger of the Easton on the Hill Rural District, the Gretton Rural District, and the parts of the Oundle Rural District and the Thrapston Rural District which were in Northamptonshire.

It was abolished in 1974 under the Local Government Act 1972 and now forms part of the North Northamptonshire Unitary Authority.
