= Woodnewton =

Village in Northamptonshire, England

Coordinates: 52.5385°N 0.4754°W

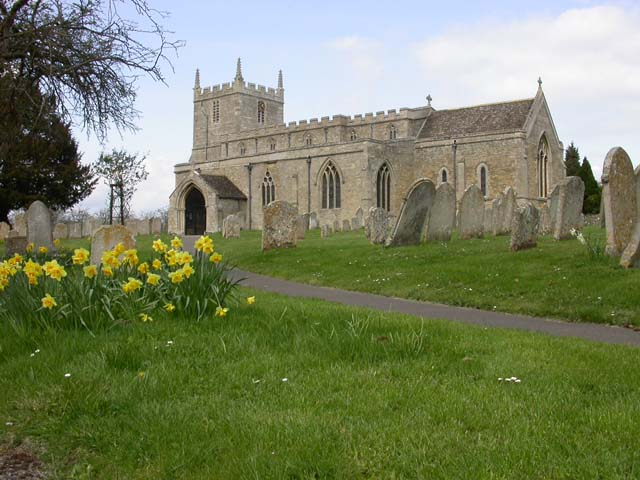
- St Mary's Church, Woodnewton

- Location within Northamptonshire
- Population: 450 (2011)
- OS grid reference: TL0394
- Unitary authority: North Northamptonshire
- Ceremonial county: Northamptonshire
- Region: East Midlands
- Country: England
- Sovereign state: United Kingdom
- Post town: Peterborough
- Postcode district: PE8
- Dialling code: 01780
- Police: Northamptonshire
- Fire: Northamptonshire
- Ambulance: East Midlands
- UK Parliament: Corby and East Northamptonshire

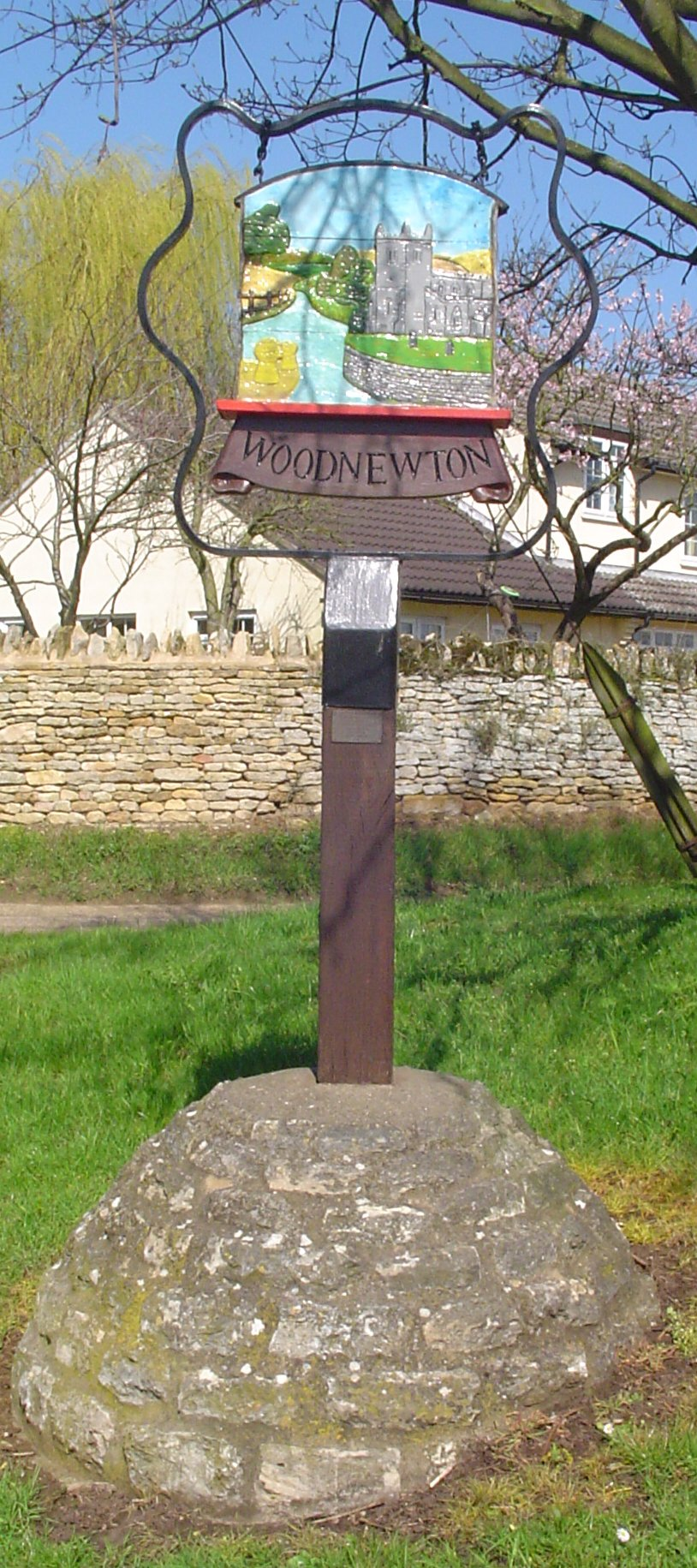
Village sign of Woodnewton

Woodnewton is a village in Northamptonshire, England. Essentially a pair of parallel streets, the village lies to the north of a small stream, the Willow Brook, in Rockingham Forest. It is in North Northamptonshire. At the time of the 2001 census, the parish's population was 442 people, increasing slightly to 450 at the 2011 Census.

The village's name means 'New farm/settlement'. The village is situated in the Forest of Cliffe, so 'wood' was added to signify that.

Woodnewton is home to 'Clownfest', a fundraising operation inspired by Coco the Clown. There is a woodcarved statue of 'Coco the clown' in the Woodnewton village park. Coco the clown is buried in the graveyard of St Mary's parish church, which is situated to the western end of the village. Clownfest raised enough money to pay for the building of the current village hall, which is a central hub for the village.

Other facilities include: Public House, Village hall, Church and a Pottery.
