= Preston Capes =

Village in Northamptonshire, England

Coordinates: 52.1858°N 1.1604°W

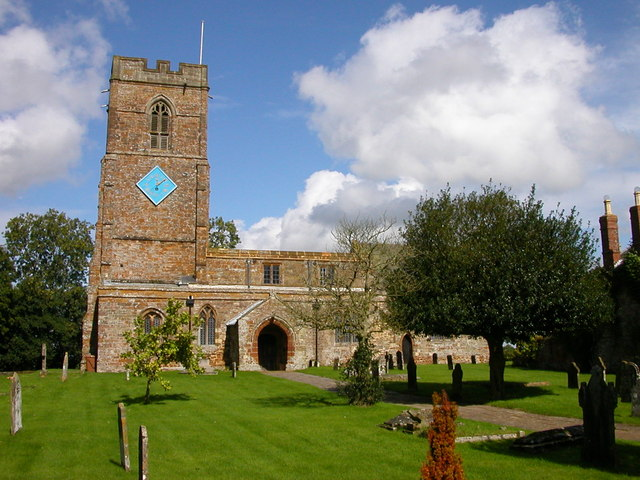
- St Peter and St Paul's Church in Preston Capes

- Location within Northamptonshire
- Population: 216 (2011)
- OS grid reference: SP5754
- Unitary authority: West Northamptonshire
- Ceremonial county: Northamptonshire
- Region: East Midlands
- Country: England
- Sovereign state: United Kingdom
- Post town: Daventry
- Postcode district: NN11
- Dialling code: 01327
- Police: Northamptonshire
- Fire: Northamptonshire
- Ambulance: East Midlands
- UK Parliament: Daventry

Preston Capes is a village and civil parish in West Northamptonshire in England. The population, including Canons Abbey, at the 2011 census was 216, up from 188 at the 2001 census.

The village's name means "Priest Farm/Settlement". The village was owned by Hugo filius Nicholai de Capes in 1234.

The Church of England parish church is dedicated to St Peter and St Paul.
