= Hartwell, Northamptonshire =

Coordinates: 52.147°N 0.854°W

Hartwell
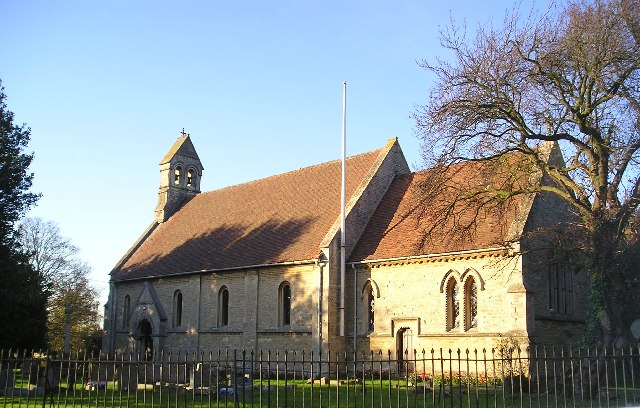
- St John the Baptist Parish Church Hartwell built ca 1851

- Location within Northamptonshire
- Interactive map of Hartwell
- Population: 1,815; 1,875 (2011 census)
- OS grid reference: SP7850
  - London: 62 miles (100 km)
- Civil parish: Hartwell
- Unitary authority: West Northamptonshire
- Ceremonial county: Northamptonshire
- Region: East Midlands
- Country: England
- Sovereign state: United Kingdom
- Post town: NORTHAMPTON
- Postcode district: NN7
- Dialling code: 01604
- Police: Northamptonshire
- Fire: Northamptonshire
- Ambulance: East Midlands
- UK Parliament: South Northamptonshire

Hartwell is a village and civil parish in West Northamptonshire, England, bordering Buckinghamshire. The village is next to Salcey Forest and the M1 motorway. It is 7 miles (11 km) south of Northampton and 13 miles (21 km) north of Milton Keynes.

The villages name means 'Hart spring/stream'.

== Demographics ==
According to the 2001 census, the parish had a population of 1,815 people in 693 household,. increasing to 1,875 at the 2011 census. Men in the Salcey ward had the fifth highest life expectancy at birth, 89.3 years, of any ward in England and Wales in 2016.

Within the village are Hartwell Parish Church, Hartwell CofE Primary School, the Rose and Crown public house, community centre, recreational ground, village shop and the Hartwell Club.

== Governance ==
Hartwell is in the South Northamptonshire constituency for Parliamentary elections, and is represented by former Leader of the House of Commons, Andrea Leadsom. For elections to the West Northamptonshire Council, the village is in the Hackleton and Grange Park ward. Both are considered safe-seats for the Conservative Party, though the Liberal Democrats also have a strong base locally.

== Hartwellians ==
- Isaac Wake (1580–1632), diplomat, political commentator, and ambassador of the Court of St James's to Savoy and France

== See also ==
- Hartwell, Buckinghamshire, a village in the Vale of Aylesbury
