= Northampton Rural District =

Former local government area in the UK

Coordinates: 52.2°N 0.85°W

Coat of arms of Northampton Rural District Council

Northampton was a rural district in Northamptonshire, England from 1894 to 1974.

It was created under the Local Government Act 1894 based on the Northampton rural sanitary district. In 1932, under a County Review order, it took in the disbanded Hardingstone Rural District and two parishes from Pottersbury Rural District.

The district was abolished in 1974 under the Local Government Act 1972. Part of it was added to the new Northampton district, with the rest going to form the new district of South Northamptonshire.
