= Yarwell =

Village in Northamptonshire, England

Coordinates: 52°33′54″N 0°25′49″W

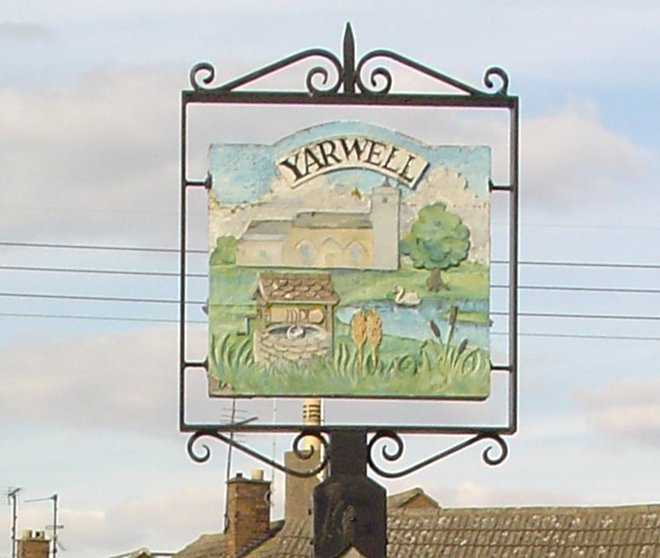
- Village sign

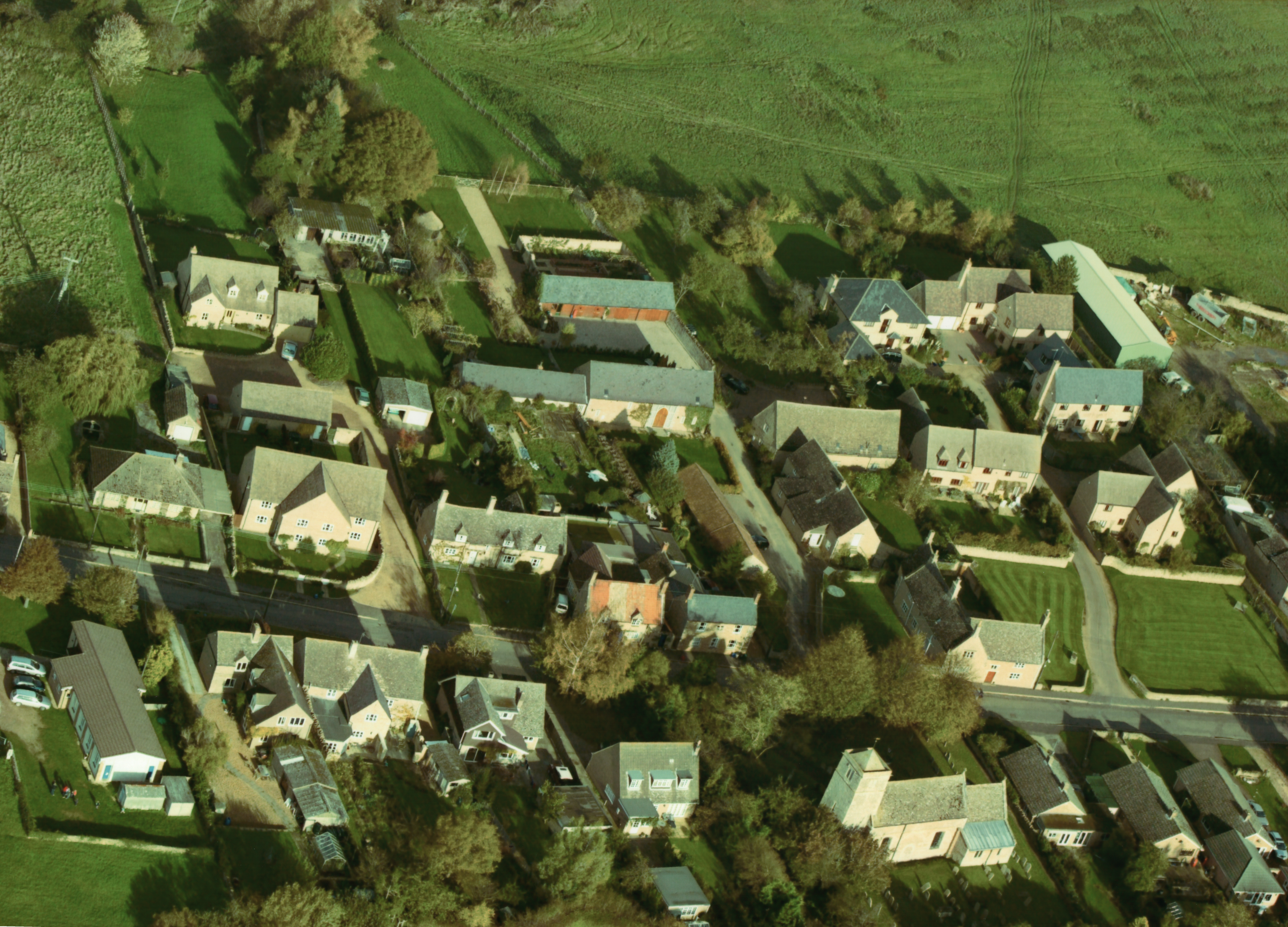
- Aerial view

- Location within Northamptonshire
- Population: 294 (2011)
- OS grid reference: TL0697
- Unitary authority: North Northamptonshire
- Ceremonial county: Northamptonshire
- Region: East Midlands
- Country: England
- Sovereign state: United Kingdom
- Post town: Peterborough
- Postcode district: PE8
- Dialling code: 01780
- Police: Northamptonshire
- Fire: Northamptonshire
- Ambulance: East Midlands
- UK Parliament: Corby and East Northamptonshire

Yarwell is a village on the River Nene in the extreme east of the English county of Northamptonshire near the border with Cambridgeshire. Yarwell is one mile north of Nassington, 7 1/2 miles (12.1 km) west of Peterborough and its county town of Northampton is 30 miles (48 km) to the south-west. The name Yarwell is derived from 'the spring where the yarrow grows'. At the time of the 2001 census, the parish's population was 316 people, reducing to 294 at the 2011 Census.

The village's name origin is dubious. 'Fish-weir spring/stream' or maybe, 'yarrow grass spring/stream'. It has been thought that the second component could be the Old English 'wael' meaning 'pool'.

Yarwell was not recorded in the Domesday Book, however, it probably was recorded as part of Nassington. During the Middle Ages, the village was surrounded by the Rockingham Forest. The village was never large, in 1580 it was recorded as having 39 houses, and in 1801 it was recorded as containing 58 families.

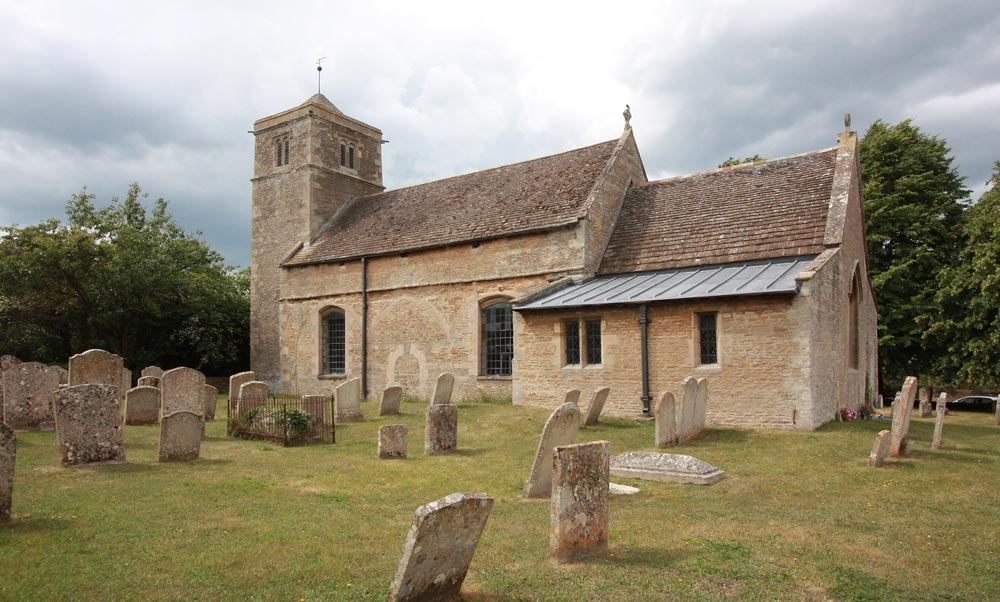
Church and graveyard at Yarwell

Yarwell has a pub called The Angel Inn. The village is also home to a village hall and the 13th-century Church of St. Mary Magdalene. The majority of the church building is original with walls made of limestone rubble with freestone dressings however the west tower was rebuilt probably in the 17th century. Until 1892, the church's roof was thatched.

One of the village's two farms has been converted into a housing development and the other has applied for planning permission. Until recently, there was a Methodist church in the village; the post office closed in 1993. The village school closed in the early 1960s and in 2003 was redeveloped into three houses. In total there are about 130 houses in Yarwell.

Yarwell and Nassington Britannia band is the local brass band which rehearses in the village hall and draws its players from the surrounding area including Stamford and Oundle.

The preserved Nene Valley Railway has a station at Yarwell Junction. Before closure in the 1960s, this was the junction of two lines, one from Market Harborough and the other from Northampton. It is on the Cambridgeshire side of the Nene at grid reference TL078970. Also nearby is Old Sulehay, a historical hunting forest now managed as a reserve.
