= Sudborough =

Village in Northamptonshire, England

Coordinates: 52.4320°N 0.5821°W

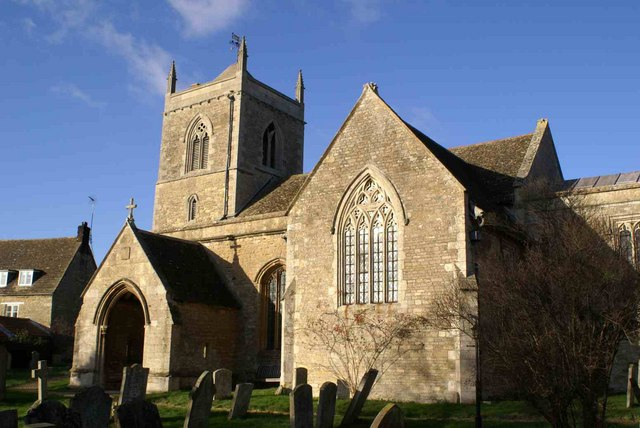
- All Saints Church

- Location within Northamptonshire
- Population: 202 (2011)
- OS grid reference: SP9682
- Unitary authority: North Northamptonshire
- Ceremonial county: Northamptonshire
- Region: East Midlands
- Country: England
- Sovereign state: United Kingdom
- Post town: Kettering
- Postcode district: NN14
- Dialling code: 01832
- Police: Northamptonshire
- Fire: Northamptonshire
- Ambulance: East Midlands
- UK Parliament: Corby and East Northamptonshire

Sudborough is a village and civil parish in North Northamptonshire. At the time of the 2001 census, the parish's population was 189 people, increasing to 202 at the 2011 Census.

The village's name means 'Southern fortification'.

Sudborough is bypassed by the A6116 road and is in the boundaries of the ancient Rockingham Forest; its nearest town is Thrapston, 3 miles (4.8 km) to its south-east.

The Church of England parish church is dedicated to All Saints.
