= Daventry Rural District =

Former local government area in the UK

Coordinates: 52.3°N 1.15°W

Daventry RD
- History
  - Created: 1894
  - Abolished: 1974
  - Succeeded by: Daventry district
- Status: Rural district
  - HQ: Daventry

The Daventry Rural District was a rural district in Northamptonshire, England from 1894 to 1974. It entirely surrounded the municipal borough of Daventry. The district was administered from Daventry but did not include the town.

It was formed under the Local Government Act 1894 based on Daventry rural sanitary district. It was expanded in 1935, by a County Review Order, by taking over the parishes of the former Crick Rural District.

In 1974, under the Local Government Act 1972, the district was abolished, being merged with Daventry and with most of Brixworth Rural District to form a new district of Daventry.
