= Thornby, Northamptonshire =

Village in Northamptonshire, England

Coordinates: 52.3734°N 1.0101°W

Thornby
- Location within Northamptonshire
- Population: 189 (2011)
- OS grid reference: SP6775
- Unitary authority: West Northamptonshire
- Ceremonial county: Northamptonshire
- Region: East Midlands
- Country: England
- Sovereign state: United Kingdom
- Post town: Northampton
- Postcode district: NN6
- Dialling code: 01604
- Police: Northamptonshire
- Fire: Northamptonshire
- Ambulance: East Midlands
- UK Parliament: Kettering

Thornby is a village and civil parish in West Northamptonshire in England. It has a Manor house. At the time of the 2001 census, the parish's population was 162 people, increasing to 189 at the 2011 Census. The village is bisected by the A5199 (formerly A50) road between Northampton and Leicester and about 11 miles (17.7 km) north-west of Northampton town centre. It is about 1½ miles (2½ km) south of a junction with the A14 road which joins the M1 Motorway and M6 junction at Catthorpe with Felixstowe, Suffolk.

The village's name means 'farm/settlement with thorn trees'.

== Notable buildings ==
The parish church is dedicated to St. Helen and is described by Pevsner as of little architectural interest. It dates from the 14th century and additions and re-building took place in 1870 by E F Law.

Thornby Hall is located off Naseby road and carries 17th century, with 19th- and 20th-century additions, for its Tudor style. The house and grounds were used as a school for young people with severe emotional and behavioural problems, as a result of attachment difficulties which may have been rooted in early life trauma. It is now closed and been sold. In 2017, Thornby Hall became home to Nagarjuna Kadampa Meditation Centre, a Kadampa Buddhist community and public meditation centre.

Stone House is c. 1700 and Thornby Grange was built in 1911 in the Stuart style.
