= Denford =

Village in Northamptonshire, England

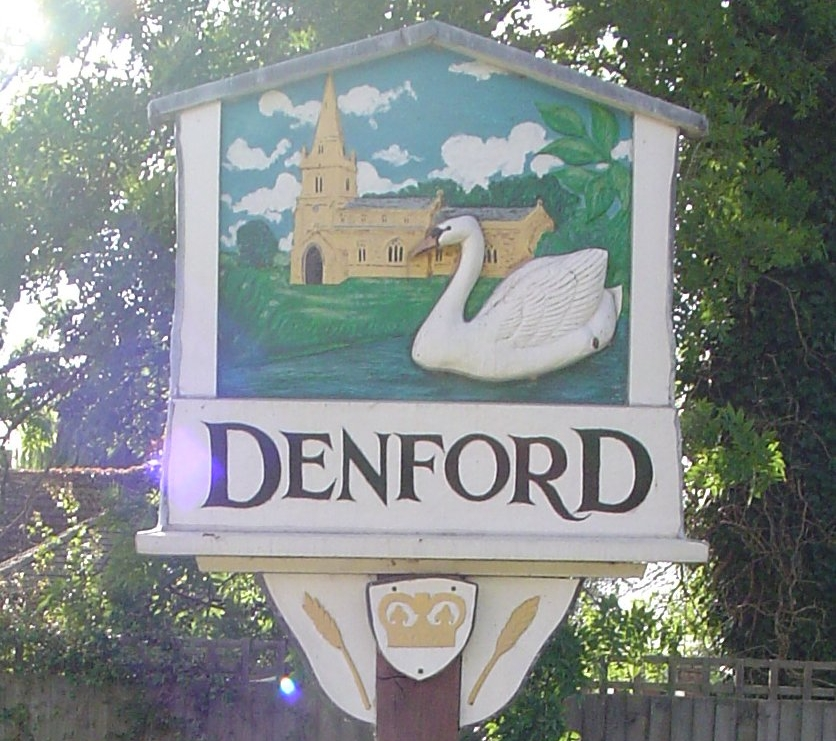
- Village sign

- Location within Northamptonshire
- Population: 282 (2011)
- OS grid reference: SP9977
- Unitary authority: North Northamptonshire
- Ceremonial county: Northamptonshire
- Region: East Midlands
- Country: England
- Sovereign state: United Kingdom
- Post town: Kettering
- Postcode district: NN14
- Dialling code: 01832
- Police: Northamptonshire
- Fire: Northamptonshire
- Ambulance: East Midlands
- UK Parliament: Corby and East Northamptonshire

Denford is a small village and civil parish situated in North Northamptonshire, England. At the time of the 2001 census, the parish population was 250 people, increasing to 282 at the 2011 census.

The village’s name means 'valley ford'. The village stands on the river Nene. It is in this area that the pronunciation of its name changes: upstream, to the south, it pronounced nen, while downstream to the north it is neen.

== History ==
Denford is recorded in the Domesday Book of 1086. The manor of Denford was held by the Bishop of Coutances, and later by the de Clare family before settling by 1262 in the ownership of the Earls of Gloucester. They let the Denford estates to a series of families, including the Chamberlains and the Reades.

== Heritage assets ==
The following buildings and structures are listed by Historic England as of special architectural or historic interest.

- Church of The Holy Trinity (Grade I) 13th century 52.37871°N 0.54489°W
- Chest Tomb near Church of The Holy Trinity (Grade II) 16th century 52.37863°N 0.54457°W
- The Cock Public House (Grade II) 16th century 52.37848°N 0.54581°W
- Manor Farmhouse (Grade II) 17th century 52.37742°N 0.54423°W
- 1 Freemans Lane (Grade II) 17th century 52.37984°N 0.54127°W
- The Cottage (Grade II) 17th century 52.3783°N 0.54348°W
- 1, 2 and 3 Meadow Lane (Grade II) 17th century 52.37911°N 0.54345°W
- The Shires (Grade II) 17th century 52.37833°N 0.54370°W
- Denford North Lodge (Grade II) 18th century 52.38012°N 0.51195°W
- 5, 7 and 9 Denford Road (Grade II) 18th century 52.36533°N 0.54956°W
- Debdale Cottage (Grade II) 18th century 52.37820°N 0.54450°W
- War Memorial (Grade II) 20th century 52.38026°N 0.54168°W

== Demography ==
- In 1801 there were 267 persons
- In 1831 there were 319 persons
- In 1841 there were 329 persons
- In 2001 there were 250 persons
- In 2011 there were 282 persons
