= Sutton Bassett =

Village in Northamptonshire, England

Coordinates: 52.5053°N 0.8657°W

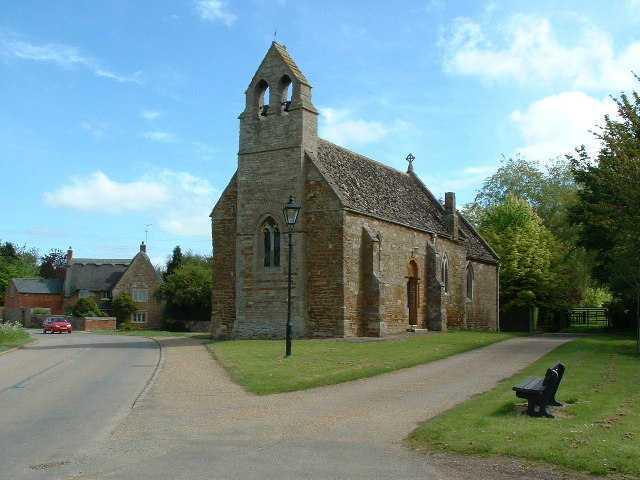
- All Saints' Parish Church

- Location within Northamptonshire
- OS grid reference: SP770903
- Unitary authority: North Northamptonshire
- Ceremonial county: Northamptonshire
- Region: East Midlands
- Country: England
- Sovereign state: United Kingdom
- Post town: Market Harborough
- Postcode district: LE16
- Dialling code: 01858
- Police: Northamptonshire
- Fire: Northamptonshire
- Ambulance: East Midlands
- UK Parliament: Kettering

Sutton Bassett is a village and civil parish in Northamptonshire, England, in the Welland valley. It was formerly in the Corby Hundred but has been part of the Stoke Hundred (named after Stoke Albany village).

The village's name means 'Southern farm/settlement'. The village was held by Richard Basset in the 12th century.

Sutton Bassett's church, The Church of All Saints (which partly dates back to the Norman period) was built as an annexe to St. Mary's Church in the nearby village of Weston by Welland. Unlike the majority of typical English countryside village churches, it has no graveyard. The local pub was the Queen's Head Inn, which closed in January 2015.

Sutton Bassett is currently administered by North Northamptonshire council but was administered as part of the Borough of Kettering until changes in 2021, and is roughly 14 miles north-west of Kettering, 12 miles west of Corby, 7 miles north-east of Desborough and roughly 4 miles from Market Harborough.
