= Orton, Northamptonshire =

Village in Northamptonshire, England

Coordinates: 52.4076°N 0.8181°W

Orton
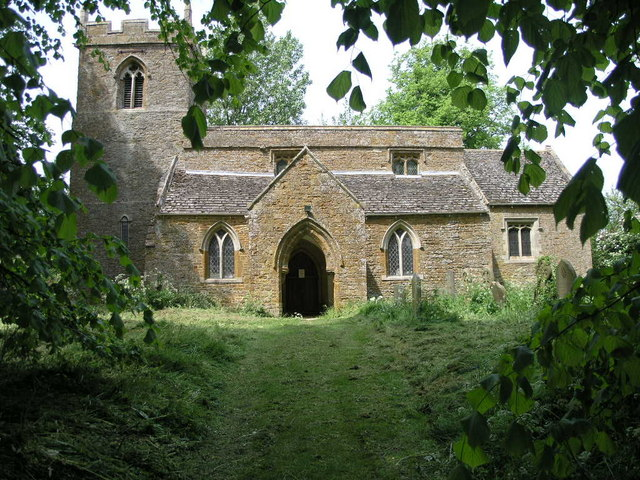
- Former parish church of All Saints

- Location within Northamptonshire
- OS grid reference: SP8079
- Civil parish: Orton
- Unitary authority: North Northamptonshire
- Ceremonial county: Northamptonshire
- Region: East Midlands
- Country: England
- Sovereign state: United Kingdom
- Post town: Kettering
- Postcode district: NN14
- Dialling code: 01536
- Police: Northamptonshire
- Fire: Northamptonshire
- Ambulance: East Midlands
- UK Parliament: Kettering
- Website: Loddington Parish Council

Orton is a village and civil parish about 3 miles (5 km) west of Kettering, in North Northamptonshire, England.

The villages name means 'Higher farm/settlement' or 'ridge farm/settlement'.
