= Marholm =

Village in Cambridgeshire, England

Coordinates: 52.6°N 0.3°W

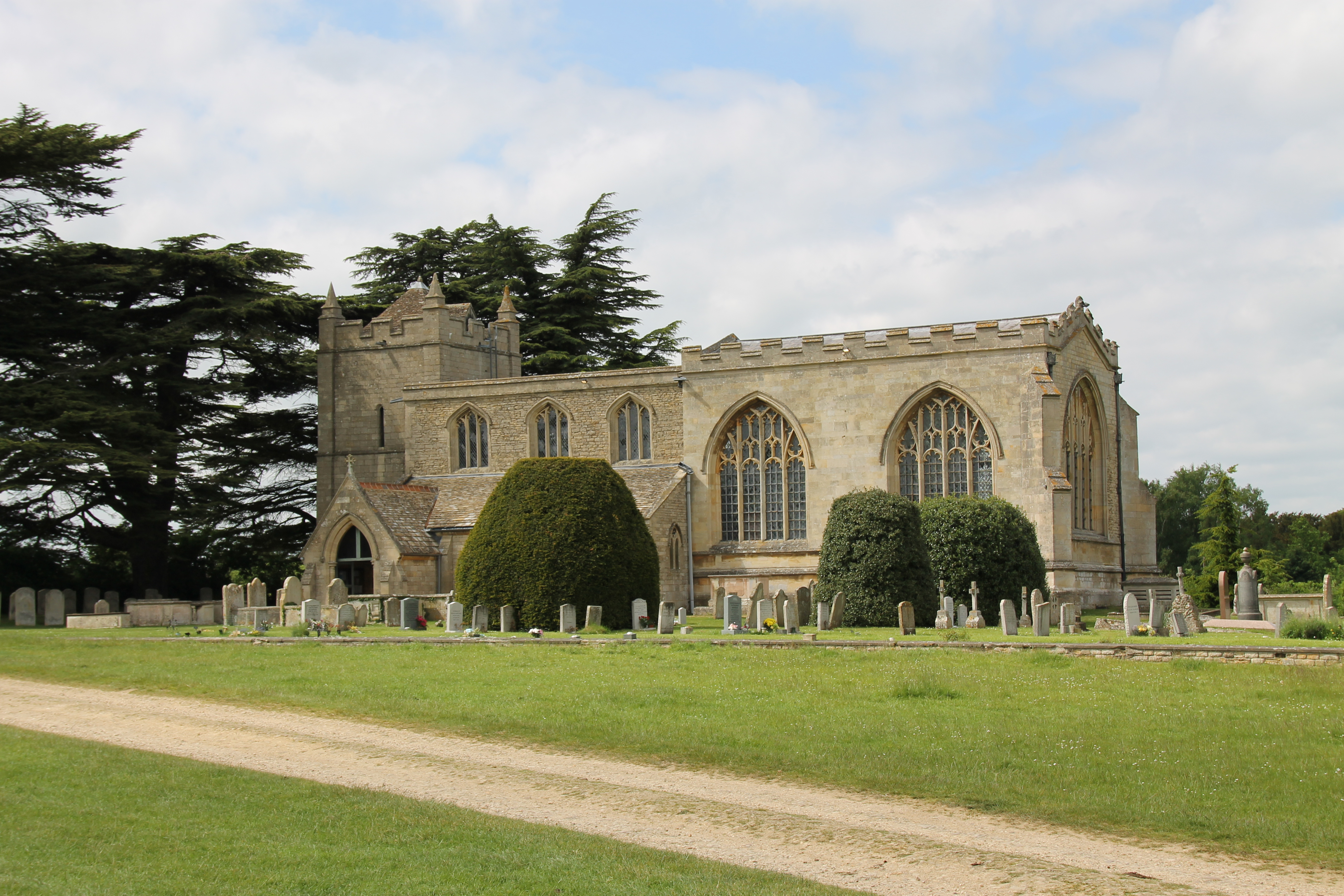
- St Mary's Church, Marholm

- Location within Cambridgeshire
- Population: 151 United Kingdom Census 2011
- Civil parish: Marholm
- Unitary authority: Peterborough
- Ceremonial county: Cambridgeshire
- Region: East
- Country: England
- Sovereign state: United Kingdom
- Post town: Peterborough
- Postcode district: PE6
- Police: Cambridgeshire
- Fire: Cambridgeshire
- Ambulance: East of England
- UK Parliament: North West Cambridgeshire

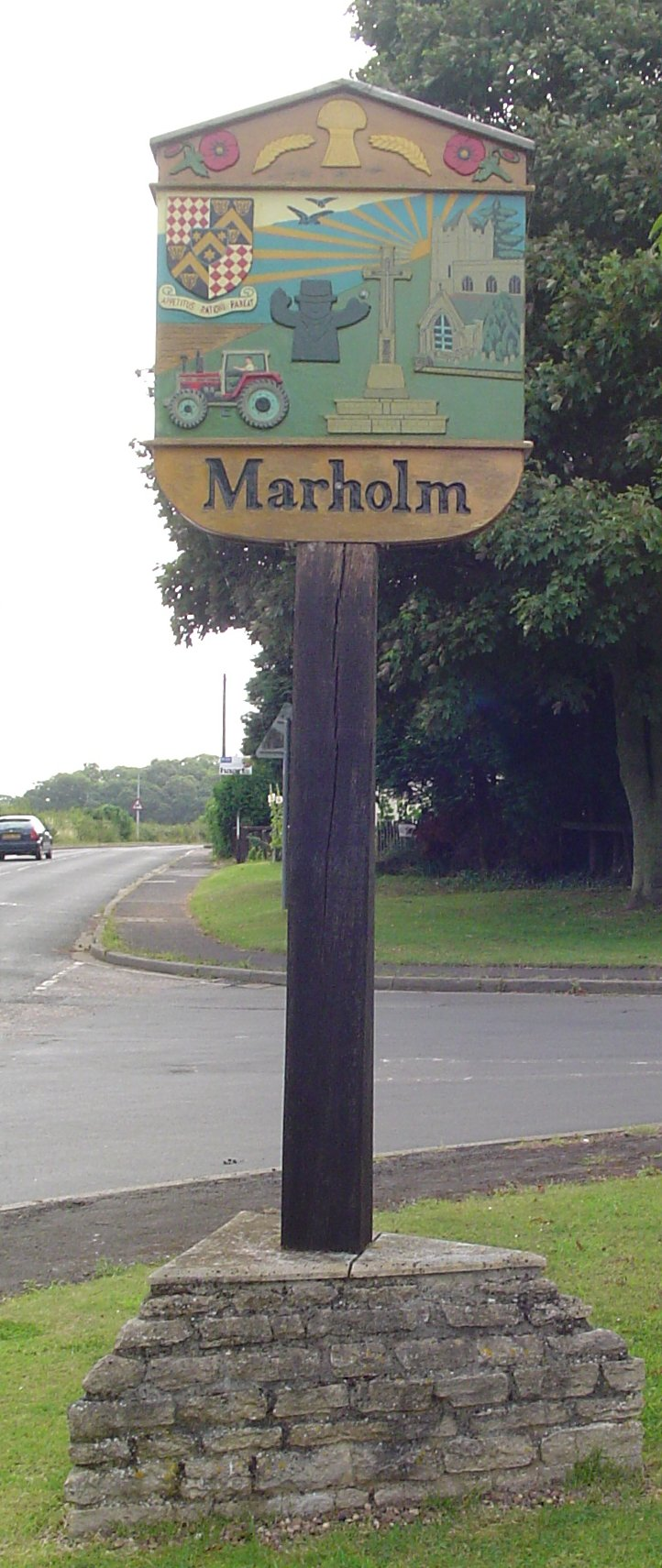
Village sign in Marholm

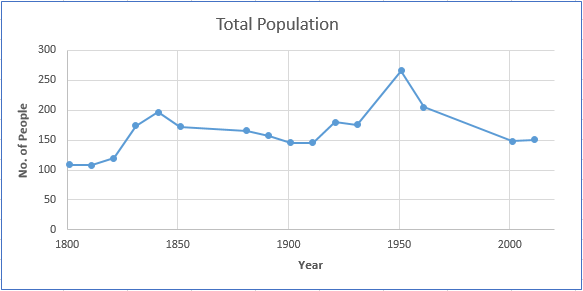
Total Population of Marholm Civil Parish, Cambridgeshire as reported by the Census from 1801-2011

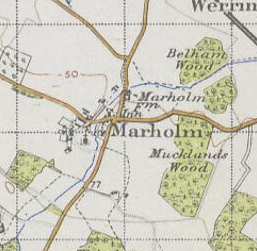
20th-century map of Marholm

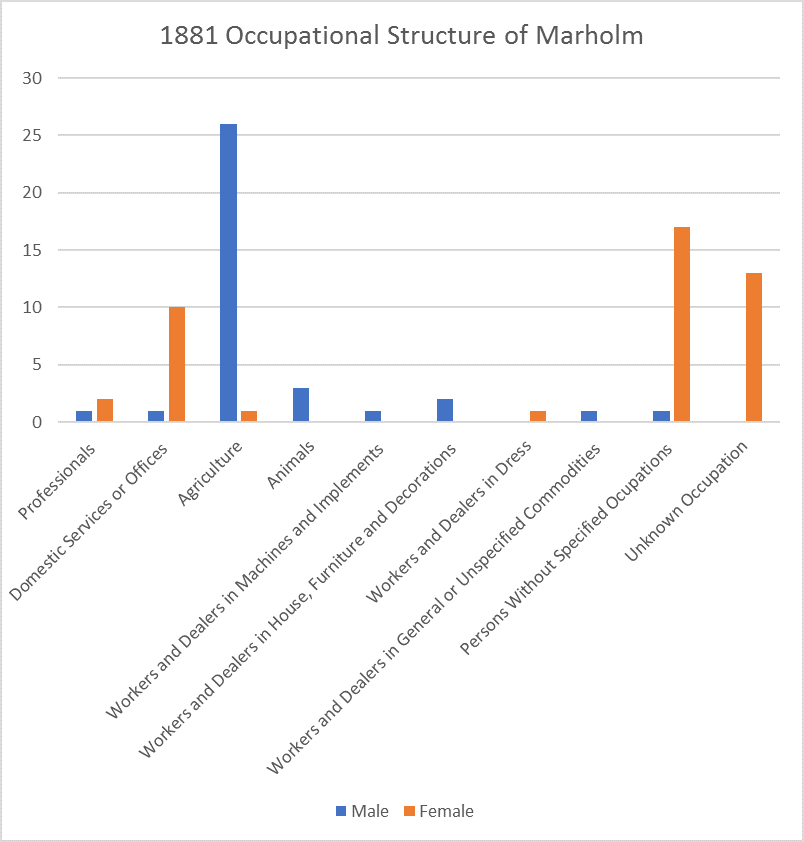
Occupational structure of males and females in Marholm, taken from the Census data from 1881

Marholm is a village and civil parish in the Peterborough district, in the ceremonial county of Cambridgeshire, England. West of Peterborough and 1 mile from the seat of the Fitzwilliam family at Milton Hall. The parish covers some 1,400 acres, with the village positioned roughly in the centre. For electoral purposes it forms part of Northborough ward in North West Cambridgeshire constituency.

According to the 2011 census there were 76 males and 75 females living in the parish.

Peterborough Crematorium, a holder of the prestigious Green Flag Award, is located in approximately 26 acres (10.52 ha) of land in the parish, much of it left as original ancient woodland. Located just north is Woodcroft Castle.

== History ==
In 1870-72, John Marius Wilson's Imperial Gazetteer of England and Wales described Marholm like this:

MARHOLM, a parish in Peterborough district, Northampton; adjacent to the Great Northern railway, 4½ miles NW by N of Peterborough r. station. Post town, Peterborough. Acres, 1,790. Real property, £1,534. Pop., 172. Houses, 33. The property belongs chiefly to the Hon. G. W. Fitzwilliam. The living is a rectory in the diocese of Peterborough. Value, £311. * Patron, the Hon. G. W. Fitzwilliam. The church is partly Norman, partly early English, partly later English; consists of nave and chancel, with porch and tower; and contains monuments of the Fitzwilliams. There are alms houses with £14 a year.

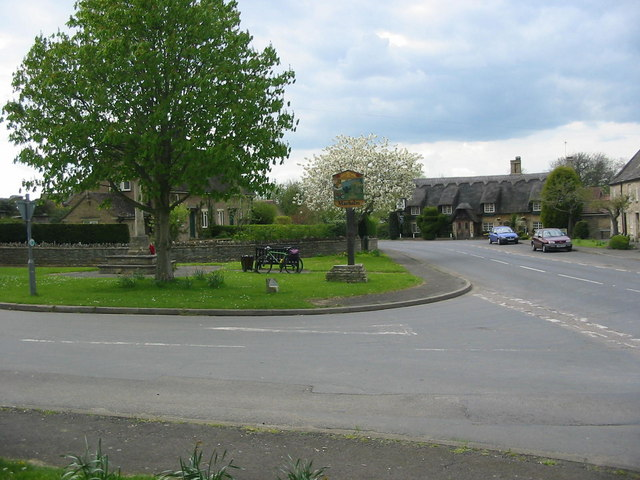
Marholm Village Centre

=== Marholm Church ===
Marholm Church, otherwise known as the Church of St Mary, is a Grade I listed building. The earliest known alterations to the church can be dated to 1534 by Sir William Fitzwilliam of Milton (Sheriff of Northamptonshire in 1524) when the chancel was re-built.

=== Marholm Farmhouse ===
Marholm Farmhouse is a Grade II* listed building. It is a thatched building made from coursed stone rubble. The date 1633 is carved into the stone below the roof however there is evidence to suggest the origins of the building could date even earlier, particularly the recessed windows.

The Farm has been occupied by the Darby family since 1912. The Darby family are one of the oldest tenants to the Fitzwilliam estate and are traceable to nearly 400 years ago on the Castor register.

=== Home Farmhouse ===
Home Farmhouse is a Grade II listed building. It was listed in 1955. It is very similar to Marholm Farmhouse, again it is a thatched building made from coursed stone rubble with flush quoins.

Home Farm was initially run to meet the domestic needs of Milton rather than primarily for income. In the 20th century it was used as a mixed farm and after the First World War began a period of dairy farming that ceased in 1998.

== Demographics ==
=== Population ===
The population of the last two centuries (1801-2011) has shown a steady rise and subsequent fall of total population in Marholm. This trend is also true in within both the 19th and 20th centuries. In 1801 the population of Marholm was recorded to be 109, by 1851 this figure had risen to 172 only to have fallen back down to 146 by 1901. The trend continues in the 20th century. Between 1901 and 1951 Marholm saw its biggest increase in population during any period in the last two centuries with the population peaking at its highest with 266, however fast forward 60 years to 2011 the population has reverted almost to levels recorded in 1901 with 151 people counted.

According to the 2011 census 13% of the population are aged 0–17, 68% aged between 18-74, and 19% are aged 75+. The average ages is 51 years old.

=== Ethnicity ===
According to the 2011 census, 98% of the population is White British & Irish. The remainder 2% is made up of White and Black Caribbean. Ethnicity figures are very similar in the 2001 Census with 97% of the population being White British & Irish.

=== Employment ===
The largest sector in employment in 1881 for males was agriculture with 26. This was most expected as the parish covers some 1,400 acres and has always retained an agricultural community. Although over the last 50 years the domination of agriculture has diminished Marholm still retains its rural feel. In contrast with the most recent 2011 occupational census data (although fields are very different from the ones used in 1881) we see a large proportion has moved away from agriculture and into tertiary sector jobs, 44% of the Marholm population work in office related jobs. A large proportion of the female population in 1881 were recorded with either unknown of unspecified occupations with 13 and 17 respectively.

=== Housing ===
Marholm is a small village surrounded by inhabited countryside. Typical housing in the area is detached, semi-detached and flats, with property prices regarded as 'average to high'. The 2017 average value for property in Marholm is £419,382 with a 2.91% increase from values 12 months ago. Over the last 10 years Marholm's properties have increased by 14.45%. Prices in Marholm are higher than the averages shown in other nearby villages with Glinton showing an average of £204,833, whilst the average value in Upton is £255,361.

=== Education ===
The closest primary school is Watergall Primary School located 1.9 miles away from Marholm. In their most recent Ofsted report the school was founded to 'require improvement' in a number of areas, despite being surrounded by a number of alternative primary schools it still manages to attract an intake of 200 pupils. The nearest secondary school is Ken Stimpson Community School, Ofsted recently found the school as 'good' and it is located 6.3 miles from Marholm.
