= Mawsley =

Village in Northamptonshire, England

Coordinates: 52.37500°N 0.81292°W

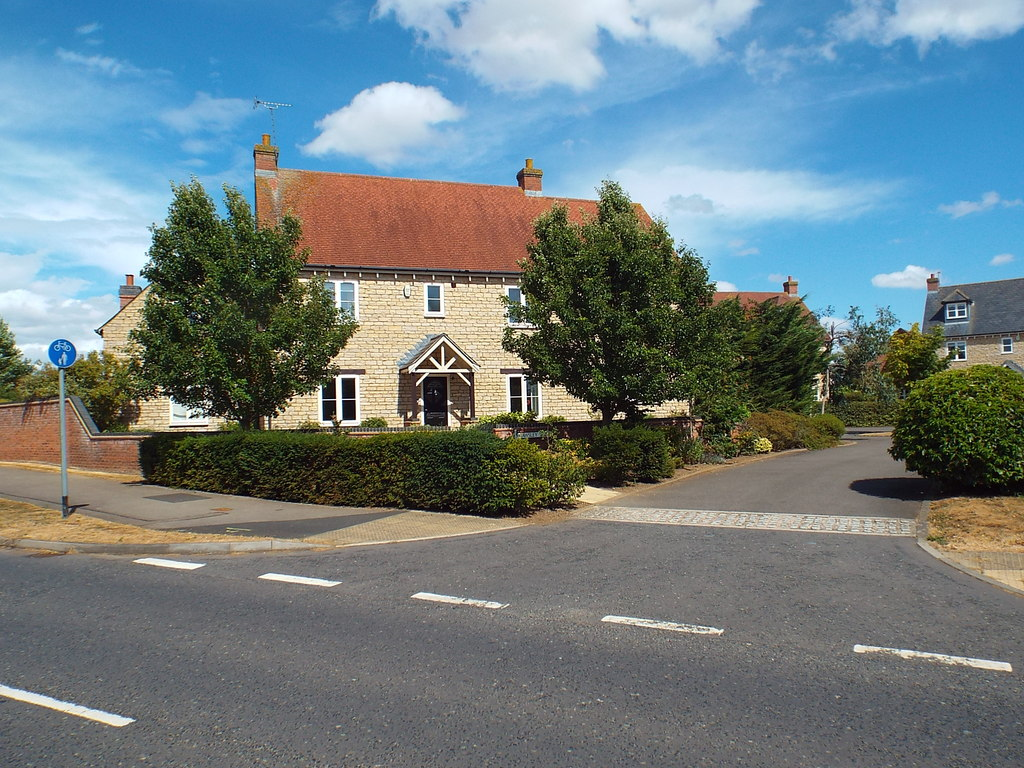

- Location within Northamptonshire
- Population: 2,320 (2011 census)
- OS grid reference: SP8778
- Unitary authority: North Northamptonshire
- Ceremonial county: Northamptonshire
- Region: East Midlands
- Country: England
- Sovereign state: United Kingdom
- Post town: Kettering
- Postcode district: NN14
- Dialling code: 01536

Mawsley is a newly built village and civil parish in North Northamptonshire, England. At the time of the 2011 census, the parish had a population of 2,320.

== History ==
The village's name means 'Gravel ridge wood/clearing'. The Domesday hundred of Mawsley was combined with Orlingbury hundred in the 13th century. The site of the meeting-place is unknown.

Until 1 April 2004, Mawsley was part of the nearby parish of Cransley.

Mawsley was first planned in 1993 by Northamptonshire County Council, and construction began in 2001. The village is very nearly complete, with a school, doctors surgery and village hall all provided by the developers.

"Mawsley was built not far from the site of a medieval lost village of the same name, which went out of use by the 1600s." The lost village was in 1086 the site of the hundred court of the ancient domesday hundred of Mawsley. But the Hundred of Mawsley was annexed to a neighboring hundred; the twenty-nine Domesday hundreds of Northamptonshire were amalgamated into just nineteen hundreds by 1800. The old village became almost untraceable.

A Roman villa was found nearby, as well as other archaeological evidence. In the 1940s there were still two occupied bungalows with the registered address of The Bungalows, Mawsley but these disappeared around 1950. These bungalows could be accessed via Mawsley Lane leading from Loddington.

When the new village was planned, a site was set aside for the building of a public house. The site was sold in 2006 to a company to build and run the pub. As of 2018 this is no longer the plan. Mr C Clayson has since purchased the site and despite much local opposition to the development and planning permission being declined several times, upon appeal to the Secretary of State, permission was granted.

The current proposal is an Over-50s apartment block of 29 apartments with 26 parking spaces aimed at the over 55 who don't drive.There are currently 3 buses a day.

Since planning permission was granted, the plot is now up for sale for offers over £1.4 million. As of June 2024, the plot is still for sale with planning due to run out in July 2024. Some rudimentary footings have been dug to keep planning permission and a length of ancient hedgerow removed in the process.

The Centre at Mawsley is currently the place residents use as a social area. There is a small park, large playing fields along with a sports hall, which can be hired out for various events along with communal bar area.

Local access to the village is via an unclassified road (known locally as the C31/Mawsley Road), which is now approved for gritting in the winter along its entire length by the local council.

The roads, excluding Broughton Road, are still unadopted by the local authority with no Section 38 agreement in place.
