= Sulby, Northamptonshire =

Hamlet in Northamptonshire, England

Coordinates: 52.4186°N 1.0295°W

Sulby
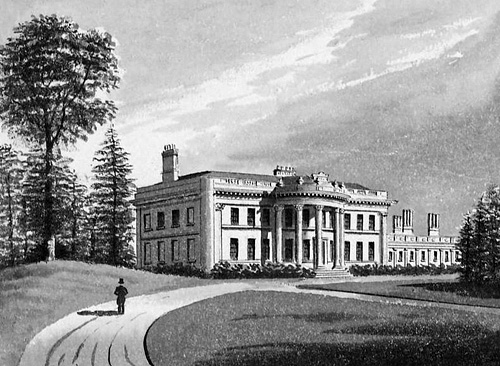
- Sulby Hall (demolished 1952)

- Location within Northamptonshire
- OS grid reference: SP661805
- Unitary authority: West Northamptonshire
- Ceremonial county: Northamptonshire
- Region: East Midlands
- Country: England
- Sovereign state: United Kingdom
- Post town: Northampton
- Postcode district: NN6
- Dialling code: 01858
- Police: Northamptonshire
- Fire: Northamptonshire
- Ambulance: East Midlands
- UK Parliament: Kettering

Sulby is a hamlet and civil parish in West Northamptonshire in England. The population of the hamlet at the 2011 Census is included in the civil parish of Sibbertoft.

The hamlet's name means 'farm/settlement of Sula', 'farm/settlement with a post' or 'farm/settlement in a gully'.

Sulby Reservoir lies to the south of the settlement.

Rene Payne (1734–1799) bought Sulby Hall in 1792. The writer Violette Graham (later Violette, Lady Greville) was born at the hall in 1842. The hall was demolished in 1952.
