= Weston, Northamptonshire =

Village in Northamptonshire, England

Coordinates: 52.1163°N 1.1398°W

Weston
- Location within Northamptonshire
- Population: 960 (2011)
- OS grid reference: SP589467
- Civil parish: Weston and Weedon
- Unitary authority: West Northamptonshire
- Ceremonial county: Northamptonshire
- Region: East Midlands
- Country: England
- Sovereign state: United Kingdom
- Post town: TOWCESTER
- Postcode district: NN12
- Police: Northamptonshire
- Fire: Northamptonshire
- Ambulance: East Midlands
- UK Parliament: South Northamptonshire

Weston is a village in West Northamptonshire, England. Together with neighbouring Weedon Lois (also known as Lois Weedon) it forms the civil parish of Weston and Weedon, which had a population of 960 at the 2011 Census.

Weston gives its name to Weston Hall, the home of writer Sir Sacheverell Sitwell from 1927 until his death in 1988.
