= Brampton Ash =

Village in Northamptonshire, England

Coordinates: 52.4798°N 0.8449°W

- Location within Northamptonshire
- OS grid reference: SP7887
- Unitary authority: North Northamptonshire
- Ceremonial county: Northamptonshire
- Region: East Midlands
- Country: England
- Sovereign state: United Kingdom
- Post town: Market Harborough
- Postcode district: LE16
- Dialling code: 01858
- Police: Northamptonshire
- Fire: Northamptonshire
- Ambulance: East Midlands
- UK Parliament: Kettering

Brampton Ash is a civil parish and village in Northamptonshire, England. It lies in the extreme north-west of Northamptonshire and the nearest urban settlements are the nearby towns of Corby, Kettering, Desborough and Market Harborough. Running past the north of the village is the A427 road which connects Market Harborough to Oundle. At the 2011 census the population of the village was included in the civil parish of Stoke Albany.

The villages name means 'Broom farm/settlement' with abundant 'Ash-trees'.

Within Brampton Ash are the remains of a stone quarry. The church of St. Mary the Virgin is the main feature of the village. It is floodlit at night and can be seen for miles around the Welland valley. Brampton Ash is in North Northamptonshire but before local government changes in 2021 was in the Borough of Kettering.

== Population ==
Historical population
Year	Pop.	±%
1801	79	—
1831	100	+26.6%
1841	104	+4.0%
1851	101	−2.9%
1861	107	+5.9%
1871	153	+43.0%
1881	120	−21.6%
1891	140	+16.7%
1901	112	−20.0%
1911	130	+16.1%
1921	122	−6.2%
1931	130	+6.6%
1951	173	+33.1%
1961	142	−17.9%
1971	140	−1.4%
1981	160	+14.3%
1991	66	−58.8%
