= Fineshade =

Historic locality and estate in Northamptonshire, England

Coordinates: 52.5650°N 0.5729°W

- Earthworks at the site of Fineshade Abbey and Castle Hymel

- Location within Northamptonshire
- Civil parish: Duddington-with-Fineshade
- Unitary authority: North Northamptonshire
- Ceremonial county: Northamptonshire
- Region: East Midlands
- Country: England
- Sovereign state: United Kingdom
- Post town: CORBY
- Postcode district: NN17
- Police: Northamptonshire
- Fire: Northamptonshire
- Ambulance: East Midlands
- UK Parliament: Corby and East Northamptonshire

Fineshade is a locality, former country estate and wooded landscape in the North Northamptonshire district, in the ceremonial county of Northamptonshire, England. It forms the southern part of the civil parish of Duddington-with-Fineshade and lies within the former Rockingham Forest, between Stamford and Corby.

== History ==
Fineshade was historically a chapelry, in 1858 Fineshade became a separate civil parish, on 1 April 1988 the parish was abolished and merged with Duddington to form "Duddington with Fineshade". At the 1971 census (one of the last before the abolition of the parish), Fineshade had a population of 46.

== See also ==
- Fineshade Priory
- Fineshade Wood
- List of monastic houses in Northamptonshire
