= Pytchley =

Village in Northamptonshire, England

Coordinates: 52.3619°N 0.7458°W

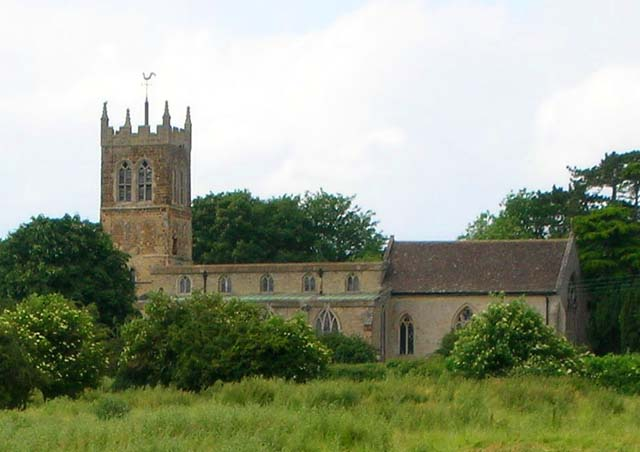
- Church of All Saints, Pytchley

- Location within Northamptonshire
- Population: 489 (2011 census)
- OS grid reference: SP8574
- Unitary authority: North Northamptonshire
- Ceremonial county: Northamptonshire
- Region: East Midlands
- Country: England
- Sovereign state: United Kingdom
- Post town: Kettering
- Postcode district: NN14
- Dialling code: 01536
- Police: Northamptonshire
- Fire: Northamptonshire
- Ambulance: East Midlands
- UK Parliament: Kettering

Pytchley is a village and civil parish in Northamptonshire, England, three miles south-west of Kettering and near the A14 road. At the time of the 2011 census, the parish's population was 489 people. The village has a Church of England Primary School, a church and a pub. The Pytchley Hunt is a famous fox hunt based near the village.

The village's name means 'wood/clearing of Peoht'.

The village lost its bus service in 2018.
