= Upper Heyford, Northamptonshire =

Village in Northamptonshire, England

Coordinates: 52.231°N 1.030°W

Upper Heyford
- Location within Northamptonshire
- Population: 77 Est. 2009
- OS grid reference: SP663596
- Unitary authority: West Northamptonshire
- Ceremonial county: Northamptonshire
- Region: East Midlands
- Country: England
- Sovereign state: United Kingdom
- Post town: NORTHAMPTON
- Postcode district: NN7
- Dialling code: 01327
- Police: Northamptonshire
- Fire: Northamptonshire
- Ambulance: East Midlands
- UK Parliament: Daventry

Upper Heyford is a village and civil parish 6 miles (9.7 km) west of Northampton, just before Weedon, Northamptonshire, England, not to be confused with one of the same name some 30 miles away across the county border in Oxfordshire. It sat along the former A45 road until a bypass opened on 15 November 2018, and is close 0.5 miles (0.8 km) by road to the M1 London to Yorkshire motorway junction 16, 72 miles (116 km) north of London and 38 miles (61 km) southeast of Birmingham. The village of Nether Heyford, with which it shares a primary school, church and other facilities, is about 0.5 miles (0.8 km) to the south.

== Notable buildings ==
Heyford Mill lies a little to the west, along the River Nene in a valley which separates the village and Nether Heyford. The mill was derelict but underwent extensive restoration and refurbishment in 2008. The Mill is mentioned in the Domesday Book. In November 2008, South Northants Council decided to serve a "planning enforcement notice" on the developer alleging failure to comply with planning permission. The council had previously served a court injunction against the developer to stop occupation of the property. The enforcement notice will require the demolition of the new buildings and other works on the historic site.

The mill fell into disuse in the 1960s. With the intention of saving its historic character, the Council granted planning permission in 2005 to restore and change the use of several derelict buildings at Heyford Mill after they had suffered arson and vandalism attacks. The site is in open countryside, part of the floodplain of the River Nene.
