= Brixworth Rural District =

Former local government area in the UK

Coordinates: 52.33°N 0.90°W

Brixworth RD
- History
  - Created: 1894
  - Abolished: 1974
  - Succeeded by: Daventry district
- Status: Rural district
  - HQ: Brixworth

The Brixworth Rural District was a rural district in Northamptonshire, England from 1894 to 1974. It was named after and administered from the village of Brixworth.

It was created by the Local Government Act 1894 from the Brixworth rural sanitary district. In 1935 it took in part of the disbanded Oxendon Rural District.

It was abolished in 1974 under the Local Government Act 1972, the bulk going to form part of the new district of Daventry.
