= Weston by Welland =

Village in Northamptonshire, England

Coordinates: 52.5159°N 0.8594°W

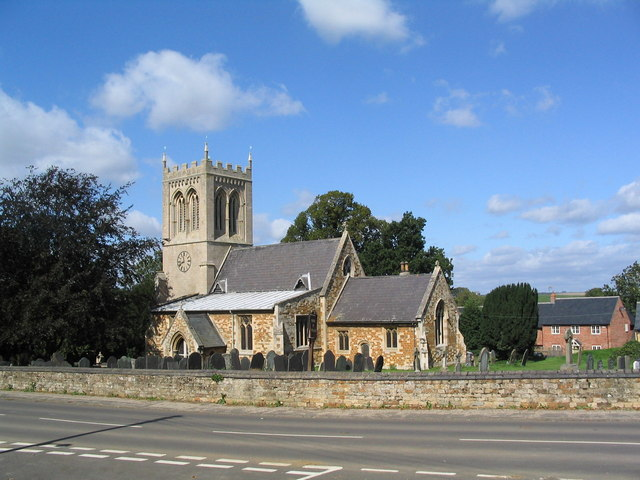
- Church of St Mary the Virgin at Weston by Welland photographed in September 2006

- Location within Northamptonshire
- Population: 246 (2011)
- OS grid reference: SP7791
- Unitary authority: North Northamptonshire
- Ceremonial county: Northamptonshire
- Region: East Midlands
- Country: England
- Sovereign state: United Kingdom
- Post town: Market Harborough
- Postcode district: LE16
- Dialling code: 01858
- Police: Northamptonshire
- Fire: Northamptonshire
- Ambulance: East Midlands
- UK Parliament: Kettering

Weston by Welland is a village and civil parish in the north of the English county of Northamptonshire administered as part of North Northamptonshire. As its name suggests, it is near to the River Welland that, thereabouts, forms the boundary with the county of Leicestershire. The Wheel & Compass pub stands on the village's outskirts. At the time of the 2001 census, the parish's population was 141 people, including Sutton Bassett and increasing to 246 at the 2011 Census.

The village's name means 'Western farm/settlement by the River Welland'.
