= Stoke Albany =

Village in Northamptonshire, England

Coordinates: 52.4795°N 0.8161°W

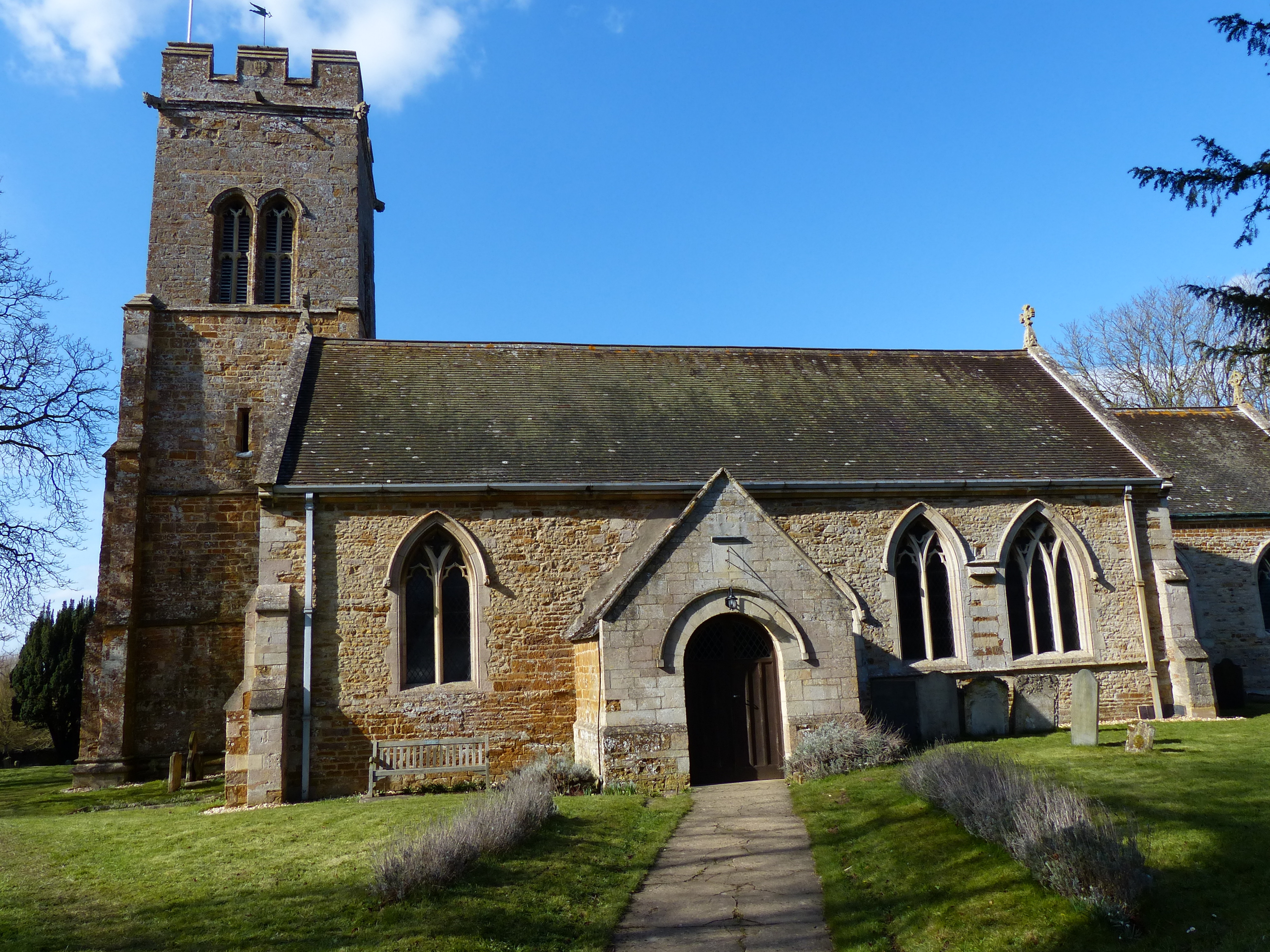
- St Botolph's Church, Stoke Albany

- Location within Northamptonshire
- Population: 390 (2011 Census)
- OS grid reference: SP8087
- Civil parish: Stoke Albany
- Unitary authority: North Northamptonshire
- Ceremonial county: Northamptonshire
- Region: East Midlands
- Country: England
- Sovereign state: United Kingdom
- Post town: MARKET HARBOROUGH
- Postcode district: LE16
- Dialling code: 01858
- Police: Northamptonshire
- Fire: Northamptonshire
- Ambulance: East Midlands
- UK Parliament: Kettering
- Website: Stoke Albany Parish Council

Stoke Albany is a village and civil parish in North Northamptonshire, England. It is off the A427 road between Market Harborough and Corby, about halfway between the two. At the 2011 Census, the population of the parish (including Brampton Ash and Little Bowden) was 390, an increase from 330 at the 2001 Census.

The village's name means 'outlying homestead/settlement'. The village was held by William de Albinni in 1155. The western piece of Corby hundred shaped a different hundred named 'Stoke'.

St Botolph's Church is a Grade II* listed building.
