= Grantham North services =

Road service area in Lincolnshire, England

Grantham North Services
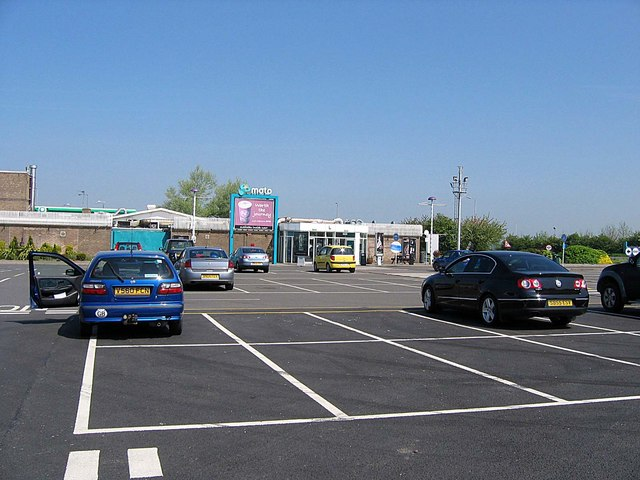
- The main services building

- Location within Lincolnshire

Information
- County: Lincolnshire
- Road: A1
- Coordinates: 52.9477°N 0.6788°W
- Operator: Moto Hospitality
- Date opened: 1 January 1964
- Website: moto-way.com/services/grantham-north/

Grantham North Services is a service area operated by Moto located on the A1 at Gonerby Moor Roundabout, four miles north of Grantham in Lincolnshire, England. The service station has a main car park and coach/lorry park, off which is a BP petrol station.

== History ==
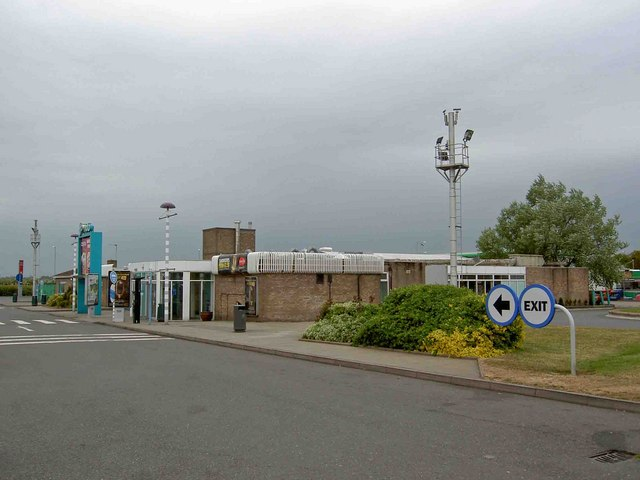
Main building

=== Tony's Cafe ===
Tony's cafe cost £120,000 in 1963 The planning for the new service area was discussed at a West Kesteven planning meeting in January 1963, with chairman Wing Commander Albert McCreary, of Hough-on-the-Hill.

The site opened on 1 January 1964. On the new Gonerby site would be a transport cafe, and a restaurant for the lounge suit and cardigan crowd, as the two groups of people, if using the same restaurant, would just make one another uncomfortable. The new plans for the 13-acre (5.3 ha) site included a motel; Tony Wakley had toured the US, to look at motels. He wanted to build a transport cafe to be more like a workers canteen.

The two owners were Anthony George Wakley (January 1921 – September 1997) and Phillip Edward Wakley. From around 1952, their previous site was known as Tony's Place; this former site served around 2,000 to 3,000 meals a day.

His mother, Alice, ran the cafe at night. Ministry of Transport figures found that around 30% of HGVs on the A1 stopped at Tony's Cafe; Tony's Cafe was almost as well known on the A1 as Watford Gap services was on the M1. In 1964, a breakfast at Tony's Cafe could cost 2s 3d, which was good value. The cafe was discussed in the House of Commons in February 1964 along with Farthing Corner and Newport Pagnell. The filling station would be built later. The site was 14 acres (5.7 ha), in a Swedish-style, with 26 staff.

The service area had many pint mugs go missing, as souvenirs, in 1967, so car drivers were only allowed half-pint mugs.

In 1968, Tony applied for a table drinks licence for the restaurant. and on 18 April 1968, Spitalgate licensing magistrates agreed to his application.

=== Trust House Forte ===
The site was owned by Trust House Forte in the 1980s and 1990s, under their Welcome Break group.

Forte opened the redeveloped site in early 1972 as Grantham Service Area. The Little Chef opened in September 1980; the Little Chef closed in 2008. The Granary Self Service opened in 1984, being open 24 hours, and seated 162. In 1985 the site served 2.5m people. It was known as Motor Chef in the 1980s; Motor Chef was started by THF in 1974; by 1979, there were 14 Motor Chefs across the country.

In the early 1970s, the site had a RAC service centre, with a transmitter on Gonerby Hill, and microwave direct link to Copt Oak, on the M1.

=== Redevelopment ===
The service area was much redeveloped in January 1986, to largely what it now is. It became Welcome Break from June 1988. All THF service stations became Welcome Break at the end of May 1988. Until then, Welcome Break had five service stations (former Ross), being headquartered at Leicester Forest East from 1984, being bought by THF for £190 million in July 1986.

== Transport ==
The service station is now accessed via a grade-separated junction on the A1 after the original Gonerby Moor roundabout was improved during 2008.

The Grantham South services (opened in September 1989) are at Colsterworth, also owned by Moto, and included a Little Chef.
