= Watford Gap =

Area in Northamptonshire, England

Coordinates: 52.306°N 1.124°W

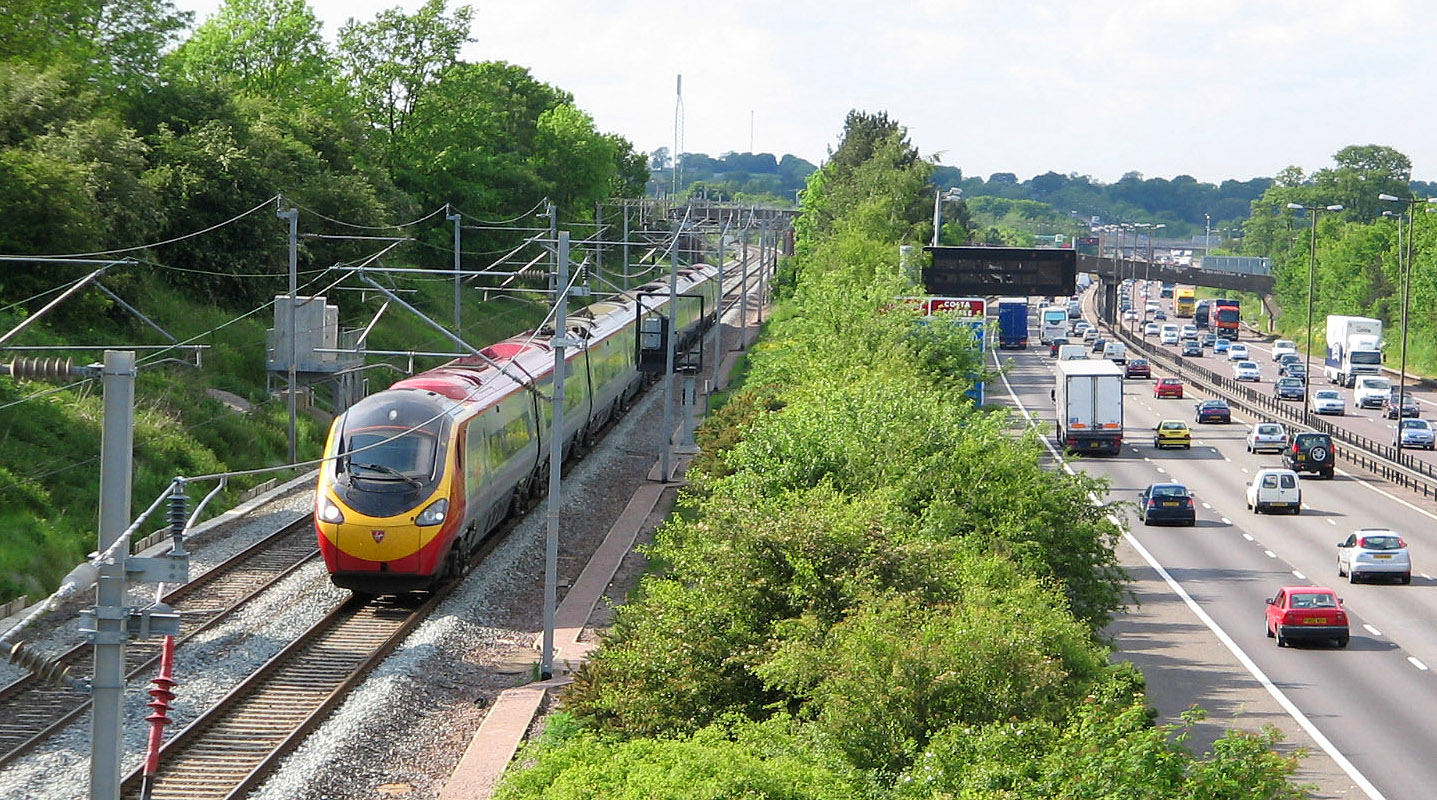
Watford Gap: West Coast Main Line and M1 motorway in parallel

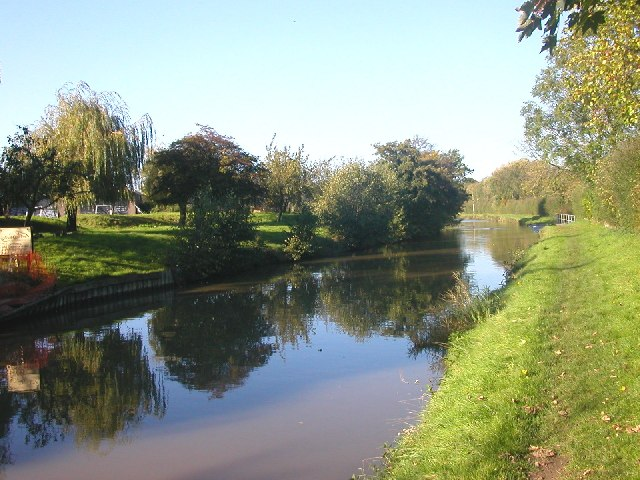
Grand Union Canal at Watford Gap.

Watford Gap is a low-lying area between two hills in the English Midlands, near Daventry and the village of Watford in Northamptonshire. Engineers from Roman times onwards have found it to be the most practical route for connecting the Midlands with South East England. The A5 road, the West Coast Main Line railway, the M1 motorway and a branch of the Grand Union Canal traverse in parallel a space about 400 metres (1,300 ft) wide. It has been written and spoken of as marking the divide between Northern England and Southern England.

== Focal point ==
Watford Gap is a low point through a range of hills providing an easy route between the South Eastern and Midland areas of England. It is near the small village of Watford, Northamptonshire. The gap is 3.5 miles (6 km) north-east of Daventry and 2 miles (3 km) west of Long Buckby. In the era of Roman Britain, the Watling Street Roman road used the gap. The road here forms the A5, which for national journeys has generally been superseded by the M1 motorway which also passes through this gap.

Later the road was joined by the Leicester Line of the Grand Union Canal, which passes through the Watford Locks just to the north of the gap.

The historical geographic importance of the area led to many modern communication routes passing through this narrow gap: the coming of the railways brought the London and Birmingham Railway, now known as the West Coast Main Line; the most recent addition, in 1959, was the M1, Britain's first inter-urban motorway, bringing with it Watford Gap services, the first motorway service station.

== Division ==
=== Geological divide ===
Topographically the gap is a pass caused by a tectonic plate shift between east and west hill ranges. A tributary of the River Nene rises at Watford and flows east to the Wash, whereas at Kilsby a tributary of the River Leam rises and flows west.

=== Sociological divide ===
==== Isogloss ====
Foot-strut split isogloss

In linguistics the Watford Gap is often regarded as where England experiences its division of north and south dialects. It is close to the north/south isogloss of the three key hallmarks of Northern English and Southern English: foot–strut split, bad–lad split and the Bath vowel.

==== North/South divide ====
Making use of the above linguistic divide, authors, journalists and social commentators have written and spoken of a north–south divide between Northern England and Southern England, referring figuratively to Watford Gap as marking the boundary between the regions.

The expression "North of Watford" is used to mean the north of England, especially a place remote from London. It is unknown whether the original expression referred to Watford, Northamptonshire, or the much larger Watford in Hertfordshire, the last urban stop on one of the main railway lines from London to the north of England. There is evidence to support the latter, as the phrase "North of Watford Junction" was used with similar meaning in the past, referring to Watford Junction railway station at Watford, Hertfordshire.

=== Stagecoach route ===
Historically, this was a junction of the West Midlands to London or East Anglia stagecoach routes across England. Its coaching inn, the Watford Gap, plied the passing trade of the area.

The pub, as well as the route from Cambridge to Coventry, is mentioned as early as 1769. This route ran through Northampton, Duston, Harlestone, past Althorp Park, Brington, Long Buckby, Watford, Watford Gap itself—the map indicating that the coaching inn was on the west side of Watling Street, and then into Kilsby. The route from Watford Gap to Kilsby is now part of the diverted A5 road following construction of the M1 motorway.

The location of the Watford Gap coaching inn is the subject of confusion, with a location on the east side of the Grand Junction Canal (within the confines of the modern service station) being the most frequently cited, near the disused Welton railway station. There is no mention of a Watford Gap pub or any other pub at the suggested location on the 1889 or 1927 or 1952 Ordnance Survey maps of Northamptonshire. The nearest pub was the now-closed Stag's Head Inn in Station Road, Watford. The original location is further north on Watling Street. The canal-side building still stands but is closed for business and in poor repair. The earlier Watford Gap Inn is in good repair and generally unaltered, with the stabling yards and main structures used as farm buildings.

== Motorway service station ==
The village is near to Watford Gap services on the M1 motorway, which was one of the first motorway service stations in the United Kingdom.

== Cultural references ==
Roy Harper's 1977 album Bullinamingvase contains a song titled "Watford Gap". Motorway service areas, which have since undergone radical innovations, were at the time in the United Kingdom typecast as spartan. The owners of Watford Gap services objected to his first reference to the place being ("Watford Gap, Watford Gap / A plate of grease and a load of crap…"). Harper was advised to drop the track from future UK copies of the album, though it reappeared on a CD reissue and remained on the American LP.

In the late 1980s "Filling the Watford Gap" was one of a number of implausible abilities attributed to the newly-launched Cadbury's Boost biscuit version by an advertising campaign, alongside "tying up a crocodile's snap" and "making policemen drop their hats".
