= Pagnell =

Pagnell may refer to:

- Boothby Pagnell, village in the South Kesteven district of Lincolnshire, England
- Hooton Pagnell, village in the metropolitan borough of Doncaster in South Yorkshire, England
- Newport Pagnell, town in the Borough of Milton Keynes, England
  - Newport Pagnell Rural District, rural district in Buckinghamshire, England, from 1894 to 1974
  - Newport Pagnell services, motorway service station between junctions 14 and 15 of the M1 motorway
  - Newport Pagnell Town F.C., football club based at Newport Pagnell, near Milton Keynes
