= Toddington =

Toddington could be

- Toddington, Bedfordshire
  - Toddington services, M1 motorway
- Toddington, Gloucestershire
  - Toddington railway station
- Toddington, West Sussex
