= Great Gonerby =

Village and civil parish in Lincolnshire, England

Coordinates: 52.934538°N 0.666668°W

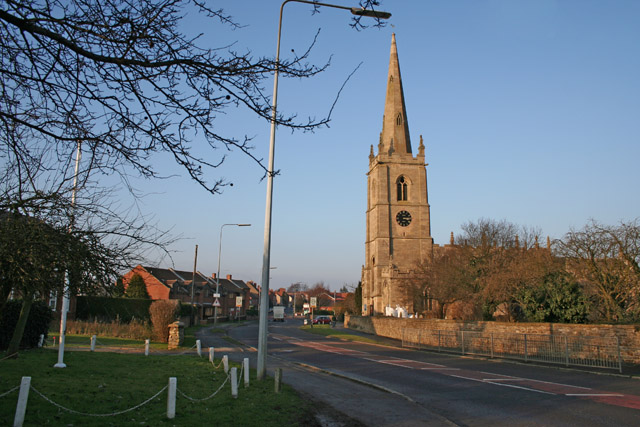
- High Street, Great Gonerby

- Location within Lincolnshire
- Population: 2,200 (2011)
- OS grid reference: SK897382
  - London: 100 mi (160 km) S
- District: South Kesteven
- Shire county: Lincolnshire
- Region: East Midlands
- Country: England
- Sovereign state: United Kingdom
- Post town: Grantham
- Postcode district: NG31
- Police: Lincolnshire
- Fire: Lincolnshire
- Ambulance: East Midlands
- UK Parliament: Grantham and Bourne

Great Gonerby is a village and civil parish in the South Kesteven district of Lincolnshire, England. The population of the civil parish at the 2011 census was 2,200. It is situated less than 1 mile (1.6 km) north from Grantham. To its north is Gonerby Moor, part of Great Gonerby civil parish, and the A1 road. It is 330 feet (101 m) above sea level and overlooks the Vale of Belvoir to the west and Grantham to the south.

== Geography ==
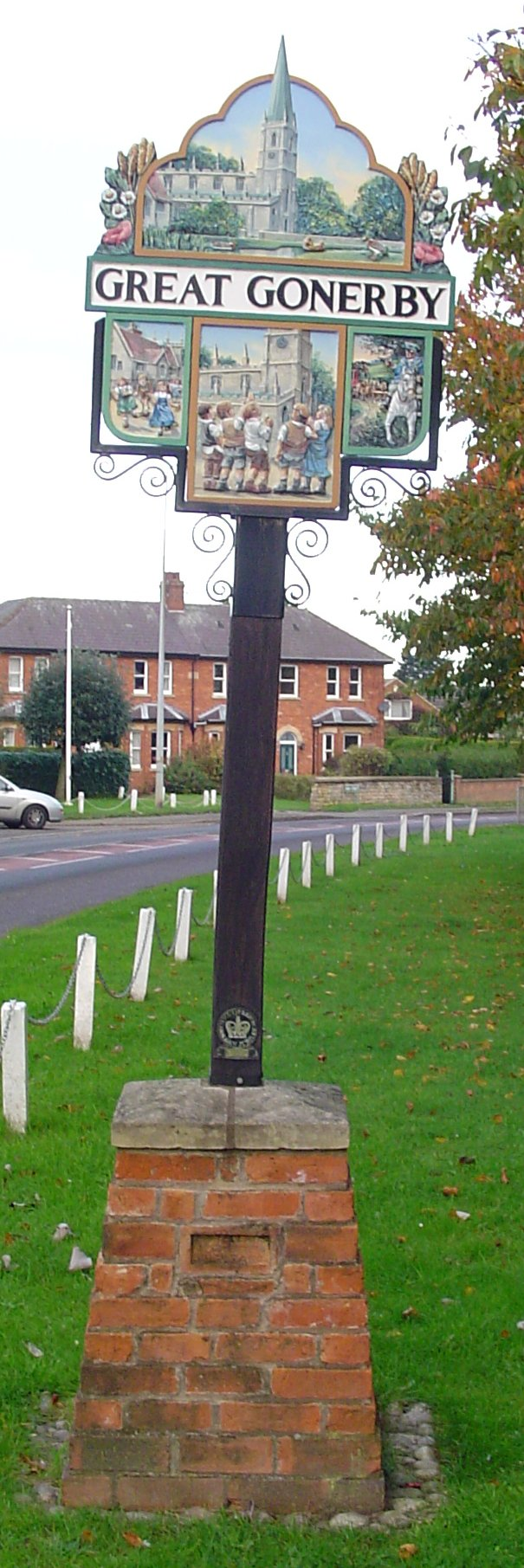
Village sign in Great Gonerby

The urban sprawl from Grantham in the 1990s has meant that the village is separated from the town by approximately 400 yards (366 m).

Great Gonerby, with about 825 houses, has a social club, village shop, post office, and the Recruiting Sergeant public house. Harry's Place, with seating for 10, is significant for being the smallest Michelin-starred restaurant.

== History ==
The large parish church is dedicated to St Sebastian. It is part of the Barrowby and Great Gonerby Group of the Deanery of Grantham. The 2013 incumbent was Rev Peter Hopkins who retired in 2019. The Church currently runs without fixed ordained presence.

A house called Cromwell's Cottage takes its name from the tradition that Oliver Cromwell based his troops here before attacking Grantham.

The local inhabitants are known as 'Clockpelters', from the habit of trying to strike the face of the church clock with stones or snowballs. The clock dates from 1897.

== Economy ==
At the Triangle industrial estate, the NAAFI had a £4m depot run by Watson & Philip Foodservice, of Dundee, from December 1994. It served the north of England, with around 200 staff. Watson & Philip ran the Alldays (supermarket). The NAAFI was headquartered in Amesbury in Wiltshire. The site was officially opened on Wednesday May 22 1996 by Air Marshal Sir Peter Squire. From October 1997 it became Puritan Maid, owned by Brake Bros.

== Transport ==
The village gives its name to the Gonerby Moor services, which opened in January 1964.
