= M69 motorway =

Motorway in Leicestershire and Warwickshire, England

M69

- M69 highlighted in blue Shown with UK motorway network

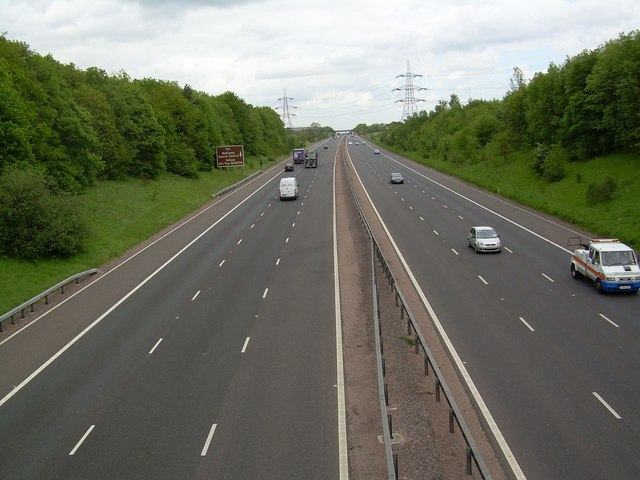
- Looking east towards Leicester, 2009

Route information
- Maintained by National Highways
- Length: 15.7 mi (25.3 km)
- Existed: 1976–present
- History: Constructed 1976–77

Major junctions
- North-east end: Leicester
- M6 motorway / M1 motorway
- South-west end: Coventry

Location
- Country: United Kingdom
- Primary destinations: Nuneaton, Hinckley

Road network
- Roads in the United Kingdom; Motorways; A and B road zones
← M67	→ M73

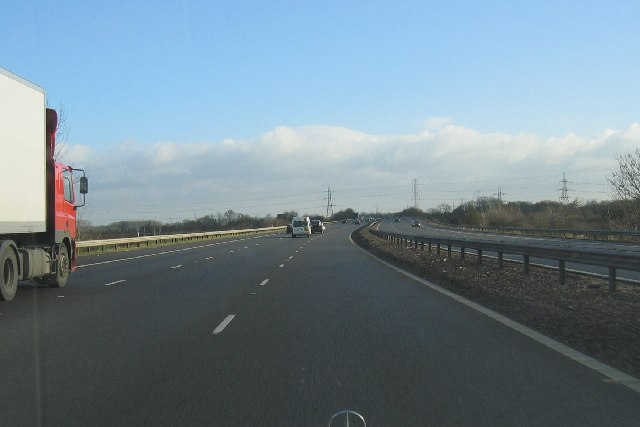
Heading east along the road

The M69 is a 15.7-mile-long (25 km) dual three-lane dual carriageway motorway in Leicestershire and Warwickshire, England. It runs between junction 21 of the M1 near Leicester and junction 2 of the M6 near Coventry. It opened in 1977.

== History ==
The motorway, also known at the time as the 'Coventry – Leicester Motorway' was completed in 1977 following a public inquiry in 1972. It took traffic from the A46, which was subsequently downgraded.

In May 1970 in the last month of the Labour government, the Transport secretary decided to go ahead with the M69. The first route was given on 19 November 1971. In 1972 it was expected to open in 1974. The public enquiry was on 3 October 1972 at Hinckley Council Offices. A spur was planned for Braunstone, part of the Leicester Orbital Road.

In April 1973 the route fixed, to start in early 1974, to be finished by late 1975. In March 1974 construction was deferred. In July 1974, construction would start in early 1975.

=== Construction ===
The contract for 8 miles (13 km) from Burbage to Enderby was given in January 1975 to Alfred McAlpine. The 9-mile (14 km) section from the A5 to the M1 opened on 21 December 1976. It was to open the day before, but snow had stopped white lines being laid.

In April 1975 a £12.5 million contract was given to Dowsett Engineering for the Anstey section. It was fully opened on 12 July 1977 by John Horam at the Wolvey Road bridge in Bulkington, in Warwickshire.

== Route ==
Starting at the north-eastern suburbs of Coventry at junction 2 of the M6, the motorway crosses the Coventry Canal and then continues north-east past Bulkington and west of Wolvey before turning more easterly to run south of Hinckley. It then crosses the Birmingham to Peterborough railway line terminating in the vicinity of suburban Enderby and Braunstone to the south-west of Leicester junction 3, where it meets the M1 with continuation along the A5460/A563 towards Leicester.

The M69 has no motorway service area given that this function is fulfilled at present by Leicester Forest East services and Corley services in close proximity to the start and end points of this relatively short motorway.

== Proposed developments ==
There is an aspiration to construct a new slip road and road bridge for traffic travelling southbound on the M1 to join the M69.

Plans for a service station were announced in November 2023, to be located at junction 1 at the Stretton Baskerville roundabout. Welcome Break's application will be the first service station for the route. The route has been without services for over 50 years and currently has a 26-mile (42 km) unserviced stretch, which exceeds the government's maximum recommendation of 14 miles (23 km) between heavy goods vehicle stations.

== Junctions ==
M69 motorway junctions
County	Location	mi	km	Junction	Destinations	Notes
Warwickshire	Coventry	0	0	M6 J2 (Note: 52.4372°N 1.4232°W)	M6 – Birmingham, Manchester A4600 – Coventry; A46 – Coventry	road continues south as A46
Warwickshire	—	6.2	10.0	1 (Note: 52.5150°N 1.3613°W)	A5 – Tamworth, Rugby; B4109 – Hinckley	
Leicestershire	—	8.9	14.3	2 (Note: 52.5402°N 1.3168°W)	B4669 – Hinckley, Sapcote	No Northbound entrance or Southbound exit
Leicestershire	Leicester	15.7	25.3	M1 J21 (Note: 52.6005°N 1.1951°W)	M1 – Nottingham, Northampton, London A5460 – Leicester	
1.000 mi = 1.609 km; 1.000 km = 0.621 mi: Concurrency terminus; Incomplete access

Coordinate list

== See also ==
- List of motorways in the United Kingdom
