= A5120 road =

Road in England

A5120

Route information
- Length: 4.7 mi (7.6 km)

Major junctions
- North end: Ampthill; 52.0166°N 0.5013°W
- A507; M1
- South end: Toddington; 51.5723°N 0.3104°W

Location
- Country: United Kingdom
- Constituent country: England
- Primary destinations: Flitwick, Toddington

Road network
- Roads in the United Kingdom; Motorways; A and B road zones

The A5120 is an A-class road in Bedfordshire, linking the towns of Ampthill and Flitwick to the M1 motorway at Toddington. It connects with the M1 at junction 12 near the Toddington services. On its route from Ampthill to Toddington, the A5120 serves Westoning and Harlington. Unusually for an A-road, it does not meet another A-road at any point between its start on the A507 and its end at the M1 J12.

The route previously ran to the old A5 Watling Street at Dunstable (now the A5183), however upon the opening of the A5 Dunstable Northern Bypass, the section between the M1 and the new junction A5 was downgraded to the B5120, about halving the length of the route.

In 2009, the annual average daily traffic flow on the A5120 near Westoning was slightly over 17,000.
