= Murcott, Northamptonshire =

Hamlet in England

Coordinates: 52.3049°N 1.0936°W

Murcott
- Location within Northamptonshire
- OS grid reference: SP618678
- Unitary authority: West Northamptonshire
- Ceremonial county: Northamptonshire
- Region: East Midlands
- Country: England
- Sovereign state: United Kingdom
- Post town: Northampton
- Postcode district: NN6
- Dialling code: 01327
- Police: Northamptonshire
- Fire: Northamptonshire
- Ambulance: East Midlands
- UK Parliament: Daventry

Murcott is a hamlet in Watford civil parish, in Northamptonshire, approximately half a mile west of the village of Long Buckby.
