= Northampton services =

English motorway service station

Northampton Services
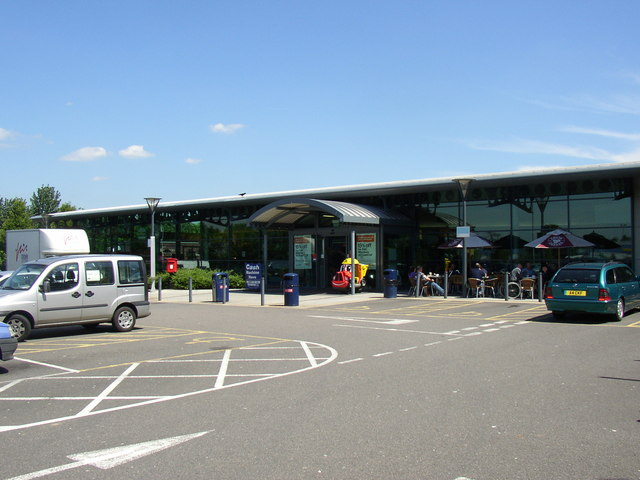
- The southbound services building.

- Location in Northamptonshire, England Location on the UK motorway network

Information
- County: Northamptonshire
- Road: M1
- Coordinates: 52.2092°N 0.9448°W
- Operator: Roadchef
- Previous operator: Blue Boar
- Previous name: Rothersthorpe Services
- Date opened: May 1978 (petrol) July 16 1979 (food) August 15 2002 (new site)
- Website: www.roadchef.com/locations/northampton

Northampton services is a motorway service station off the M1 motorway and A43 interchange near Northampton, England. It is owned by Roadchef, and used to be called Rothersthorpe.

== History ==
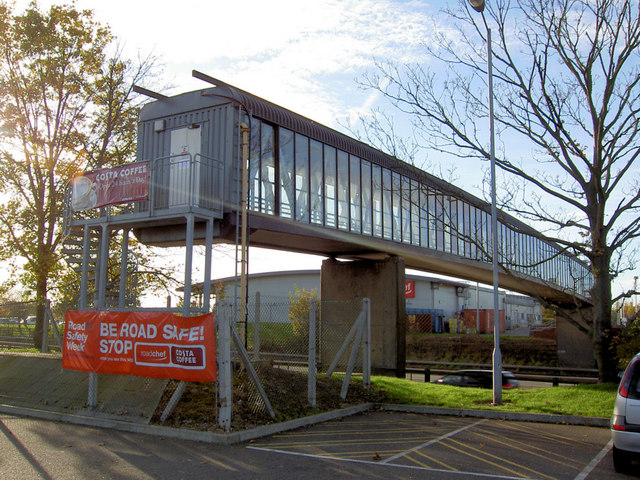
The now unused footbridge over the motorway

In February 1971, Blue Boar, of Albert Street in Rugby decided to apply to run the site. There would be a transport cafe on the southbound side, with a footbridge to both sides. It would have to cost at least £150,000.

The Blue Boar company had started in 1939 as the Blue Boar filling station on London Road (A45) in Dunchurch, started by Lyndon Smith, with his wife Dorothy, who had moved to Coventry in 1928 from Cumbria. He died aged 69 in early August 1981 at his home on Bilton Road in Rugby.

Planning permission was given in November 1971, for ten acres, and catering for 212 customers. In 1974, the managing director of Blue Boar was John Lampitt.

=== Construction ===
Construction was planned to start on 1 January 1973, being built by Kottler and Heron, part of Bacal Construction, costing £257,000.

By October 1973 it was to start construction that month, to cost £700,000. But costs vastly increased. The 1973 oil crisis caused a large downturn in national fuel sales, making a service area distinctly less economic to run profitably, which held up construction for at least two years. By May 1978, it would cost around £2m. Construction on the cafeteria had not begun, but the petrol station on both sides would open around May 1978.

In March 1986, Blue Boar wanted to build a 90-seat restaurant on the northbound side.

=== Redevelopment in 2002 ===
In 1999 it had parking for only 60 cars, 6 coaches and 15 trucks. Roadchef wanted to increase this to 223 cars, 11 coaches and 37 trucks. In August 2000 Roadchef wanted to extend the site, to add a McDonald's and Costa Coffee. It received council permission in September 2001.

The new £9m improvement opened on 15 August 2002. It became the Northampton service area in early 2003.

== Opening ==
There would be a restaurant and transport cafe on the southbound side only. Catering facilities would open on 16 July 1979. The first site manager was 43-year-old Chris Dunkley, of Lawford Road in Rugby, with a staff of 24.

When first opened, Rothersthorpe Services (as it was then known) was located between junctions, an 'online' service area. However, in 1991 the Blisworth Bypass on the A43 was opened, this linked into the M1 at the Rothersthorpe site, creating a junction surrounding the site.

In May 1998 Nikko Europe bought Roadchef, then in July 1998 it bought Blue Boar, and combined the two.

== Incidents ==
Blue Boar had banned all football supporters, but this was cautiously lifted in September 1980.

In May 1982, a stag party, on a coach, from Luton caused £300 of damage, and were kept at Northampton police station for 15 hours, after a cake fight in the early hours.

== Footbridge ==
The 21 year old concrete footbridge was closed in February 1980, for structural surveys, with another put next to it. The original concrete bridge was demolished on 9 February 1980.

The footbridge was taken out of use for the public in 2002 when the site was redeveloped, though it still remains in place.

== Location ==
Northampton services are located at junction 15A of the M1 at a junction with the A43, because of the way the service area has evolved, it is possible to reach and exit the services without negotiating the main junction, but uniquely it is also possible to access the service area on the opposite carriageway legally.

The services are about 4 miles (6.4 km) south of Northampton town centre and 65 miles (105 km) north west of London.

Next southbound: Newport Pagnell	Motorway service stations on the M1 motorway	Next northbound: Watford Gap
