= Donington Park motorway services =

Motorway service station in the English East Midlands

Donington Park Services
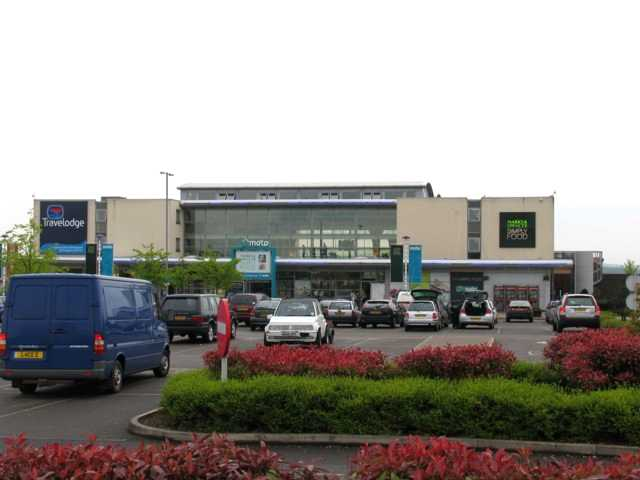
- North end of the main building

- Location in Leicestershire, England Location on the UK motorway network

Information
- County: Leicestershire
- Road: M1
- Coordinates: 52.8218°N 1.3081°W
- Operator: Moto Hospitality
- Previous operator: Granada
- Date opened: 8 July 1999
- Fuel: BP
- Website: moto-way.com/services/donington-park/

Donington Park is a motorway service station owned by Moto, near Kegworth village in the English East Midlands.

== Geography ==
It is accessed from the M1 motorway by junctions 23a (from the south) and 24 (from the north), and is part of the complex of junctions involving the A42, A453, A50 and A6 roads.

From a local government perspective, the service station is in the civil parish of Long Whatton and Diseworth, the district of North West Leicestershire and the county of Leicestershire.

The service station is adjacent to East Midlands Airport and the East Midlands Gateway freight terminal, and is some 3 miles (4.8 km) from the Donington Park motorsport circuit, from which it takes its name.

== Structure ==
The service area comprises a main building, with car parking to the north, a separate refuelling station to the east and a conservation area and lake to the south. The main building has a central three-story high atrium containing a food court, with flanking three-story wings to west and east containing retail outlets and other facilities on the ground floor, and the rooms of a Travelodge hotel in the upper floors. The main entrance to the building is from the car park to the north, whilst at the south end is an outdoor terrace overlooking the lake.

== History ==
It cost £25m. 70,000 trees were planted on the 48-acre site. The Travelodge had 83 bedrooms. There were 479 car parking spaces. It was built by John Mowlem. Mowlem had also built the £9.5m northbound M6 Stafford services in 1996, also for Granada.

Donington Park motorway services opened on 8 July 1999, being originally owned by Granada, which became Moto in 2001.

At the opening, Charlie Dimmock planted 20 trees at the opening. A 1955 Maserati 250F racing car was displayed at the opening, with owner Tom Wheatcroft.

It was one of the first to offer a whole set of non-food shops, similar to an airport, which now has been adopted as standard. The neighbouring airport has far fewer landside facilities for those awaiting arrivals (before check-in).

== Gallery ==
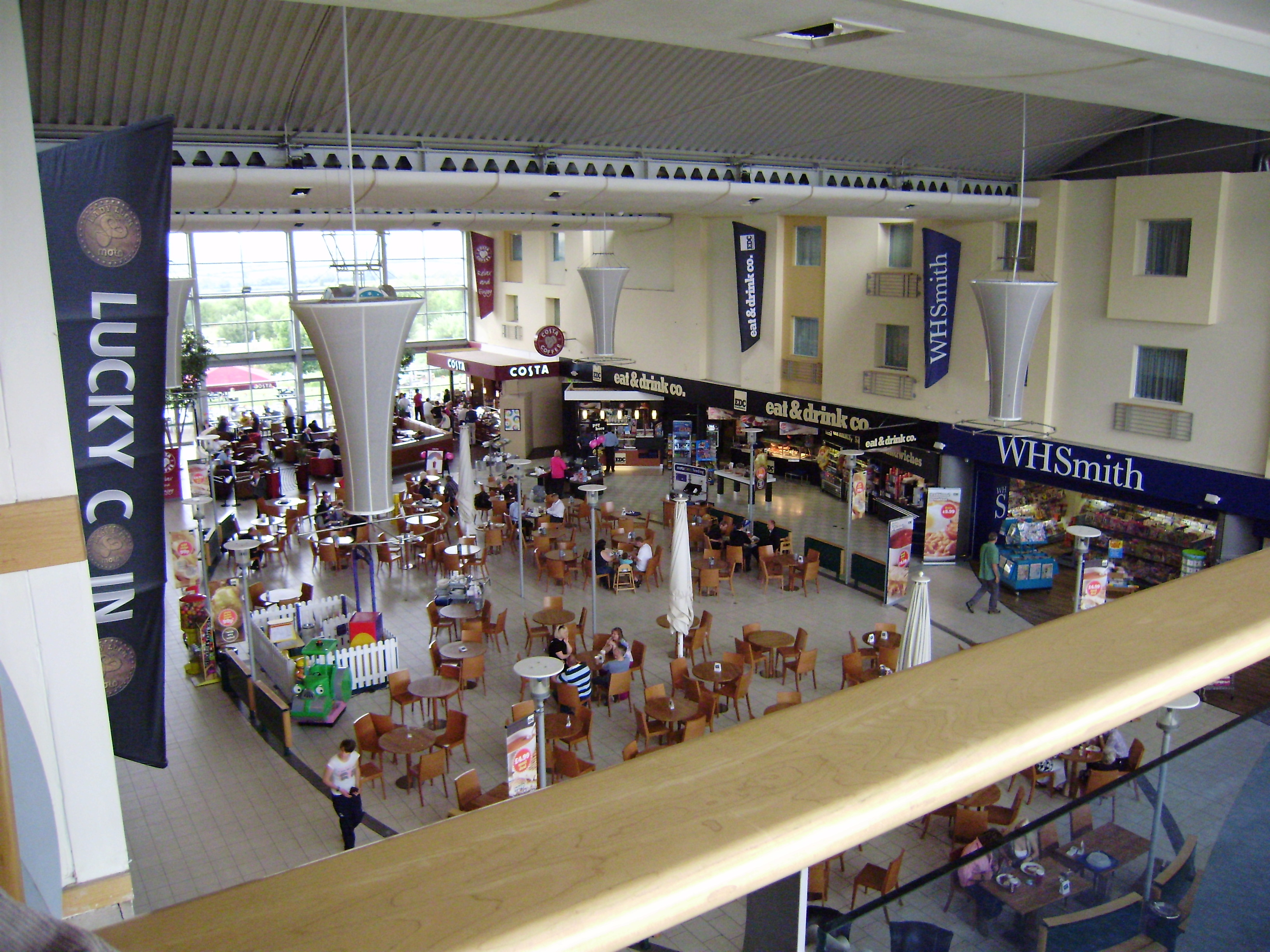
Interior of main building viewed from upper floor

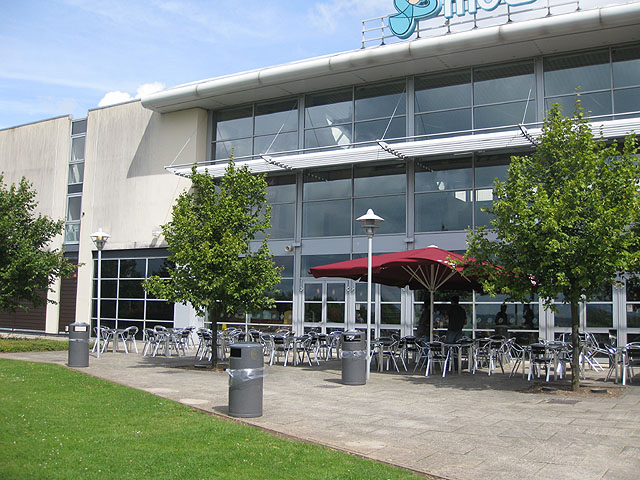
South end of main building, with terrace overlooking lake

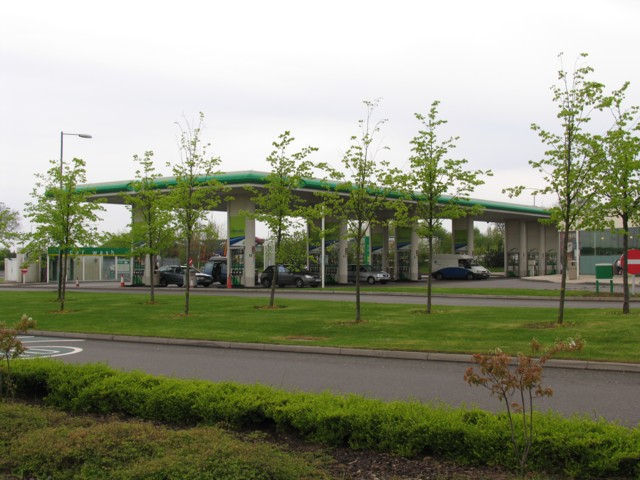
Refuelling area to east of main building

Next southbound: Leicester Forest East	Motorway service stations on the M1 motorway	Next northbound: Trowell
