= Trowell services =

Motorway service area in Nottinghamshire, England

Trowell Services
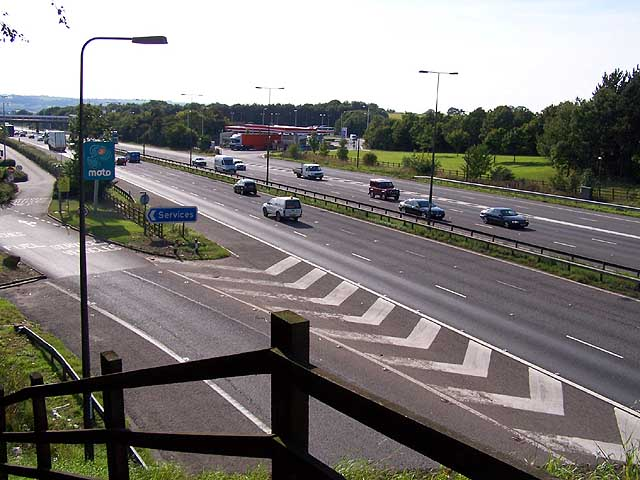
- M1 heading southbound

- Location in Nottinghamshire, England Location on the UK motorway network

Information
- County: Nottinghamshire
- Road: M1
- Coordinates: 52.9632°N 1.2660°W
- Operator: Moto Hospitality
- Date opened: 23 March 1967
- Website: moto-way.com/services/trowell-northbound/

Trowell services is a motorway service station off the M1 motorway in Trowell, Nottinghamshire, England, situated north of Junction 25. Opened in 1967 by Mecca Leisure, it is currently owned by Moto. The services are situated near Nottingham.

== History ==
In August 1963 it was to cost £350,000, sited on the north part of Trowell Moor, to be built by January 1966.

=== Construction ===
The service area was going to be slightly further south, nearer to the A609, with planning permission given in April 1962. It was built by John Laing. Laing also built Keele around the same time; Laing had also built five teaching blocks and eight halls of residence at the University of Nottingham. It was known as the Mecca Village. The site was planned to open in summer 1966, with the contract awarded on in January 1964, and construction was to start in 1965.

It opened on Thursday 23 March 1967, with a special area for dogs, developed with the RSPCA. At the opening were around 300 people, with many chairmen of local rural district councils, and the Sheriff of Nottingham, Elliot Durham, and Alan Fairley, joint chairman of Mecca Ltd.

It had 24 acres (9.7 ha), and employed 300, being opened seven months after the M1 motorway section; this section of motorway took two years to be built, and cost £4.75 million; the motorway section was built from junction 25 to Stanton by Dale by George Wimpey, and the next part to junction 26 was built by Robert M Douglas; the section was opened on Thursday 25 August 1966. The motorway section was meant to open in January 1966, part of the Lockington-Nuthall section.

=== Decoration ===
George Dereford, a Hungarian artist from Marlow, Buckinghamshire, made two three-dimensional mosaic murals about Robin Hood, in an Aztec style, near the entrances, being seven foot high called The Fighting Horsemen and The Archer. The Robin Hood Way currently follows half of the service road, to the east.

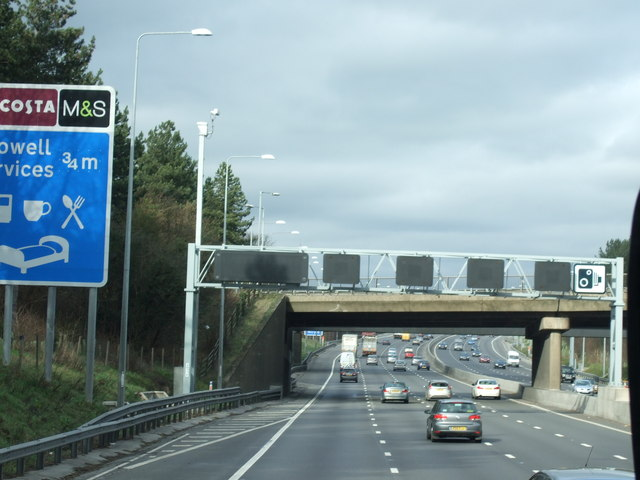
Northbound entrance in March 2012

The interior was constructed to appear as a medieval banqueting hall, with a large Major Oak in the middle. The menu was on a piece of mock-parchment. The entrance foyer had two jousting horsemen. The buildings were designed by Kett & Neve.

=== Food ===
There were six catering units; the site could cater for up to 750 in 1966:

- Sheriff's Restaurant, 190 seats, open from 7.30 am until 2 am, waitress service
- North Forest Cafe, seated 150, open from 7 am until 11 pm, self-service
- South Forest Cafe, as the North cafe
- Truckers had the North Transport Club, 60 seats, from 7 am to 11 pm and a South Transport Club, but only open from Monday to Friday for both

Manageresses completed two-year catering and hotel management courses at Clarendon College of Further Education.

It was bought by Granada in October 1977, which gave Granada 10 service areas. The site had 188 staff, and was improved by May 1978. The northbound self-service restaurant was totally rebuilt over the winter of 1977, with 250 seats. The coffee shop had waitress service, with grills and cooked-to-order dishes. The southbound transport cafe was improved, and a retail shop opened. The self-service restaurant was open 24 hours, with the coffee shops and retail shop open from 7am to 10pm. Later in 1978 the forecourt would become self service, and a new transport cafe would be built on the northbound side.

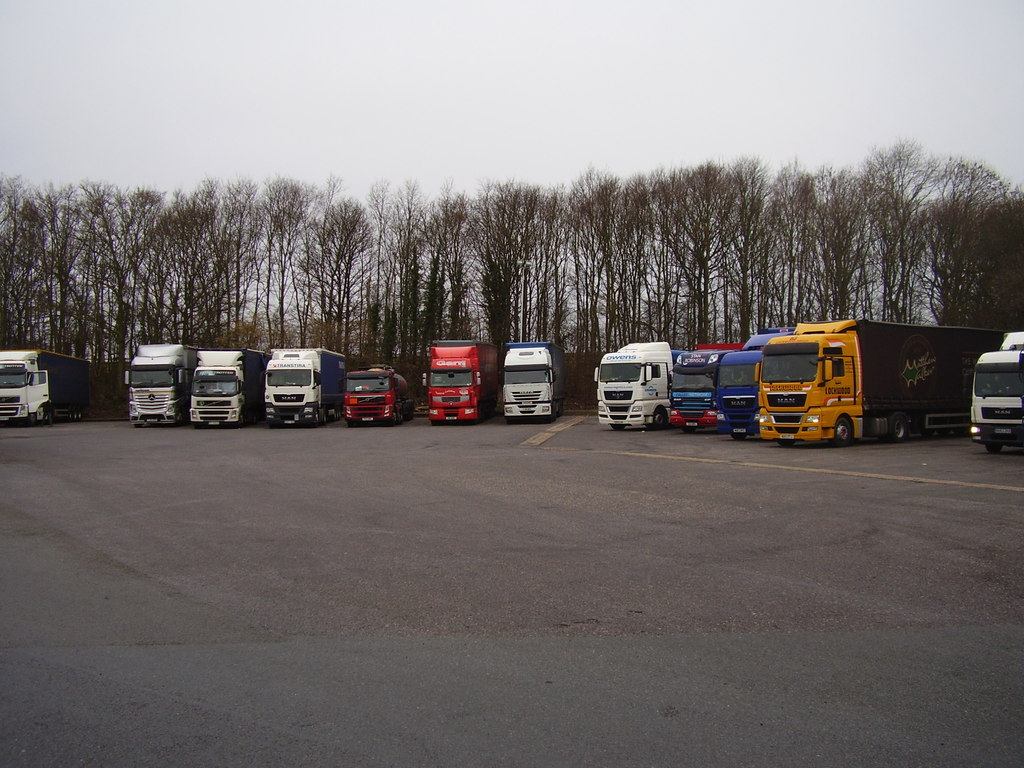
Truckers in February 2014

=== Buildings ===
It had 60 petrol pumps, a post office, a RAC station, a police station, with Robin Hood shields in the entrance. There was a business conference building for up to 250 people. The car parks were for 400 vehicles. It was managed from Trowell Hall.

=== Renovation ===
On 7 April 1988 health minister Edwina Currie opened the new Country Kitchen, costing £750,000, built over 10 weeks by Simons of Lincoln. At the opening, Edwina Currie said that British Rail coffee was too expensive.

In April 1989 the Granada services were refurbished. A 'Business Point' centre opened on 4 April 1989.

Nottinghamshire County Council opened a Tourist Information Centre, on the northbound side, on 31 March 1991. An English Tourist Network Automation (ETNA) computer was installed in April 1992.

== Incidents ==
- In December 1980 at the services, 59 year old Cyril Pymer drove a Cortina 20 miles south along the M1 in the wrong carriageway, colliding head-on with a Rolls-Royce, killing three people
- On 11 September 1989 at 7.30am, a £140,000 Ferrari 308 GTB/GTS caught fire entering the northbound slip road and completely burned in the service area. There was smoke for a half-mile. It was owned by Read Performance Cars, from Birmingham. Fire engines attended from Long Eaton, Stapleford and Stockhill.
- Early on Saturday 23 May 1992 four males in a E-registration red-coloured BMW attempted to kidnap a woman. Three males from Mansfield intervened, and one who was then kidnapped himself at knifepoint, and dumped on the slip road at junction 26, 25-year-old Paul Coupe, a tyre fitter from Mansfield. Detective Sergeant Steve Baumber, of Beeston police station, led the enquiry

== Operation ==
In November 1984, there were 120 staff, with a Burger Express. The southbound restaurant was closed in winter. Tea was 40p, coffee was 40p, breakfast was £2.35, beefburgers were £2.10, fish and chips was £1.85, and soup was 60p.

In July 1999, an English breakfast was £4.99, and fish and chips was £5.99. A pot of Tetley tea was £1.49, and a cup of coffee was £1.79.

== See also ==
- Barbara Mayo, from London, seen hitchhiking at the service area on 12 October 1970

| Next southbound: Donington Park | Motorway service stations on the M1 motorway | Next northbound: Tibshelf |
