= Leicester Forest East services =

Services on the M1 motorway, UK

Leicester Forest East Services
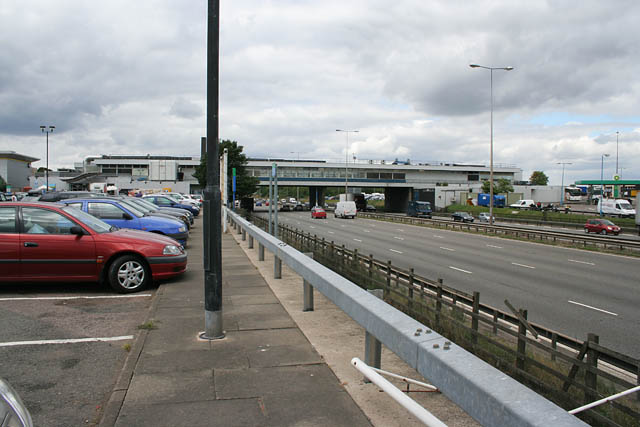
- The services straddle the motorway.

- Location in Leicestershire, England Location on the UK motorway network

Information
- County: Leicestershire
- Road: M1
- Coordinates: 52.6192°N 1.206°W
- Operator: Welcome Break
- Date opened: 15 February 1966 (6 May 1966 official opening)
- Website: welcomebreak.co.uk/locations/leicester-forest-east/

Leicester Forest East services is a motorway service station situated between junctions 21 and 21A of the M1 motorway, near Leicester, England.

== History ==
It was designed for the opening of the second phase of the M1 in 1966 (seven years after the first phase was completed), based on an Italian design used on the Autostrade. This design is very rare in Britain.

=== Construction ===
The contract was awarded to Ross in January 1963, to cost £500,000 and to open in November 1964.

Work was to start in November 1963. The contract was awarded on Friday 21 August 1964 to R.M. Douglas Construction Ltd of Erdington. The architect was Howard V Lobb.

=== Opening of the motorway ===
At 2.30 pm on Friday 22 January 1965, the £12 million M1 section, from Misterton with Walcote to Markfield, was opened at the service area, being constructed. The person who led the 'Save Charnwood' campaign, (Arthur) Robert Bown, a Leicester hosiery manufacturer, Sports Hosiery, of Newtown Linford was invited to the opening, along with the Bishop of Leicester, and Leicestershire MPs Woodrow Wyatt and John Farr. The 'Save Charnwood' campaign had 33,000 signatures.

The new motorway route had been published on Wednesday 17 September 1958. Leicestershire County Council had nonetheless supported the earlier deeply-controversial route, through Charnwood Forest.

=== Opening of the site ===
It opened on February 15 1966, with a transport cafe, a self service cafeteria, and 72 fuel pumps. It had cost £600,000.

It was officially opened on Friday 6 May 1966 by Sir Cyril Osborne, the MP for Louth.

=== Food ===
The services features a bridge-restaurant, between the two bases crossing the motorway, containing all of the service station's restaurants. At the time of opening it was operated by the Ross Group and featured a Terence Conran designed restaurant with a waitress silver service restaurant.

Ross Group had carried out research in the US, Canada and in Europe. The whole site seated 800 people.

- The Captain's Table Restaurant
- Two transport cafes, seating 105

Professional musician Henry Poultney of Leicester was the pianist, for a year, in the Captain's Table restaurant from July 1967 to July 1968. Henry Poultney, of 275 Scraptoft Lane, died aged 66 in December 1979. The Captain's Table served a Christmas day lunch, on an inclusive price, which had to be booked on telephone Kirby Muxloe 2541, continuing into the early 1970s. The restaurant had a high standard of cleanliness, and served many 'foreign dishes'. It had a Sicilian marble entrance lobby, with exotic palm trees, and tropical plants, all decorated in a nautical theme, due to the wishes of the Grimsby owner.

The catering dept had an Outside Catering unit that arranged the catering for large events such as birthdays. Another Ross Motorgrill opened on the A5 at Hinckley in 1967.

Ross Services Ltd, a sister company, also opened the Selby Fork Motor Hotel in March 1968 at Ledsham, West Yorkshire, which cost £500,000. This site had a swimming pool, tennis courts, and the Chef de Cuisine, William True, who had worked at the Imperial Hotel Torquay for many years, which is now part of The Hotel Collection. In 1968, most motorway service areas did not provide accommodation. The Selby Fork Motor Hotel served food in 'The Commodore Room', which had music and was open until 2am. Ross named restaurants with maritime themes; the reception was the Admiral's Cabin. Single rooms were 74 shillings and double rooms were 110 shillings. The site at Ledsham had four suites named after historical figures.

=== Buildings ===
It would have parking for 200 vehicles.

=== Welcome Break ===
The site became operated under the Motoross group, until 1983, becoming Welcome Break in early 1984. Motoross, with five service areas, was headquartered at the site, and during the first years of Welcome Break. Welcome Break was bought by THF on 21 July 1986 for £190 million, who changed their service stations' name to Welcome Break in June 1988.

The Welcome Break headquarters subsequently moved to Newport Pagnell, under THF. The motorway division of Trust Houses Forte Catering had always been headquartered at Newport Pagnell since 1959.

== Incidents ==
=== 1975 private aeroplane incident ===
On Sunday 27 April 1975, at 7.15pm, a light aircraft piloted by 30 year old Timothy John Castledine landed in the middle lane of the northbound carriageway of the M1, with a Jodel DR1050 Ambassadeur aircraft 'G-AXUE', manufactured in France. He taxied the 100 yards up the slip road, into the service area. Also in the aircraft was Geoffrey Cocker, a flying instructor from Worksop, with his daughter Jennifer, and Lorna Brady of Killamarsh. He was flying to Netherthorpe Airfield in north Nottinghamshire.

Staff at the service area saw the aircraft land on the motorway, and said that 'it was quite a good landing'. Three police cars, of Leicestershire Police had been dispatched to the service area, and met the pilot as he taxied in.

The pilot later wanted to take off from the motorway, which would mean blocking off the motorway for five minutes, but the Department of Environment totally refused this. At 3pm on Tuesday April 29 1975 the plane took off from a nearby field. Ross Services allowed part of the fence to be dismantled. The pilot, a foundry metallurgist, was educated at Swanwick Hall Grammar School, and his father Stan Castledine was deputy managing director of Butterley Engineering. He sailed at Sutton-in-Ashfield sailing club. He appeared at Leicester magistrates on Wednesday March 17 1976, where Gail Chippington from the CAA claimed that his preparations for flying were not sufficient. For this he was fined £150 with £121 costs. He had not acquired a sufficient weather forecast, and an air traffic controller at East Midlands Airport had requested that he first attempt to land at Leicester Airport, and not anywhere else.

On Sunday June 11 1989 the aircraft later crashed into a tree at Bagby Airfield, when caught by a gust of wind.

== Proposed closure ==
Leicester Forest East services faced permanent closure in 2017 if the M1/M69 junction had been developed to increase capacity to accommodate predicted traffic growth.

Next southbound: Watford Gap	Motorway service stations on the M1 motorway	Next northbound: Donington Park
