= London Gateway services =

Motorway service area in London, England

London Gateway Services
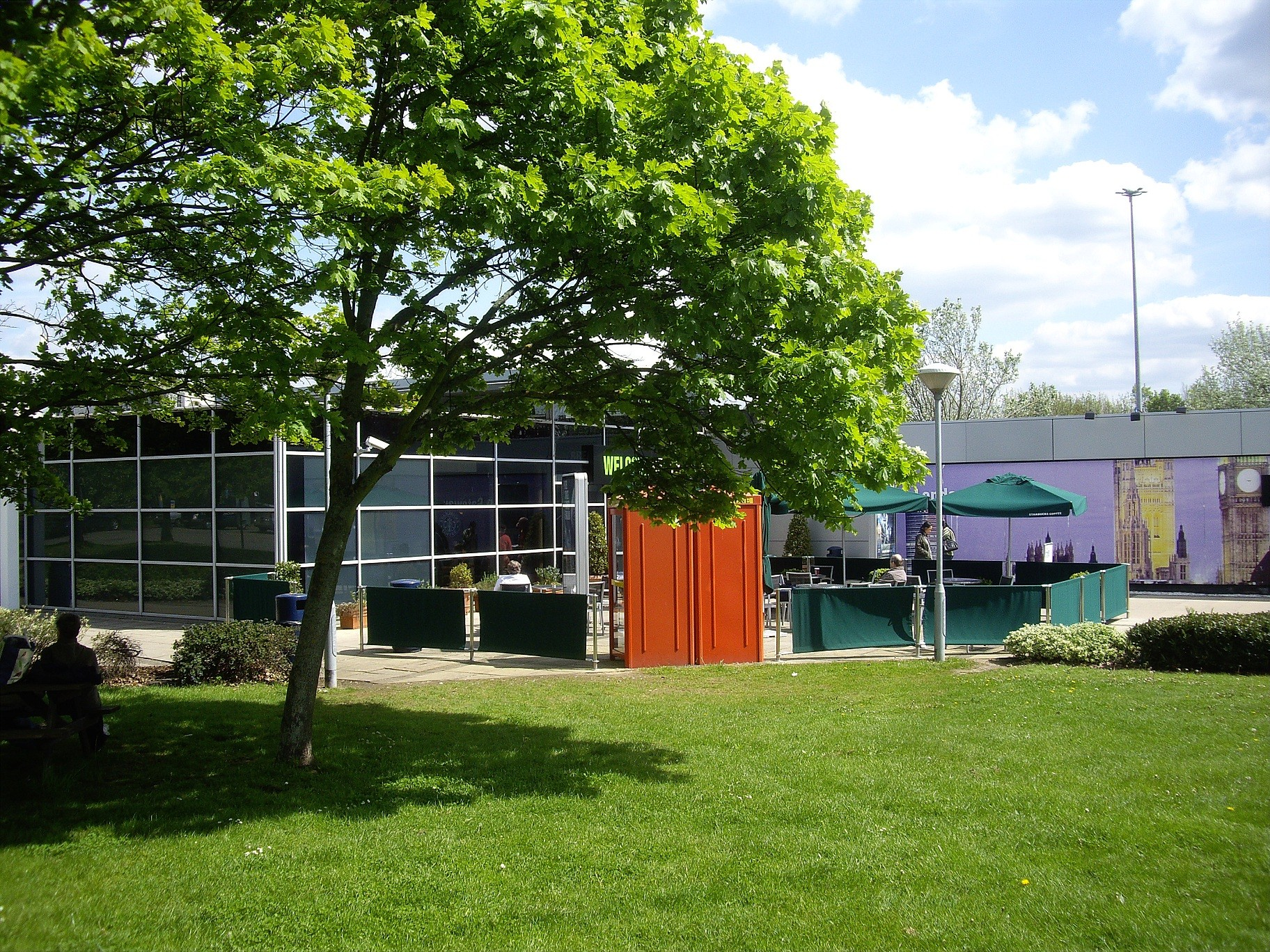
- The main building

- Location in Greater London, England Location in Barnet, London Location on the UK motorway network

Information
- County: Greater London
- Road: M1
- Coordinates: 51.631°N 0.264°W
- Operator: Welcome Break
- Previous name: Scratchwood Services
- Date opened: 1969
- Website: welcomebreak.co.uk/locations/london-gateway/

London Gateway services is the southernmost motorway service station on the M1 motorway – between Junctions 2 and 4 – north of London, England. It is between Arkley and Edgware on the west side of the road, has a hotel, and, unusually, has an early give way on its northern approach. In addition, the museum ship HMS Belfast uses the station as the target of her forward guns.

== History ==
It opened in 1969, run by Forte, and was opened as Scratchwood Services.

The guns in both forward turrets on the museum ship HMS Belfast, moored between Tower Bridge and London Bridge some 11.7 miles away in the centre of London, are elevated and trained on the London Gateway Motorway Services Area to illustrate the range of the ship's armament.

A reserved section of the current service area is a major long-distance coach service interchange.

=== Construction ===
Its main approaches are those built for an abortive junction 3 of the M1 for a spur (as at junction 2) to link to the A1.

Planning permission for a Tesla Supercharger, consisting of 32 stalls to be built at the site, was granted on 18 May 2018, but the stalls are yet to open.

=== Incidents ===
On Friday 19 November 1993 HM Customs and Excise stopped a vehicle at the service area, and found Britain's largest seizure of heroin, worth £30m, under Operation Zarzuela. It had been driven from Turkey, and had 200 kg of heroin, via the 'Balkan Route'.

On 6 September 1997, many people parked at the service station to witness the passing of the funeral hearse of Diana, Princess of Wales on its way along with the M1 from central London to her burial place in Althorp, Northamptonshire.

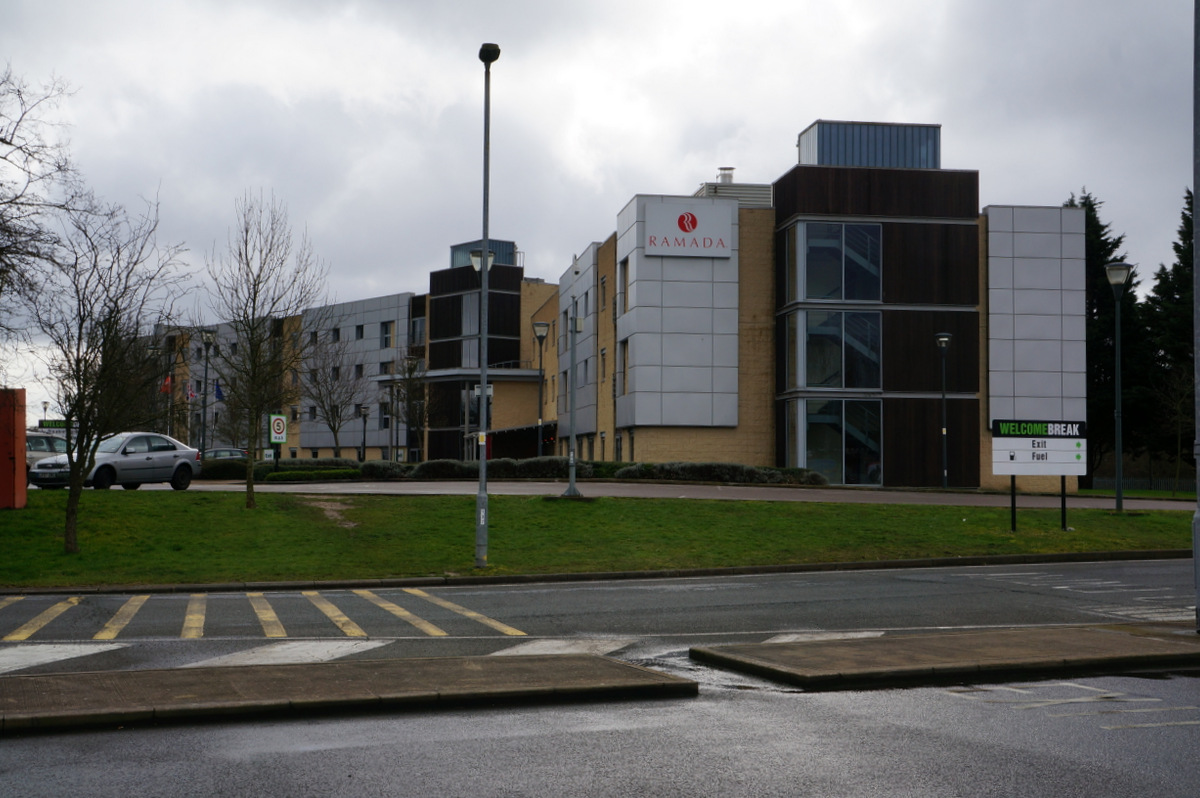
Ramada Hotel, London Gateway Services

== Layout ==
It has a separate, first, northbound approach, targeted at its hotel part, the roads of which are linked to the rest of the complex.

The entry and exit spur for the motorway's southbound carriageway cross (to and from) the services at a high point on the west side. The service station has an unusual give way for the entry spur mentioned (vehicles coming from the north must give way).

To the far south is a linked, controlled access, emergency vehicle road to/from Ellesmere Avenue.

Next southbound: None	Motorway service stations on the M1 motorway	Next northbound: Toddington
