= Toddington services =

Motorway service station in Bedfordshire, England

Toddington Services
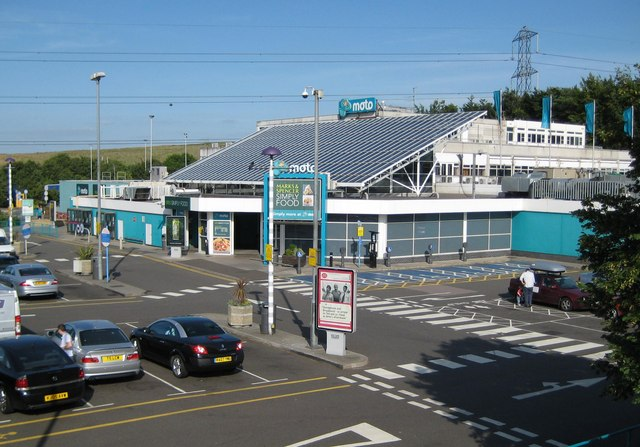
- The main building.

- Location in Bedfordshire, England Location on the UK motorway network

Information
- County: Bedfordshire
- Road: M1
- Coordinates: 51.9478°N 0.5021°W
- Operator: Moto Hospitality
- Previous operator: Granada
- Date opened: 8 March 1965
- Website: moto-way.com/services/toddington-northbound/

Toddington Services is a motorway service station on the M1 motorway between junctions 11A and 12, just north of Luton and Dunstable in Bedfordshire, England. It takes its name from the nearby village of Toddington. It is owned by Moto Hospitality.

== History ==
=== Planning ===
It was announced in October 1961 as the third motorway service area of Granada Group, of Golden Square, and was given the contract in early July 1962, for over 1,000 people, 60 petrol and diesel pumps. It would be 14 acres, the first transport cafe for truckers on a British motorway.

=== Construction ===
Work began on 29 July 1963, to be completed by April 1964. The £211,660 first phase was for the foundations and the petrol infrastructure, and car parks, but not the main building itself. At the time A. Monk Ltd, of Padgate, were building five miles of the M1 from Kirby Muxloe to Markfield in Leicestershire, which would take 23 months from January 1963. In April 1964, Monk Ltd were handed the second £422,334 contract to build the rest of the site.

On Thursday 30 April 1964, when erecting a metal lamp post on the motorway, 35 year old, father of four, Joseph McGuire of Moorgate St, Liverpool, was electrocuted, when a crane jib touched the 275kV transmission line that crosses the site. He was taken to Luton and Dunstable Hospital, where he died. Two other 30 year old workers, from Walker Installations, of Great Howard Street in Liverpool, were injured with burns to their hands and feet. The architect was CH Elsom & Sons of London.

=== Opening ===
Toddington Services partially opened at Whitsun in the spring of 1964; the rest of the main 800-seat restaurant opened on 8 March 1965.

The section of M1 it is on opened in November 1959. When opened, it was the first service area on the journey north from London on the M1, and the UK's largest. It was the UK's eighth motorway service station, and the M1's third service area; the M1 had the UK's first two motorway service areas.

It was Granada Motorway Services's first motorway service area; its next would be Frankley in the north of Worcestershire on the M5 in 1966. Granada Motorway Services Ltd (now called Moto Motorway Services) was incorporated on 28 August 1962.

== Structure ==
Around one mile south, on the western side of the M1, is the large Sundon Substation in Chalton, a terminus of many pylon lines of the National Grid. The eastern side of the car park (trucks) is underneath a 275 kV pylon line, which terminates at Sundon. Around 300 m (980 ft) to the east is the Midland Main Line, between Harlington railway station (to the north) and Leagrave railway station (to the south). The site is accessed off the motorway via a private road from the B530, which connects to junction 12 (A5120, for Flitwick and Woburn) to the north. The Icknield Way passes east-west north and south of the site.

== In popular culture ==
As a location in the 1972 film Fear In the Night.

In the last episode of BBC's Knowing Me Knowing You radio series in 1993, Alan Partridge's last guest dies on air. Partridge decides to observe a minute's silence, but realises - as it is radio - that a minute of 'dead air' is impossible. He therefore intersperses the silence with an occasional utterance. Thus he suggests to listeners on the road to pull off and join in the minute's silence. He even goes as far as naming a few service stations where they can park their cars. One of them is Toddington. In episode two of the television series Knowing Me Knowing You Partridge introduces his guest Daniella Forrest (Minnie Driver) with another reference to Toddington: "So, now, my first guest is intelligent, witty, a woman of the world with a figure that would stop the traffic dead, both ways on the M1 if she were to wiggle across the footbridge at Toddington Service Station."

In 2004, Toddington Services featured in series 4, episode 3 of Top Gear with the three presenters comparing a Volvo 760, Audi 80 and Rover 416GTi before proceeding up the M1 and M6 to Old Trafford.

| Next southbound: London Gateway | Motorway service stations on the M1 motorway | Next northbound: Newport Pagnell |
