= Watford, Northamptonshire =

Village and civil parish in England

Coordinates: 52.315°N 1.117°W

Watford
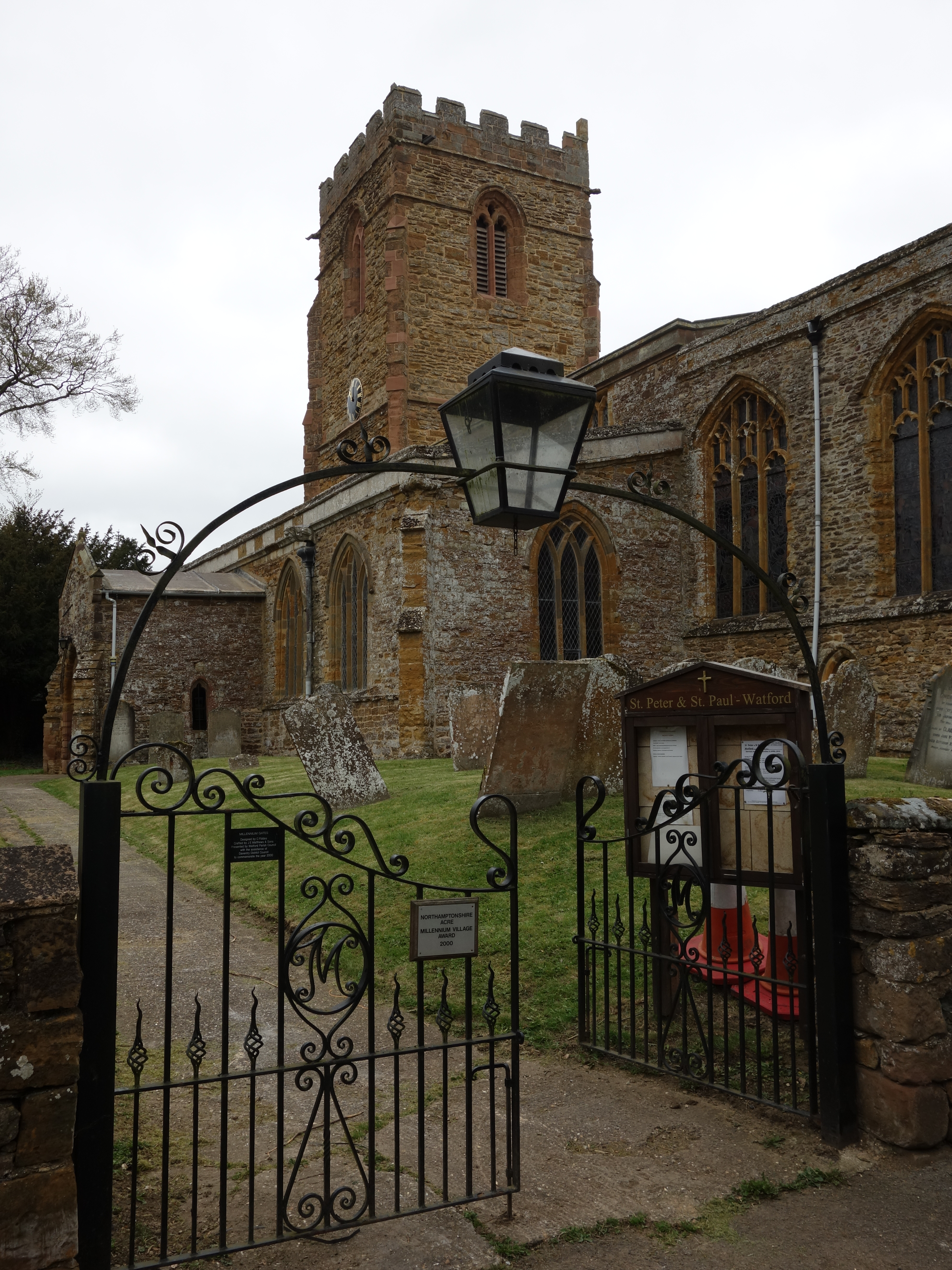
- St Peter & St Paul's Church

- Location within Northamptonshire
- Population: 320 (2011)
- OS grid reference: SP6068
- Unitary authority: West Northamptonshire
- Ceremonial county: Northamptonshire
- Region: East Midlands
- Country: England
- Sovereign state: United Kingdom
- Post town: Northampton
- Postcode district: NN6
- Dialling code: 01327
- Police: Northamptonshire
- Fire: Northamptonshire
- Ambulance: East Midlands
- UK Parliament: Daventry

Watford is a village and civil parish in West Northamptonshire in England. At the time of the 2001 census, the parish's population was 224 people, including Murcott and increasing to 320 at the 2011 Census. Watford is home to Watford Gap services, the UK's oldest motorway service station, located directly on the M1 motorway and alongside the West Coast Main Line.

== History of Watford ==
=== Roman era to the 5th century ===
It is known that the important Roman road Watling Street was constructed on the western boundary of the village. In the Roman era the Roman settlement of Bannaventa ('A Gap in the Hills'), with defensive earth and timber ramparts and a ditch, was situated about two miles south-west of Watford. Today some remains of the settlement such as building platforms, mounds and crop marks are still visible.

=== Anglo-Saxon period ===
After the departure of the Romans, the area eventually became part of the Anglo-Saxon kingdom of Mercia. Watford is mentioned as one of the lands belonging to Ethelgifu and was probably inherited from her own kindred. In the 7th century the Mercians converted to Christianity with the death of pagan King Penda. About 889 the area was conquered by the Danes and became part of the Danelaw – with Watling Street serving as the boundary. This was in effect until the area was recaptured by the English about 917 under Wessex King Edward the Elder, son of Alfred the Great. In 940 the Vikings of York captured Northamptonshire and devastated the area, with the county retaken by the English in 942. Northamptonshire is one of the few counties to have both Saxon and Danish town-names and settlements. This may be reflected in the place-name's etymology, where both Old Scandinavian 'vað' has been coupled with its English translation, 'ford'. Alternatively, the first element may be a Scandinavianised form of original Old English 'gewæd', with the same meaning, or else Old English 'wāþ' ('hunting').

=== 1066 and later ===
In 1066 the local Saxon lord is recorded as Thor, a common Scandinavian name that may have dated back to the Viking invasions of several centuries prior. The first known recording of the affairs of Watford village is in the Domesday Book of 1086. At that time Watford was considered a fairly large village with a population that could have been more than 100 people. By 1086 the Saxons had been ousted by the Normans and Gilbert the Cook was Lord and Tenant-in-Chief of Watford and another parish. Baldwin was the son and successor of Gilbert in the reign of King Henry I. By the time Baldwin died in the first year of Henry II, Watford was held by the Barony of Brunn which was held by Baldwin. The Barony and Watford with it passed to the husband of one of Baldwin's daughters, Hugo Wac, who became the Baron of Brunn succeeding his wife's father.

=== Medieval era ===
Watford has extensive settlement remains for an earlier form of the village in the medieval era. There is a stone building, and remains of gardens, traces of medieval dwellings, house-sites, paddocks, etc. Additionally, there are reconstructed cottages from this era. The significance of the medieval village remains is underscored by the adjoining ridge and furrow, evidence of an extensive medieval cultivation system which provided rich, well-drained land for crop planting.

== Present day ==
Watford is close to the nationally known Watford Gap motorway service station. The original "North of Watford" expression was already in use many years before the Watford Gap Service Station or M1 opened in 1959. It is possible that the original phrase referred to the much larger town of Watford in Hertfordshire, which was the last urban stop on the main railway line out of London to the north of England. There is evidence to support this, as the phrase "North of Watford Junction" was used with similar meaning in the past, referring to Watford Junction railway station at Watford, Hertfordshire. Watford gives its name to the Watford Locks on the Grand Union Canal. Christadelphians have been using the village hall for meetings since the 2000s.

From 1838 until 1958, the village was served by nearby Welton railway station.

== Notable buildings ==
The Historic England website contains details of 21 listed buildings and one scheduled monument in the parish of Watford. All of the listed buildings are Grade II except for St Peter & St Paul's Church which is Grade I. The properties concerned include:

- St Peter & St Paul's Church, Church Street
- Tile House, Main Street
- Watford Park: Remains of an 18th-century garden overlying the shrunken medieval village of Watford and associated ridge and furrow cultivation.

== Notable residents ==
Pilgrim Father Thomas Rogers was born in Watford about 1572. He was the son of William Rogers and his wife Eleanor. He married Alice Cosford at Watford in 1597 and had six children baptised there between 1599 and 1613. The family joined the Separatist Church at Leiden in the Netherlands sometime after 1613. Thomas Rogers became a citizen of Leiden on 25 June 1618, and records state he was a merchant of camlet cloth (a combination of silk and camelhair). It is possible Alice Rogers died sometime before 1620 since, per 1622 records, a woman named Elizabeth (Elsgen), possibly his second wife, cared for the Rogers children left behind when Thomas and his son Joseph sailed for the New World.

Thomas Rogers and his son Joseph, aged about 18, went to North America on the Pilgrim ship Mayflower in 1620, while his other children remained in the Netherlands. Some of those children are known to have later gone to New England. Thomas died, as did many other Mayflower passengers, during that first winter in Plymouth Colony, 1620–21. His son Joseph survived to live a long life as a person of note in the colony.
