= Newport Pagnell services =

Motorway services in Buckinghamshire, England

Newport Pagnell Services
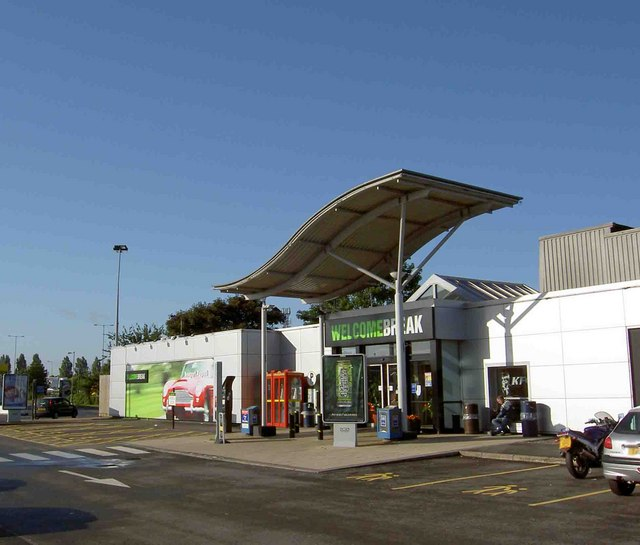

- Location in Buckinghamshire, England Location on the UK motorway network

Information
- County: Buckinghamshire
- Road: M1
- Coordinates: 52.0831°N 0.7485°W
- Operator: Welcome Break
- Date opened: 2 November 1959
- Website: welcomebreak.co.uk/locations/newport-pagnell/

Newport Pagnell Services is a motorway service station between junctions 14 and 15 of the M1 motorway near Newport Pagnell in the City of Milton Keynes, north Buckinghamshire, England. It is owned and operated by Welcome Break.

== History ==
=== Planning ===
The proposals for the site were read to Newport Pagnell Rural District council on Wednesday 29 May 1957 at Little Linford. Most of the site, on the northbound is in Great Linford.

Four service stations on the M1 were planned - each of 10 acres (4.0 ha) - Toddington, Newport Pagnell, Rothersthorpe, and one near Ashby St Ledgers in Northamptonshire. The petrol site was run by Blue Star Garages.

=== Licensing squabble ===
In February 1960, North Buckinghamshire Licensing Magistrates was asked to approve a table licence for alcoholic drinks, which was refused by the twelve magistrates (eight men and four women), in a two and a half hours hearing. The application had been made by Hubert Pinder. The British Travel and Holiday Association wanted the alcohol licence, as it thought that overseas visitors would be puzzled to be refused alcohol. Motorway service stations were licensed in Germany and Italy, and open all night.

Against the alcohol licensing were Superintendent Laurence Harman, of the local police, and Brigadier Sir Richard Gambier-Parry, who had business interests in breweries in Northamptonshire and Cambridgeshire. Other opposition included the vicar (Rev J.J. Williams, who admitted that he was not a teetotaller) from the local PCC, representatives from the Buckingham branch of the Women's Total Abstinence Union (Mrs G Greenstreet from Penn, Buckinghamshire), the Baptist (Rev Arthur Davies) and Methodist churches; in the UK, the temperance movement was supported by the nonconformist churches, such as the Methodists or Quakers. The Methodist Sir Titus Salt built the model village Saltaire without any pubs, and likewise Quaker George Cadbury built Bournville without any pubs. But there were pubs alongside most non-motorway roads. Grantham North services, as Tony's Cafe, was granted a table licence for its restaurant, by local magistrates, in April 1968.

The site would cost £120,000 for catering, and £200,000 for the whole site. Eric Fisher was to be the architect. (Note: About £2 million and £4 million today, based on the Retail Prices Index of inflation.) Representing Pinder was James Burge, who said that the people opposing were delivering propaganda, and were seeking to 'apply prohibition on the motorway'; he added that 'prohibition would ensure that perhaps 30 or 40 people in a coach could not have a drink with their meals'. In the plans, alcohol would be provided only with meals. Due to the refusal of the table licence, Forte reduced the restaurants from four to three, reducing the construction cost from £120,000 to £90,000. The high-class expensive restaurant, requiring the table licence, would not be built. Mr H Henshall, the managing director, said that there would be a snack bar, a self-service unit, and a grill and griddle, with waiter service. The workforce would be reduced from 100 to 75.

=== Opening ===
Newport Pagnell Services was one of the first two service stations to be opened in the UK, when both it and Watford Gap opened for fuel (only) on 2 November 1959. It was the first to open catering facilities: the northbound café opened on Monday 15 August 1960, and the southbound restaurant followed on 17 September 1960. The cost was £250,000, (Note: About £5 million today) to employ 82 catering staff. It was the first time that the 'services' sign was seen on UK roads, previously to this it had been a 'fuel' sign. The site was built by Laing.

Like the motorway, the site was designed by Sir Owen Williams. The services were opened by Forte, and were taken over by Welcome Break in 1988.

The service station is one of fourteen for which large murals were commissioned from artist David Fisher in the 1990s, designed to reflect the local area and history.

=== Food ===
The quick service cafeteria, seating 200, opened at 8 am on Monday 15 August 1960. The grill and griddle restaurant, with waitress service, opened on Wednesday or Thursday, later that week. In the late 1980s the cafeteria was replaced by the self-service Granary Barbecue, which served a beefburger for £3.95 and sirloin steak for £5.95 in 1990. Sweets, priced at £1.35 each in 1990, now included cheesecakes and Black Forest gateau. The site was soon serving 40,000 customers a week.

=== Crash barriers ===
The first crash barriers on British motorways were built, at a cost of £2 million, southwards from Newport Pagnell to Scratchwood from May 1971, being finished in late October 1971, as far north as the M6 junction in Northamptonshire. On Sunday 2 May 1971, late in the evening, 35 year old Ken Loach was driving towards London, and his estate car was knocked onto the central reservation, where his wife was injured, his wife's grandmother was killed, with his five year old son Nicholas.

== In the news ==
On 3 September 2007, a National Express coach from Birmingham to Luton Airport and Stansted Airport (making an unscheduled stop) failed to make a turn on the approach road and overturned. A number of people including the driver were seriously injured. The driver was subsequently convicted of drink driving and dangerous driving.

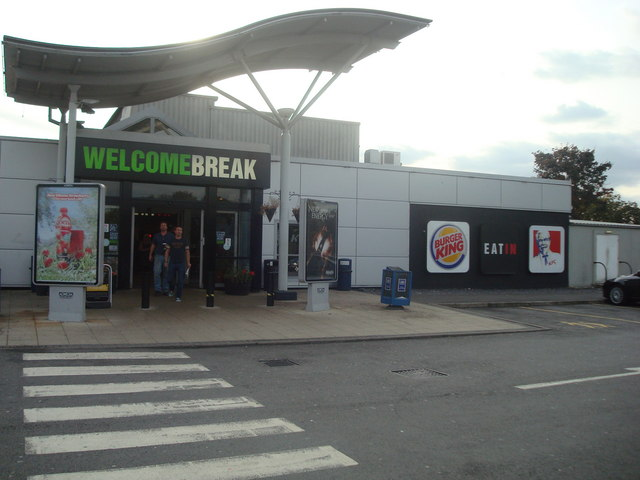
Southbound entrance

== Notes ==
Next southbound: Toddington	Motorway service stations on the M1 motorway	Next northbound: Northampton
