= Watford Gap services =

Motorway services in Northamptonshire, England

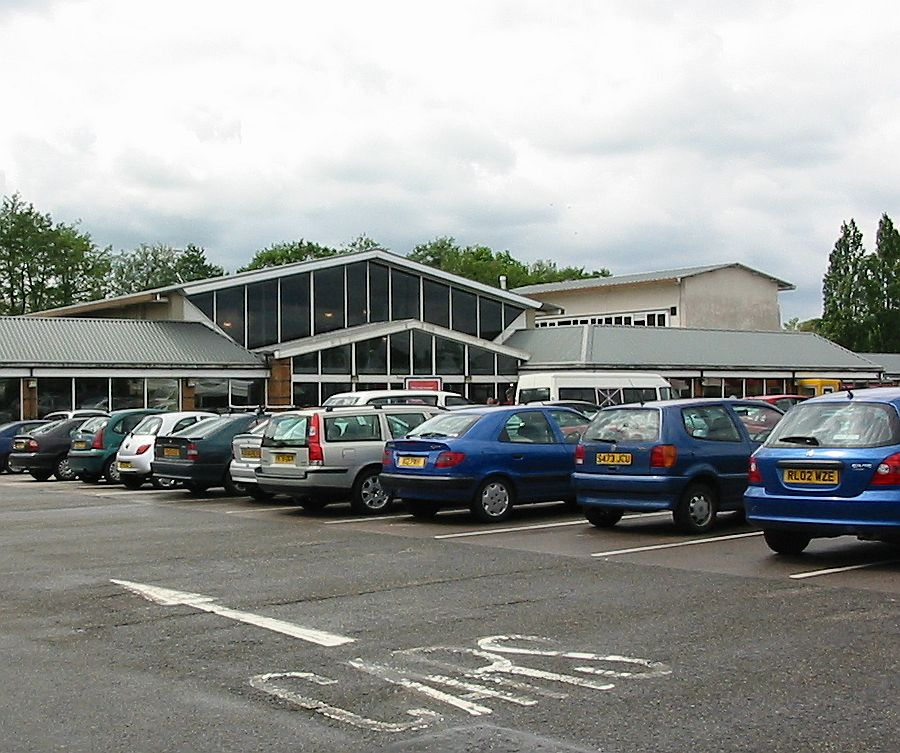
- Watford Gap services (northbound)

- Location in Northamptonshire, England Location on the UK motorway network

Information
- County: Northamptonshire
- Road: M1
- Coordinates: 52.3069°N 1.1226°W
- Operator: Roadchef
- Previous operator: Blue Boar
- Date opened: 2 November 1959
- Website: www.roadchef.com/locations/watford-gap

Watford Gap services are motorway services on the M1 motorway in Northamptonshire, England. They opened on 2 November 1959, the same day as the M1, making them one of the oldest motorway services in Britain. The facilities were originally managed by Blue Boar, a local company that had run a nearby petrol station before the M1 opened. Roadchef bought the services from Blue Boar in 1995.

The main building was designed by Harry Weedon, the architect for Odeon Cinemas, while the layout and general buildings were designed by coordinating architect Owen Williams. The main building was not ready on opening, so food was served from temporary sheds. The restaurant opened in September 1960, but due to the site's reputation as a truck stop, was redesigned in 1964 to accommodate a waitress service. The services became a meeting place for rock bands in the 1960s, including the Beatles, the Rolling Stones, Pink Floyd and Jimi Hendrix, as it provided a convenient place to sit down and eat a meal in the early hours of the morning. Hendrix was said to have mistaken the rest stop for a nightclub, having heard about the hotspot from other musicians. In the 1970s, the quality of the services declined and the food came in for harsh criticism from journalists and artists, such as Roy Harper. Since purchase in 1995, Roadchef have refurbished the premises. They have promoted its history, including the association with a north / south divide, and its regular use by 1960s rock musicians. A number of events took place to celebrate the 50th anniversary in November 2009, including a musical about the services.

The services are named after the nearby Watford Gap, a crossing point of the limestone ridge just north of the village of Watford; the name is unrelated to that of the town of Watford in Hertfordshire.

== Location ==
The services are in Northamptonshire, England close to the village of Watford about 8 miles (13 km) to the south east of Rugby, 5 miles (8 km) north of Daventry and approximately 75 miles (121 km) to the north west of London. They are situated between junctions 16 and 17 of the M1 with a single site for each direction on the motorway linked by a footbridge. The name comes from the nearby Watford Gap, the narrowest and lowest point in the limestone ridge that crosses England diagonally from the Cotswolds to Lincoln Edge. In Roman Britain, Iter II, later named Watling Street, crossed the gap; Thomas Telford considered the route unsuitable for coach traffic due to the presence of quicksand. Today, this is reflected in the modern road network by the A5 suddenly turning left towards Kilsby near the services. Similarly, the Grand Union Canal (which runs immediately behind the northbound vehicle park) avoided the gap by the Crick Tunnel. Consequently, the Roman Road at Watford Gap was largely untouched by previous engineering works when the M1 was constructed, and the engineers were able to build over it.

In popular culture, the Watford Gap is often considered to be a dividing line that separates the north and the south of England. The phrase "north of the Watford gap" may be shortened to "north of Watford", inviting confusion with the larger town of Watford further south in Hertfordshire that is also linked by the M1. Roadchef have suggested that the services' name should be included in the Oxford English Dictionary as an expression of the divide between the north and south.

== History ==
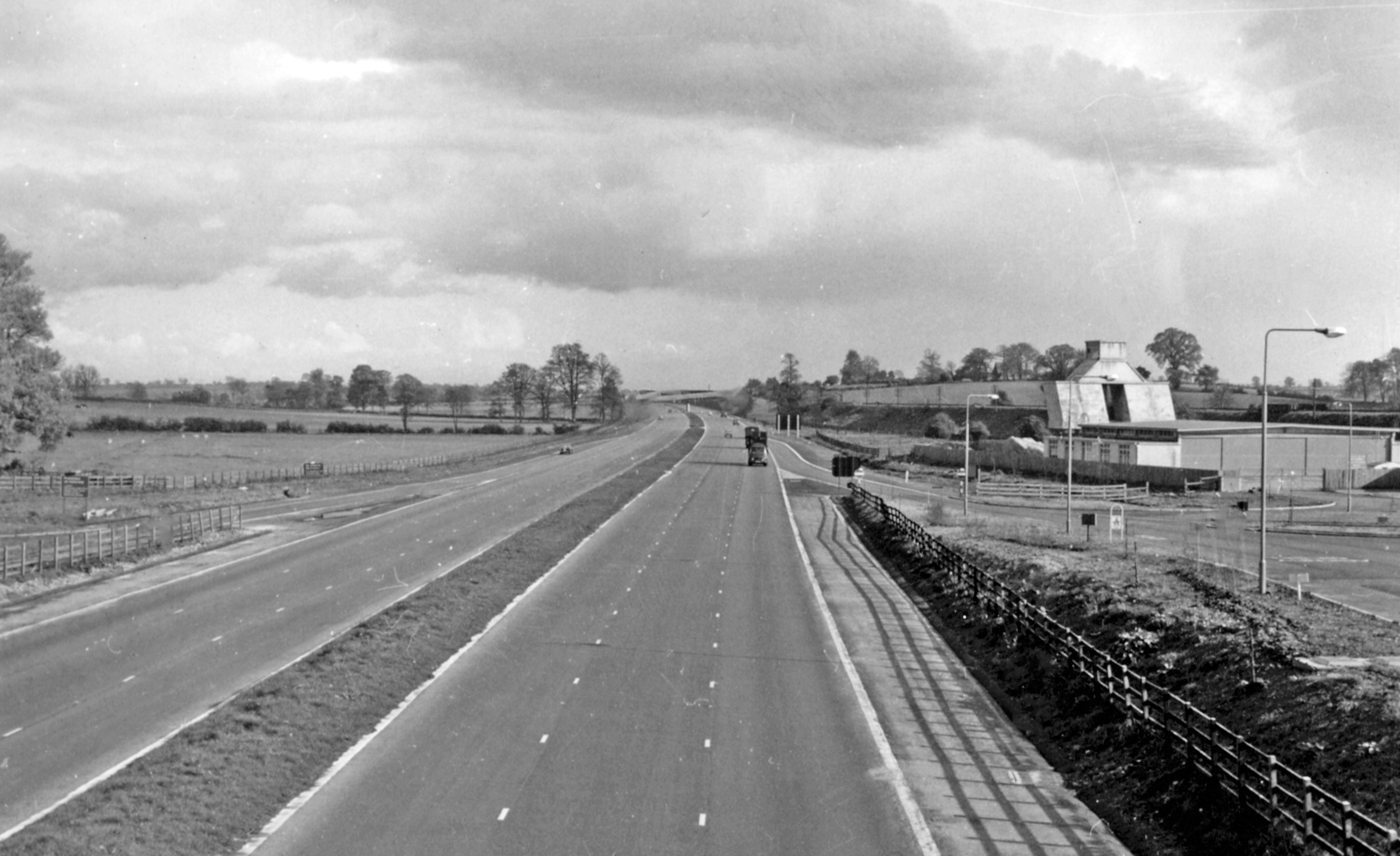
The M1 and Watford Gap Services in 1961

The services were one of the first of their kind in the UK, opening alongside Newport Pagnell as the first two service areas on 2 November 1959, at the same time as the new M1 motorway. They evolved from discussions during 1955 and 1956 by the Ministry of Transport over what facilities should be present on new motorways. Civil engineer Owen Williams visited the United States to see what existing rest areas were available, and based his designs on these. Watford Gap was chosen as one of four pilot sites, though by 1958 the Ministry had decided only this and Newport Pagnell services would open with the motorway.

The land on which the services were built belonged to the Thorntons of Brockhall Hall, who had owned the manor since 1625. The family had previously attempted to block the Grand Union Canal and the main London–Birmingham railway across the gap, without success. Brock Hall was eventually sold in 1969 and converted into flats.

The structure was built on the site of derelict farm buildings. There were different designers for different parts of the service area, with Owen Williams as the coordinating architect. An ornate design for a footbridge by Clough Williams-Ellis was rejected in favour of a more functional and conservative modernist design by Owen Williams. When the services opened the new buildings were incomplete, so the food was served from temporary sheds. The original plan had been for trucks to use this service station, and for cars to use Newport Pagnell. In practice, however, both service areas were unrestricted. The first owners of the services were Blue Boar Limited, a family company that owned a nearby petrol station on the A5. Although the official name has always been Watford Gap, the services were colloquially called "Blue Boar" for some time after opening.

The original buildings at Watford Gap were designed by Harry W Weedon and Partners, already well known for their work for Odeon Cinemas. The restaurant opened in September 1960, but the Ministry were unhappy about the services' reputation as a truck-stop, dating back to Blue Boar's popularity with HGV drivers. They consequently redesigned the restaurant in 1964 to accommodate a waitress service, which they hoped would "lose at least some of the stigma of having been started in 1959 as primarily a commercial driver's facility". Food was criticised for being expensive, though Scottish Unionist MP Tam Galbraith disputed this, noting he could buy steak and kidney pie with chips, buttered roll and a cup of tea at Watford Gap for 4s 2d (£0.21, equivalent to £3.69 in 2025).

By the 1970s, the quality of the food had declined substantially and, because it was also in a prominent location, the services became a byword for poor catering. Roy Harper wrote a song criticising the food at the Watford Gap on his 1977 album, Bullinamingvase, writing: "Watford Gap, Watford Gap / A plate of grease and a load of crap". The owners of Watford Gap service station objected to criticism of their food, as did an EMI board member who was also a non-executive director of Blue Boar. Harper defended his decision to write the song, claiming the food was "junk. Absolute junk". In 1989, one journalist claimed the services had some of the worst food found on the road network, adding "if I threw the toast out of the window, it would probably still be bouncing up the M1." Roadchef purchased the motorway businesses from Blue Boar in 1995 and have since improved facilities. In 2011 and 2012 it was rated as 3 stars by quality assessors at Visit England.

Roadchef celebrated the services' 50th anniversary on 2 November 2009 by selling cups of tea at 1959 prices. A road sign was erected pointing to "The North" and "The South" on the same day. As part of the anniversary celebrations, local film-maker and composer Benjamin Till created a musical about Watford Gap. The show featured stories from eighty people who had worked or been associated with the services, including local residents who remembered the services opening.

== Notable visitors ==
Though the Ministry of Transport was adamant that the services should not be destinations in their own right, they did acquire a reputation for being a popular place for motorists to visit. During the 1960s, the services were a regular stopping venue for bands such as Pink Floyd. The Beatles stopped at Watford Gap while travelling from Liverpool to gigs in the south in the early stage of their career. Jimi Hendrix heard so much about "Blue Boar", as the services were then popularly known, that he thought it was a London nightclub. Gerry Marsden, leader of the Pacemakers regularly visited the services when touring, saying it was good for "a quick stop and a quick nosh." Pink Floyd's Nick Mason recalls Hendrix stopping off at the services at 2am, while The Zombies' Chris White thought the services were "the feeding trough of the beat boom". Harper claimed "everybody would meet at Watford Gap because it was the one place after a show where you were guaranteed a bit of a sit-down at 2am".

The services' association with 1960s musicians is remembered in a set of photographs published in 2008 of the Stones stopping at Watford Gap on the way to ATV Studios, Birmingham, in 1963. In 2009, Roadchef paid a former employee £1,000 for autographs she had collected while working there, including those of Paul McCartney, Mick Jagger, Keith Richards, Brian Jones, Dusty Springfield and Cliff Richard. In July 2011, music journalist Peter Paphides presented Late Nights at the Blue Boar, a BBC Radio 4 documentary about the connection between the services and Britain's 1960s rock bands.

Next southbound: Northampton	Motorway service stations on the M1 motorway	Next northbound: Leicester Forest East
