= M1 motorway =

First inter-urban motorway in the UK

M1
- London–Yorkshire motorway
- M1 highlighted in blue
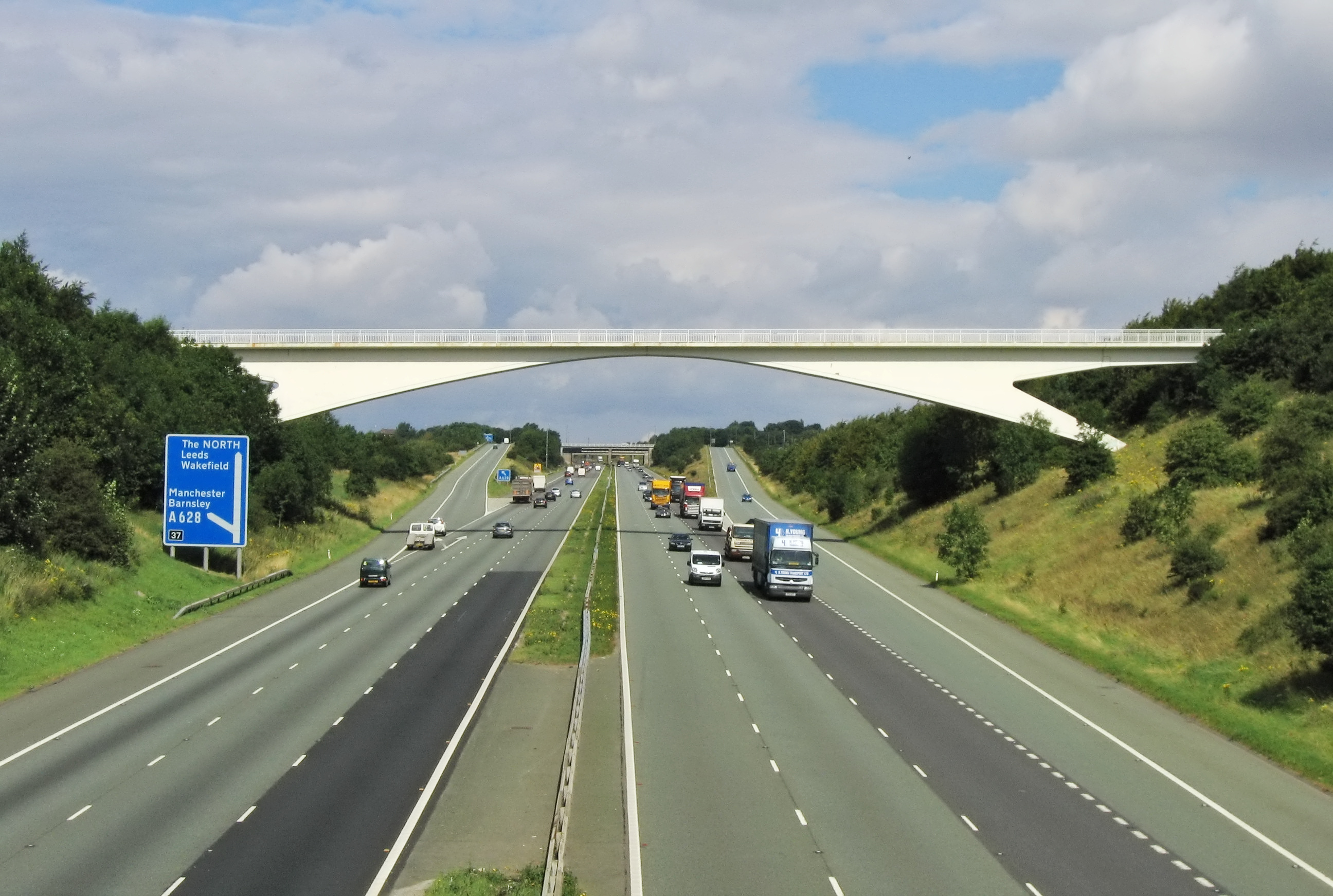
- Looking north towards junction 37 on one of the few stretches that remain three-lane, 2007

Route information
- Part of E13
- Maintained by National Highways
- Length: 193.5 mi (311.4 km)
- Existed: 1959–present
- History: Opened: 1959; Completed: 1999

Major junctions
- South end: Staples Corner; 51.5755°N 0.2351°W
- J6a → M25 motorway J17 → M45 motorway J19 → M6 motorway J21 → M69 motorway J32 → M18 motorway J42 → M62 motorway J43 → M621 motorway A1(M) motorway
- North end: Hook Moor; 53.8229°N 1.3388°W

Location
- Country: United Kingdom
- Constituent country: England
- Counties: Greater London; Hertfordshire; Bedfordshire; Buckinghamshire; Northamptonshire; Leicestershire; Nottinghamshire; Derbyshire; South Yorkshire; West Yorkshire
- Primary destinations: London; Brent Cross; Watford; St Albans; Hemel Hempstead; Luton; Milton Keynes; Northampton; Rugby; Leicester; Loughborough; Nottingham; Derby; Mansfield; Chesterfield; Sheffield; Rotherham; Barnsley; Wakefield; Leeds

Road network
- Roads in the United Kingdom; Motorways; A and B road zones

The M1 motorway connects London to Leeds, where it joins the A1(M) near Aberford, to connect to Newcastle. It was the first inter-urban motorway to be completed in the UK; the first motorway in the country was the Preston Bypass, which later became part of the M6.

The motorway is 193 miles (311 km) long and was constructed in four phases. Most of the motorway was opened between 1959 and 1968. The southern end was extended in 1977 and the northern end was extended in 1999.

It is also the second longest motorway in the country with the M6 motorway being the longest at 232 miles (373 km).

== History ==
There had been plans before the Second World War for a motorway network in the United Kingdom. Lord Montagu of Beaulieu formed a company to build a 'motorway-like road' from London to Birmingham in 1923, but it was a further 26 years before the Special Roads Act 1949 was passed, which allowed for the construction of roads limited to specific vehicle classifications, and in the 1950s, the country's first motorways were given the government go-ahead.

The first section of motorway was the Preston Bypass in Lancashire, now part of the M6 motorway, which opened in 1958. The M1 was Britain's first full-length motorway and opened in 1959. The early M1 had no speed limits, crash barriers, or lighting, and had soft shoulders rather than hard. As there was then little traffic, London musicians such as the Rolling Stones were known to speed up to take advantage of the Watford Gap Motorway Services Area, open 24 hours at a time when pubs closed at 11 p.m.

=== First section, 1959 ===
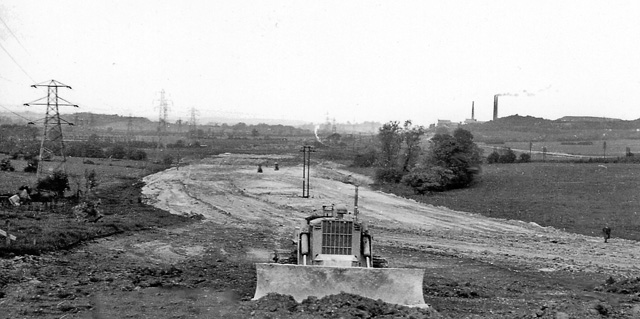
Looking north from B579 bridge at Chalton. Former cement works at Sundon to the right (May 1958)

The first section of the motorway, between junction 5 (Watford) and junction 18 (Crick/Rugby), opened on 2 November 1959, together with the motorway's two spurs, the M10 (from junction 7 to south of St Albans originally connecting to the A1) and the M45 (from junction 17 to the A45 and Coventry). Parts of the Hertfordshire section were built using steam rollers.

The M1 was officially inaugurated from Slip End (close to Luton), celebrated by a large concrete slab on the bridge next to the village, with inscription "London-Yorkshire Motorway – This slab was sealed by the Harold Watkinson M.P. – Minister of Transport – Inauguration Day – 24th March 1958". It was relocated, during widening works in 2007–08, to the eastern side of junction 10.

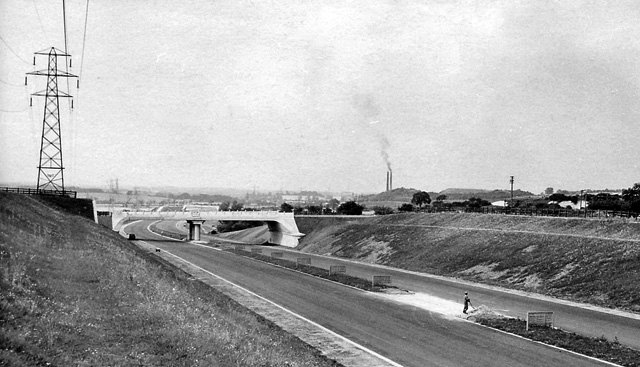
Looking north from a similar position south of Toddington services (July 1959)

This section of the M1 broadly follows the route of the A5 north-west. It started at the Watford Bypass (A41), which runs south-east to meet the A1 at Apex corner, and ended on the A5 at Crick. The M10 spur motorway connected the M1 to the North Orbital Road (A405/A414, a precursor of the M25) where it also met the A5 (now renumbered here as the A5183) and, 2 miles (3.2 km) to the east via the A414, the A6, which subsequently became part of the M25.

A £1.5 million contract was given in May 1958 for the most southerly section, from Aldenham to Beechtrees (the M10 junction), for two lanes of reinforced concrete, to open in November 1959. There was immense flooding on this section in July 1958.

Although the whole of the first section opened in 1959, it was built in two parts, with the northern part (junctions 10 to 18) being built by John Laing and the southern part (the St Albans Bypass) being built by Tarmac Construction.

The headquarters of the Laing project was on Wolverton Road in Newport Pagnell. The motorway was opened by Ernest Marples at the Pepperstock junction (junction 10), previously a motorway spur, now the A1081. The two motorway projects, the St Albans Bypass and the Pepperstock-Crick section met at Luton.

On the opening of the M1, the first person to reach the Birmingham end of the new section of motorway was anaesthetist Eric Plumpton (Dr Frederic Salkeld Plumpton, 1933–2016) in his Triumph TR2, travelling 23 miles (37 km) from Upper Heyford, Northamptonshire in 14 minutes at an average speed of 98.5 mph (158.5 km/h), at about 10.10 am. The northern end of the M1 and M45 opened at 9.56 am.

The Beechtrees to Berrygrove two-lane section, of six miles, was to be widened to four lanes from 1972.

=== Safety record ===
There were no numbered junctions until 1966, only names; the introduction of numbered junctions was announced on July 28 1966.

The AA had their motorway headquarters at Broughton, Milton Keynes. There were AA patrol vehicles from 8am to 8pm. The GPO installed 144 pillars on the side of the motorway, with a breakdown telephone, on each side, at mile intervals.

A two-mile anti-dazzle metal mesh was installed at Chalton, Bedfordshire by the Road Research Laboratory from February 1960. There was much dazzle at night. The use of dipped headlights was not compulsory. The anti-dazzle mesh was removed in May 1965, after the accident rate increased. In 1965 two nine-mile lengths had experimental steel crash barriers installed by the Road Research Laboratory. The first nine-mile length was from Luton southwards, which cost £60,000. The next nine-mile length was nine miles south of Crick, with a wire rope barrier from late 1965.

The first fatal accident was on Friday November 6 1959 in thick fog, two miles from the north end, with two truck drivers from south London; a truck had hit a breakdown vehicle, from Kilsby, on the hard shoulder, and another truck had hit the back of this. British newspapers had intense coverage of any accident, with daily reports. At the inquest, the cause of the accident was the hard shoulder not having enough foundations; a 17-ton truck would sink. When M50 opened in November 1960, the hard shoulder would not support trucks. The motorway was reconstructed around 1966 to have better hard shoulders.

There were 25 fatalities in the first year. Many trucks had stayed on the A5; in mid-November 1959, 68% of the vehicles on the A5 were trucks.

In the first few years, a high number of animals, such as rabbits, were hit by cars on the M1, as the fencing was insufficient.

In April 1960 France imposed a national 60mph speed limit. A third of accidents were caused by colliding into the rear of another, mainly in the dark, according to the Road Research Laboratory. Truck rear lights were often barely visible, with no fog lights. Trucks could also drive in the fast lane.

In January 1965, the head of Bedfordshire traffic police, Superintendent E Burton, said that 9 out of 10 accidents were caused by drivers falling asleep. 45% of all road deaths in the UK were at night, in 1965.

By December 1965, the government was proposing to ban trucks from the fast lane, and the first fog light was developed. Trucks were banned from the fast lane for 15 months, from May 23 1966. Reflective rear number plates were tested in southern England in December 1965 by the Road Research Laboratory.

On January 24 1966, Bedfordshire Police first turned on yellow fog warning lights, with a mandatory 30mph speed limit in fog. The terrible motorway accidents in late 1965 also led to the introduction of regular traffic reports on BBC national radio from January 1966.

On August 27 1970, in 18 days, twelve people were killed, by vehicles crossing the central reservation, into oncoming traffic, and Michael Heseltine decided that crash barriers would be introduced as soon as possible. All of the M1 would have crash barriers by the end of 1971, and on the other motorways by the end of 1975. Up to November 1971, 563 people were killed on the M1. In the first twenty years 835 people died in accidents.

=== Charnwood Forest protest ===
In 1956 it was announced that the proposed route, from Misterton with Walcote to Markfield, would go right through the middle of the much-loved beauty spots of Charnwood Forest in what is now the Borough of Charnwood. 32,000 signatures of the 'Save Charnwood' petition were sent to parliament on 19 March 1958.

Geology in Charnwood Forest

The proposed unpopular route, in Charnwood, was opposed by the Leicestershire Ramblers Association, but not by Leicestershire County Council. This proposed route would never have got through a public enquiry. An alternative route was through the Soar Valley.

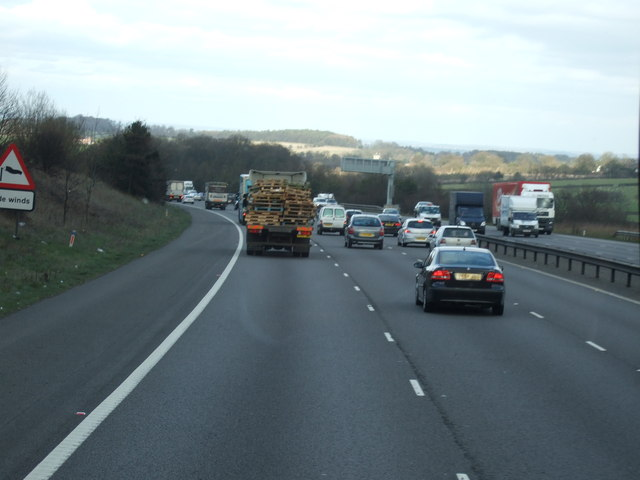
The motorway through the west of Charnwood Forest in March 2012

The altered route, mostly avoiding Charnwood Forest, was published on Wednesday 17 September 1958. The controversial £12m motorway section opened on Friday 22 January 1965 at the Leicester Forest East services, with the Bishop of Leicester in attendance.

=== Rugby to Leeds, 1965 to 1968 ===
The motorway was continued northwards from junction 18 towards Yorkshire in a series of extensions between 1965 and 1968. Diverging from the A5, the motorway takes a more northerly route through the East Midlands, via Leicester, Loughborough, Nottingham to Sheffield, where the M18 splits from the M1 at junction 32 to head to Doncaster.

In February 1964, at Lockington, Leicestershire, a 150 lb (68 kg) German bomb was found in the construction.

Originally, the M1 was planned to end at Doncaster, but it was decided to make what was going to be the "Leeds and Sheffield Spur" into the primary route, with the 11-mile (18 km) section to the A1(M) south of Doncaster given the separate motorway number M18.

From junction 32, the motorway passes Sheffield, Rotherham, Barnsley and Wakefield, reaching the original end of the motorway at (the original) junction 44 to the east of Leeds. There were plans to route the M1 from just south of junction 42, where it interchanges with the M62, round the west of Leeds to the A1 at Dishforth. However the chosen route passes to the east of Leeds. With the M62 and M621, the M1 forms a ring of motorways around the south of Leeds.

=== Leeds South Eastern Urban Motorway, 1972 ===
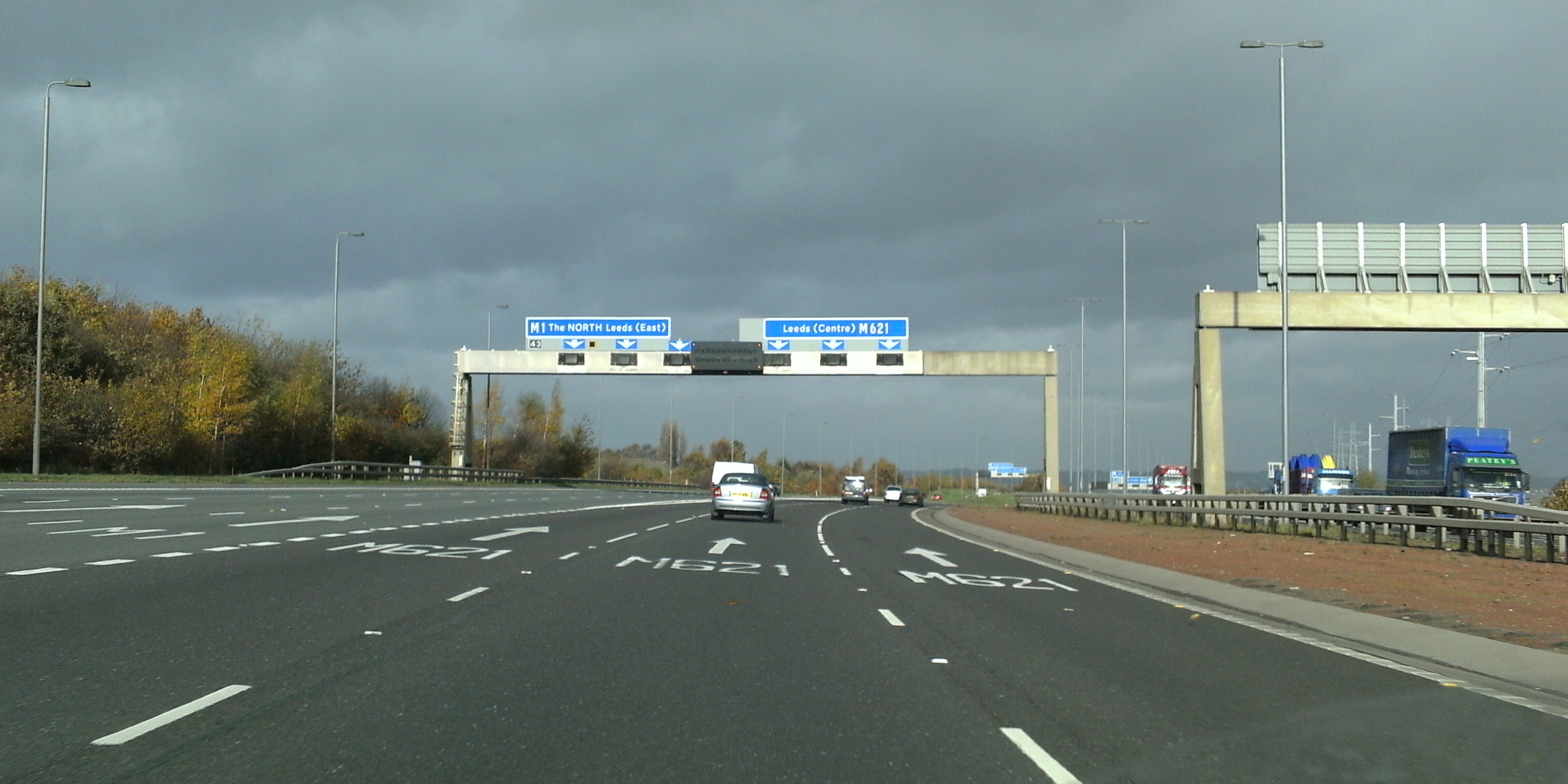
The M1 and M621 interchange on the northbound carriageways at Leeds

In 1972, an extension of the M1 was opened into central Leeds as the Leeds South Eastern Motorway, where it met the Leeds South Western Motorway (M621) coming north-east from the M62 at junction 3.

=== Lighting ===
In July 1972, the then UK Minister for Transport Industries, John Peyton, announced that 86 miles (138 km) of UK motorway particularly prone to fog would benefit from lighting in a project that "should be" completed by 1973. Sections to be illuminated included the M1 between junctions 3 and 14, and between junctions 16 and 24. In August 2011, the Highways Agency announced that, despite being converted to Smart Motorway status, the lights would be switched off on stretches of the motorway between junctions 10 (Luton) and 15 (Northampton) without affecting road user safety. The motorway junctions and their approaches, and a section of the M1 on either side of junction 11 (north Luton), would have lighting columns replaced and remain lit. All lighting columns from junctions 10 to 14 were removed completely, apart from some on slip roads.

=== Safety barriers ===
An increasing official interest in secondary safety was evident in an announcement in March 1973 that work would begin shortly on erecting "tensioned safety barriers" along the central reservation of a 34-mile (55 km) section of the M1 between Kegworth (J24) and Barlborough (J30).

=== Leeds to Hook Moor, 1999 ===
Between 1996 and 1999, the M1 section north of the M62 underwent a major reconstruction and extension to take the M1 on a new route to the A1(M) at Aberford. The new road involved the construction of a series of new junctions, bridges and viaducts to the east of Leeds. When the new section of M1 was completed and opened on 4 February 1999, the Leeds South Eastern Motorway section of the M1 was re-designated as the M621, and the junctions were given new numbers: M621 junctions 4 to 7.

=== London extensions, 1966, 1967 and 1977 ===
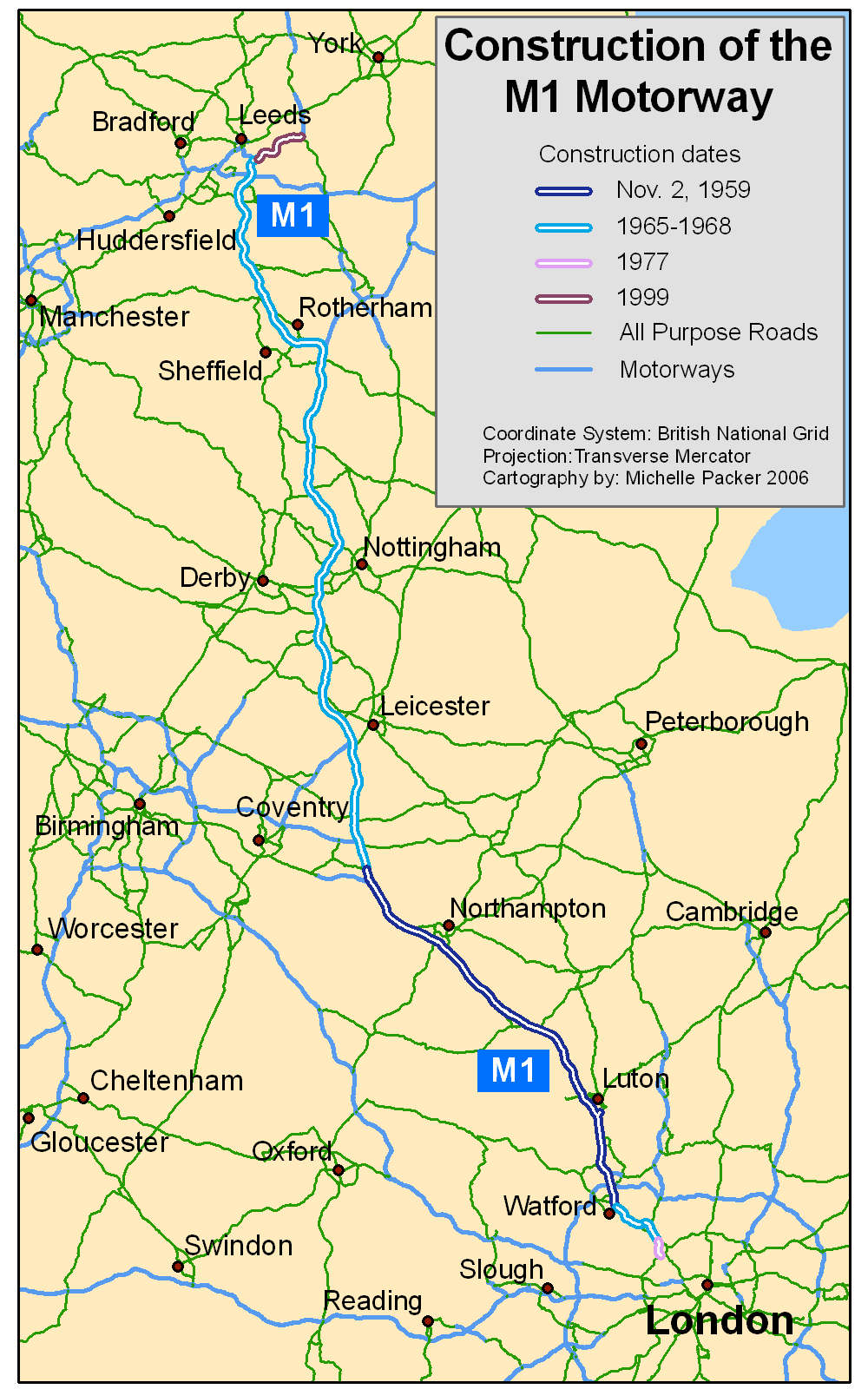
Map showing construction dates of sections of the M1

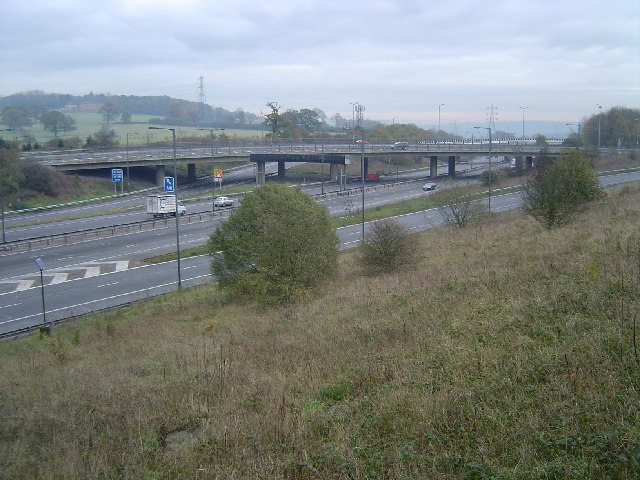
M1 at junction 4. The old overhead lane control gantries are still visible, which were replaced with newer, verge-mounted MS4 variable message signs in 2008.

The M1 was extended south towards London from its original starting point at junction 5, in three stages. The first stage, opened in 1966, took the motorway south-east, parallel to the A41, to meet the A5 at junction 4 south of Elstree. The second phase continued east to Scratchwood (London Gateway Services, which occupies the location of the missing junction 3, from where an unbuilt spur would have connected to the A1 at Stirling Corner to the north-east). The M1 then runs south alongside the Midland Main Line towards Hendon, where it meets the A1 again at junction 2 via a tightly curved flyover section. These flyovers connecting from the A1 were originally both for northbound traffic: the left one as the on-ramp to the M1, the right one going over the A1/A41 junction beneath to rejoin the A1 northbound.

Junction 2 is about 2.5 miles (4 km) south of the original junction 3. Before the completion of junction 2, southbound traffic left the motorway via a slip road which passed around the back of the now disused Homebase and under the A41/A1 Mill Hill Bypass, and looped round to join it at Fiveways Interchange. This slip road is still visible to southbound traffic approximately 650 yards (590 m) before junction 2, and was maintained until the early 2000s, even though not accessible to traffic. The northbound slip road from the A1 is now partially used as the entrance way to a retail park and was once carried by bridge, but no longer reaches the northbound carriageway, because it is cut off by the motorway continuing south.

The final section of the M1 was opened to junction 1 at Staples Corner in 1977. There the motorway meets the North Circular Road (A406) at a grade separated junction and roundabout. Unrealised plans from the 1960s would have seen the motorway continue through the junction on an elevated roadway to end at West Hampstead, where it would have met the North Cross Route, the northern section of the London Motorway Box, a proposed ring of urban motorway around the central area. The layout of the Staples Corner junction was originally built in accordance with those plans, although most of the London Ringways Plan had been cancelled by 1973. Around the same time, the section between the then-M10 and junction 5 was widened from the original two lanes to three.

On its completion, the M1 acted as a fast link road between London and Birmingham via the M6. It also provided a link to London Luton Airport for those regions, and its proximity to the site of the new town of Milton Keynes (designated in 1967) meant that it was soon providing a vital transport link to another major area.

=== Recent developments ===
In 2006, plans were published for the widening of 91 miles (146 km) from Leicester through to Leeds (junctions 21–42) to four lanes each way.

Escalating costs across the whole of the Highways Agency programme, including the M1 project, on which costs had risen to £5.1 billion, as well as increasing opposition to major road expansion, as well as criticisms by the Transport Select Committee and the National Audit Office, led to wide-ranging re-assessments of the Agency's project costs. Widening was scaled back to the junctions 6A to 10 scheme that was already in progress, and from Nottingham and Mansfield (junctions 25–28), and hard shoulder running was to be used for other sections.

Many later developments, including smart motorway schemes, have been made to the M1, and these are detailed below. Recent concerns about accidents and deaths on the former hard shoulder have led to a halt and review into extending all lane running which reported in July 2021.

== Developments ==
=== A5-M1 Link (Dunstable Northern Bypass) ===
A5-M1 Link (Dunstable Northern Bypass)
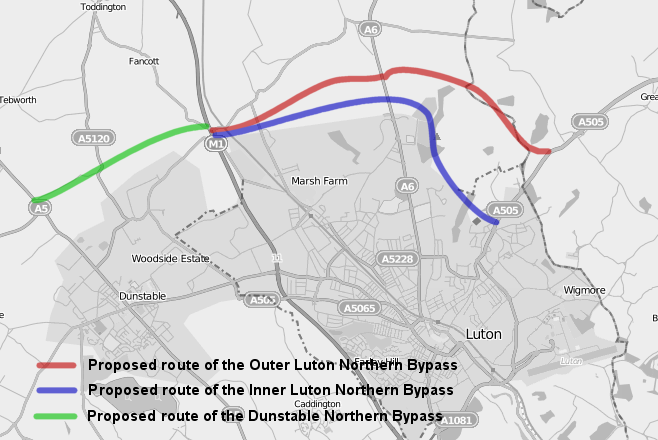
- The route of the Dunstable Northern Bypass proposal and route options for the connecting Luton Northern Bypass.
- Location: Central Bedfordshire
- Proposer: Highways Agency
- Status: Completed (summer 2017)
- Type: Road
- Cost estimate: £171 million to £217 million
- Geometry: KML

The A5-M1 Link (Dunstable Northern Bypass) is a two-lane dual carriageway running east from the A5 north of Dunstable joining the M1 at a new junction 11a south of Chalton. Here, it is intended to join with a proposed Luton Northern Bypass to form a northern bypass for the wider conurbation. The A5-M1 Link aims to alleviate traffic congestion in Houghton Regis and Dunstable, reduce journey times for long-distance traffic travelling through Dunstable and improve the regional economy. The Highways Agency detrunked the A5 through Dunstable when the A5-M1 Link opened to the public in May 2017. As part of the Dunstable Town Centre Masterplan, Central Bedfordshire Council built the 2.9 km (1.8 miles) Woodside Link to connect the new junction 11a to the industrial areas of Dunstable and Houghton Regis. Most of the road opened to traffic in autumn 2016 with the remaining section connecting to junction 11a.

=== M1/M69 junction ===
There is a proposal to widen the M1 to dual four-lane or dual five-lane between junctions 21 and 21a and construct a new link road between the M1 and the M69. During this work the Leicester Forest East services would be closed, and possibly relocated. Consultation took place in 2007. As of May 2022, work on this scheme has still not begun.

=== M1 junction 19 improvement ===
Following the report of a public inquiry in March 2013, the Secretary of State for Transport announced on 18 July 2013 that work to update the Catthorpe Interchange at junction 19, between the M1 motorway, M6 motorway and A14 road, close to Catthorpe, would go ahead. Work on the £191 million three-layer interchange started in January 2014. The scheme was fully opened to traffic in December 2016.

=== A421 dualling from Milton Keynes to M1 junction 13 ===
In conjunction with the M1 widening schemes and dualling of the A421 between M1 junction 13 and the A1 near St Neots, proposals were made to widen the A421 between the M1 junction 13 in Bedfordshire and the Kingston roundabout in Milton Keynes. Exhibitions were held in June 2005 which rejected proposals to re-route the road in favour of widening the current road. In 2005, the project was given an estimated total cost of £33 million.

Funding of £23.5 million was confirmed by the government for these works, as part of the South East Midlands Local Enterprise Partnership "Local Growth Deal". As part of the government's pinch point reduction programme, work commenced in 2014 on the A421 in Milton Keynes to improve the Kingston roundabout, and dual the section from it to (near) the Bedfordshire border, with the construction of two new roundabouts on the route. The road corridor includes a separate cycleway.

The upgrade work for this final phase of the plan, the section running from junction 13 to Eagle Farm roundabout, started in September 2018 and was completed in December 2020.

=== Smart Motorways ===
==== M1 widening and variable speed limits, junctions 6A to 10 (M25 to Luton South) ====
Work began on the 10-mile (16 km) section between the M25 and Luton (J6A-J10) in 2006 and opened in 2009, which included the construction of new parallel collector-distributor lanes between junctions 7 and 8.

The M10 spur was built as a motorway because it inevitably led to the M1, but as non-motorway traffic could now travel between the A414 at Hemel Hempstead and Park Street Roundabout without having to access the M1, the M10 was downgraded to an A road, and designated as part of the A414 to allow for this. The work also included widening or replacement of 11 underbridges on one or both carriageways, and replacing seven overbridges at a total cost of £294 million. A variable mandatory speed limit system was installed, making this the first smart motorway scheme on the M1.

==== M1 dynamic hard shoulder running, junctions 10 to 13 (Luton South to Milton Keynes South) ====
Work to introduce dynamic hard shoulder running on approximately 15 miles (24 km) of motorway between Luton and Milton Keynes (J10-J13) was completed in December 2012, at a total cost of £327 million. This made the hard shoulder available to be opened as a traffic lane where additional capacity was necessary. Modifications were made to junctions 11 and 12, to allow for four lanes running through each junction, and the A421 from junction 13 to the Bedford southern bypass was also upgraded to two lanes each way during this period. The scheme will likely be converted to all lane running at some point in the 2020 decade, alongside all other dynamic hard shoulder running schemes. This was because a Government review into smart motorways found dynamic hard shoulder running was too confusing for drivers, leading to plans to convert all dynamic hard shoulders into permanent running lanes.

==== M1 widening and variable speed limits, junctions 25–28 (Nottingham to Mansfield) ====
Work to widen the 15-mile (24 km) section from Nottingham to Mansfield (J25-J28) to four lanes each way began in October 2007 and was completed in May 2010, at a cost of £340 million. A 50 mph limit, enforced by average speed cameras, was imposed for the period of construction, but it proved to be so effective that a permanent variable mandatory speed limit system was installed. In 2023, following a previous debate on the issue, local MPs Mark Fletcher and Lee Anderson called on the government to upgrade junction 28, describing it as a "pinch point" disadvantaging local residents and businesses.

==== M1 widening and variable speed limits, junctions 13–16 (Milton Keynes South to Northampton West) ====
National Highways converted the existing 23-mile (37 km) section of the M1 between Milton Keynes and Northampton (J13-J16) into an all-lane-running (ALR) smart motorway consisting of four lanes running in both directions without a hard shoulder, with the project's cost being £373 million. Construction began in January 2018, with the scheme opening in stages until 9 March 2023, when the project was fully complete.

=== Other proposals ===
The speed limit between M1 junctions 33 to 34, near Rotherham, has been reduced to 60 mph, to reduce levels of nitrogen dioxide. The plans were to be implemented before October 2020, and as of August 2023 the speed limit reduction is still in place.

== Incidents and accidents ==
- On 12 October 1970, a woman, Barbara Mayo, was abducted and murdered whilst hitchhiking up the motorway from London to Yorkshire. She was found dead in Ault Hucknall near the motorway in Derbyshire. The murder has never been solved.
- On 16 March 1972, 200 vehicles crashed in thick fog resulting in the deaths of nine people on the M1 near Ridgmont, north of Luton.
- On 8 January 1989, British Midland Flight 92, a Boeing 737-400 aircraft crashed onto the embankment of the M1 whilst attempting an emergency landing at East Midlands Airport in Leicestershire. There were no ground casualties nor vehicular damage on the motorway as a result of the crash, however 47 passengers on board the aircraft were killed and a further 74 passengers and crew members were seriously injured.
- On 11 June 2003, three military armoured vehicles were thrown across the carriageway near junction 19 near Lutterworth when the transporter carrying them jacknifed; five people were killed.
- An 18-mile (29 km) stretch of the motorway was closed entirely on the morning of 11 December 2005, following a major explosion and fire at the Buncefield Oil Depot which is less than half a mile (800 m) from junction 8 of the M1.
- Part of the motorway close to Tinsley Viaduct was closed to allow safe demolition of the Tinsley cooling towers in the early hours of 24 August 2008. The M1 remained closed for much of the day until the stability of the viaduct was confirmed.
- On 15 April 2011, a 7-mile (11 km) stretch of the road was closed between junctions 1 and 4 due to a fire at a scrapyard underneath the motorway. The road was fully re-opened early on 21 April 2011 with a 50 mph (80 km/h) speed limit in force whilst repair work continued to an elevated section.
- On 26 August 2017, two lorries and a minibus crashed between junctions 14 and 15, near Newport Pagnell, shutting down the motorway for most of the day. Eight people were killed and three severely injured. The drivers of the lorries were charged with dangerous driving, with one also charged with drunk driving. The incident represented the largest loss of life as the result of a motorway accident since a crash on the M40 in 1993.

== Junctions ==
County	Location	mile	km	Jct	Destinations (SB)	Destinations (NB)	Notes
Greater London	London Borough of Barnet	7.0	11.3	1	A406 (North Circular) – Central London, Brent Cross, Wembley		Southern terminus 51.5752°N 0.2347°W
Greater London	London Borough of Barnet	9.1; 9.2	14.6; 14.8	2/3	A1 to A406 clockwise (North Circular) – City of London, Holloway	No access	Southbound exit and northbound entrance 51.6040°N 0.2398°W
Greater London	London Borough of Barnet	12.0	19.3	London Gateway services			51.63513°N 0.2661°W
Greater London	London Borough of Barnet	13.2; 13.5	21.3; 21.8	4	A41 – Harrow, Edgware	No access	Southbound exit and northbound entrance 51.6361°N 0.3047°W
Hertfordshire	Bushey–Radlett boundary	17.1; 17.5	27.5; 28.1	5	A41 – Watford	A41 to M25 anti-clockwise – Aylesbury, Watford	51.6716°N 0.3689°W
Hertfordshire	Watford–Bricket Wood boundary	19.7; 20.0	31.7; 32.2	6	A405 – North Watford	A405 to M25 – St Albans	51.7060°N 0.3818°W
Hertfordshire	St Stephen	20.4; 20.8	32.9; 33.5	6A	M25 to M11 / M20 – Stansted Airport, Dartford M25 to M40 / M4 / M3 – Heathrow Airport	No access	Southbound exit and northbound entrance 51.7183°N 0.3861°W
Hertfordshire	St Michael	22.5; 22.7	36.2; 36.6	7	A414 – St Albans, Hatfield	No access	Southbound exit and northbound entrance 51.7493°N 0.4093°W
Hertfordshire	St Michael	23.5; 23.8	37.8; 38.3	8	A414 – Hemel Hempstead		51.7570°N 0.4164°W
Hertfordshire	Redbourn–Flamstead–Harpenden boundary	27.9; 28.3	44.9; 45.6	9	A5183 – St Albans	A5183 – Redbourn	51.8200°N 0.4171°W
Bedfordshire	Slip End–Luton boundary	30.3; 30.6	48.8; 49.2	10	A1081 – Luton, Luton Airport		51.8540°N 0.4230°W
Bedfordshire	Luton	33.7; 34.0	54.3; 54.7	11	A505 – Luton, Dunstable		51.8935°N 0.4699°W
Bedfordshire	Chalton			11A	A5 to A505 – Aylesbury, Dunstable		51.9216°N 0.4912°W
Bedfordshire	Toddington			Toddington services			51.9478°N 0.5028°W
Bedfordshire	Toddington	38.5; 38.9	62.0; 62.6	12	A5120 – Flitwick		51.9574°N 0.5161°W
Bedfordshire	Husborne Crawley–Brogborough boundary	45.2; 45.4	72.7; 73.1	13	A421 – Bedford, Milton Keynes		52.0266°N 0.6036°W
Buckinghamshire	Broughton–Moulsoe boundary	49.7; 50.2	80.0; 80.8	14	A509 – Milton Keynes, Newport Pagnell		52.0588°N 0.7001°W
Buckinghamshire	Newport Pagnell	53.7	86.5	Newport Pagnell services			52.0833°N 0.7485°W
Northamptonshire	Grange Park	61.8; 62.3	99.4; 100.2	15	A45 / A508 to A43 – Northampton, Wellingborough, Kettering, Rail Freight Terminal		52.1859°N 0.8951°W
Northamptonshire	Rothersthorpe	64.3; 64.9	103.5; 104.5	15A	A43 to M40 – Oxford Northampton services	A43 to M40 – Oxford, Northampton Northampton services	52.2096°N 0.9444°W
Northamptonshire	Upper Heyford	67.9; 68.3	109.2; 109.9	16	A4500 – Northampton	A45 – Daventry	52.2303°N 1.0160°W
Northamptonshire	Watford	75.1	120.8	Watford Gap services			52.3070°N 1.1220°W
Northamptonshire	Watford–Crick boundary	76.6; 76.9	123.3; 123.8	17	No access	M45 – Coventry	Northbound exit and southbound entrance 52.3244°N 1.1407°W
Northamptonshire	Crick	78.5; 78.9	126.3; 126.9	18	A428 to A361 – Daventry, DIRFT	A5 to A428 – Hinckley, Rugby, DIRFT	52.3509°N 1.1546°W
Leicestershire	Swinford (Catthorpe Interchange)	82.3; 82.7	132.4; 133.1	19	A14 – Felixstowe, Kettering	M6 – The North West, Birmingham, Coventry	No access to M6 from southbound exit or to A14 from northbound exit 52.4052°N 1.1770°W
Leicestershire	Lutterworth–Misterton with Walcote boundary	85.5; 86.1	137.6; 138.5	20	A4303 to A426 – Lutterworth, Rugby	A4303 / A4304 – Lutterworth, Market Harborough	52.4502°N 1.1915°W
Leicestershire	Enderby–Lubbesthorpe–Braunstone Town boundary	96.1; 96.6	154.6; 155.4	21	M69 / A5460 – Birmingham, Coventry, Leicester	M69 / A5460 – Coventry, Leicester	52.6004°N 1.1950°W
Leicestershire	Leicester Forest East	97.7	157.2	Leicester Forest East services			52.6192°N 1.2058°W
Leicestershire	Kirby Muxloe	99.3; 99.5	159.8; 160.1	21A	No access	A46 – Leicester, Newark	Northbound exit and southbound entrance 52.6358°N 1.2180°W
Leicestershire	Markfield	104.3; 104.7	167.8; 168.5	22	A50 / A511 – Leicester, Coalville	A511 – Ashby, Coalville	52.6959°N 1.2924°W
Leicestershire	Shepshed	108.8; 109.2	175.1; 175.8	23	A512 – Loughborough, Shepshed		52.7603°N 1.2739°W
Leicestershire	Long Whatton and Diseworth	113.4; 113.6	182.5; 182.8	23A	A42 to M42 – The South West, Birmingham	A453 – East Midlands Airport Donington Park services	No access to A42 from northbound exit and to A453 from southbound exit 52.8193°N 1.3054°W
Leicestershire	Lockington-Hemington	114.9; 115.4	184.9; 185.7	24	A453 – Nottingham, East Midlands Airport Donington Park services	A50 / A453 – Stoke, Derby, Nottingham	52.8440°N 1.2957°W
Leicestershire	Lockington-Hemington	115.8; 116.2	186.3; 187.0	24A	A50 – Stoke, Derby	No access	No exit from northbound traffic (use Junction 24) 52.8580°N 1.3011°W
Derbyshire	Sandiacre	120.0; 120.5	193.2; 193.9	25	A52 – Nottingham, Derby		52.9159°N 1.2997°W
Nottinghamshire	Trowell	124.1	199.8	Trowell services			52.9622°N 1.2673°W
Nottinghamshire	Nuthall	126.0; 126.6	202.8; 203.7	26	A610 – Nottingham	A610 – Nottingham, Ripley	52.9899°N 1.2346°W
Nottinghamshire	Felley–Annesley boundary	131.5; 132.0	211.7; 212.4	27	A608 – Heanor, Hucknall	A608 – Mansfield	53.0634°N 1.2691°W
Derbyshire	Pinxton–South Normanton boundary	135.0; 135.5	217.2; 218.0	28	A38 to A615 – Derby, Matlock	A38 to A615 – Mansfield, Matlock	53.1013°N 1.3240°W
Derbyshire	Tibshelf	138.3	222.5	Tibshelf services			53.1385°N 1.3309°W
Derbyshire	Heath	141.7; 142.3	228.1; 229.0	29	A617 to A632 – Mansfield, Matlock	A617 – Chesterfield	53.1977°N 1.3229°W
Derbyshire	Duckmanton			29A	A6192 to A632 – Markham Vale, Bolsover		53.2465°N 1.3311°W
Derbyshire	Barlborough	148.4; 148.8	238.9; 239.5	30	A616 to A619 – Newark, Chesterfield	A6135 to A619 – Sheffield, Worksop	53.2865°N 1.2960°W
South Yorkshire	Woodall	151.3	243.5	Woodall services			53.3155°N 1.2821°W
South Yorkshire	Aston–Todwick boundary	153.8; 154.2	247.5; 248.2	31	A57 – Worksop	A57 – Sheffield, Rotherham	53.3622°N 1.2835°W
South Yorkshire	Thurcroft–Morthen boundary	156.3; 156.6	251.6; 252.1	32	M18 – The North, Doncaster, Hull	M18 – The North, Doncaster, Hull, Rotherham	53.3916°N 1.2823°W
South Yorkshire	Treeton– Brinsworth boundary	158.8; 159.2	255.6; 256.2	33	A630 – Sheffield, Rotherham		53.3985°N 1.3498°W
South Yorkshire	Sheffield	161.5; 161.7	259.9; 260.3	34	A6109 – Sheffield, Rotherham, Meadowhall	A6178 – Sheffield, Rotherham, Meadowhall	53.4175°N 1.4063°W
South Yorkshire	Sheffield–Thorpe Hesley boundary	164.9; 165.4	265.4; 266.2	35	A629 – Rotherham		53.4558°N 1.4454°W
South Yorkshire	Sheffield–Tankersley boundary	166.7; 166.9	268.2; 268.6	35A	No access	A616 – Manchester	Northbound exit and southbound entrance 53.4753°N 1.4589°W
South Yorkshire	Tankersley–Hoyland–Birdwell boundary	168.0; 168.5	270.3; 271.2	36	A61 – Sheffield, Barnsley	A61 – Barnsley	53.4963°N 1.4755°W
South Yorkshire	Dodworth–Barnsley boundary	172.1; 172.6	276.9; 277.8	37	A628 – Manchester, Barnsley		53.5482°N 1.5157°W
South Yorkshire	Haigh	176.4; 176.9	283.9; 284.7	38	A637 – Huddersfield		53.6030°N 1.5509°W
West Yorkshire	West Bretton–Woolley boundary	178.5	287.2	Woolley Edge services			53.6216°N 1.5482°W
West Yorkshire	Calder Grove–Durkar boundary	179.9; 180.4	289.5; 290.4	39	A636 – Denby Dale	A636 – Wakefield	53.6506°N 1.5287°W
West Yorkshire	Ossett–Wakefield boundary	182.6; 183.0	293.8; 294.5	40	A638 – Wakefield, Dewsbury		53.6836°N 1.5551°W
West Yorkshire	East Ardsley	185.1; 185.6	297.9; 298.7	41	A650 – Wakefield, Morley	A650 – Wakefield	53.7156°N 1.5353°W
West Yorkshire	Lofthouse–Robin Hood–Leeds boundary	186.5; 187.0	300.1; 301.0	42	M62 west – Manchester, Bradford M62 east – Hull, Pontefract	M62 west – Manchester, Bradford, Leeds Bradford Airport M62 east – Hull	53.7309°N 1.5120°W
West Yorkshire	Rothwell–Leeds boundary	188.4; 189.0	303.2; 304.1	43	No access	M621 – Leeds	Northbound exit and southbound entrance 53.7546°N 1.5146°W
West Yorkshire	Rothwell–Leeds boundary	189.4; 189.9	304.8; 305.6	44	A639 to M621 – Leeds	A639 – Leeds	53.7626°N 1.4914°W
West Yorkshire	Leeds	190.8; 191.2	307.1; 307.7	45	A63 – Leeds Skelton Lake services		53.7761°N 1.4704°W
West Yorkshire	Leeds–Garforth boundary	193.7; 194.0	311.7; 312.2	46	A6120 – Leeds	A6120 / A63 – Leeds, Leeds Bradford Airport, Selby	53.7920°N 1.4265°W
West Yorkshire	Garforth	196.6; 197.0	316.4; 317.1	47	A656 / A642 – Castleford, Garforth	A642 to A1(M) – Garforth, The South	53.8056°N 1.3615°W
West Yorkshire	Micklefield–Lotherton cum Aberford boundary	197.7	318.1	48	A1(M) – The North, Wetherby		Northern terminus 53.8218°N 1.3387°W
Notes: Data from driver location signs/distance marker posts are used to provide distance and carriageway identification information. Where a junction spans several hundred metres and the data is available, both the start and finish values for the junction are shown. Coordinate data from ACME Mapper.
1.000 mi = 1.609 km; 1.000 km = 0.621 mi Incomplete access

== See also ==
- List of motorways in the United Kingdom
