= Northamptonshire Music and Performing Arts Trust =

Coordinates: 52.2442°N 0.8841°W

Northamptonshire Music and Performing Arts Trust is a music and performing arts service in Northamptonshire, England, which provides instrumental music lessons in local schools. Its services are available to around 13,000 school children. In July 2009 the music service was given an Outstanding level through MSEP evaluation. The service supports fifteen Saturday morning music centres and many music and drama groups, all within Northamptonshire. Membership of the county level groups is determined by an annual audition process each July. For most groups there are three levels: Junior, Training and Youth which are usually abbreviated by staff and students, e.g. County Junior Wind Orchestra (CJWO), County Training Strings (CTS) and County Youth Orchestra (CYO).

There are groups covering ensemble, orchestral, brass band, wind band, jazz, rock, guitar, percussion, voice, drama, dance and early years music.

In April 2012 the service became an independent, charitable trust and in May 2012 it was designated as the government's music and education hub for the area.

== Location ==
The music service headquarters is in Northampton in a Victorian school building on the corner of Clare Street and the Kettering Road that used to be known as John Clare School.

== Performances and events ==
Groups from the music service perform at the Derngate, Spinney Hill Theatre, Cripps Hall, the Lighthouse Theatre and other venues throughout the year.

Each year, there are residential courses for students in Junior and Training Groups around October, as well as "Play & Stay" courses for students between years 3 and 6 in February. These used to occur at Grendon Hall, however have since been relocated to the Rock UK Frontier Centre since 2019. Students in CYO, the County Youth Concert Band (CYCB) and the County Youth Brass Band (CYBB) go on tours to a foreign country in alternate years. From 2016, the County Youth Choir (CYCh) have also toured. The CYO and CYCh tour jointly one year, and the CYBB and CYCB the following year. For example in July 2014, the CYO went to Germany, and in July 2015, the CYCB and CYBB went to the Czech Republic and Slovakia, including a performance at Kroměříž Castle.

The music groups and groups from the Saturday morning centres take part in the National Festival of Music for Youth and the service is often represented at the Schools Proms at the Royal Albert Hall in November. In 2012 both the County Youth Concert Band and the County Youth Orchestra featured at the Schools Proms.

In 2017, the Trust was invited to the Music for Youth Proms, to form part of a massed ensemble in conjunction with Rutland Music and the Peterborough Music Hub at the Royal Albert Hall. The piece, titled Nene, was composed by Benjamin Till, an alumnus of the Trust. The piece charts the course of the River Nene as it flows from Badby to the sea, and featured the CYO, CYCh, and CYBB, along with several primary schools in the region, and an interactive water feature. A longer version of the piece was performed at Peterborough Cathedral and the Derngate.

The county is also regularly represented at the National Concert Band Festival and the National Youth Brass Band Championships, with the CYCB regularly attaining the Platinum level award.

== Trust status ==
In April 2012 the service completed procedures to become an independent, charitable trust in a move encouraged and supported by the local council. In May 2012 the trust was announced as the lead partner in the Northamptonshire Music Education Hub as part of the government's National Plan for Music Education.

== Saturday Morning Music and Performing Arts Centres ==
These are located in the following areas:

- Brackley
- Cheney
- Corby
- Daventry
- Duston
- Favell
- Ferrers
- Guilsborough
- Kettering
- Oundle
- Roade
- Towcester
- Spinney Hill
- Wellingborough

== Alumni ==
- James Fountain - Principal Trumpet of the Royal Philharmonic Orchestra
- Sarah Hanson - Associate Principal Viola for Dundee Symphony Orchestra
- Benjamin Till - Composer, director and film maker
