= Great Oakley, Northamptonshire =

Suburb of Corby, England

Coordinates: 52.4627°N 0.7191°W

Great Oakley
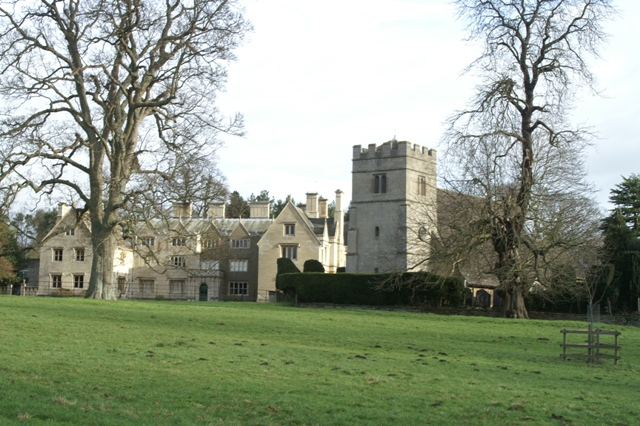
- Great Oakley Hall and St Michael's Church

- Location within Northamptonshire
- Population: 2,248 (Ward. 2011)
- OS grid reference: SP871857
- Civil parish: Corby
- Unitary authority: North Northamptonshire
- Ceremonial county: Northamptonshire
- Region: East Midlands
- Country: England
- Sovereign state: United Kingdom
- Post town: Corby
- Postcode district: NN18
- Dialling code: 01536
- Police: Northamptonshire
- Fire: Northamptonshire
- Ambulance: East Midlands
- UK Parliament: Corby and East Northamptonshire

Great Oakley is an outer suburb of Corby, in the civil parish of Corby, in the North Northamptonshire district, in the ceremonial county of Northamptonshire, England. It is situated approximately two miles south west of the town centre and five miles from Kettering. It was represented on Corby Borough Council by one councillor. The population of the Great Oakley Ward of Corby Borough Council at the 2011 Census was 2,248.

Great (and Little) Oakley lie in the upper reaches of the Harpers Brook on a narrow strip of limestone, sandstone and clay where the valley has cut down through the extensive boulder clay capped plateau. This permeable geology presumably provided a narrow strip of open pasture, the oak ley, along the valley within a broad tract of woodland on the boulder clay either side. The townships extended across the boulder clay to tributaries of the Harpers Brook on the south and of the Willow Brook on the north west, where it abutted extensive woodland which lay in the forest.

== History ==
The name 'Oakley' means 'oak-tree wood/clearing'.

In 1086 there was one manor of Great Oakley held by Launcelin and in the 12th century this was held of the Honour of Huntingdon by de Houton. During the medieval period the main manor can be traced via various families, including the de Lyons in the 14th century. The manor was later divided but brought back together after 1495 by the Brooke family and much of Great Oakley has been in the ownership of the Brooke family, including the De Capell Brooke baronets, since then. The present lord of the manor is Alexander de Capell Brooke, who lives with his family in Great Oakley Hall, which was extensively renovated in the 1960s.

The earliest enclosure recorded in Oakley is in 1505-6 when the Abbot of Pipewell enclosed 26 acres called Oldfald field and expelled five people.

In 1647 a dispute occurred with William Brighunt, keeper of the forest, for trespass by Thomas Brooke by taking conies from the common at Snatchall and collecting tithe wool from lambs that Brighunt had there. Thomas also took wood for his own use during 1625-1695. At the enclosure of the Rockingham Bailiwick in 1833, Great Oakley was considered to be part of Rockingham Forest.

The South Fields were enclosed privately in 1786. A notebook contains great detail of the items to consider and ‘errors to avoid’; it lists the number of yardlands and beast commons, describes fencing and other costs, discussed what the tenants required, took advice from nearby parishes that had been recently enclosed (e. g. Brixworth), as well as giving retrospective information about cropping in the old enclosures and noting that conditions of tenancy had been to supply coal to the Hall.

In 1931 the parish had a population of 189. On 1 April 1935 the parish was abolished to form Oakley, On 1 April 1967 Great Oakley became part of Corby when Oakley was abolished.

== Present day ==
The present day village is bisected by Great Oakley Park which surrounds the hall. The greater part of the village lies to the north, with Woodlands Lane (forming the rest of the village) to the south. In the centre of the village is the village hall. This was erected in 1921 by Sir Arthur R. de Capell Brooke for the villagers to use for social activities. Next to the hall is the old vicarage, in the grounds of which there is a large grass mound. Rumour has it that a vicar once had this made so that he could feel nearer to Heaven! The original village hall has now been replaced by a new hall adjacent to the cricket club off Lewin Road, behind Lovap Way.

In the grounds of the Hall is St Michael's Church, Great Oakley, which was built of stone in the 13th century. The nave roof is built of Collyweston stone slate. Both the nave and the small tower, which houses three bells, were added to the church in the 16th and 17th centuries. The church register dates from 1718. Inside the church there are several monuments to the Brooke family, and the oak choir stalls are said to have come from the Cistercian abbey at Pipewell. The church is a grade II* listed building.

Harpers Brook flows through the village and this stream was once the boundary of Rockingham Forest. There is a well in the village called Monk's Well. This was mentioned in the Domesday Book, and at one time the villagers used it as their water supply. It can still be seen, and is situated in the grounds of Bridge Farm in Brooke Road.

The old school building remains opposite the old vicarage and the wall-mounted post box in Woodlands Lane may denote the old post office but there is no sign of the former public house or baker's shop.

Although in recent years extensive new housing has been built on land heading towards Corby, much of Great Oakley remains unchanged. A preservation order exists on all trees and stone houses in the village, and this will help to ensure that the character of Great Oakley remains for future generations.
