= Brockhall =

Brockhall may refer to:

- Brockhall Village, Lancashire, England, home to the training ground of Blackburn Rovers FC
- Brockhall, Northamptonshire, England, a village
