= Pipewell =

Village in Northamptonshire, England

Coordinates: 52.4636°N 0.7659°W

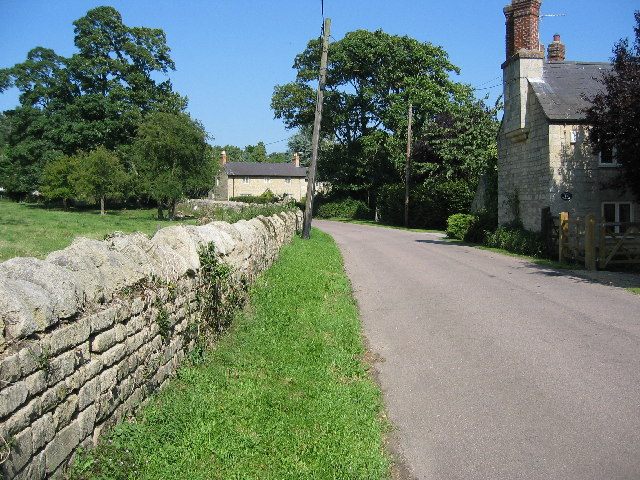

- Location within Northamptonshire
- Population: 67 (2001)
- OS grid reference: SP839857
- Civil parish: Rushton
- Unitary authority: North Northamptonshire
- Ceremonial county: Northamptonshire
- Region: East Midlands
- Country: England
- Sovereign state: United Kingdom
- Post town: Kettering
- Postcode district: NN14
- Dialling code: 01536
- Police: Northamptonshire
- Fire: Northamptonshire
- Ambulance: East Midlands
- UK Parliament: Kettering

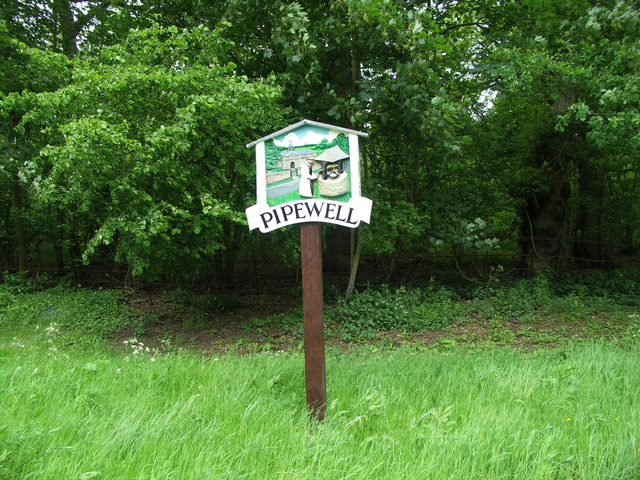
Village sign

Pipewell is a village in the civil parish of Rushton, in the North Northamptonshire district, in the ceremonial county of Northamptonshire, England. It is a mile away from Corby. With 63 inhabitants, it is one of the smallest villages in Northamptonshire. A Community Governance Review concluded in February 2015 resulted in the ward of Pipewell being moved from civil parish of Wilbarston to Rushton.

In the twelfth century Richard I held his Midland Parliaments in Pipewell.

Pipewell was the site of Pipewell Abbey, a Cistercian abbey, established in 1143 by William Butevilain as a daughter house of Newminster Abbey. All of the settlement is built around three fields where this used to be, which contains the Harpers Brook, a tributary of the River Nene, running through the centre. It was located within the old Rockingham Forest and some of its income came from sale of the timber and undergrowth.

The abbey was suppressed as part of the dissolution of the monasteries in November 1538, despite the representations of local gentleman, especially Sir William Parr (later Marquess of Northampton). The site was subsequently granted to Parr. He intended to demolish the house, but before he could do so the property was looted by the locals. Demolition took place soon after and by 1720 no standing masonry was visible.

Pipewell Hall, a Grade II mansion, was built in 1675 with some of the stone from the former abbey: the abbey remains are contained in its estate. West of the site, there is a mill pond and dam, together with a series of medieval quarries which have been worked into the twentieth century.

Pipewell also holds Northamptonshire's smallest church building, known as the Abbey Church of St Mary which was built in 1881.
