= Spinney Hills (disambiguation) =

Spinney Hills is a place in Leicester, England.

Spinney Hills may also refer to:

- Spinney Hills, East Quogue, a place in New York

== See also ==
- Spinney Hill, an affluent area of Northampton
