= Benjamin Till =

English composer, director and film maker (born 1974)

Benjamin Till (born 8 August 1974) is an English composer, director and film maker.

== Early years ==
Till was born in Oswestry, Shropshire, and spent much of his childhood in the Northamptonshire town of Higham Ferrers. He attended the Northamptonshire Music and Performing Arts Trust (NMPAT) and sang in the Northamptonshire County Youth Choir.

== Education ==
He studied music and composition at The University of York, then trained on the directing course at London's Mountview Theatre School.

== Composing ==
=== Mosaic Voices ===
Till is the Composer in Residence for Mosaic Voices, a British vocal ensemble specialising in music from the Jewish tradition based at New West End Synagogue in Bayswater, London. He also sings as baritone in the ensemble. Mosaic Voices' most recent album, Letter To Kamilla (released by Chandos Records), was a top 5 album in the official UK Classical Music charts and was described by Gramophone magazine as "moving but never mawkish" and by BBC Music Magazine as "sung with power and passion... simply heartbreaking."

Till has written over fifty original compositions for the ensemble, and arranged or re-scored more than one hundred further pieces. His composition, "Time", was performed in January 2024. It tells the story of the New West End Synagogue through newspaper reports, mostly from The Jewish Chronicle. His setting of Psalm 23 ("The Lord's My Shepherd") was turned into a short film which documented the lives of Jewish people in the UK during lockdown. This film won a Sandford St Martin Trustees Award.

=== Nene ===
In 2016, Till was commissioned by NMPAT (Northamptonshire Music and Performing Arts Trust) to compose a major orchestral and choral work about the River Nene, which flows through his childhood home town of Higham Ferrers. The composition was scored for 800 musicians and premiered at the Royal Albert Hall in 2017, before being performed at Northampton's Derngate Theatre and Peterborough Cathedral. His composition follows the river from its source in Badby to the sea (100 miles away) in Norfolk. The piece quotes tradition folk melodies from towns and villages along the river, and explores ghost stories, myths and legends associated with the Nene. Till also musicalises the sounds of the river and its associated wildlife, including the calls of red kites.

=== The Pepys Motet ===
In 2010, St. Olave's Church in London, where Samuel Pepys is buried, commissioned Till to write a 40-part motet to mark the 350th anniversary of Pepys beginning to write his diary. Four of the six movements were performed live in November 2010 at St. Olave's. The fourth movement, The Great Fire, was broadcast on BBC Radio 3's In Tune programme, whilst The Pepys Motet was re-scored for 20 voices, being recorded and released by Hind Style Records in 2016.

=== The London Requiem ===
Completed in 2012, The London Requiem is a setting of gravestone inscriptions which Till found in cemeteries across London. This ten-movement work is scored for string orchestra, string quartet, four percussionists and three keyboard players, alongside full SATB choir and soloists. The work was featured on The Space, a pilot BBC project. Ten short films were created for each of the movements, and, subsequently, a live performance of the full piece was broadcast from Abney Park Cemetery. The London Requiem was recorded in 2012; it featured the Balanescu Quartet and soloists including Maddy Prior, Matt Lucas, Tanita Tikaram and Barbara Windsor.

=== "Oranges and Lemons" ===
In early 2009, Till recorded all the bells mentioned in the nursery rhyme, "Oranges and Lemons" (two hundred bells in seventeen London churches), and wrote a piece of music to feature them all playing in harmony, alongside a choir of people who live or work in one of the areas around the churches. This twelve-minute composition, which included 4000 individual bell strikes was featured on BBC Radio 3's In Tune and BBC Radio 4's Today programme, alongside in depth coverage by BBC London, who sponsored the piece with Arts Council England. It received its premiere performance on 11 July 2009 at the Church of St. Mary le Bow in London.

Till's various compositions also include some liturgical Jewish works for a cappella male vocal ensemble, commissioned by Mosaic Voices, the resident choir at the New West End Synagogue, of which he is a member.

== Theatre work ==
=== Brass ===
In 2014, Till was commissioned by the National Youth Music Theatre to create a new musical to commemorate the centenary of the First World War. Brass had book, music and lyrics by Till, with additional lyrics by Arnold Wesker and Nathan Taylor. The show premiered in August 2014 at Leeds City Varieties music hall, and tells the story of a group of men from a Leeds-based brass band who sign up to fight as part of the Leeds Pals battalion, and the women who decide to learn the instruments the men have left behind, in the hope of playing triumphantly for them on their return from war.

The show, directed by Sara Kestelman and choreographed by Matt Flint, went on to win Best Musical at the UK Theatre Awards 2014. A cast recording was released the following year. Brass was later revived by the NYMT in a new production at the Hackney Empire in August 2016, directed by Hannah Chissick, and was well-received. Theatre critic and associate editor of The Stage Mark Shenton said the show was a "magnificent miracle of a musical [...] with epic sweep and originality."

From 31 October to 24 November 2018, the show received its professional premiere in a new production at the Union Theatre in Southwark, directed by Sasha Regan, the theatre's founder and artistic director. The production received four and five-star reviews. Michael Arditti in the Sunday Express wrote "Benjamin Till's rich, melodious score, its influences, ranging from Marie Lloyd to Vaughan Williams, powerfully conveys the fervour, horror and heartbreak both in the trenches and at home". The production was nominated for five Offies.

=== Em ===
In 2017, Till wrote the musical Em, set in Liverpool in 1965, which tells the story of a woman who is trying to keep a baby born out of wedlock, who the authorities want to take away from her. The musical was performed by Central School of Speech and Drama, and subsequently released as a cast album.

=== Other theatre ===
- Alice Through the Looking-Glass (Fox Theatre, Palmers Green, 1996 and Blewbury Theatre, Oxfordshire, 2002 – director, adaptor and composer)
- Someone Whistled (Pleasance Theatre, May 1997 – composer, director)
- An Evening of Opera Excerpts (Royal Theatre, Northampton, August 1997 – director)
- Madam Butterfly (Royal Albert Hall and tour, 1998 and 2000 – assistant director)
- Aida (Royal Albert Hall and NIA, January–March 2001 – assistant director)
- A Christmas Carol (Royal Festival Hall, December 2001 – assistant director)
- Taboo (West End, 2001–2003 – resident director)
- Verdi's Macbeth (Royal Opera House, Covent Garden, 2002 – assistant director)
- Little Lil (Hen and Chickens Theatre, May 2003 – director)
- Little By Little (Arts Theatre, London, July 2004 – director)
- Brass (Bernie Grant Theatre, November 2018 - director)

In 1997, Till was approached by playwright Arnold Wesker to collaborate with him on a one-woman musical play that he had written in 1990. The piece was called Letter to a Daughter, and the UK premiere opened at the Assembly Rooms in Edinburgh on Till's birthday, 8 August 1998.

== Film and television ==
=== Casting ===
From 2004 to 2006, Till worked as a casting assistant to casting director Shaheen Baig, and worked on such films as Control, Notes on a Scandal, Brick Lane and 28 Weeks Later, the latter of which he also worked on closely with the two young leads, Imogen Poots and Mackintosh Muggleton.

=== BBC films ===
In early 2005, Till submitted a pitch to BBC London News, who were looking for people to make a two-minute short film on the subject of "Untold London." The pitch was for a musical film featuring the different communities who use and enjoy Hampstead Heath. Till was one of ten directors chosen to make their films, and Hampstead Heath: The Musical was born. The film was nominated for a Royal Television Society award.

BBC producer Penny Wrout then commissioned him to make a three-minute musical film for the Children in Need telethon, showcasing the unusual ways that people were raising money for the popular charity; the film was shown twice during the telethon in November that year.

=== The Busker Symphony (2006) ===
In 2006, Till made four short films for Channel 4's Three-Minute Wonder season. The project was called The Busker Symphony, and a four-movement piece he composed was performed by buskers past and present at various locations around London. Each film featured one movement from the Symphony, variously entitled Andante, Adagio, Scherzo and Finalé; the films were broadcast in April 2006.

=== A1: the Road Musical (2008) ===
In April 2008, Till started work on his largest-scale project to date, A1: the Road Musical, again for Channel 4. The half-hour film was produced by Endemol, and followed a lorry driver's journey up the A1 from London to Edinburgh during which he met various people along the way, who all tell their stories, either in song or set to a specially composed soundtrack.

The film starts with Londoners singing their thoughts while stuck in city traffic, then further up the road a young Polish man is introduced: he is deliberating whether or not to leave England and return to Poland. We then meet a woman who was involved in a severe car accident and the mysterious stranger who helped her, a choir of ex-miners lamenting the demise of the coal industry, a young man who lost his brother in an accident on the A1, two motorbikers railing at the government red tape that threatens to stifle people's independence, and a Berwick-upon-Tweed resident who is campaigning to have the Scottish border redrawn to make his town part of Scotland, where he feels it rightly belongs.

The film was broadcast on 29 August 2008, and became the fourth most-praised programme aired on Channel 4 that month, based on telephone calls to the station to congratulate the makers.

=== Coventry Market: the Musical (2008) ===
On 4 November 2008, BBC CWR (Coventry & Warwickshire Radio) screened the premiere of Coventry Market: the Musical, a film made by Till to celebrate the 50th anniversary of the town's indoor market. Drawing on the whole community surrounding the market, and those who work in it or patronise it, the film spawned a large multi-platform project, with many radio hours dedicated to its creation, and the stories of some of those featured in it. In addition, there were associated online blogs and news documentaries shown in the region.

=== Metro: the Musical (2011) ===
On 24 March 2011, BBC Look North premiered Till's Metro: the Musical. The work celebrated 30 years of the Tyne and Wear Metro carrying the local community from the busy city centre in Monument to the coast of Tynemouth, or Newcastle Airport. It featured a cast of 180 – all of whom have worked or been passengers on the network since 1980 – sharing their stories.

=== Our Gay Wedding: the Musical (2014) ===
On 29 March 2014, Till married his long-term partner Nathan Taylor, in the process becoming one of the first same-sex couples to get married in the UK. They were married in a musical, commissioned by Channel 4, in Alexandra Palace Theatre, which was broadcast two days after the wedding. The multi-award-winning film received wide praise. Ed Power, writing in The Daily Telegraph, said it was "more powerful than anything all the romcom writers in the world could have put together".

The Guardian's Tim Dowling wrote "When I say I cried I cried all the way through [...] an hour of unbridled joy, an inventive and wholly appropriate way to celebrate the advent of equal marriage [...] better than perfect, it was fabulous." In Metro, Simon Swift reviewed it as "The wedding that was better than Kate and Will's [...] a heartwarming, uplifting, tear-jerking celebration of gay marriage [...] Best. Wedding. Ever."

=== 100 Faces (2018) ===
In 2018, Till made the film 100 Faces, which features 100 Jewish British people, one born every year between 1918 and 2017. Some participants sing, some speak, and all state what being Jewish means to them in a single sentence. The film is accompanied by a soundtrack recorded by the Israel Camerata orchestra. It was premiered at the UK Jewish Film Festival in 2018, and has subsequently been screened in festivals around the world. In 2019, it shared the gold prize at the prestigious Robinson Short Film Awards.

== Awards ==
| Year | Association | Category | Work | Result |
|---|---|---|---|---|
| 2009 | Grierson Awards | Best Newcomer | A1: The Road Musical | Nominated |
| 2009 | Sony Awards | The Community Award | Coventry Market: the Musical | Nominated |
| 2011 | Prix de Circom | Social Interaction and Viewer Support | A Symphony for Yorkshire | Won |
| 2011 | RTS Awards | Team of the Year | A Symphony for Yorkshire | Won |
| 2011 | RTS Awards | Music | A Symphony for Yorkshire | Won |
| 2011 | RTS Awards | Community | A Symphony for Yorkshire | Won |
| 2011 | RTS Awards | Social Media | A Symphony for Yorkshire | Nominated |
| 2011 | RTS Awards | Drama or Entertainment | A Symphony for Yorkshire | Nominated |
| 2014 | UK Theatre Awards | Best Musical Production | Brass | Won |
| 2014 | Prix Italia | TV Performing Arts | Our Gay Wedding: the Musical | Won |
| 2014 | Broadcast Award | Best Music Programme | Our Gay Wedding: the Musical | Nominated |
| 2014 | Grierson Awards | Best Entertaining Documentary | Our Gay Wedding: the Musical | Won |
| 2014 | Guardian TV Award | TV Moment of the Year | Our Gay Wedding: the Musical | Nominated |
| 2014 | Guardian TV Award | Most Innovative TV Programme | Our Gay Wedding: the Musical | Nominated |
| 2015 | BAFTA | Best Special Factual | Our Gay Wedding: The Musical | Nominated |
| 2015 | Rose D'Or | Best Arts Programme | Our Gay Wedding: the Musical | Won |
| 2015 | RTS Award | Best Arts | Our Gay Wedding: the Musical | Nominated |
| 2016 | West End Wilma Award | Most Underrated West End Show | Beyond the Fence | Nominated |
| 2019 | Robinson International Short Film Competition Gold Prize | Best Short Film | 100 Faces | Won |
| 2021 | Sandford St Martin Award | Trustees Community Award | Psalm 23 (Mizmor L'David) | Won |

== Radio ==
Till worked with his friend Arnold Wesker again in 2007, when he was asked to write the featured song (to Wesker's lyrics) and incidental music for Wesker's radio play The Rocking Horse, commissioned by the BBC World Service to celebrate theirs and Wesker's 75th birthday. The play was aired in November 2007.

== Personal life ==
Benjamin Till is married to actor and knitting guru Nathan Taylor.
