= Port of Wisbech =

Inland port in Cambridgeshire, England

Coordinates: 52°40′19″N 0°09′26″E

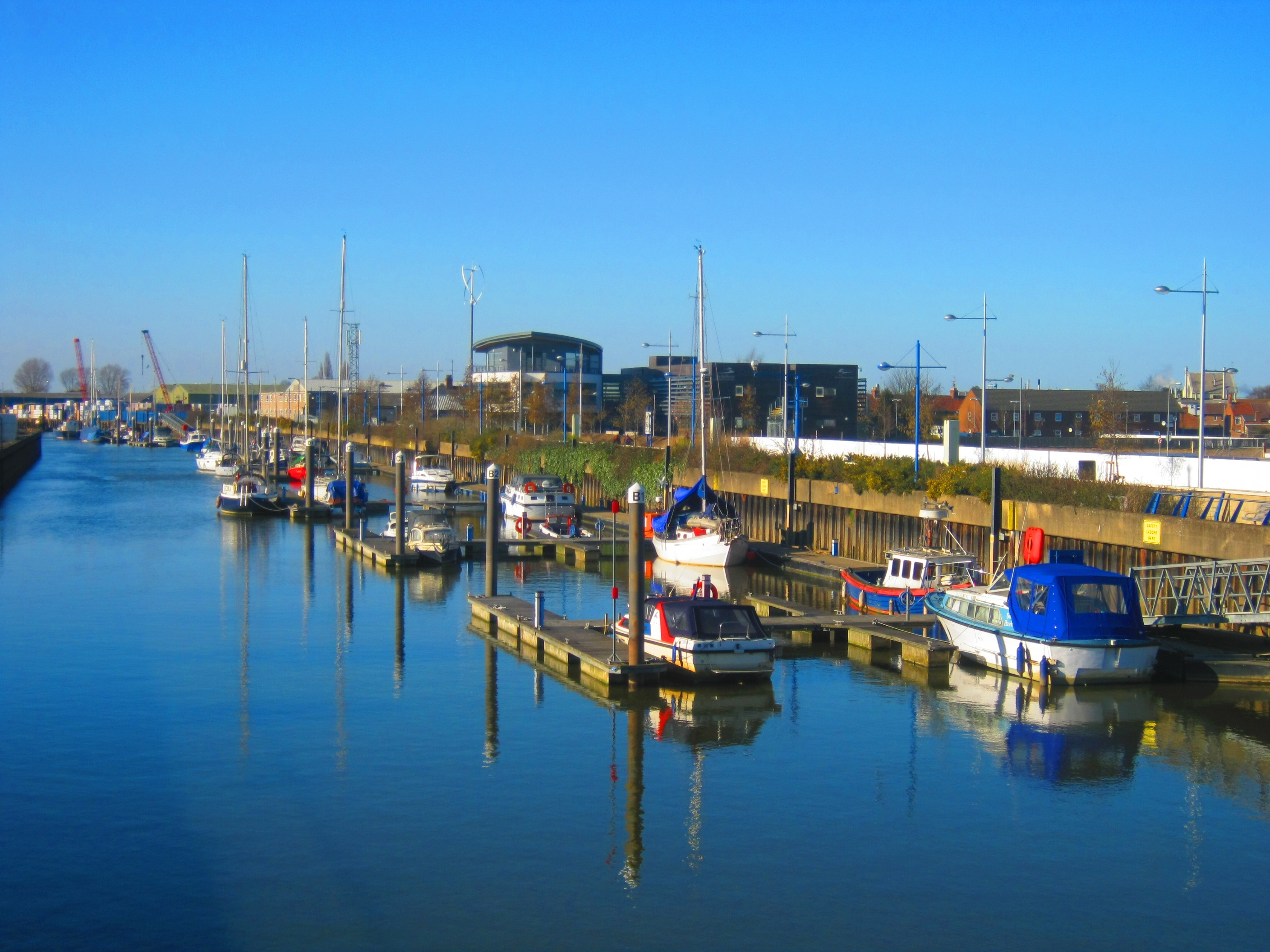
Yachtclub with cargo depot in the background.

Port of Wisbech is an inland port on the River Nene in Wisbech, Isle of Ely, Cambridgeshire, United Kingdom. It is mainly used for cargo and industrial purposes, with the southern part of the port housing a number of berths for yachts. Fenland District Council is the harbour authority for most of the River Nene; as well as operating the port and harbour, it provides a Port Health service to commercial ships, leisure craft and fishing vessels. The port runs a fortnightly service from Riga, Latvia, importing from the Baltic.

== History ==
Wisbech was an Anglo-Saxon port on The Wash and continued to serve as a port in medieval times. After the estuary of the River Ouse became silted up, it was diverted into the sea at King's Lynn. This led to the construction of the present course of the River Nene from Peterborough to the Wash. The drained marshes provided rich productive farmland, bringing prosperity to the port of Wisbech from the regular shipments of corn and oil seed rape to the coast and continent, and imports which included coal from the North, slate from Wales and timber from the Baltic. Woad (Isatis tinctoria) was shipped out from the port. At its peak over 200 vessels were registered to the port.

== Operations ==
The Port of Wisbech can handle ships up to 260 by 40 feet (79 by 12 m) long and with a draught of 17 feet (5.2 m). It also caters for smaller boats, with a major expansion of the facilities at the yacht harbour completed in May 2000.

Approx annual tonnage: 800,000.

Connections to major transport links: A17, A47 east coast to A1/M1 carriageway.

The port runs a fortnightly service from Riga, Latvia, importing from the Baltic.

== See also ==
- Port Sutton Bridge

== Bibliography ==
- Smith, Iain (2006). The River Nene. Imray Laurie Norie and Wilson. ISBN 978-0-85288-944-2.
