= Brockhall, Northamptonshire =

Village in Northamptonshire, England

Coordinates: 52.2570°N 1.0711°W

Brockhall
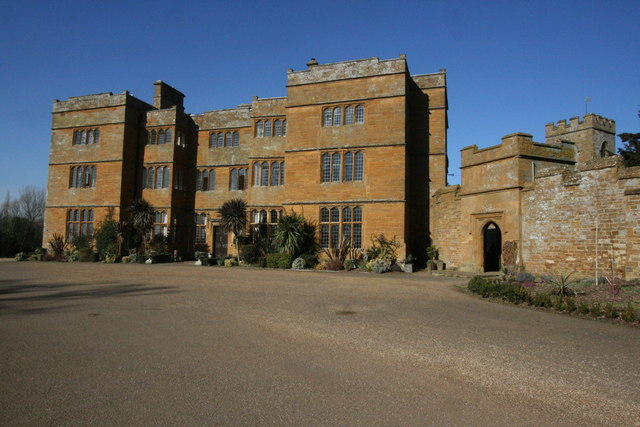
- Brockhall Hall

- Location within Northamptonshire
- OS grid reference: SP6362
- Unitary authority: West Northamptonshire
- Ceremonial county: Northamptonshire
- Region: East Midlands
- Country: England
- Sovereign state: United Kingdom
- Post town: Northampton
- Postcode district: NN7
- Dialling code: 01327
- Police: Northamptonshire
- Fire: Northamptonshire
- Ambulance: East Midlands
- UK Parliament: Daventry

Brockhall is a civil parish and village in West Northamptonshire in England. Brockhall, like many estate villages, is a small settlement that has developed around its eponymous hall. The village - Brocole in Old English - was recorded in the Domesday Book. Brocole means "Badger hole". The name is derived from "broc" ("badger" in Old English) and "hol" ("hollow" in Old English). The population is included in the civil parish of Norton.

The parish church, St Peter & St Paul, is part of the Benefice of Heyford with Stowe IX Churches and Flore with Brockhall.

== Notable buildings ==
Brockhall Hall was originally built by Edward Eyton. In 1625, Eyton sold the house to Thomas Thornton of Newnham. Thornton was a lawyer and also the Recorder of Daventry. In 1634 Thomas Thornton bought Newnham manor from the Knightleys of Fawsley who had held it jointly with Badby manor since 1542. Mr Thornton supported Oliver Cromwell and was later pardoned by King Charles II.

Since the Civil War, five Thorntons have held the position of High Sheriff of Northamptonshire. The first was John Thornton who assumed the post in 1672; the last was Colonel Thornton who held the position in 1946.

During World War II, the hall and its grounds were used by the American Office of Strategic Studies, an early predecessor of the CIA. Saboteurs were airlifted to Europe from nearby Harrington airfield where the Carpetbagger Museum commemorates their contributions to the war effort.

The Thornton family lived at Brockhall Hall until 1969 when it was sold to Peter Lee after the death of the last male heir. Brockhall Hall is now divided up into a number of residential flats.

A descendant of the original owner, Thomas Reeve Thornton (d. 1862), married Susannah Fremeaux, the heiress of her grandfather James Fremeaux of Kingsthorpe (d. 1799). Fremeaux was a Huguenot merchant who had been naturalised as a British citizen in 1752 and had through marriage acquired the Cooke estate at Kingsthorpe in 1762. The Thorntons remained at Brockhall until 1969. In 1978, upon the death of Col. Thomas Anson Thornton, the male line became extinct.

The house is reputed to be haunted by a white lady - this might be an owner's wife who committed suicide in the 1780s.

St Peter and St Paul church is c.1200. The chancel was rebuilt in 1874 by Edmund Francis Law. The church has several monuments to the Thorntons.

The Manor House is dated 1617.
