= Newnham Hill =

Coordinates: 52.24328°N 1.15782°W

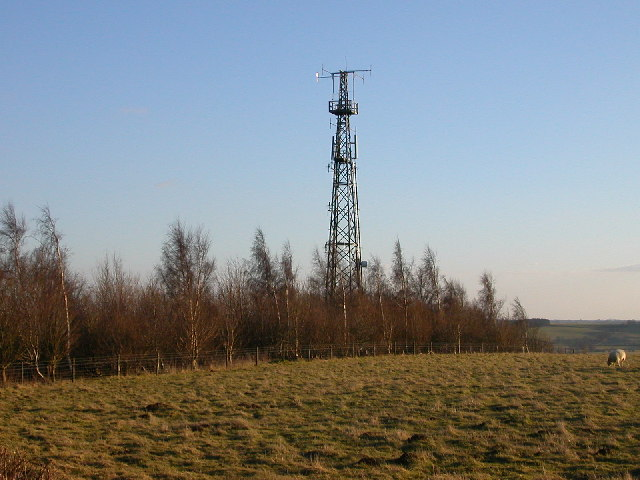
- The Air Traffic Control Mast on Newnham Hill

Highest point
- Elevation: 201 m (659 ft)

Geography
- Location: Northamptonshire, England
- OS grid: SP576609
- Topo map: OS Explorer 222

Geology
- Mountain type: Prominent hill

Newnham Hill is a prominent hill south of the town of Daventry in the English county of Northamptonshire .

== The Summit ==
Newnham Hill is 201 meters above sea level. The summit can be reached by taking the lane which links Daventry to the village of Newnham on the southern side of the hill.

On the summit of Newnham Hill near the edge of Beggars Bank there stands a tower windmill. It is believed that a windmill has stood at this location as far back as 1661, when it was first recorded in an inventory of the then miller, John Bignell. The current building dates back to the early 19th century and was three floors high. The building was in a state of disrepair until the 1980s when a group was formed to repair and reconstruct the damaged building. Keys can be obtained to view the windmill by appointment through Daventry Tourist Information Centre.

A little way to the south of the windmill there is also an Air Traffic Control Mast which is an important part of the air traffic control system of the United Kingdom.
