= Badby Wood =

Nature reserve in Northamptonshire, England

Coordinates: 52.22°N 1.177°W

- Site of Special Scientific Interest
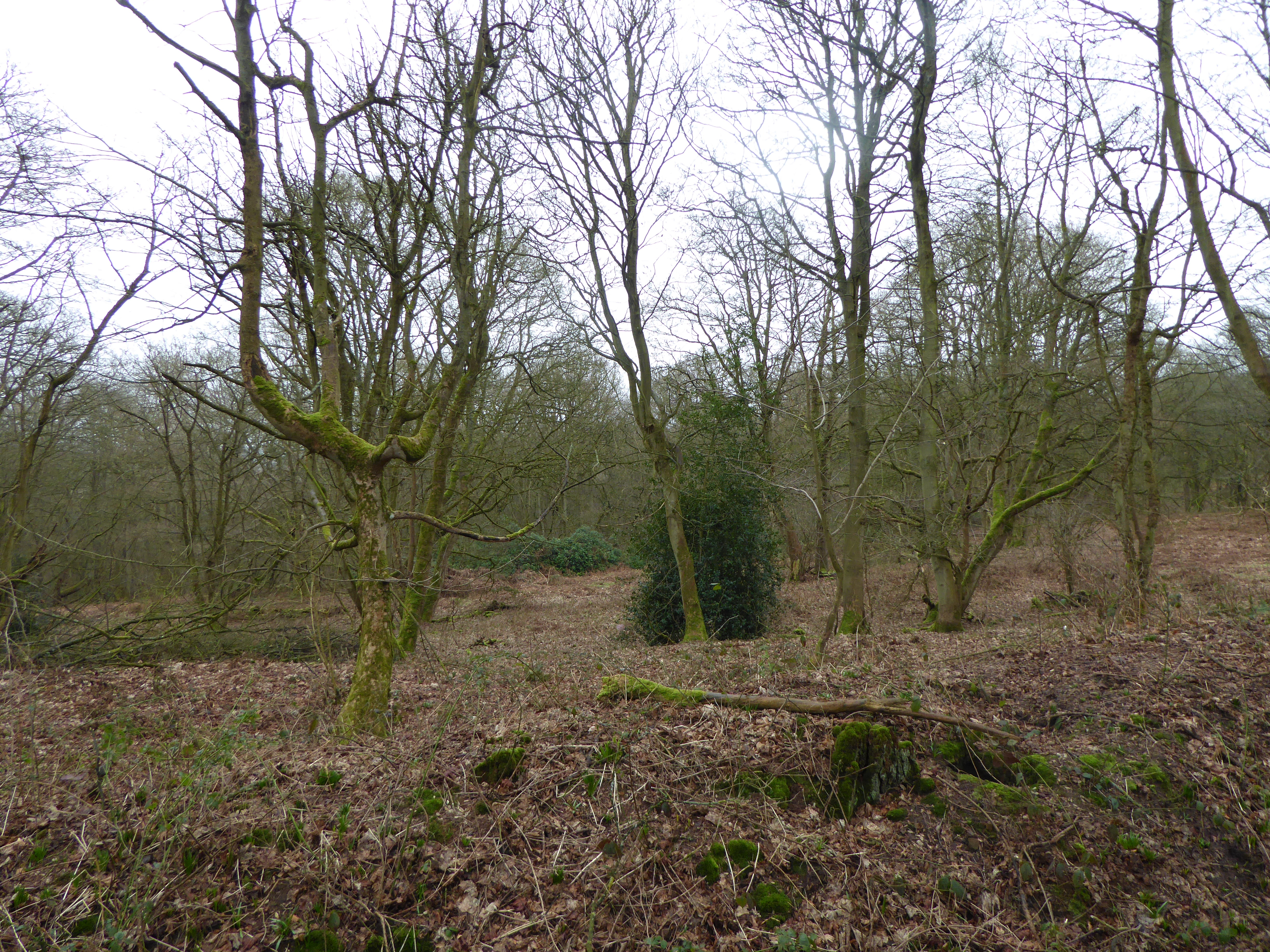
- Location of Badby Wood.
- Area of search: Northamptonshire
- Grid reference: SP 563 582
- Interest: Biological
- Area: 47.2 hectares
- Notification date: 1985
- Location map: Magic Map

Badby Wood is a 47.2-hectare (117-acre) biological Site of Special Scientific Interest (SSSI) south of Badby in Northamptonshire.

This is ancient semi-natural woodland on acidic soils, and it has been forested for over 700 years. It is mainly pedunculate oak, with varied ground flora including creeping soft-grass, wood anemone, yellow archangel and bluebell. A small marsh has very diverse herbs.

There is access by footpaths from Badby. Much of the eastern half of the wood falls outside the SSSI.
