= Wootton Brook =

Watercourse in Northamptonshire, England

Coordinates: 52.2234°N 0.9422°W

Wootton Brook is a tributary of the River Nene which runs through Northamptonshire, England.

== Course ==
The brook has two sources, one rises at Salcey Lawn in the middle of Salcey Forest and flows northerly, the other rises at Yardley Chase and flows in a southerly direction, both converging in a marshy field southeast of Horton.

It then takes a westerly direction, passing under the B526 (Northampton – Newport Pagnell road, once the A50 trunk road), and takes a meandering course between Hackleton on its north bank and Piddington on its south bank, continuing through Preston Deanery. It runs on between Wootton (northbank) – the village that gives it its name – and Grange Park (southbank) passing under the Quinton Road and continuing on to pass under the A45, into Blackymoor.

Here it is used to provide man-made lakes for Collingtree golf course and balancing lakes to take the runoff from East Hunsbury.

It then passes under the Northampton – Euston railway line and the old Northampton – Towcester Road (long since bypassed by the A43 dual carriageway), at Ladybridge Park, which takes its name from the 19th-century name of the brook, Lady Brook, with the Counties Crematorium on its south bank. Passing now to the south of West Hunsbury, into Rothersthorpe Vale, through Ladybridge Park, another lake has been created at Shelfleys, the south bank of which is the old course of the brook, passing over a weir as it continues on its course to pass under the A4123 (M1 – M40 link road).

It then passes under the Northampton Arm of the Grand Union Canal, which is carried over it by an aqueduct. Turning now in a northerly direction it passes under a humpback bridge on the Northampton – Rothersthorpe Road, once the old drovers track known as the Banbury Lane. It then passes through Swan Valley and Pineham where there are further man-made balancing lakes for the industrial estates here. Turning easterly sweeping around the western end of Hunsbury Hill it enters the River Nene at Upton Mill.

From source at Horton to the Nene, the brook runs approximately 15 kilometres (9.3 mi).
