= Newnham, Northamptonshire =

Village in Northamptonshire, England

Coordinates: 52.23°N 1.13°W

Newnham
- Location within Northamptonshire
- Population: 580 (2011)
- OS grid reference: SP581597
- Unitary authority: West Northamptonshire
- Ceremonial county: Northamptonshire
- Region: East Midlands
- Country: England
- Sovereign state: United Kingdom
- Post town: DAVENTRY
- Postcode district: NN11
- Dialling code: 01327
- Police: Northamptonshire
- Fire: Northamptonshire
- Ambulance: East Midlands
- UK Parliament: Daventry

Newnham is a village in West Northamptonshire in England. The village is 2 miles (3 km) south of Daventry, 3 miles (5 km) west from Weedon Bec, 6 miles (10 km) west of junction 16 of the M1 motorway and 11 miles (18 km) west of Northampton. The A45 road runs a mile northwest of the village. The nearest railway station is at Long Buckby, 8 miles (13 km) northeast.

The villages name means 'At the new homestead/village' or 'at the new hemmed-in land'.

The village is below Newnham Hill in the valley of the River Nene.

== The parish church ==
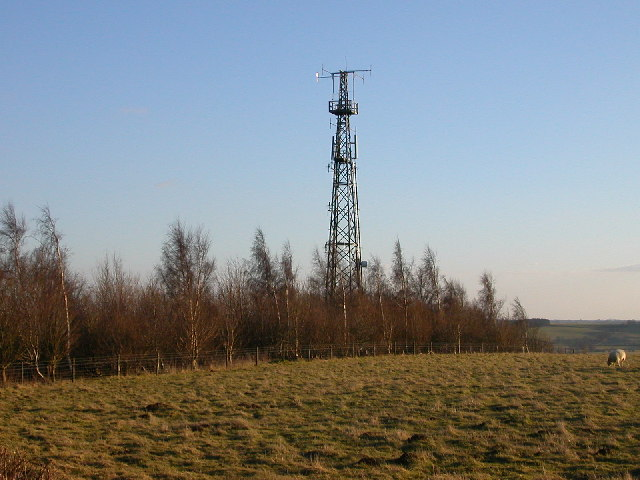
The Air Traffic Control Mast on Newnham Hill

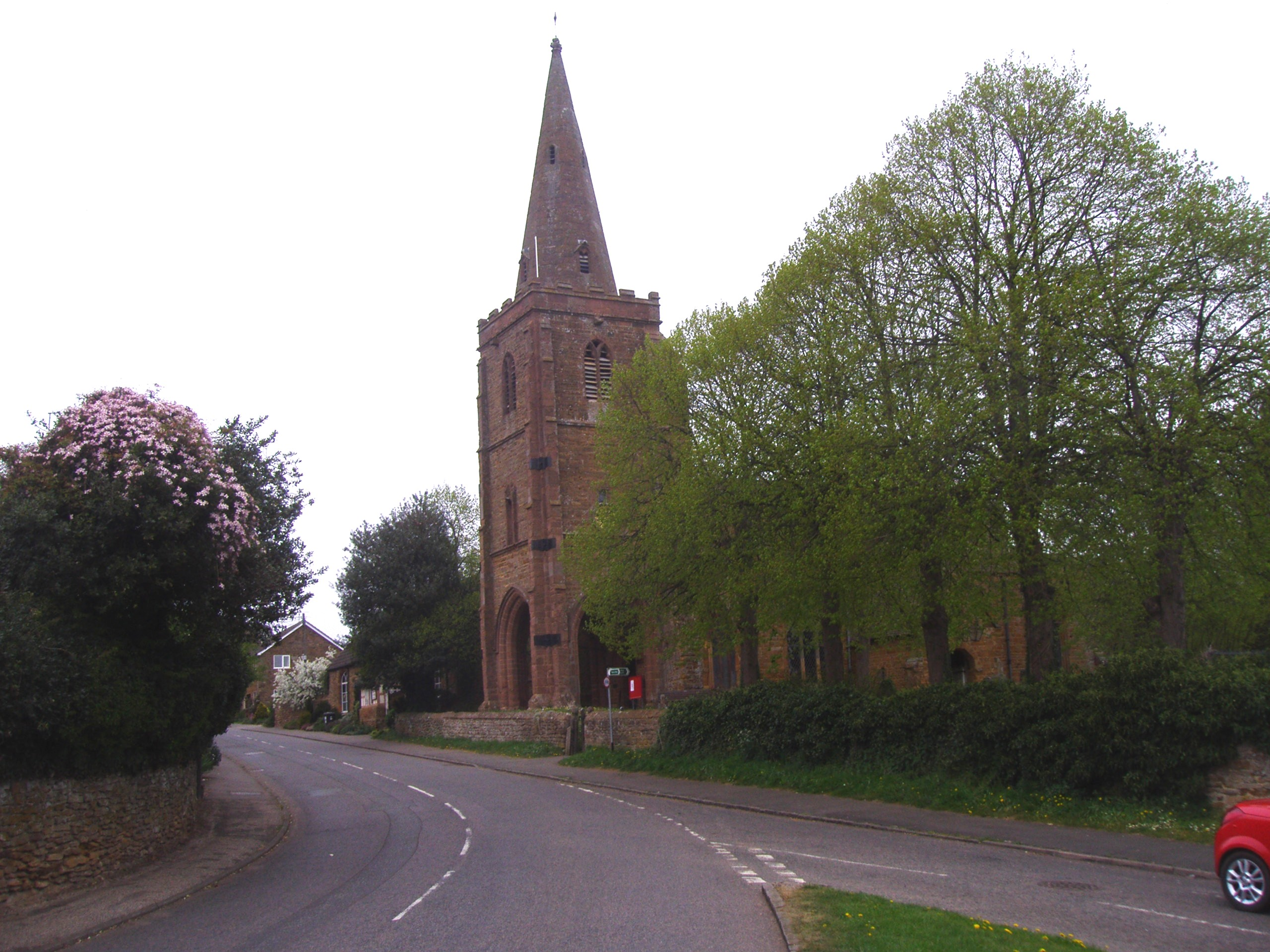
The Parish Church of Saint Michael's

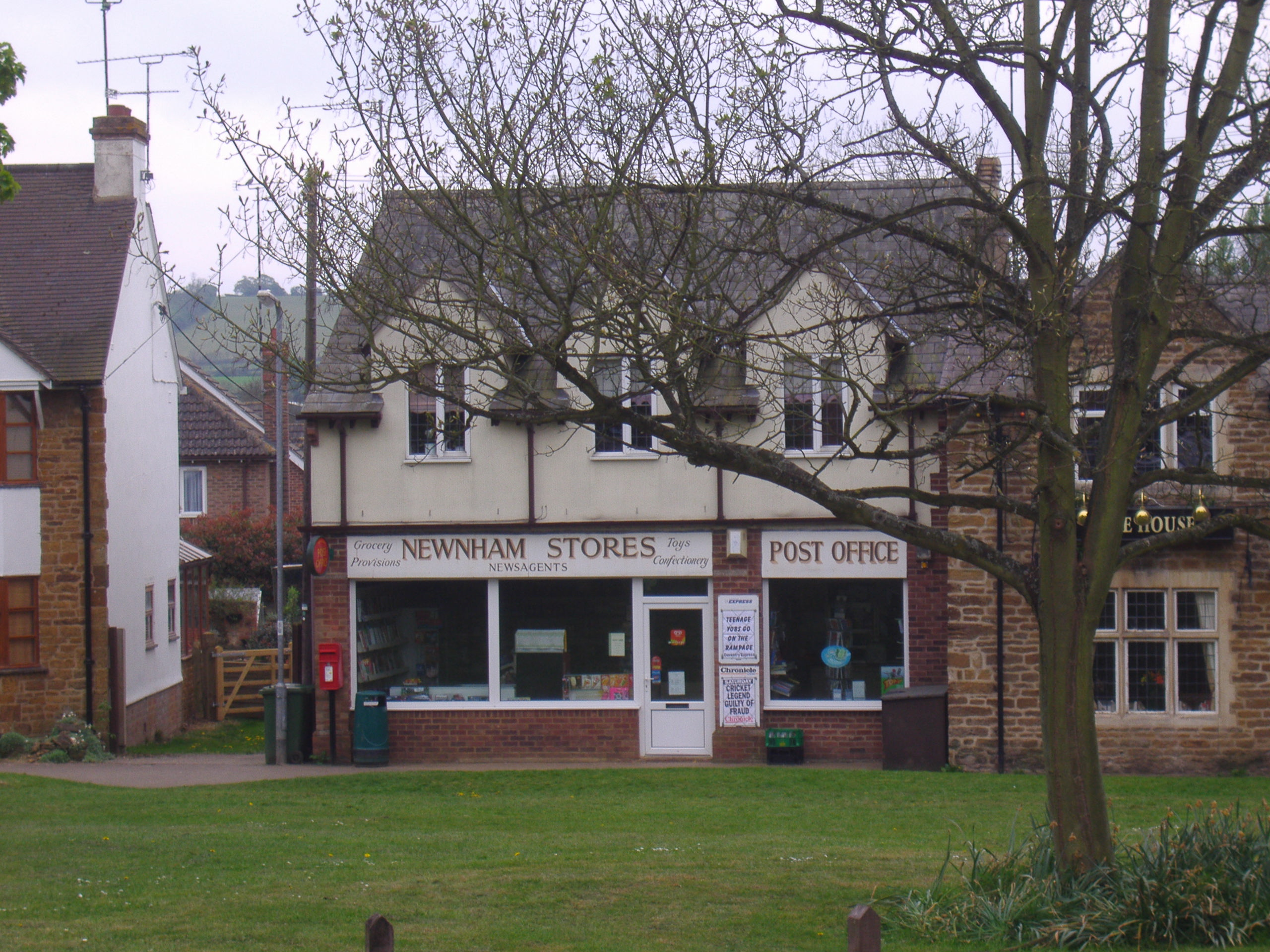
The former Post Office, now being converted into a residential property

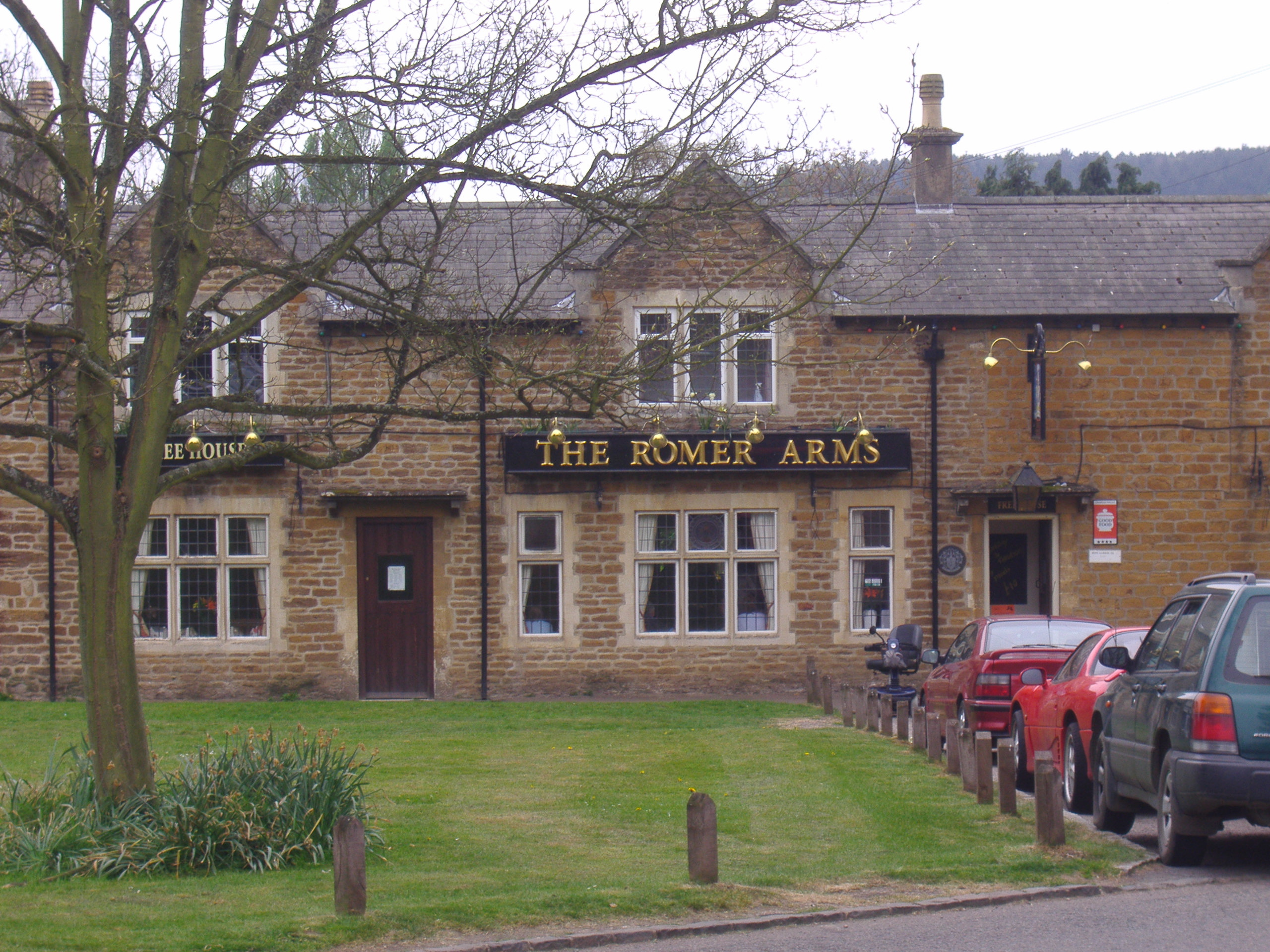
The Romer Arms Public House

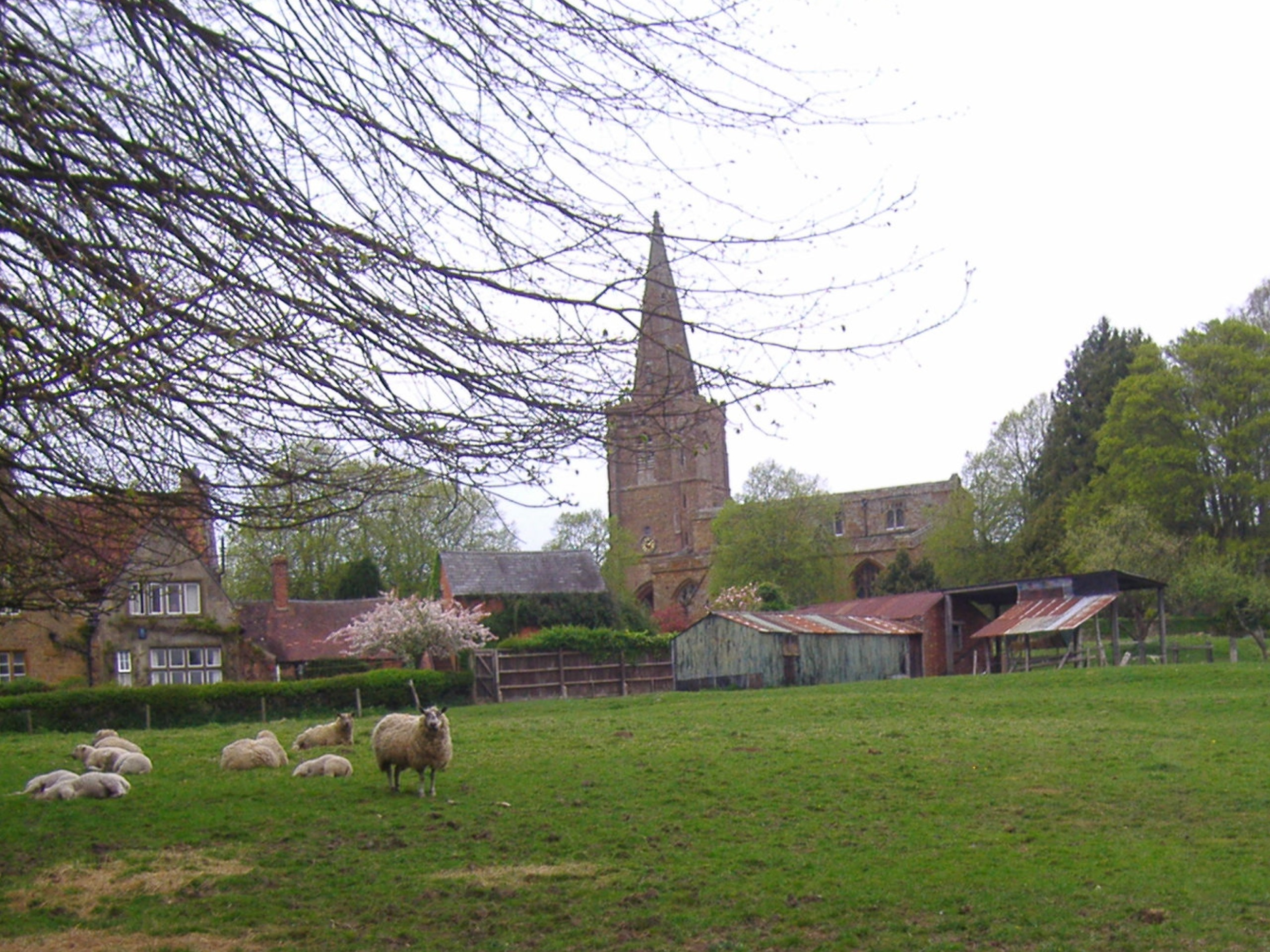
Another view of the Parish Church in Newnham

The parish church, called St Michael and all Angels, is a former chapel of a parent church at Badby. The benefice has always been Badby-cum-Newnham, with the vicarage of Badby. As the church is perched high on a bank, the churchyard descends steeply east and south. The chancel, the north aisle and the present nave were built in the early 14th century, on the site of a 12th-century chapel. The western tower was built in the late 14th or early 15th century abutting the west wall and standing on three open arches. The tower has contained six bells since 1660. They were rehung on a new iron frame by John Taylor & Co in 1940.

== Prominent residents ==
- Thomas Randolph, 17th century poet.
- Nigel Lawson, 20th century politician

== See also ==
- Thomas Randolph, poet and dramatist.
