= Northampton School for Girls =

Location
- Spinney Hill Road; Northampton, Northamptonshire, NN3 6DG; England
- Coordinates: 52°15′56″N 0°52′27″W

Information
- Type: Academy
- Motto: "Respect for Self, Respect for Others, Respect for Learning"
- Established: 1915
- Specialist: Music
- Department for Education URN: 140510 Tables
- Ofsted: Reports
- Head teacher: Cristina Taboada-Naya
- Gender: Girls (mixed 6th Form)
- Age: 11 to 18
- Enrolment: 1754
- Website: http://www.nsg.northants.sch.uk/

Northampton School for Girls (NSG) is a single-sex girls' comprehensive secondary school with academy status, in Northampton, Northamptonshire, England.

== History ==
The school became an academy in 2014.

In 2020, it was reported that the school would be given £2.75 million from the sale of part of the school grounds. The plan was to use this to fund improvements in sports facilities at the school.

== Specialist music status ==
In 2004, the school gained specialist Music College status, the first school in England to do so. Ofsted noted in 2006 that the school's status "benefits the wider community as well. For example, students assist in leading music workshops in primary schools, and the school's orchestra performs at local and national events".

The school is also home to Spinney Hill Theatre, where both NSG students and other groups regularly perform. In the past, the theatre has been used for classical music productions when work is undertaken on the Derngate theatre.

== Academic performance and inspection judgements ==
As of 2022, the school's most recent full inspection by Ofsted was in 2021, with a judgement of Good. There has been no full inspection since the school became an academy in 2014.

In 2019, the school's progress and attainment at GCSE was above average. The average A level grade was C, the same as the average for Northamptonshire, and just below the England average of C+. The school's progress score at A level was -0.08, considered average.

== Notable former pupils ==
- Lady Margaret Douglas-Home, musician, writer, and arts promoter (attended occasionally)
- Lesley Joseph, actress
- Bertha Swirles, physicist
- Luisa Zissman, retail entrepreneur and reality television personality

== See also ==
- Northampton High School for Girls
