= River Nene =

River in eastern England

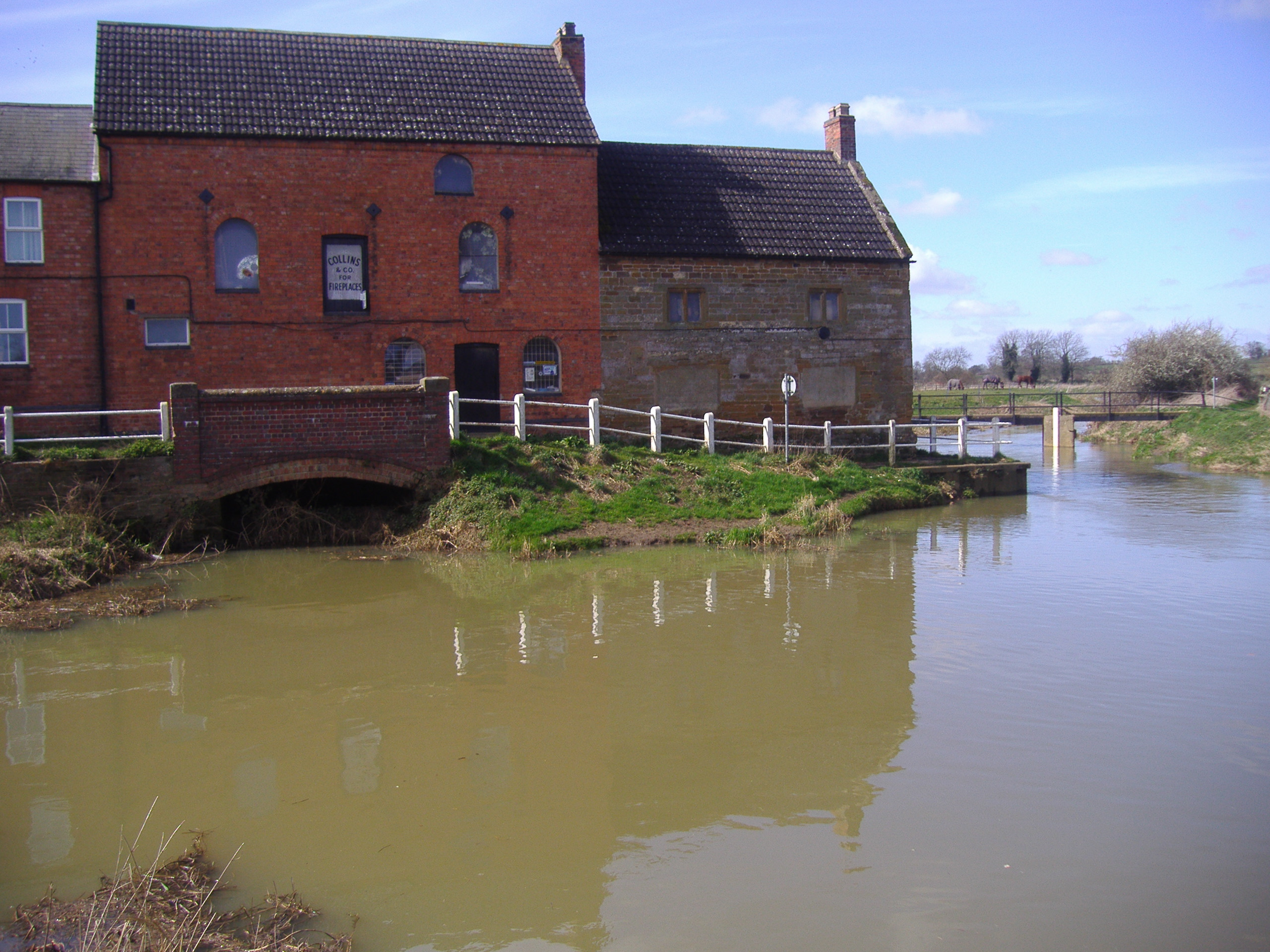
- The River Nene at Kislingbury Watermill, Northamptonshire

Location
- Country: United Kingdom
- Constituent country: England
- Region: Counties: Northamptonshire, Cambridgeshire, Lincolnshire, and Norfolk

Physical characteristics
- Source: Arbury Hill
  - location: Badby, Northamptonshire
  - coordinates: 52.2319°N 1.2105°W
  - elevation: 155 m (509 ft)
- Mouth: The Wash, Lincolnshire
  - coordinates: 52.8524°N 0.2260°E
  - elevation: 0 m (0 ft)
- Length: 105 mi (169 km)
- Basin size: 631 mi^{2} (1,630 km^{2})
- Discharge
  - average: 328 cu ft/s (9.3 m^{3}/s)

Basin features
- Tributaries
  - left: River Ise, Harper's Brook, Willow Brook, Weldon Brook
  - right: River Tove, Whiston Brook, Billing Brook, Alledge Brook, Grendon Brook, Wootton Brook

The River Nene (/ˈnɛn/ or /ˈniːn/) flows through the counties of Northamptonshire, Cambridgeshire, Norfolk and Lincolnshire in eastern England, into The Wash in the North Sea. It flows largely northeast from its sources in Arbury Hill in Northamptonshire to its mouth at Lutton Marsh. The Nene and its tributaries drain an area of about 2,270 square kilometres (880 sq mi), with a population of 750,000.

The Nene's main tributaries include the River Ise, Wootton Brook, Willow Brook, and Harper's Brook. At 105 miles (169 km) long, it is the tenth-longest river in the United Kingdom, and is tidal for 45 kilometres (28 mi) up to Dog-in-a-Doublet sluice, near Peterborough.

The river forms the boundary between Cambridgeshire and Norfolk, and is navigable for 88 miles (142 km), from Northampton to The Wash.

== Etymology ==
Spelling of the river's name has altered over time; it was called the "Nenn" or "Nyn" in an 1810 engraving by draughtsmen George Cole and John Roper, while the Ordnance Survey of 1885 used what has since become standard spelling, "Nene". The origin and meaning of the River Nene's name is unknown. The earliest known examples, which date back to the 10th century AD, have been linked to Indo-European root words for snow, rain, or washing, but a direct connection is purely speculative. According to the British toponymist and medieval scholar Victor Watts, "The name is certainly pre-English, possibly pre-Celtic'. The same name appears in the Neen, the former name of the River Rea in Shropshire, which is retained in the hamlet of Neen Savage.

=== Pronunciation ===
The pronunciation of the river's name varies by locality. Around Peterborough it is usually pronounced /ˈniːn/ (NEEN), and in Northampton (further inland) it is usually pronounced /ˈnɛn/ (NEN). The point at which the pronunciation of the Nene changes has been moving further inland for many years; the latest edition, as of 2006, of the nautical publisher Imray's "Map Of The River Nene" suggests that the pronunciation changes at Thrapston.

== Course ==
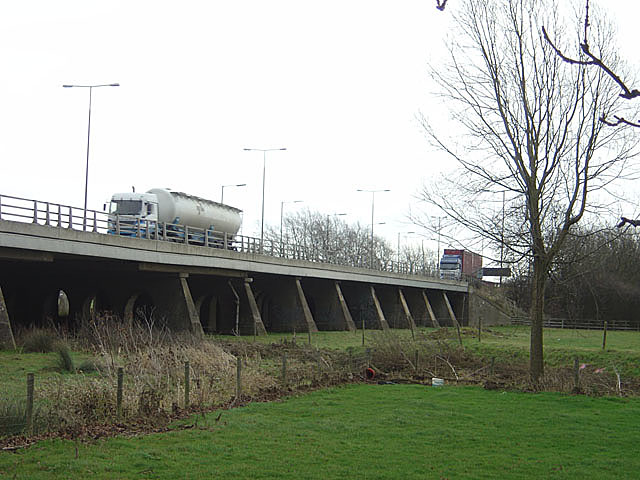
M1 Motorway viaduct over the River Nene just south of junction 16

The River Nene is the tenth-longest river in the United Kingdom. From one of its sources, that near Arbury Hill, to Northampton, the river falls a total of 300 feet (91 m) in 17 miles (27 km). For the remainder of its course, the Nene falls less than 200 feet (61 m). It has a catchment area of 631 square miles (1,630 km^{2}) and a mean flow of 328 cubic feet per second (9.3 m^{3}/s). The final 88 miles (142 km) from Northampton to the Wash is navigable.

The river's most westerly source can be found near the village of Badby, near Daventry. On the eastern slopes of Arbury Hill, and in pools between Arbury Hill and Sharmans Hill, are two tributaries that converge at Dodford Mill to form the upper reaches of the Daventry Nene. The northern stream flows by the villages of Badby and Newnham to the confluence, whilst the southerly stream runs through Fawsley Park and past the village of Everdon before the confluence. From Dodford, the river passes through the village of Weedon where it flows under the West Coast Main Line, the Grand Union Canal, and Watling Street. A little west of Weedon, the river converges with a further northerly tributary arising at Nenmoor Spring to the northwest of West Haddon. The river then flows towards Northampton, passing Flore and Nether Heyford, where it is joined by small streams on either bank. A little past Bugbrooke Mill, the Nene passes under the M1 motorway and falls over a weir towards Kislingbury.

Another tributary merges from the south at Kislingbury. The Nene's course is closely followed by the Grand Union Canal's Northampton arm at Upton Mill.

=== Northampton ===
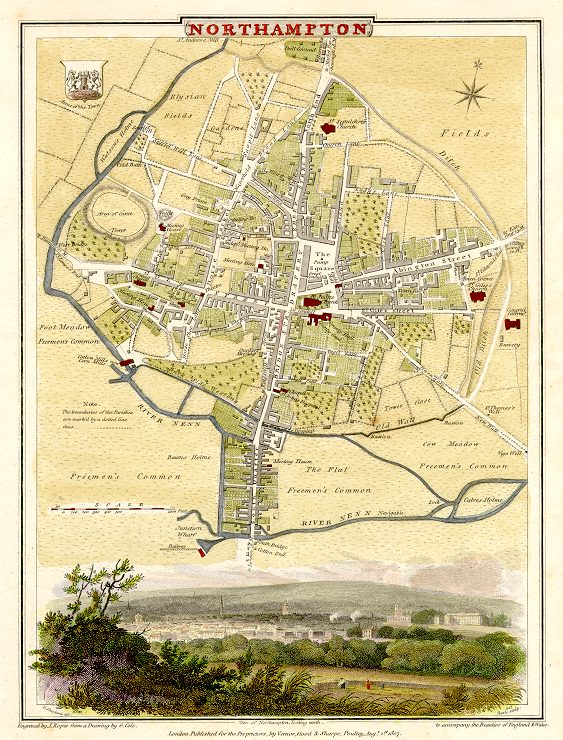
Cole-Roper 1810 map of Northampton

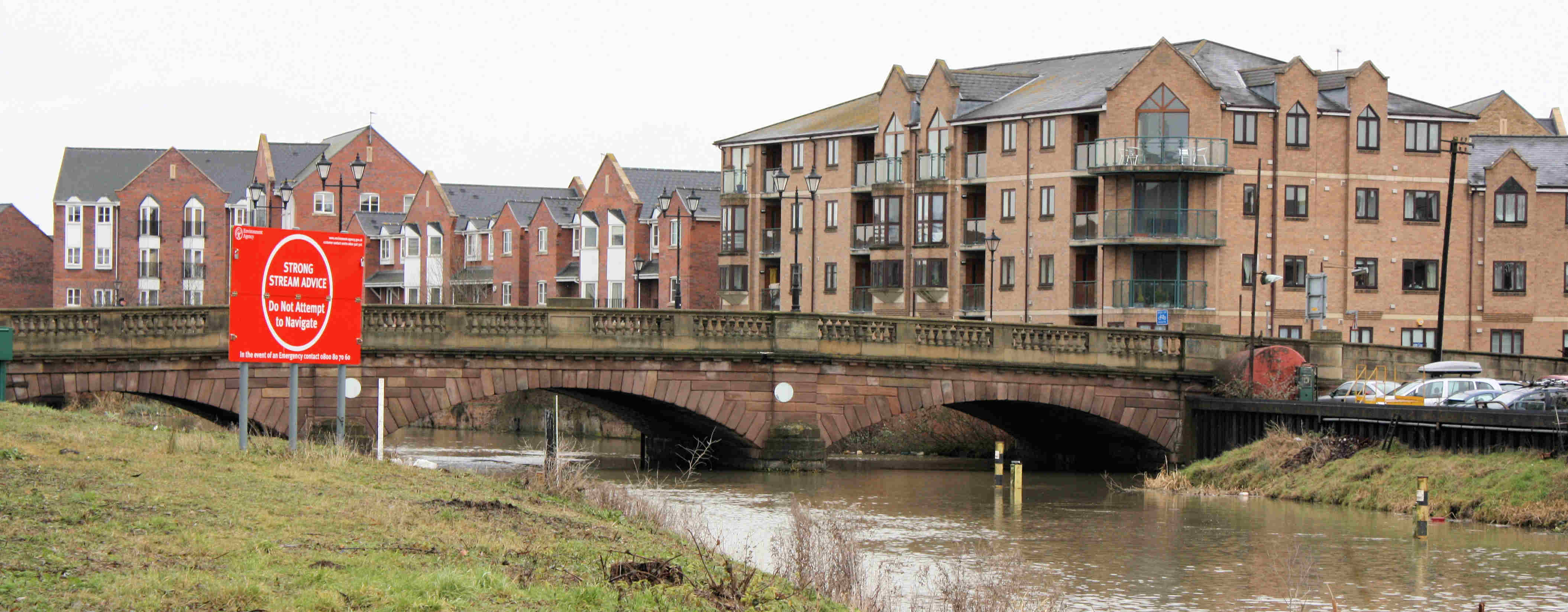
South Bridge over the River Nene looking east with fast current warning notice displayed, 26 February 2010. On the south bank is the Cotton End district of Northampton.

At Upton Mill, another tributary, called Wootton Brook, joins the river from the south. The River Nene now approaches Northampton town from the west, passing between the suburbs of St James (locally known as Jimmy's End), Cotton End and Far Cotton. The Nene's third northern source, the Naseby Source or Brampton Nene, converges at the Carlsberg Brewery. This tributary flows through the north of Northampton where several streams join. Three of these streams supply water for reservoirs at Pitsford, Hollowell and Ravensthorpe, north of Northampton, before joining the Brampton Nene. At Cotton End, the Nene passes under South Bridge, then through Beckett's Park and past the University of Northampton's Waterside Campus, which is on the site of the former Northampton Power Station, on the south bank of the river opposite Midsummer Meadow on the north bank. Northampton Sea Cadets is based in Nunn Mills, and uses the river for the training of boating skills, following the training schemes of the Royal Yachting Association (RYA) and the British Canoe Union (BCU). A short way downstream, a weir can divert some of the Nene's flow to supply the Nene Whitewater Centre.

The River Nene at Northampton was the location of England's first water-powered cotton spinning mill. It was installed on the site of a former corn mill, to the south-west of the town centre, in 1742.

=== Nene Valley ===
From Northampton, the river flows along a broad valley, formed by the enormous amount of water released by the melting ice during the Ice Age, towards the east coast. The Nene now meanders through this wide, flat valley with flood plains, lakes, pools and mature gravel pits on either bank, a byproduct of the large glacial deposits in the valley. At Great Billing is Billing Aquadrome, a popular caravan and camping park with leisure facilities and a funfair, which is based around the river and various mature gravel pits. The park is popular with fishermen and water skiers alike. The river's landscape is now dominated by mature gravel pit lakes. Some gravel extraction still takes place along the valley's basin. At Cogenhoe (pronounced /ˈkʊknoʊ/ locally) the river passes through a watermill. The mill is a red-brick building built in the late nineteenth century, with a slate roof, from which all the machinery has been removed. Adjacent is a mill house, built of coursed limestone rubble, and dated 1725. At Earls Barton the river again passes an area of mature gravel pit lakes, and lock gates numbers 9 and 10. Further on, the river passes through Doddington Lock No. 11 and the nearby Hardwater Watermill. This watermill, mentioned in the Domesday Book, ground wheat into flour for almost 1000 years. Thomas Becket, Archbishop of Canterbury, used the mill as a hiding place after escaping from Northampton Castle in 1164 and fleeing down the Nene to be sheltered by the miller before fleeing to France. The watermill ceased grinding flour after the Second World War. The present buildings date from the late eighteenth and early nineteenth centuries, and have been converted into dwellings.

=== Wellingborough ===
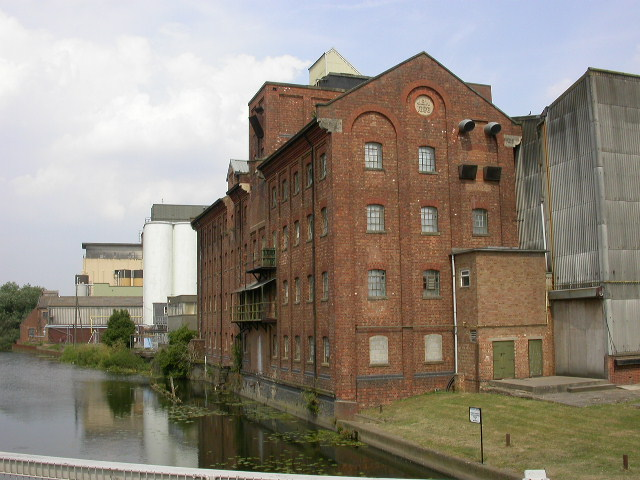
Victoria Mills and its jetty at Wellingborough

The river's course turns to the north-east, passing the town of Wellingborough on its north bank and the village of Little Irchester to the south. At Wellingborough, the river passes through Victoria Mills. Founded in 1886 by the Whitworth family, they are still run by the firm today, producing fine flours for the bakery trade. In front of the mill, there remains a jetty from the days when the river was used for transportation of goods to and from the mills. A little further on, the river is joined from the north by the River Ise. On the opposite bank are the remains of the Roman town of Irchester. The river now passes under a viaduct that carries the Midland Main Line, which links London St Pancras to Sheffield in northern England via Luton, Bedford, Kettering, Leicester, Derby and Chesterfield.

Passing Irthlingborough on its north-western bank, the Nene now flows past one of the former grounds of Kettering Town F.C., the demolished Nene Park. Further on, the river is crossed by the disused track bed of the Northampton and Peterborough Railway which was constructed in 1845. The river is now characterised by large curving meanders as it passes the villages of Little Addington, Great Addington, Woodford and Denford.

=== Thrapston ===
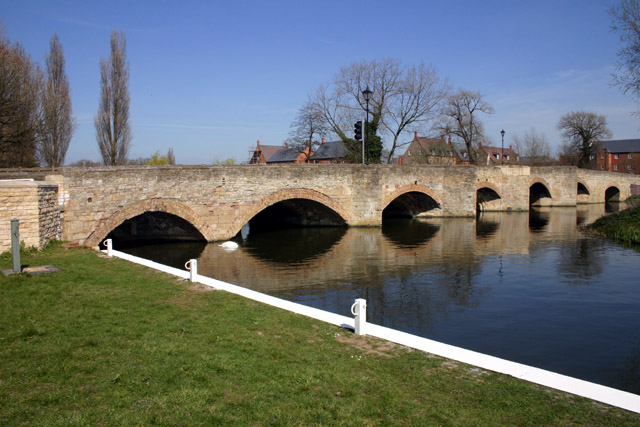
The Nine Arched Bridge at Thrapston

At Denford the river divides into two channels, one of which is used for navigation. The channels approach the town of Thrapston, passing under two adjacent viaducts. One carries the busy A14 trunk road; the other carries the disused railway track bed. Between the town of Thrapston and the village of Islip, the Nene is spanned by a low nine-arched bridge. Just north of Thrapston the river forms part of the 180 acres (73 ha) of Titchmarsh Nature Reserve. The reserve, designated in 1989, consists of two lakes, a woodland, river banks and areas of grass and scrub in which some ponds have been dug. The reserve is operated by the Wildlife Trust for Bedfordshire, Cambridgeshire and Northamptonshire. At Aldwincle another tributary, called Harpers Brook, joins the Nene from the north-west. Harpers Brook flows between gravel pit lagoons before converging with the river. The river flows south of Oundle passing Barnwell Country Park and Oundle Marina under a bridge of the A605 road. At grid reference TL116976, the Romans bridged the river with Ermine Street in the first century. Between Oundle marina and Peterborough the Nene falls, with navigation passing through 11 locks on the way.

=== Peterborough ===
Having passed among the gentle hills of Northamptonshire the river enters the rural part of the City of Peterborough, passing the Nene Valley Railway and through the Nene Park. 1/2 mile (800 m) upstream of the city centre is Woodston Wharf—the site of the old sea lock—originally the extent of the tidal River Nene until the Dog-in-a-Doublet lock at Whittlesey was opened in 1937. To the east of Peterborough city centre a branch of the river passes under the former Great Eastern Railway, now connected to the main East Coast Main Line and running through to Cambridge via Whittlesey and Ely. The branch terminates, for navigation, at Stanground Lock, a connection to the Middle Levels, the drainage system of the Fens through which access is possible to the River Great Ouse. Below Peterborough, the river forms the border between Cambridgeshire and Norfolk for about 3.7 miles (6.0 km).

Continuing downstream leads to the 'Embankment' area and after the cathedral city itself, passing through Whittlesey the landscape changes to the Nene Washes in The Fens and their vast horizons.

The old course of the Nene remains in the fens to the south of the new channel, passing through the former Whittlesey Mere and on to Benwick, March and Upwell.

Beyond Flag Fen the river flows under the A47 bridge at Guyhirn, through the port of Wisbech, then Sutton Bridge in Lincolnshire, and it finally enters The Wash between two towers known as "the lighthouses".

The Nene links the Grand Union Canal to the River Great Ouse, via the Middle Level Navigations. Much of its route has been upgraded to a wide canal with locks at regular intervals. Some sections where artificial cuts run adjacent to the course of the river are known as the "Nene Navigation".

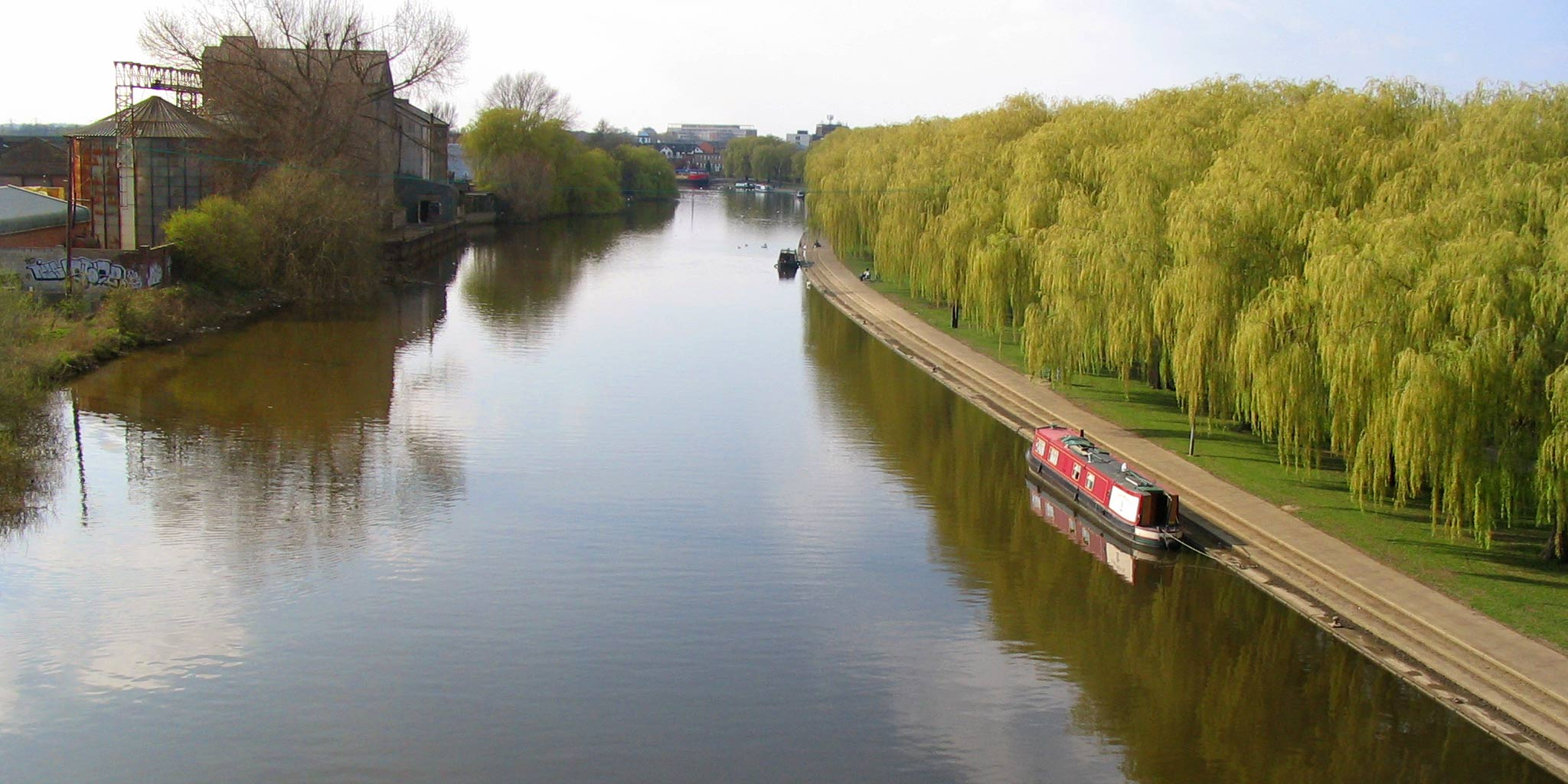
River Nene from Frank Perkins Parkway, Peterborough

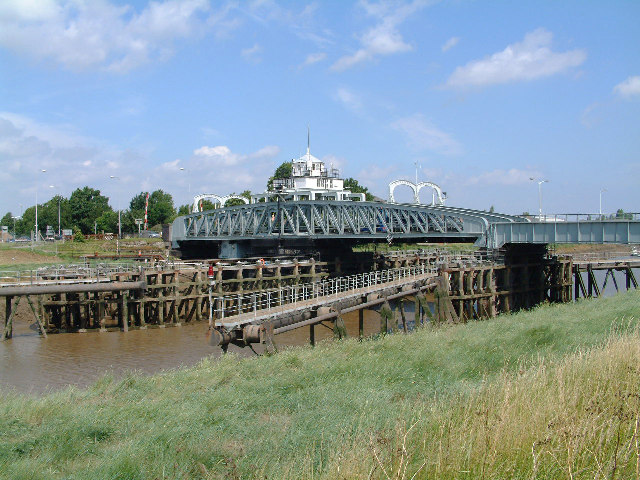
Cross Keys Bridge swing bridge on the Nene before the mouth of The Wash, built in 1897, in the village of Sutton Bridge, south Lincolnshire

== Navigation ==
The Nene is navigable from just above its junction with the Northampton Arm of the Grand Union Canal to the sea. Most leisure use is between Northampton and Peterborough, where it makes a junction with the Middle Level Navigations at Stanground Sluice, which give access to the River Ouse. There is no longer any significant commercial traffic above the Port of Wisbech.

=== Above Peterborough ===
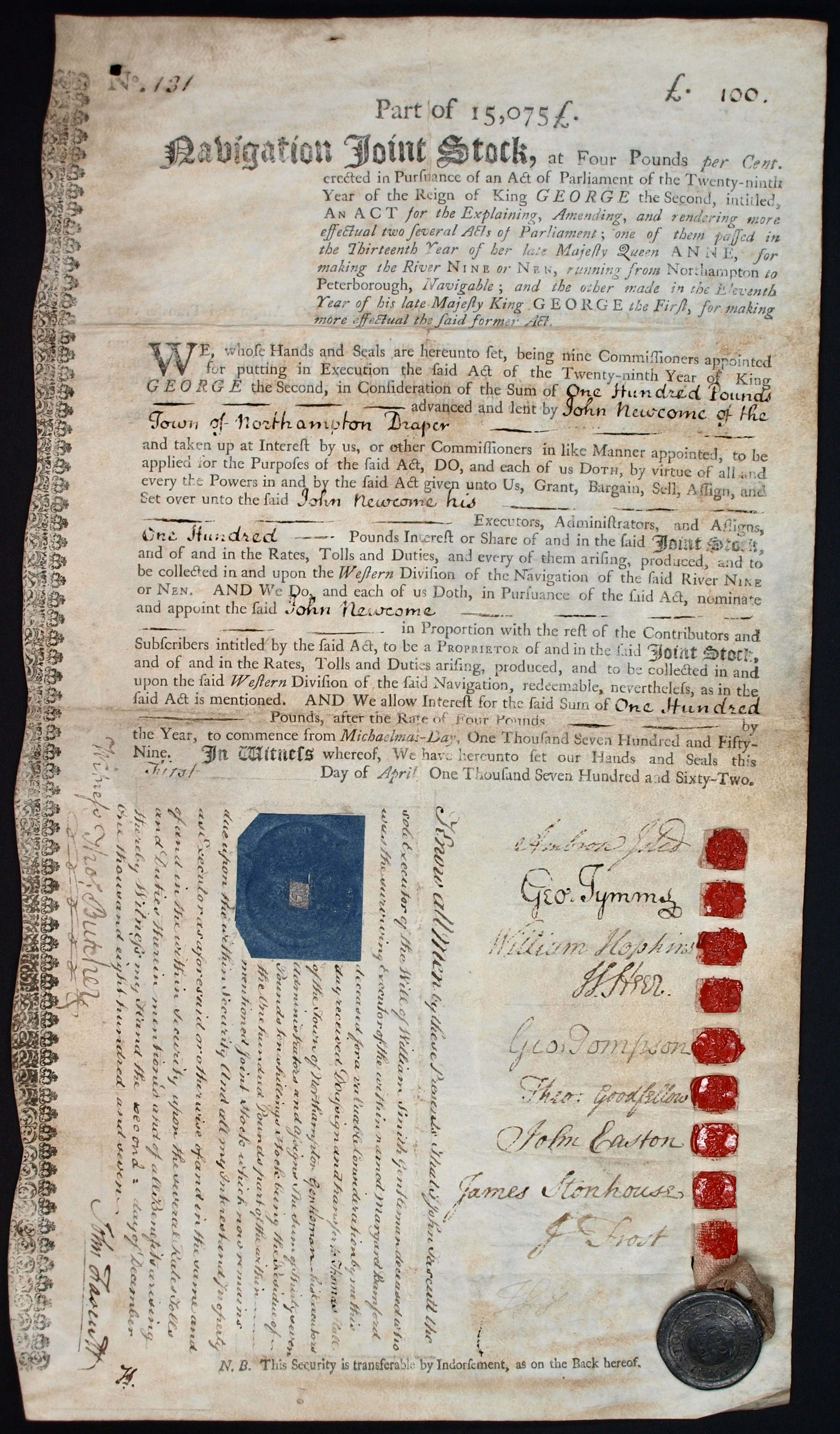
River Nene Navigation Joint Stock certificate for the Western Division of the Navigation, issued 1 April 1762

River Nene (Northampton to Peterborough) Navigation Act 1713
- Act of Parliament
- Parliament of Great Britain
- Long title: An Act for making the River Nine, or Nen, running from Northampton to Peterborough, navigable.
- Citation: 13 Ann. c. 19 (Note: This is the citation in The Statutes of the Realm.); 12 Ann. St. 2. c. 7 Pr. (Note: This is the citation in The Statutes at Large.)
- Territorial extent: Great Britain

Dates
- Royal assent: 28 May 1714
- Commencement: 16 February 1714 (Note: Start of session.)
- Repealed: 22 July 1852
Other legislation
Amended by	River Nene (Norfolk) Navigation Act 1724; River Nene Navigation Act 1756; River Nene Navigation Act 1794
Repealed by	Nene Valley Drainage and Navigation Improvement Act 1852

Status: Repealed

Text of statute as originally enacted

River Nene (Norfolk) Navigation Act 1724
- Act of Parliament
- Parliament of Great Britain
- Long title: An Act for making more effectual an Act passed in the Parliament, holden in the Twelfth Year of the Reign of Her late Majesty Queen Anne, intituled, "An Act for making the River Nine, or Nen, running from Northampton to Peterborough, navigable."
- Citation: 11 Geo. 1. c. 19
- Territorial extent: Great Britain

Dates
- Royal assent: 20 April 1725
- Commencement: 31 May 1725
- Repealed: 22 July 1852
Other legislation
Amends	River Nene (Northampton to Peterborough) Navigation Act 1713
Amended by	River Nene Navigation Act 1756; River Nene Navigation Act 1794
Repealed by	Nene Valley Drainage and Navigation Improvement Act 1852

Status: Repealed

Text of statute as originally enacted

The first recorded attempts to improve the upper river for navigation occurred in 1567 and 1606, when the people of Northampton commissioned surveys. In 1653, a printed pamphlet suggested that 33 locks to bypass the mills could be built for £8,000, to make the river navigable. Eventually, an act of Parliament, the River Nene (Northampton to Peterborough) Navigation Act 1713 (13 Ann. c. 19) was obtained, which appointed large numbers of Commissioners, but stated that work could only proceed if any nine of them could find someone to make the entire river navigable. No-one was prepared to take on the task, although it appears from the Act that the river was navigable from Peterborough to Alwalton at the time. The act was superseded by a second act of Parliament, the River Nene (Norfolk) Navigation Act 1724 (11 Geo. 1. c. 19), which allowed the river to be improved in stages, the work to be carried out at the contractor's expense, with the cost to be recouped from tolls. Robert Wright and Thomas Squire agreed to these terms for the section from Peterborough to the bridge at Oundle North in September 1726, and completed the work by 1730. Squire then agreed to the same terms for the next section to Thrapston in 1736, and completed it by late 1737. This part of the river was then designated as the Eastern Division.

River Nene Navigation Act 1756
- Act of Parliament
- Parliament of Great Britain
- Long title: An Act for the explaining, amending, and rendering more effectual, Two several Acts of Parliament; One of them, passed in the Thirteenth Year of Her late Majesty Queen Anne, for making the River Nine, or Nen, running from Northampton to Peterborough, navigable; and the other, made in the Eleventh Year of His late Majesty King George the First, for making more effectual the said former Act.
- Citation: 29 Geo. 2. c. 69
- Territorial extent: Great Britain

Dates
- Royal assent: 15 April 1756
- Commencement: 13 November 1755
- Repealed: 22 July 1852
Other legislation
Amends	River Nene (Northampton to Peterborough) Navigation Act 1713; River Nene (Norfolk) Navigation Act 1724
Repealed by	Nene Valley Drainage and Navigation Improvement Act 1852
Relates to	River Nene Navigation Act 1794

Status: Repealed

Text of statute as originally enacted

A failure to find anyone prepared to work on the Western Division from Thrapston to Northampton resulted in a third act, the River Nene Navigation Act 1756 (29 Geo. 2. c. 69) being obtained, which allowed the commissioners to borrow money to finance the work. Lenders would become proprietors of the navigation, and the work was to begin at Thrapston and extend the navigable section towards Northampton. It took the commissioners two years to agree who should carry out the work, but on 22 June 1758, John Smith Jnr. from Attercliffe, Yorkshire was contracted to construct 20 pound locks, 20 horse haling bridges and various other works at a cost of £14,070. The river opened to navigation in stages over the next three years, with a great celebration being held at Northampton on 7 August 1761 when the work was completed.

River Nene Navigation Act 1794
- Act of Parliament
- Parliament of Great Britain
- Long title: An Act to remove certain difficulties in the execution of the powers vested in the commissioners appointed by two acts, passed in the thirteenth year of the reign of Queen Anne, and in the eleventh year of the reign of King George the First, for making the river Nine or Nen, running from Northampton to Peterborough, navigable, so far as the same relate to the navigation between Peterborough and Thrapston Bridge.
- Citation: 34 Geo. 3. c. 85
- Territorial extent: Great Britain

Dates
- Royal assent: 17 April 1794
- Commencement: 17 April 1794 (Note: The Acts of Parliament (Commencement) Act 1793.)
- Repealed: 22 July 1852
Other legislation
Amends	River Nene (Northampton to Peterborough) Navigation Act 1713; River Nene (Norfolk) Navigation Act 1724
Repealed by	Nene Valley Drainage and Navigation Improvement Act 1852
Relates to	River Nene Navigation Act 1756

Status: Repealed

Text of statute as originally enacted

The proprietors had the right to use tolls as they saw fit, and the commissioners found that they had no powers to ensure the navigation was maintained in good order. They obtained another act of Parliament, the River Nene Navigation Act 1794 (34 Geo. 3. c. 85), which aimed to rectify the situation, but it was not until 1801 that Thomas Wright replied to their requests, and some repairs were made. There was little traffic and income from tolls was low, at just £488 per year between 1801 and 1804. The commissioners were also keen to see a link constructed from Northampton to the Grand Junction Canal, but the canal company argued that there was an insufficient supply of water. It was agreed that a link would be built in two halves, but that there would be 1 mile (1.6 km) of railway in the middle. When built, the canal company constructed the entire link as a railway, which opened in 1805. In a bid to get a navigable link, the Commissioners opposed the bill to build a link between the Grand Junction Canal and the Old Union Canal, but relented when they had a firm agreement that a navigable link to Northampton would be built. The link cost £35,000, was supervised by Benjamin Bevan, and was built between 1812 and 1815. It was nearly 5 miles (8.0 km) long, and dropped 107 feet (33 m) through 17 locks.

Tolls rose to a little over £1,000 per year, but the commissioners decided that the canal boats damaged the locks, and all traffic had to be transferred to river barges. This order was withdrawn in 1827, but the condition of the river gradually deteriorated, and the arrival of the Blisworth to Peterborough Railway in 1845 further reduced profitability. Flooding was also a problem, but the commissioners had no powers to act as commissioners of sewers, to address the problems of drainage. With serious flooding in December 1848, a public meeting was held, and a committee was elected to consider Nene drainage. The main problem was a restriction at Wisbech, and the engineer James Rendel estimated that £120,000 was required to reconstruct the river below Peterborough. The Nene Valley Drainage and Navigation Improvement Act 1852 was obtained to allow this work to be completed.

=== Below Peterborough ===
Below Peterborough, the river meandered to Tydd Gote, where it shared an outfall to the Wash with the River Great Ouse. Once the latter was diverted to Bishop's Lynn in 1236, the Nene outfall deteriorated. Navigation was improved in the 1470s when Morton's Leam, a straight channel between Peterborough and Wisbech, was constructed by Bishop Morton. It was improved in 1570 and 1631. In 1631 a sluice was built at Wisbech by Vermuyden.

Morton's Leam was largely superseded by Smith's Leam, a straight cut from Peterborough to Guyhirn made by the Bedford Level Corporation in 1728. In order to improve the mouth of the river, which followed a tortuous route through salt marshes, the construction of a new channel was proposed by Nathaniel Kinderley, and work started on it in 1721. It was nearly completed when Wisbech Corporation's support turned to opposition, and they destroyed the work. The cut was eventually completed in 1773, but was not long enough to be a complete success. The Wisbech Canal, opened in 1797, joined the river at Wisbech, the canal was filled in during the 1960s.

Nene Outfall Act 1827
- Act of Parliament
- Parliament of the United Kingdom
- Long title: An Act for improving the Outfall of the River Nene, and the Drainage of the Lands discharging their Waters into the Wisbech River, and the Navigation of the said Wisbech River from the upper End of Kinderley's Cut to the Sea; and for embanking the Salt Marshes and Dare Sands lying between the said Cut and the Sea.
- Citation: 7 & 8 Geo. 4. c. lxxxv
- Territorial extent: United Kingdom

Dates
- Royal assent: 14 June 1827
- Commencement: 14 June 1827
Other legislation
Amended by	North Level and Nene Valley Drainage Act 1829

Status: Amended

Text of statute as originally enacted

North Level and Nene Valley Drainage Act 1829
- Act of Parliament
- Parliament of the United Kingdom
- Long title: An Act for altering, amending, and enlarging the Powers granted by an Act passed in the Seventh and Eighth Years of the Reign of His present Majesty, for improving the Outfall of the River Nene, and the Drainage of the Lands discharging their Waters into the Wisbech River, and the Navigation of the said Wisbech River from the upper End of Kinderley's Cut to the Sea, and for embanking the Salt Marshes and Bare Sands lying between the said Cut and the Sea.
- Citation: 10 Geo. 4. c. civ
- Territorial extent: United Kingdom

Dates
- Royal assent: 1 June 1829
- Commencement: 1 June 1829
Other legislation
Amends	Nene Outfall Act 1827

Status: Current legislation

Text of statute as originally enacted

Various proposals for improvements near Wisbech were made, notably in 1814 by John Rennie and again in 1821 by Thomas Telford, but all were opposed by Wisbech Corporation. The Nene Outfall Act 1827 (7 & 8 Geo. 4. c. lxxxv) to enable the works and Wisbech contributed £30,000 to the project. The contractors for the new cut below Wisbech were Jolliffe and Banks, who charged £149,259 for the channel. Once the old channel was dammed up, the tidal scour in the new channel was sufficient to remove silt deposits, and large volumes of stone were needed to stabilise the banks. The effects on the Port of Wisbech were immediate, with tonnage rising from 63,180 long tons (64,190 t) in 1830 to 159,678 long tons (162,240 t) in 1845.

Nene Valley Drainage and Navigation Improvement Act 1852 (Note: Section 2.)
- Act of Parliament
- Parliament of the United Kingdom
- Long title: An Act for constituting Commissioners for the Improvement of the River Nene and the Navigations thereof; for the more effectual Drainage of certain Lands in the Counties of Northampton, Huntingdon, and Cambridge; and for other Purposes.
- Citation: 15 & 16 Vict. c. cxxviii
- Territorial extent: United Kingdom

Dates
- Royal assent: 30 June 1852
- Commencement: 22 July 1852 (Note: Section 1.)
Other legislation
Amended by	Nene Valley Drainage and Navigation Improvement (Amendment) Act 1854

Status: Amended

Text of statute as originally enacted

Nene Valley Drainage and Navigation Improvement (Amendment) Act 1854
- Act of Parliament
- Parliament of the United Kingdom
- Long title: An Act to amend "The Nene Valley Drainage and Navigation Improvement Act, 1852," and to provide additional Funds for carrying out certain of the Improvements authorized by such Act.
- Citation: 17 & 18 Vict. c. lxxxii
- Territorial extent: United Kingdom

Dates
- Royal assent: 3 July 1854
- Commencement: 3 July 1854
Other legislation
Amends	Nene Valley Drainage and Navigation Improvement Act 1852

Status: Current legislation

Nene Valley Act 1862
- Act of Parliament
- Parliament of the United Kingdom
- Long title: An Act to amend the Acts relating to the Nene Valley Drainage and Navigation Improvement; and to make Provision for the Discharge of the Debts and Liabilities of the Commissioners in the Third District of Drainage, and for the Separation of the Districts; and for other Purposes.
- Citation: 25 & 26 Vict. c. clxiv
- Territorial extent: United Kingdom

Dates
- Royal assent: 17 July 1862
- Commencement: 17 July 1862

Status: Current legislation

Text of statute as originally enacted

The Nene Valley Drainage and Navigation Improvement Act 1852 (15 & 16 Vict. c. cxxviii) gave the commissioners wide powers to manage the river, but created an administrative structure that was too complex to be workable. With the river in a poor state, James Rendel was appointed as engineer, and began dredging the channel and raising the banks, which cost £124,000. Another act of Parliament, the Nene Valley Drainage and Navigation Improvement (Amendment) Act 1854 (17 & 18 Vict. c. lxxxii) was obtained in 1854, to allow the commissioners to borrow £325,000 to pay for the work. A new iron swing bridge was built in Wisbech, to replace a narrow stone bridge which restricted the flow of the river, and although it was tested on installation, it was not operated subsequently. In 1856 a very high tide came within two feet of the newly installed pilings. Dams across the river were built at Waldersea and Guyhirn, and an underwater weir was constructed below the bridge at Wisbech. Wisbech Corporation took the commissioners to court in 1859 for obstructing the river, and when an initial judgment was made in their favour, gangs of men destroyed most of the Waldersea dam overnight. An appeal to the Court of Chancery by the commissioners also failed, and the dams were removed, as was the Wisbech weir, after an accident involving a train of lighters.

Navigation was always hampered by the Northey Gravel shoal near Dog-in-a-Doublet. Together with a sluice, this prevented salt water from entering the Thorney River, and the Duke of Bedford had obtained an injunction in 1865 to prevent interference with it. An appeal to have the injunction removed in 1880 failed. A dock covering 13 acres (5.3 ha) was built at Sutton Bridge at this time, but the outer wall collapsed on 9 June 1881, a few days before it was officially opened, and the estimated repair costs of £160,000 resulted in the project failing. Sporadic traffic managed to use the river, but its condition continued to deteriorate. In 1893, a boating tragedy occurred near Sutton Bridge, in which nine people died.

=== Reconstruction ===
By the time the Nene Catchment Board took control of the river, as a result of the passing of the Land Drainage Act 1930, the river was "in unparalleled decay and dilapidation". The Board rebuilt all of the locks, and replaced the remaining staunches with locks. A new lock and sluice were built at Dog-in-a-Doublet, to prevent salt water passing up the river, and to maintain water levels to Peterborough. The Thorney River was closed for navigation, arrangements were made for the supply of fresh water to the Thorney Estate, and the Northey Gravel shoal was blown up with dynamite. The banks of the river at Wisbech were protected with piling for a distance of 2 miles (3.2 km), and a new quay was built. A new concrete bridge was built at Wisbech; at the time it was the largest portal bridge in the country, the span being 92.5 feet. The benefits of the new works were proved in the floods of 1947, when land bordering the Nene was not inundated.

The new locks resulted in some commercial traffic returning to the river. The Port of Wisbech can handle ships up to 260 by 40 feet (79 by 12 m) long and with a draught of 17 feet (5.2 m), and remained a commercial port in 2021. It also caters for smaller boats, with a major expansion of the facilities at the yacht harbour completed in May 2000.

=== Eagre ===
In a lecture at Wisbech & Fenland Museum John Gardiner recalled seeing the rush of the tide below, and an 'eagre' or 'tidal bore', which was a great wave that came rolling up on the tide from the mouth of the Nene, one to four feet high in height. This ceased after the opening of a new cut.

=== Operation ===
There are canal locks at fairly regular intervals which will accommodate boats up to 78 by 13 feet (23.8 by 4.0 m), with a draught of 4 feet (1.2 m), although most of the boats on the upper river are canal-type narrowboats and river cruisers. Below Peterborough, boats are restricted by the size of Dog-in-a-Doublet lock, which is 130 by 20 feet (39.6 by 6.1 m) (a measured width of 7.937 metres (26.04 ft)) with 6.7 feet (2.0 m) draught, while below Wisbech, small ships can be accommodated. All but a handful of the locks have conventional mitre gates at the upstream end and a single vertically lifting guillotine gate at the downstream end. This arrangement permits the use of the locks as additional weirs in time of flood, when the mitre gates are chained open and the guillotines lifted to allow the water to flow straight through. This precludes navigation at these times.

Traditionally the guillotines were manually operated by turning a large wheel some 150 times to raise or lower the gate; since the locks have to be left empty this operation will always have to be done twice to pass through. In recent years the Environment Agency, who are the navigation authority for the river, have been installing electric operation of the guillotines and in some cases replacing them altogether with mitre gates.

== Water quality ==
The Environment Agency measures the water quality of the waterways in England. Each is given an overall ecological status, which may be one of five levels: high, good, moderate, poor and bad. There are several components that are used to determine this, including biological status, which looks at the quantity and varieties of invertebrates, angiosperms and fish. Chemical status, which compares the concentrations of various chemicals against known safe concentrations, is rated good or fail.

The water quality of the River Nene system was as follows in 2019/2022.

Section	Ecological Status	Chemical Status	Length	Catchment	Channel
Nene - headwaters to conf Whilton Branch	Poor	Fail	7.0 miles (11.3 km)	8.60 square miles (22.3 km^{2})	
Nene - conf Whilton Branch to conf Brampton Branch	Poor	Fail	10.1 miles (16.3 km)	15.73 square miles (40.7 km^{2})	
Nene - conf Brampton Branch to conf Ise	Moderate	Fail	12.9 miles (20.8 km)	25.64 square miles (66.4 km^{2})	heavily modified
Nene - conf Ise to Islip	Moderate	Fail	15.9 miles (25.6 km)	19.31 square miles (50.0 km^{2})	heavily modified
Nene - Islip to tidal	Moderate	Fail	41.8 miles (67.3 km)	57.62 square miles (149.2 km^{2})	heavily modified

Reasons for the water quality being less than good include runoff from agricultural and rural land and discharges from sewage treatment plants. This results in high levels of phosphate in the river, which affect plant life (macrophytes and phytobenthos) in the upper river and fish populations in the lower river. Other contributing factors include barriers, notably locks, which inhibit the movement of fish along the waterway. Like most waterways in the UK, the chemical status changed from good to fail in 2019, due to the presence of polybrominated diphenyl ethers (PBDE), perfluorooctane sulphonate (PFOS) and mercury compounds, none of which had previously been included in the assessment.

== Flooding ==
=== January 1978 floods ===
On 11 and 12 January, the 1978 North Sea storm surge caused extensive coastal flooding. Higher water levels were reached than during the devastating North Sea flood of 1953. Flooding affected both banks of the river at Wisbech. A 70-year-old woman was reported drowned in her flooded home in Wisbech after the Nene burst its banks forcing 1000 people to evacuate their homes. Clarkson Geriatric Day Hospital was closed for weeks as repairs were made.

=== Easter 1998 floods ===
On 8 and 9 April 1998, constant torrential rain caused flooding across large parts of the English Midlands. On Good Friday, 10 April 1998, the floods peaked and many rivers burst their banks. The Nene was badly affected, flooding low-lying parts of Northampton, Wellingborough, Earls Barton and other settlements on its banks. The town centre of Northampton lies on the northern slope of the Nene Valley and escaped the river's flooding. However, the Cotton End, Far Cotton and St James End areas of the town occupy the flood plain and have borne the brunt of severe flooding over the years, culminating in the 1998 Easter floods. In 2002, a siren warning system was installed in Northampton to warn residents in the event of further flooding, and embankments and flood walls were bolstered to protect the town. In Kislingbury village, a flood alleviation scheme was completed in 2004.

In 2007, the Government announced it would spend £6 million on flood defences at Upton Mill in the west of Northampton; wetland areas and embankments were to be constructed along the river.

=== 2013 flood ===
In December 2013, the 2010 £12 million project at Wisbech to protect 10,590 residents and 1,200 businesses with an improved flood defence regime prevented another major incursion of water. The water came within inches of reaching the top of the flood walls and water poured across the roads near flood gates, bringing traffic on North End Road, Wisbech to a standstill.

== The Nene in the arts ==
In 2016, composer Benjamin Till was commissioned by NMPAT (Northamptonshire Music and Performing Arts Trust) to create a major orchestral and choral work about the Nene. The composition was scored for 800 musicians and premiered at the Royal Albert Hall in 2017, before being performed at Northampton's Derngate Theatre and Peterborough Cathedral. The piece quotes tradition folk melodies from towns and villages along the river, and explores ghost stories, myths and legends associated with the Nene.

== Namesakes ==
The river gave its name to a boat, Nene, of Wisbech (one of whose crew was drowned in the river in 1830); the former football team Wisbech Nene Rovers; the former Nene College of Higher Education in Northampton (now the University of Northampton); the Nene derby; and also to the Rolls-Royce Nene turbojet engine—Rolls-Royce's practice being to name its gas turbine designs after British rivers. The river may also be linked to the fact that Sir Henry Royce was born in Alwalton, a village which is by the river, near Peterborough.

== See also ==
- Association of Nene River Clubs
- Nene Valley Colour Coated Ware
- Nene Way—a long-distance footpath
- Rivers of the United Kingdom

== Bibliography ==
- Boyes, John; Russell, Ronald (1977). The Canals of Eastern England. David and Charles. ISBN 978-0-7153-7415-3.
- Butler, M; Eaton, C (1998). Learn Yersalf Northamptonshire Dialect. Dereham, Norfolk: Nostalgia Publications. ISBN 978-0-947630-23-2.
- Ekwall, Eilert (1960). Oxford Dictionary of English Place Names (4th ed.). Oxford University Press. ISBN 978-0-19-869103-7.
- Mills, A. D. (1998). A Dictionary of English Place-Names (2nd ed.). Oxford University Press. ISBN 978-0-19-280074-9.
- Owen, Sue; et al. (2005). Rivers and the British Landscape. Carnegie Publishing. ISBN 978-1-85936-120-7.
- Smith, Iain (2006). The River Nene. Imray Laurie Norie and Wilson. ISBN 978-0-85288-944-2.
- Watts, Victor (2004). Cambridge Dictionary of English Place-Names (1st ed.). Cambridge University Press. ISBN 978-0-521-16855-7.
