= Harper's Brook =

River in Northamptonshire, England

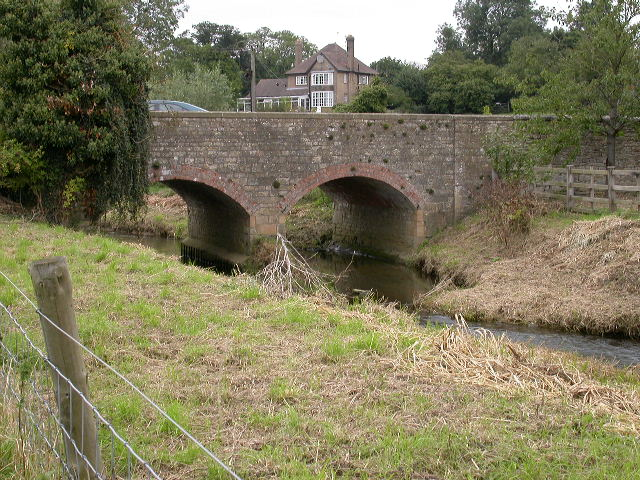
- Harper's Brook at Lowick

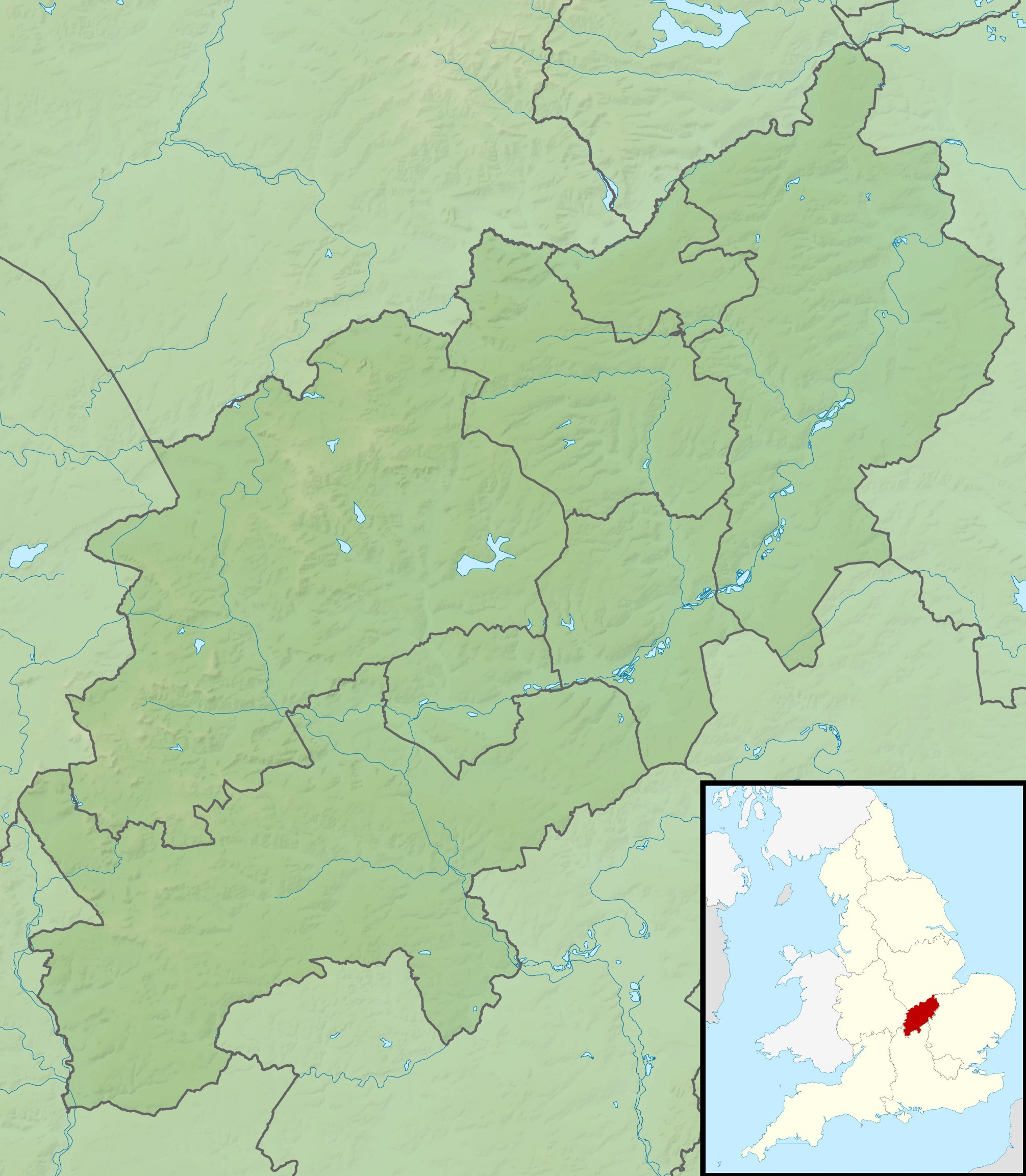
- Location of the river mouth in Northamptonshire

Location
- Sovereign State: United Kingdom
- Country: England
- County: Northamptonshire

Physical characteristics
- Source
  - location: Desborough
  - coordinates: 52.460459°N 0.814013°W
  - elevation: 137 m (449 ft)
- Mouth: River Nene
  - location: Aldwinckle
  - coordinates: 52.428576°N 0.506414°W
  - elevation: 28 m (92 ft)
- Basin size: 73.26 km^{2} (28.29 sq mi)

Basin features
- River system: River Nene

Harper's Brook is a tributary of the River Nene which runs through Northamptonshire.

According to sources (ordnance survey sheet 141) it rises to the North of Desborough and meanders through the north of the county of Northamptonshire, passing through the town of Corby and on until it joins the River Nene at Aldwinckle, just north of Thrapston.
