= Badby =

Village in Northamptonshire, England

Coordinates: 52°13′32″N 1°10′57″W

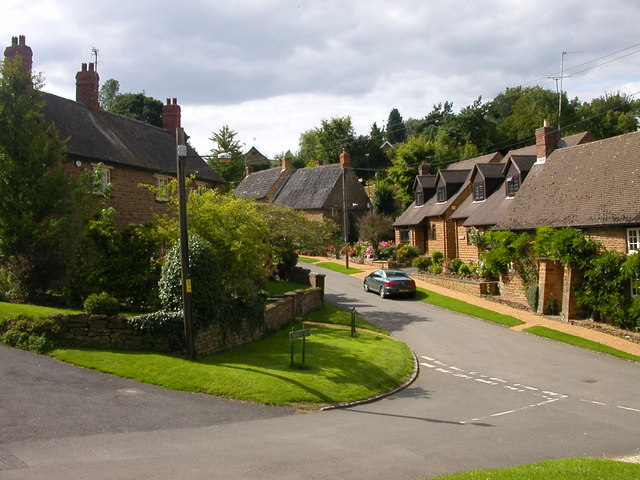
- Church Hill (bottom), Bunkers Hill (top), Badby

- Location within Northamptonshire
- Population: 632 (2011)
- OS grid reference: SP559590
  - London: 65 miles (105 km)
- Civil parish: Badby
- Unitary authority: West Northamptonshire
- Ceremonial county: Northamptonshire
- Region: East Midlands
- Country: England
- Sovereign state: United Kingdom
- Post town: DAVENTRY
- Postcode district: NN11
- Dialling code: 01327
- Police: Northamptonshire
- Fire: Northamptonshire
- Ambulance: East Midlands
- UK Parliament: Daventry

Badby is a village and a rural parish of about 2,020 acres (820 ha) in West Northamptonshire, England.

== Location ==
Badby is about 2 miles (3 km) south of Daventry, on the A361 Daventry to Banbury road, which still follows the route of the Lutterworth-Daventry-Banbury turnpike as approved in 1765. The parish is bisected west to east, at about 395 feet (120 m) above sea level, by the upper reaches of the River Nene. The village is mainly south of the river, where the land rises to Badby Down at 610 feet (190 m).

== Demographics ==
Its population has fluctuated between 450 and 625 from 1801 to 1971, with a low point of 410 in 1901, then to a high of 720 in 1991. It was 645 in 2001, 632 in 2011 and up to 701 in the 2021 census.

== Name ==
The village's name means 'Badda's fortification'. the second element was replaced with early Old Norse 'by', meaning 'farm/settlement'.

Badby is spelt in various ways since Saxon times, through the Norman period, until printing stabilised it in the present form. Badby, Badbye, Baddebi, Baddeby, Badebi and Badeby are all found. Baddanbyrg or Baddan Byrig were used in the 944 AD charter, but these more likely refer specifically to Arbury Hill (see below).

== History ==
There are several mediaeval charters referring to the area around Badby, but some are suspect. The land around Badby and Newnham changed hands frequently as the swirling forces of Mercia and the invading Danes ebbed and flowed across middle England.

Badby and Newnham manors were treated as one until the Knightleys sold Newnham manor to the Thorntons of Brockhall in 1634. The church benefice has always been Badby with Newnham (or Badby-cum-Newnham), Newnham being a chapel of the parent church at Badby in the initial times, but for a few years was recorded as the main church. The shared rector or vicar arrangement goes back 750 years.

=== Saxon ===
Charters record that the land was given by a Saxon sheriff (or shire reeve), Norman, to the Abbey of Croyland (or Crowland) around the year 726. To fund defence against the invading Danes around 871, Beorred seized it back and gave it to his army officers to secure their services.

In a charter dated 944, King Edmund I of England gave an estate comprising Dodford, Everdon and all of Badby with Newnham to Bishop Aelfric of Hereford. After Edmund's murder in 946, the estate was returned in 948 to Croyland by his brother, King Edred (or Aedred, Ædred, Edric) on the advice of Turketul (or Turketulus), his chancellor. Abbot Godric II of Croyland, to buy protection against the threatening Danes, leased Badby in 1006 for 100 years to Norman (or Northman), son of Leofwine, Earl of Leicester (and Chester), a great military officer under King Edred.

The Danes attacked and prevailed in 1013 under their King Sweyn (or Sveyn), who died in 1014. He was eventually succeeded by his son Canute (or Cnut, Knud, Knut). In 1016 Norman was killed and in 1017 Edred was executed by King Canute. Canute thus acquired Badby and later transferred it to Norman's brother, the Earl Leofric of Mercia, who had supported Canute and was married to the famous Godiva (or Godgifu). In turn, Earl Leofric gave the lordship of the manor of Badby and Newnham to the Benedictine Abbey of Evesham, for the remainder of the 100-year lease supposedly granted by Abbot Godric II of Croyland. This was ratified by King Canute in 1018. The Anglo-Saxons and the Danes began to settle together.

=== Norman ===
Then the Normans arrived. In their Domesday Book of 1086, Badby is listed under the lands owned by Croyland Abbey, ignoring the lease to Evesham. Around 1124, as the lease had ended, elderly Abbot Joffrid of Croyland set about resolving with Evesham the ownership of Badby. The fire that burned down Croyland Abbey in 1091 destroyed any deeds, if they existed. Abbot Reginald of Evesham convinced Joffrid that Croyland had no claim. The retention by Evesham was confirmed in 1246 in a charter by King Henry III and again in 1330 by King Edward III after a court hearing.

Evesham Abbey built a moated grange or farm headquarters 500 yards north-east of the church. The house was built by the notorious Abbot Roger Norreys in 1189. He was a well known womaniser who was exiled to the small and distant priory of Penwortham in 1213. In 1246 King Henry III granted free warren within Badby Wood and authorised the formation of a deer park for hunting and food. The enclosing embankments and ditches of the deer park still exist to the east of the village. Archeological excavations of the grange site in 1965-69 identified work from the 13th to 16th centuries. Three bakehouses were added in the 1350s; its hall and chapel were renovated in the 1380s. It continued in a variety of uses after the dissolution of the abbey during the Protestant Reformation. The grange finally tumbled down in 1722. Its remains lie hidden in a thicket at 52.227734, -1.177539 which unfortunately developed after the excavations ended.

In 1316, there was no Abbot in post, so King Edward II appointed Thomas de Evesham, one of his Chancery clerks, as rector of the benefice. The licence, which moved more control of, and finance from, Badby and Newnham to the Abbot of Evesham, was effected through Pope John XXII with Henry Berghersh, Bishop of Lincoln. It was in 1343 that the endowment for a vicar was laid down in a Lincoln diocesan document Ordinacio Vicarie in Ecclesia de Baddeby; 1343, and Reginald Musard became the first vicar.

=== Ecclesiastical ===
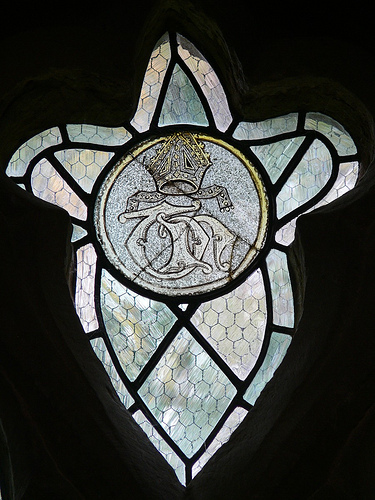
Initials of Thomas Newbold, Abbot of Evesham (1491-1514) Stained glass c. 1500 St Mary, Badby

Since its foundation in 709, Evesham Abbey had successfully developed an independent existence. It could not avoid being dissolved in November 1539, during the Protestant Reformation and founding of the Church of England.

In the 9th century, the parish was in the Diocese of Dorchester (Oxon), a safer location adopted by an earlier Bishop of Leicester to avoid the invading Danes. The seat was moved to Lincoln in 1073 by Remigius. Lincoln Diocese was itself split on 4 September 1541 and Badby church, in Daventry deanery, came within the new but poorly endowed Diocese of Peterborough, in which it remains. It is now closer to six other cathedrals of the Church of England, which are, in order of distance: Coventry, Leicester, Oxford, Birmingham, Lichfield and Worcester.

=== Later times ===
King Henry VIII granted the manors of Badby and Newnham in 1542 to Sir Edmund Knightley and his wife Ursula and their heirs. The dower house in Fawsley Park, last inhabited in 1704, is now in ruins. It was built for Lady Ursula after Sir Edmund died. There was considerable unrest in the parish in the last 20 years of the 16th century, when Valentine Knightley attempted to transfer much area of arable to pasture and to restrict tenants' rights to woodland. Several tenant families, despite being Puritans like Knightley, used aggressive action as well as national legal arbitration to protect their rights. The manor lands and courts were dissolved in the early 20th century.

In 1546 the rectorship and patronage of Badby and Newnham were passed to Christ Church, Oxford. It remained with Christ Church, Oxford, except for disruption by the Commonwealth, until 1919, when the Bishop of Peterborough became the patron.

=== The Root(e) family ===
The Root(e) family is listed as one of the early settlers in "A Genealogical Dictionary of the First Settlers of New England, before 1692". We often receive enquiries, especially from America about the family.

There are no monuments, gravestones nor descendants of the family that we can identify in Badby village today. The 17th century parish records record births, baptisms, marriages and burials of a few members of the family. The records are now housed at the Northamptonshire Records Office.

Below are the results of research by former resident Cristine Orr. Thomas Roote married in Milton Malsor. This Thomas had a field and house in Badby in 1597, but gave it up in 1606. His son John was born in Milton Malsor probably in 1570. Badby registers show:

- 27 July 1600 - John Roote married Ann Rushall at Badby. The Rushall name also appears as Russall and later as Russell in different entries
- 21 December 1600 - Marie, daughter of John & Ann Roote was baptized (Most records indicate her name was Mary, but the actual parish records are very illegible).
- 18 October 1603 - Susanna, daughter of John & Ann Roote was baptised
- 16 January 1605 - Thomas, son of John & Ann Roote was baptised. Thomas went to U.S.A. in 1637
- 26 February 1608 - John, son of John & Ann Roote. John also went to U.S.A. in 1637.
- 5 April 1609 - Thomas Roote was buried on 5 April 1609 in Badby.

NOTE: Arthur Louis Finnell, CGRS, of the National Huguenot Society states this about Thomas and Ann Routes (Roote)'s son: "JOHN b. 1575; m 1600 Badby, England to Mary Russell. Listed in 1598 as an alien in London." To be a bonafide Huguenot, a person must have left France after 10 Dec 1520 and before 28 Nov 1787, suggesting Thomas Routtes was born in France, likely in 1555, and fled to Badby to escape Catholic persecution.

NOTE2: The above Huguenot origins are in question. It is now being considered that Thomas was a son of Lawrence Roote of Milton Malsor and evidence to this is currently being researched.

== Notable buildings ==
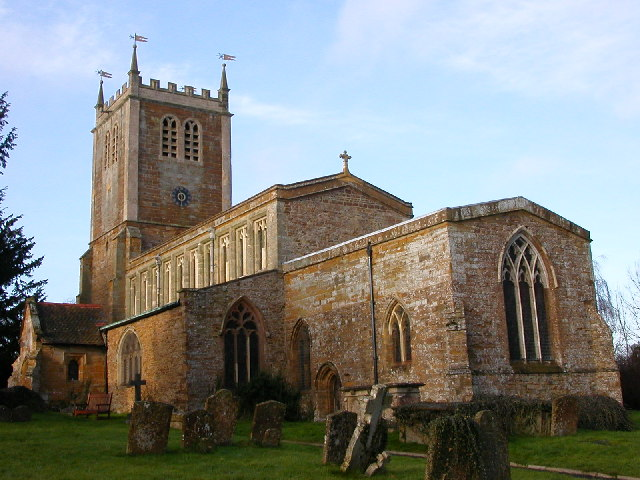
Church of St Mary the Virgin

=== St Mary's Church ===
The church, dedicated to St Mary, was mostly built in the early 14th century with a very fine continuous clerestory added in the 15th century and the tower rebuilt in 1707–09. The building was restored in 1880-81 by Edmund Francis Law and is a Grade II* listed building. The parish is part of the united benefice of The Knightley Parishes of the Church of England.

Four of the chest tombs in the churchyard were separately listed as Grade II in 1987 (English Heritage ID 360661 and 360662).

=== Badby House ===
Arms of "Watkins of Badby House, Northants": Azure, a fess vair between three leopard's faces jessant-de-lys or

Badby House> was built in 1826 by Charles William Watkins, whose arms are listed in Burke's General Armory (1884) as: Azure, a fess vair between three leopard's faces jessant-de-lys or. From 1964 Badby House had extensions carried out for use by passionist contemplative nuns, when it also became known as Our Lady of Passion Monastery. It was listed Grade II in January 1968, (English Heritage ID 360650). In 2009 the monastery additions were replaced with extensions suitable for its use as a care home, with comprehensive facilities dedicated to neurological illnesses and disorders. It now operates as Badby Park.

=== Lantern House ===
The Lantern House, an early 19th-century building so named because of its octagonal tower shape, was completely restored and extended to provide modern living accommodation in 1981–82.

=== Other houses ===
There were 29 houses listed in 1987 under the Town and Country Planning Acts as having special architectural or historic importance. Many very valuable features in other buildings went unrecorded. The core of the village was designated a Conservation Area in 1993 by Daventry District Council.

One of the 17th century cottages in the village was the only thatched youth hostel in England and Wales. After being closed in 2005, it was modernised. Originally built in 1686 in the same year as Stuart Cottage on the opposite side of the green overlooking the church, it is now a single-family residence and thatched again in 2012. The adjacent former warden's cottage was sold separately. Its old corrugated iron roof was replaced by thatch in 2009. A house in the conservation area, which had a deteriorating thatch covered with corrugated iron in the 1920-30s, was reclad with new corrugated iron sheeting in 2016, because the owners were not permitted to re-thatch using longer-lasting reed thatch instead of straw.

== Schools ==
The first school in Badby was a charity school supported by the Knightleys of Fawsley and built in 1812 from a design by Wyatt in a Gothic and cruciform shape. Baker's states that the school was erected by the Lady Mary Knightley, daughter of John Baines Esq. and niece of the Bishop of Worcester, who married Sir John Knightley in 1779.

The Lady Knightley, whose name the school bore, provided everything for the education of twelve poor girls. The six younger girls were boarded and had clothing provided, including boots, shawls and bonnets. They were known as Sir Charles' Girls and were taught chiefly domestic work by a person from the village; this included the spinning and weaving of sheets. The six older girls were taught in much the same way and were known as Lady Knightley Girls.

The older girls went to Fawsley each day to be taught by the housekeeper how to cook and clean, make beds, set tables, feed fowl, etc. They, too, were provided with all their clothes and at the age of twelve took a Labour Certificate examination. If they passed they could leave school, starting in situations with a good knowledge of household work. Otherwise, they stayed until they were fourteen. The school building was used in later years from 1870 as an infant school, supported by the Knightleys, until the County Council took over the education of the village children. It has now been listed as a building of historic interest.

The National School was started by Mrs Mary Green, second wife of the Rev. Thomas Green, who was vicar from 1816 to 1871. It was used by the older children and controlled by church managers for about sixty years.

Initially, Mrs Green gathered a number of church-going girls in the vicarage on Sunday afternoons to learn poetry and hymns. She began to teach the girls to read and write and then decided to take a cottage for the purpose. The parish had formerly kept its own poor in a workhouse opposite the vicarage, but this building was later converted into three cottages to be disposed of by the vicar at his discretion; when one of these cottages became vacant the school for girls was started.

As soon as the next cottage became vacant it was taken for a school for boys and the poor were repaid for the loss of the cottages by so much coal each year. The third cottage was finally added to the school. When repairs were needed to bring the buildings up to acceptable standards; insufficient money could be found to do these; the school was therefore closed and the present school was built by the council, opened in January 1913 on the site already used by the school children for gardening lessons and duly celebrated its centenary in 2013.

The National School building was used for Sunday school and Mothers' Union meetings for several years. A harvest festival sale was also held there until 1965. The Sunday school then moved to the church and after about 1955 the Mothers' Union meetings were held in the Lady Mary School building which had become the village hall. In 1966 the National School building was finally declared unsafe and was pulled down; the site is now used for car parking.

For some years the county council had the meadow behind the Hollies earmarked for a school playing field. When the Hollies was sold in 1965 the council purchased the field and the playing area adjacent to the 1913 building was completed in 1967.

A highlight of the school year has for many years been the Rose Day event when the elected May King and May Queen are crowned at a ceremony incorporating maypole dances.

On 1 July 2014 the school officially converted to academy status. It became part of the Innovate Multi-Academy Trust together with Weedon Bec, Woodford Halse and Kilsby Schools.

== Morris dancing ==
Up to about the mid-19th century, a number of villages in south Northamptonshire had Morris dance teams who performed each spring and early summer as part of their local customs. This ancient English tradition, considered to be very old even at the time of Elizabeth I, was common throughout the area of the Cotswolds and into Northamptonshire. The changes brought about by the enclosures, industrialisation and the railways all changed rural life dramatically. Many of the traditional Morris dance teams just stopped dancing, and their dances were forgotten and lost for ever.

Badby had a tradition of Morris dancing, and village men still danced till about the 1870s. They too broke up about then, some moving off to find work. Without new recruits, the dancing stopped. The dances of Badby might have been lost too, but about 1911 the folk song and dance collector Cecil Sharp visited the Daventry area with George Butterworth, the composer, who was a fellow collector and a dancer himself. They sought older villagers who could remember the Morris and the names of those men involved in it. The team costume was described as all white with pleated shirts with epaulettes and decorated with red, white and blue rosettes, two white silk scarves were worn crossed over shoulders to opposite waist side over the shirts. They wore bells on their legs and a "scotch" glengarry type of hat with ribbons at the back.

The dances are particularly energetic and flowing in style, with beautiful tunes. Most current Morris teams dance at least one Badby dance, usually "Beauxs of London City". The local team Moulton Morris Men have revived the whole Badby dance tradition, as they specialise in Northamptonshire Morris dances. Badby is fortunate to have such a valuable history of local folklore and its own village folk music tunes.

== Rural bus challenge ==
Bus services through the village had always been minimal and just met the demand to and from Daventry. The village is located in the unprofitable fringes between big bus company areas. United Counties Omnibus Company withdrew the remaining service in 1980 when Northamptonshire County Council withdrew financial support. After that, infrequent services were provided by K W Coaches Ltd of Daventry, a company registered on 16 December 1936 and its name was changed to Geoff Amos Coaches Ltd on 18 April 1983 upon a change of ownership and its base moved to Eydon.

The Government's Rural Bus Challenge led to the formation of the Great Central ConneXion quality bus partnership between Geoff Amos Coaches, Warwickshire, Northamptonshire and Oxfordshire County Councils. From 4 September 2000 the village was provided with a bus service better than ever experienced before when an hourly service began from Banbury via Byfield, Woodford Halse, back to Byfield, through Badby and Staverton to Daventry and thence through Braunston, HM Prison Onley and Dunchurch to Rugby railway station. The service was operated with a fleet of five new easy access yellow buses calling at a series of newly marked bus stops, many equipped with new bus shelters. Journeys to Rugby were given a service number GA01 and to Banbury GA02 (Buses in Dunchurch, Onley, Braunston and between Byfield and Woodford Halse used the same road in the same direction to both termini!). However, this distinction became blurred in later years.

The service continued until Friday 5 August 2011 when the company suddenly collapsed.

== Badby Wood ==
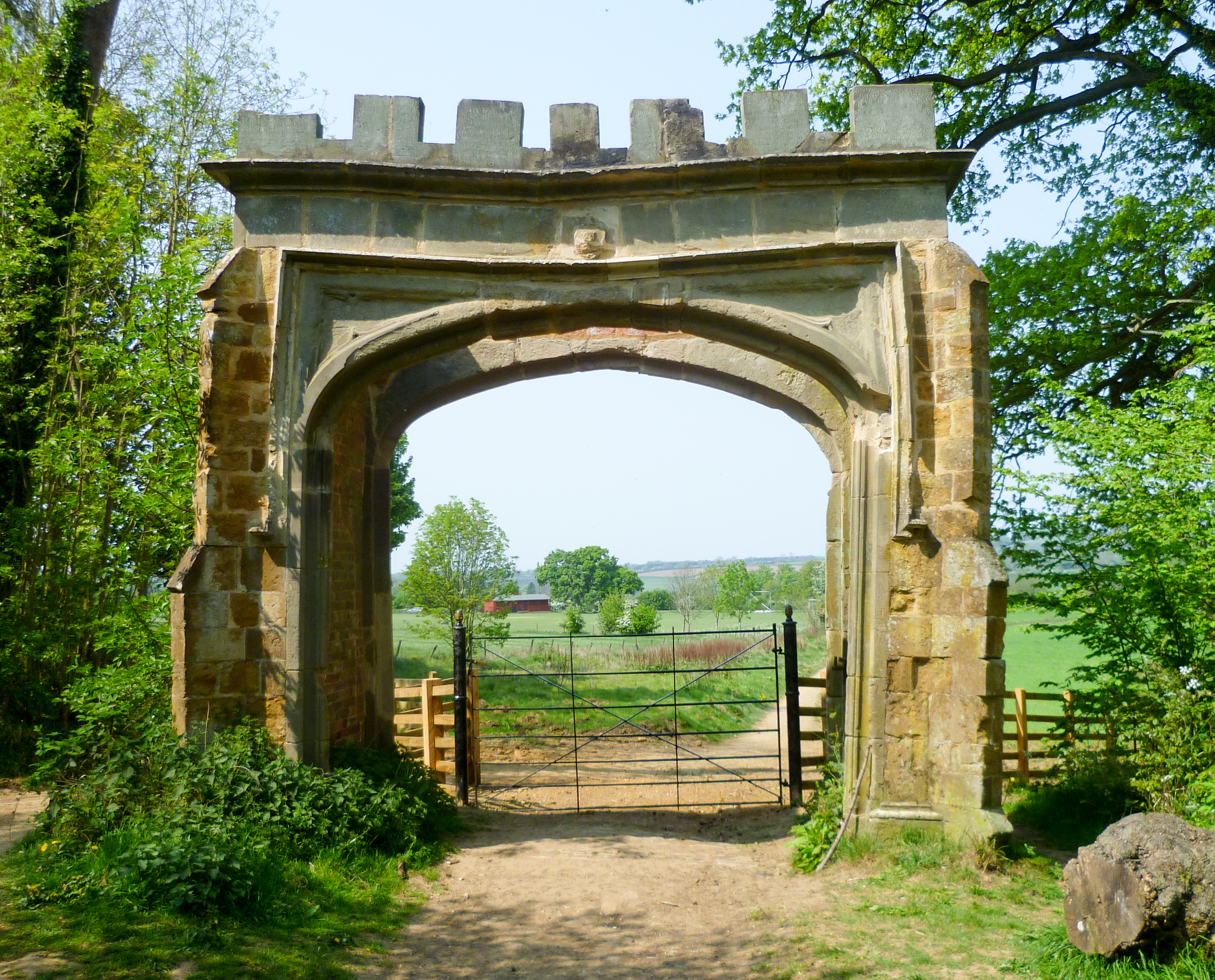
Arch Gate of Badby Wood

Badby Wood is owned by the Fawsley Estate. This estate belonged to the Knightley family from 1416 and passed through the female line to the Gage family of Firle, Sussex in 1938 when the male line died out. Most of the wood is a Site of Special Scientific Interest, and the citation states:

Badby Wood is the largest of a localised group of ancient semi-natural woodlands lying mainly on acidic soils derived from Jurassic Upper Lias Clays and Northampton Sands. It has a history of continuous woodland cover for over seven hundred years. Lowland hazel-pedunculate woodland is the most common vegetation type present, with pedunculate oak-ash-hazel occurring locally in the wetter areas. Woodland habitat of this kind has declined significantly throughout Northamptonshire and is now unusual in the county.

Early 2007 saw the start of work undertaken by Fawsley Estate under a Forestry Commission Woodland Grant Scheme Agreement, running from 2006 to 2011. Natural England was involved and supports the works undertaken. A large number of sycamore and some larch were felled and removed to allow for native species, and the edges of the rides cleared in the first stage. In the second stage, more and larger larch were removed. A ring of horse chestnut trees, marking the start of the path to the stone arch into the cherry tree avenue, declined over ten years. The last ones fell over or were felled by the end of 2008. Fawsley Estate erected new gates and fencing here in 2009.

From autumn 2014, thinning operations took place in Badby Wood to improve the health and quality of the habitat in addition to producing timber and firewood as a sustainable carbon lean product. The work represented sustainable use of the growing natural resource and demonstrated best forestry practice in woodland SSSI management. This is part of a carefully designed programme fully consulted with the Forestry Commission and Natural England and now approved within a long term Woodland Management Plan.

The thinning process removed predominantly sweet chestnut, sycamore, European larch and Scots pine and opened back around the mature oak. In areas worked no more than 20-25% of standing volume was removed. This opened areas of the canopy as appropriate to allow light penetration and thus encourage natural regeneration of tree seedlings and ground flora. Through encouraging structural diversity, a wider variety of wildlife is supported, and areas of non-SSSI woodland with high biodiversity potential improved, to fulfil this potential in the long-term. The work was specified and contracted by a Chartered Forester and was fully managed and supervised throughout. It was carried out by competent and insured forestry contractors who were aware of the ecological importance of the woodland and have good experience of working on sensitive sites. The proceeds of timber sales was invested into the long-term management of the valued woodland resource to ensure its sustainable upkeep for future generations.

== Footpaths ==
There are several off-road rights of way within the village and to nearby villages.

Knightley Way was the first of the longer off-road footpaths designated as a County Path in Northamptonshire. It was created through 12 miles of attractive countryside formerly owned by the Knightley family of Fawsley Hall. It initially joined the two Youth Hostels that existed at Badby and Greens Norton. It is the only right of way through Badby Woods and passes through Fawsley, Preston Capes, Farthingstone and Grimscote.

Nene Way is a more modern County Path extending 110 miles from Badby through Northamptonshire, Cambridgeshire and ending at Sutton Bridge in Lincolnshire. Its route is well marked.

== Arbury Hill and earthworks ==
Arbury Hill at 738 ft (225 m) is the highest point in Northamptonshire and 1 1/4 miles (2.0 km) due west of the church tower. There is a single-rampart Iron Age square-shaped Hill Fort with sides about 200 yd (180 m) long. The hill has a motocross track and is used about four times a year by local clubs.

A tumulus about 1 mile (2 km) north along the Daventry road is much spread by ploughing and is all that remains of a group which lay north of the village. .
