= Spinney Hill =

Area of Northampton, England

Coordinates: 52.260°N 0.870°W

- Location within Northamptonshire
- OS grid reference: SP772630
- Civil parish: Northampton
- Unitary authority: West Northamptonshire
- Ceremonial county: Northamptonshire
- Region: East Midlands
- Country: England
- Sovereign state: United Kingdom
- Post town: NORTHAMPTON
- Postcode district: NN3
- Dialling code: 01604
- Police: Northamptonshire
- Fire: Northamptonshire
- Ambulance: East Midlands
- UK Parliament: Northampton North

Spinney Hill is an area of Northampton, in the West Northamptonshire district, in Northamptonshire, England, to the north of the town, in the Parklands ward. It is bordered by a semi-wild park area called Bradlaugh Fields, another more traditional park, allotments and a residential area.

Amenities include shops, a pub (called "The Spinney Hill"), Northampton School for Girls, a comprehensive secondary school with academy status, and primary and nursery schools.

The Post Office has relocated to Sweet Machine on Churchill Avenue.

The population is included in the Eastfield ward of Northampton Council.

== History ==
Sir Philip Manfield (1819 -99), shoe manufacturer, had a substantial neo-Jacobean stone mansion built off Kettering Road for himself and his family between 1899 and 1902. This was originally known as Weston Favell House. James Mansfield gave the house for a hospital in 1924 and it opened as a "hospital for crippled children" in 1925. Later, it became an orthopaedic hospital for all ages, closing in 1992. The main building was converted in the early 2000s into apartments and renamed "Manfield Grange".

The Spinney Hill pub was built in 1936 by the Northampton Brewery Company. From 1937 until 1947 their tenants were Bertha Wilmott, a singing star of variety theatre and radio, and her husband Reg Seymour. At that time it was a hotel offering accommodation and a famous hotel guest in 1943 was Hollywood film star Clark Gable, while he was a captain in the US army.
