= List of places in Northamptonshire =

Some of the larger settlements of Northamptonshire.

This is a list of places in the ceremonial county of Northamptonshire, England.

== A ==
Abington – Abthorpe – Achurch – Adstone – Alderton – Aldwincle – Althorp – Apethorpe – Armston – Arthingworth – Ashby St Ledgers – Ashley – Ashton (near Oundle) – Ashton (near Towcester) – Astcote – Aston le Walls – Astrop – Astwell – Aynho

== B ==
Badby – Barby – Barby Nortoft – Barnwell – Barton Seagrave – Benefield – Billing - Blakesley – Blatherwycke – Blisworth – Boothville – Boughton – Bozeat – Brackley – Bradden – Brafield-on-the-Green – Brampton Ash – Braunston – Braybrooke – Briar Hill – Brigstock – Brington – Brixworth – Brockhall – Broughton – Bugbrooke – Bulwick – Burton Latimer – Byfield

== C ==
Caldecote – Caldecott – Canons Ashby – Carlton Purlieus – Castle Ashby – Caswell – Cattle End – Chacombe – Chadstone – Chapel Brampton – Chapel End – Charlton – Charwelton – Chelston Rise – Chelveston – Chipping Warden – Church Brampton – Church Charwelton – Church Stowe – Clay Coton – Clipston – Clopton – Cogenhoe – Cold Ashby – Cold Higham – Collingtree – Collyweston – Corby – Cosgrove – Coton – Cotterstock – Cottesbrooke – Cottingham – Cotton End – Courteenhall – Cranford St Andrew – Cranford St John – Creaton – Crick – Croughton – Crowfield – Culworth

== D ==
Dallington – Dalscote – Daventry – Deanshanger – Deene – Deenethorpe – Denford – Denton – Desborough – Dingley – Dodford – Draughton – Drayton – Duddington – Duncote – Duston

== E ==
Eaglethorpe – Earls Barton – East Carlton – East Farndon – East Haddon – Eastcote – Easton Maudit – Easton Neston – Easton-on-the-Hill – Ecton – Ecton Brook – Edgcote – Elkington – Evenley – Everdon – Eydon

== F ==
Falcutt – Far Cotton – Farthinghoe – Farthingstone – Fawsley – Finedon – Flore – Foscote – Foster's Booth – Fotheringhay – Furtho

== G ==
Gayton – Geddington – Glapthorn – Grange Park – Grafton Regis – Grafton Underwood – Great Addington – Great Billing – Great Brington – Great Cransley – Great Doddington – Great Harrowden – Great Houghton – Great Oakley – Great Oxendon – Great Purston – Greatworth – Greens Norton – Grendon – Gretton – Grimscote – Guilsborough

== H ==
Hackleton – Halse – Hanging Houghton – Hannington – Hardingstone – Hardwick – Hargrave – Harlestone – Harpole – Harrington – Harringworth – Hartwell – Haselbech – Hatton Park – Hellidon – Helmdon – Hemington – Higham Ferrers – Hinton – Hinton-in-the-Hedges – Holcot – Holdenby – Hollowell – Horton – Hulcote

== I ==
Irchester – Irthlingborough – Isham – Islip

== K ==
Kelmarsh – Kettering – Kilsby – King's Cliffe – Kings Sutton – Kingsley Park – Kingsthorpe – Kingsthorpe Hollow – Kislingbury – Knuston – Kings Heath

== L ==
Lamport – Laxton – Lilbourne – Litchborough – Little Addington – Little Billing – Little Brington – Little Cransley – Little Creaton – Little Everdon – Little Harrowden – Little Houghton – Little Irchester – Little Oakley – Little Oxendon – Loddington – Lois Weedon – Long Buckby – Long Buckby Wharf – Lower Benefield – Lower Boddington – Lower Catesby – Lower End – Lower Middleton Cheney – Lower Thorpe – Lower Weedon – Lowick – Luddington-in-the-Brook – Lutton

== M ==
Maidford – Maidwell – Marston St Lawrence – Marston Trussell – Mawsley – Mears Ashby – Middleton – Middleton Cheney – Milthorpe – Milton Malsor – Moreton Pinkney – Moulton – Murcott – Muscott

== N ==
Naseby – Nassington – Nether Heyford – New Barton – New Duston – Newbottle – Newnham – Newton – Newton Bromswold – Nobottle – Northampton – Northfield – Nortoft – Norton

== O ==
Old – Old Stratford – Onley – Orlingbury – Orton – Oundle – Overstone – Overthorpe

== P ==
Papley – Passenham – Pattishall – Paulerspury – Piddington – Pilton – Pipewell – Pitsford – Plumpton – Plumpton End – Polebrook – Polopit – Potterspury – Preston Capes – Preston Deanery – Pury End – Puxley – Pytchley

== Q ==
Queen's Park – Quinbury End – Quinton

== R ==
Radstone – Raunds – Ravensthorpe – Ringstead – Road Weedon – Roade – Rockingham – Rothersthorpe – Rothwell – Round Spinney – Rushden – Rushton

== S ==
Scaldwell – Shelfleys – Shotley – Shutlanger – Sibbertoft – Silverstone – Slapton – Slipton – Southwick – Spinney Hill – Spratton – St James's End – Stanford-on-Avon – Stanion – Stanwick – Staverton – Stoke Albany – Stoke Bruerne – Stoke Doyle – Stowe – Strixton – Sudborough – Sulby – Sulgrave – Sutton Bassett – Syresham – Sywell

== T ==
Tansor – Teeton – The Green – Thenford – Thornby – Thorpe Malsor – Thorpe Mandeville – Thorpe Underwood – Thorpe Waterville – Thrapston – Thurning – Tiffield – Titchmarsh – Towcester – Twywell

== U ==
Upper Astrop – Upper Benefield – Upper Boddington – Upper Catesby – Upper Stowe – Upper Weedon – Upton

== W ==
Wadenhoe – Wakerley – Walgrave – Walton Grounds – Wappenham – Warkton – Warkworth – Warmington – Warmonds Hill – Watford – Watford Gap – Weedon – Weedon Lois – Weekley – Weldon – Welford – Wellingborough – Welton – West Farndon – West Haddon – Westhorp – Weston – Weston by Welland – Weston Favell – Whilton – Whiston – White Hills – Whitfield – Whittlebury – Wicken – Wigsthorpe – Wilbarston – Wilby – Winwick – Wollaston – Wood Burcote – Woodend – Woodford – Woodford Halse – Woodnewton – Woodwell – Wootton

== Y ==
Yardley Gobion – Yardley Hastings – Yarwell – Yelvertoft

== See also ==
- Category:Villages in Northamptonshire
- List of places in England
