= Campion School, Bugbrooke =

Campion School

Location
- Kislingbury Road, Bugbrooke; Northampton, Northamptonshire, NN7 3QG; England; 52.213°N 1.006°W

Information
- Type: Academy
- Established: 1967
- Founder: Jason Burrows
- Specialist: Language College
- Department for Education URN: 137087 Tables
- Ofsted: Reports
- Head Teacher: Patricia Hammond
- Staff: 90
- Gender: Mixed
- Age: 11 to 19
- Enrolment: 1397
- Houses: Ash, Beech, Cedar, Maple, Oak, Rowan, Sycamore, Willow
- Colour: Campion green
- Website: http://www.campion.northants.sch.uk

Campion School is a co-educational secondary school in Bugbrooke, about 6 miles (10 km) from Northampton, Northamptonshire. Founded in 1969, it became a Language College in September 1997, and in 2011 the school became an academy. The school had 1397 students on roll for the 2014-2015 school year, with 71 teaching staff and 19 teaching assistants. In 2020 the school had 1738 students on roll, 69 Teaching staff and 21 teaching assistants. On 1 September 2023, Campion School & Language College became part of the United Learning Trust.

== History ==
The original buildings were built from 1966 to 1968 by the county architect's department and it was the first purpose-built comprehensive school in Northamptonshire. Extensions were added in 1971-2.

== Performance and achievement ==
The school's latest full Ofsted inspection was in 2018, when the school was found to be "insufficient" in all areas, except for the sixth form. A section 8 report in 2015 which focused on the progress of disadvantaged students (the main weakness in the previous report) showed mixed results.

=== GCSE achievement (English and Maths) ===
Year	% A*-C	% 9-5	% 9-4
2011	69		
2012	70		
2013	78		
2014	54		
2015	61		
2016			
2017		50	72
2018		45	68
2019		46	73

== Catchment area ==
The following are among the school's current catchment area:

- Bugbrooke
- Harpole
- Kislingbury
- Flore
- Great Brington
- Little Brington
- Nobottle
- Whilton
- Cold Higham
- Grimscote
- Weedon
- Gayton
- Pattishall
- Rothersthorpe
- Milton Malsor
- Dalscote
- Astcote
- Eastcote, Northamptonshire
- Upton

Nether Heyford

== Notable former pupils ==
- Trevor Lock, comedian and playwright.
- Tom MacRae, TV and film and playwright
- Jo Whiley, BBC Radio 2 presenter.
- Dan Gilkes, speedway rider
