= Aston le Walls =

Village in Northamptonshire, England

Coordinates: 52.1551°N 1.2750°W

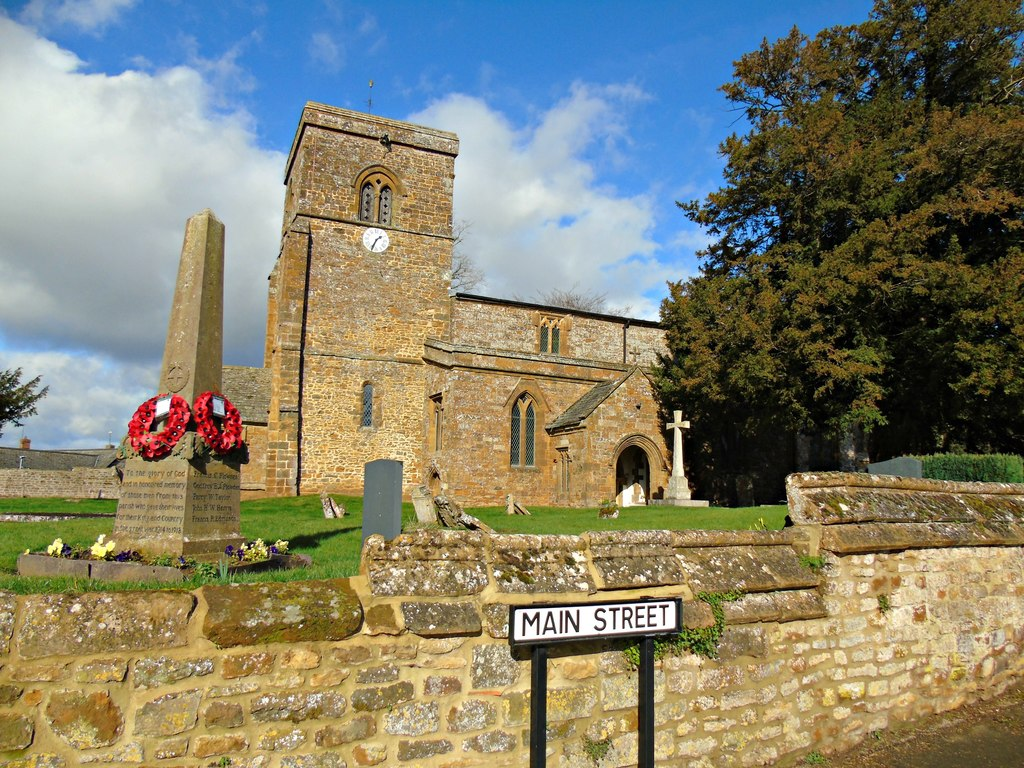
- Church and war memorial

- Location within Northamptonshire
- Population: 334 (2001 census); 293 (2011 census)
- OS grid reference: SP497510
  - London: 72 miles (115.9 km)
- Unitary authority: West Northamptonshire
- Ceremonial county: Northamptonshire
- Region: East Midlands
- Country: England
- Sovereign state: United Kingdom
- Post town: Daventry
- Postcode district: NN11
- Dialling code: 01295
- Police: Northamptonshire
- Fire: Northamptonshire
- Ambulance: East Midlands
- UK Parliament: Daventry

Aston le Walls is a village and civil parish in West Northamptonshire, England, close by the border with Oxfordshire. The village is about 9 miles (14.5 km) north of Banbury in Oxfordshire, and 10 miles (16.1 km) south of Daventry. Neighbouring villages are Chipping Warden, Lower Boddington Upper Boddington and Byfield. According to the 2001 census the village had a population of 334 falling to 293 at the 2011 census.

== History ==
The villages name means 'eastern farm/settlement'. 'The Walls' refers to the local earthworks of uncertain date and provenance.

The village is listed in 1086 as being within the Hundred of Warden. By the late 1800s, the hundred had annexed nearby hundreds and been renamed the Hundred of Chipping Warden.

=== Buildings ===
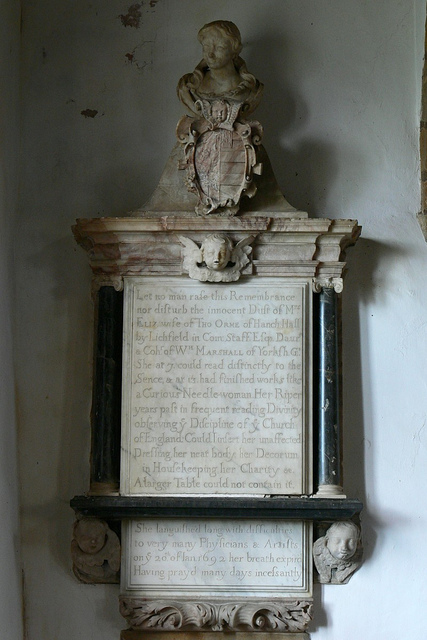
Elizabeth Orme memorial

The Anglican church is dedicated to St Leonard and dates from the 13th century and was restored in the 1870s.

There is a Roman Catholic church dedicated to the Sacred Heart and Our Lady dated 1827.

The Manor House is ca 1700.

Washbrook Farm, is an equestrian eventing centre.
