= Boddington Meadow =

Nature reserve in United Kingdom

Coordinates: 52.174°N 1.28°W

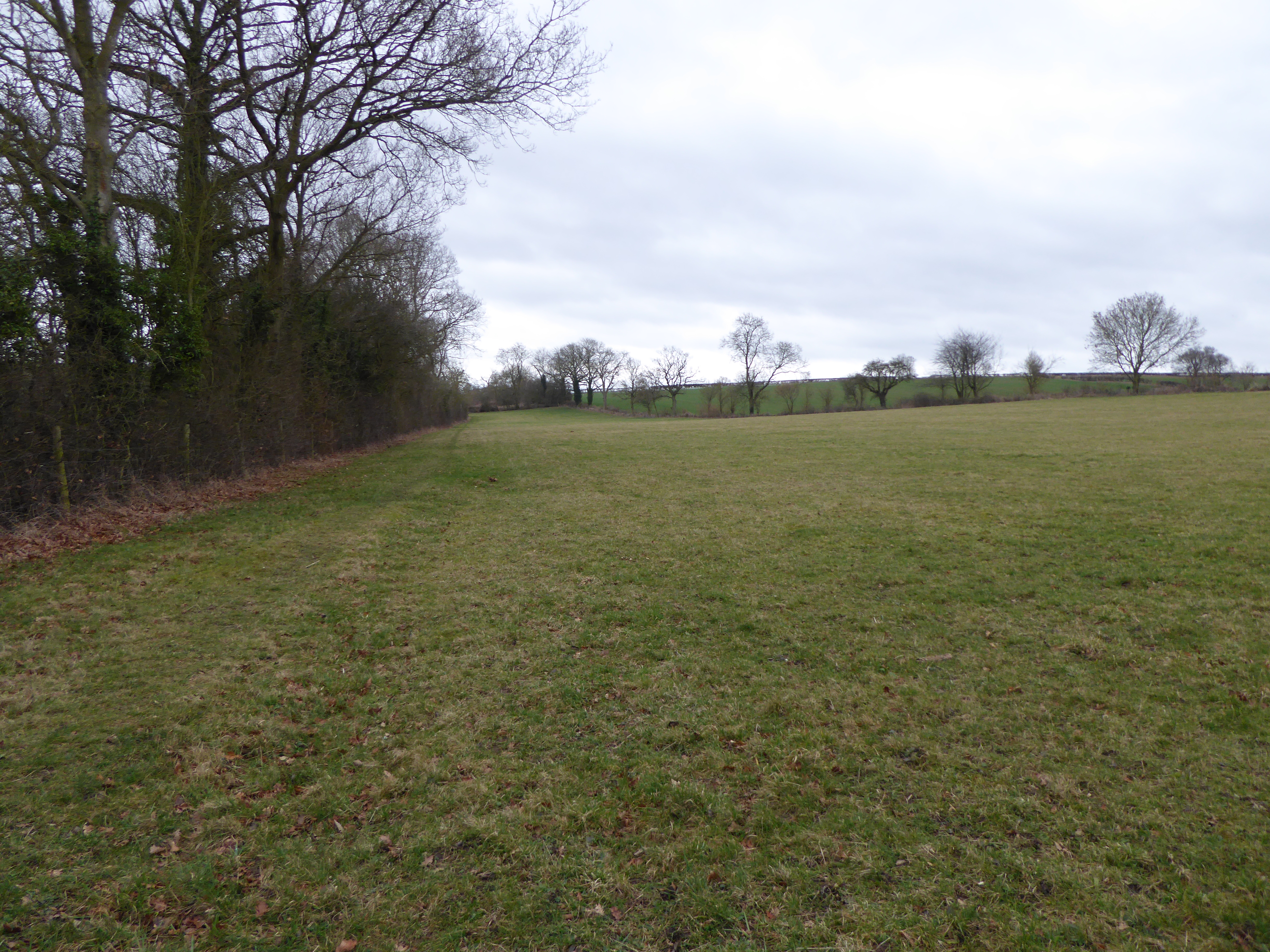
- Interactive map of Boddington Meadow
- Type: Nature reserve
- Location: Upper Boddington, Northamptonshire
- OS grid: SP 494 531
- Area: 2.3 hectares (5.7 acres)
- Manager: Wildlife Trust for Bedfordshire, Cambridgeshire and Northamptonshire

Boddington Meadow is a 2.3-hectare (5.7-acre) nature reserve east of Upper Boddington in Northamptonshire. It is managed by the Wildlife Trust for Bedfordshire, Cambridgeshire and Northamptonshire.

This meadow has never been ploughed and it is managed in a traditional way to encourage uncommon plants, such as great burnet and pepper-saxifrage. There are amphibians including frogs and toads, and butterflies including meadow browns, orange-tips, peacocks, ringlets and small tortoiseshells.

There is access from the west side of the Boddington Reservoir, between Upper Boddington and Byfield.
