= Cold Higham =

Village and civil parish in Northamptonshire, England

Coordinates: 52.1759°N 1.0436°W

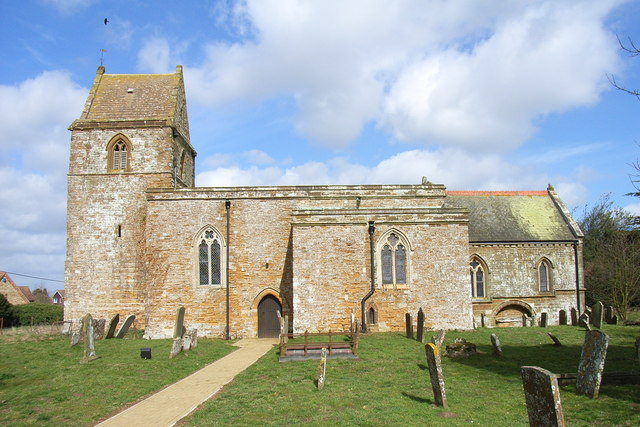
- St Luke's, Cold Higham

- Location within Northamptonshire
- Population: 290 (2011 census)
- OS grid reference: SP6553
  - London: 71 miles (114 km)
- Unitary authority: West Northamptonshire
- Ceremonial county: Northamptonshire
- Region: East Midlands
- Country: England
- Sovereign state: United Kingdom
- Post town: Towcester
- Postcode district: NN12
- Dialling code: 01327
- Police: Northamptonshire
- Fire: Northamptonshire
- Ambulance: East Midlands
- UK Parliament: South Northamptonshire

Cold Higham is a village and civil parish in Northamptonshire, England. Cold Higham Parish, also includes Fosters Booth (West), Grimscote, and Potcote. It is adjacent to Weedon Bec, Pattishall, Eastcote and Astcote. The A5 runs along the eastern boundary of the parish, along the route of Watling Street, a former Roman road. The parish had a population of 289 at the time of the 2001 census (the 2010 estimated population is 321: 80 in Cold Higham, 241 in Grimscote). The civil parish population had risen to 290 at the 2011 census.

The villages name means 'High homestead/village' or 'high hemmed-in land'. 'Cold' for its exposed situation. The village of Grimscote, which is in this parish, means "Grim's Cott", Grim being another name for Woden. One branch of the Higham family has been associated with the village. Thomas Higham is referred to as Squire in the early to mid 18th century. Both Edward Higham the Australian Politician and Tim Higham, also known as Tim FitzHigham are from this branch of the family.
