= Lower Boddington =

Village in Northamptonshire, England

Coordinates: 52.168°N 1.299°W

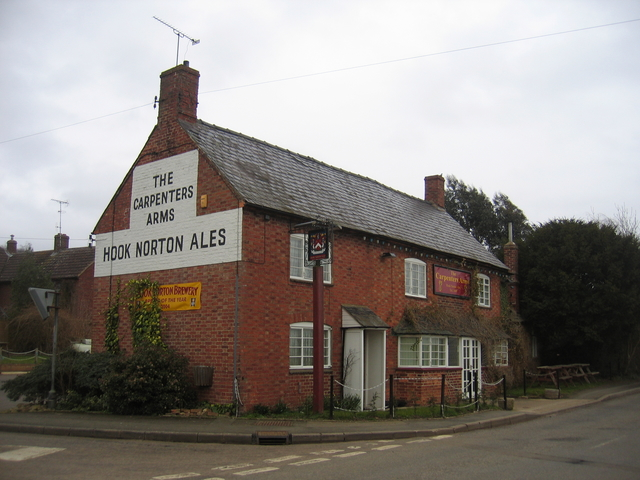
- The Carpenter's Arms

- Location within Northamptonshire
- OS grid reference: SP4852
- Civil parish: Boddington
- Unitary authority: West Northamptonshire
- Ceremonial county: Northamptonshire
- Region: East Midlands
- Country: England
- Sovereign state: United Kingdom
- Post town: Daventry
- Postcode district: NN11
- Dialling code: 01327
- Police: Northamptonshire
- Fire: Northamptonshire
- Ambulance: East Midlands
- UK Parliament: Daventry

Lower Boddington is a village and former civil parish, now in the parish of Boddington, in the West Northamptonshire district, in the ceremonial county of Northamptonshire, England. Lower Boddington is the smaller of the two villages in Boddington parish, most of whose facilities are located in Upper Boddington. It is about 8.5 miles (13.7 km) southwest of Daventry. In 1931 the parish had a population of 127. On 1 April 1935 the parish was abolished and merged with Upper Boddington to form "Boddington".

The villages name means 'Bota's hill'.

Children from Lower Boddington are most likely to attend a primary school in Aston le Walls, Chipping Warden, Leamington Spa or Upper Boddington. Teenagers are likely to attend Chenderit School, Southam College, Princethorpe College or Blesséd George Napier RC School in nearby Banbury.

Lower Boddington has a public house, the Carpenters Arms, owned by the Hook Norton Brewery.

== HS2 ==
The UK government plans to build a second high-speed railway going from Birmingham to London, Lower Boddington is one of the villages whose residents have complained about the noise pollution the railway would create and the lowering of house prices it would cause. Many posters and slogans have been put up in protest of the railway in the village and surrounding area, like many other towns and villages along the new line.
