= Pollie Hirst Simpson =

English charity organiser and agricultural advisor (1871–1947)

Pollie Hirst Simpson MBE
- Born: 23 April 1871; Royal Tunbridge Wells, Kent, England
- Died: 31 October 1947 (aged 76); Chelveston, Northamptonshire, England
- Organization: Women's Institute (WI)

Mary "Pollie" Helen Hirst Simpson (22 April 1871 – 31 October 1947) was an English sportswoman, charity organiser and the first agricultural adviser to the National Federation of Women's Institutes (WI).

== Early life ==
Simpson was born in 1871 in Royal Tunbridge Wells, Kent, and was the oldest of eight children. She was proud that her date of birth, 23 April, was Saint George's Day. Her parents were William Hirst Simpson (1847–1921) and Helen Simpson née Clark (1848–1892), and her mother deid when Simpson was 19 years old. Both of her grandfathers were Anglican rectors.

Simpson was educated at home by a governess. She excelled at sports, played tennis for Northamptonshire county in 1898 and was captain of the Higham Ferrers Ladies Hockey club.

== World War I ==
During the World War I, Simpson served as organizing secretary of the Women’s Branch of the Board of Agriculture and Fisheries and as Assistant Secretary of the Soldiers' and Sailors' Families Association. She was appointed MBE for her civilian war service in 1919. She also served as secretary of the Northamptonshire Nursing Association from 1919 to 1920 and was active on the local Parish council.

== Women's Institute ==
In 1920, Simpson became the Midland Area federation organiser of the Women's Institute at the invitation of Gertrude Denman, Baroness Denman. In 1921 she was the founding president of the Chelveston WI branch, Northamptonshire. By 1925, she had been recruited as the WI's first national agricultural adviser. On her retirement in 1945, Denman reflected that "We shall always remember her with affection and gratitude. By her gallant work and devotion to the Institutes she has made a very special place for herself in the history of the Organisation".

== Death and legacy ==
She died in Chelveston in 1947 of a cerebral thrombosis and arteriosclerosis. She was buried at the parish church of St John the Baptist in Chelveston, alongside other members of the Simpson family. After she died the local WI rented a room in a cottage, which they decorated with portraits of Simpson and Denman.
