= Upper Cherwell at Trafford House =

Coordinates: 52.135°N 1.229°W

- Site of Special Scientific Interest
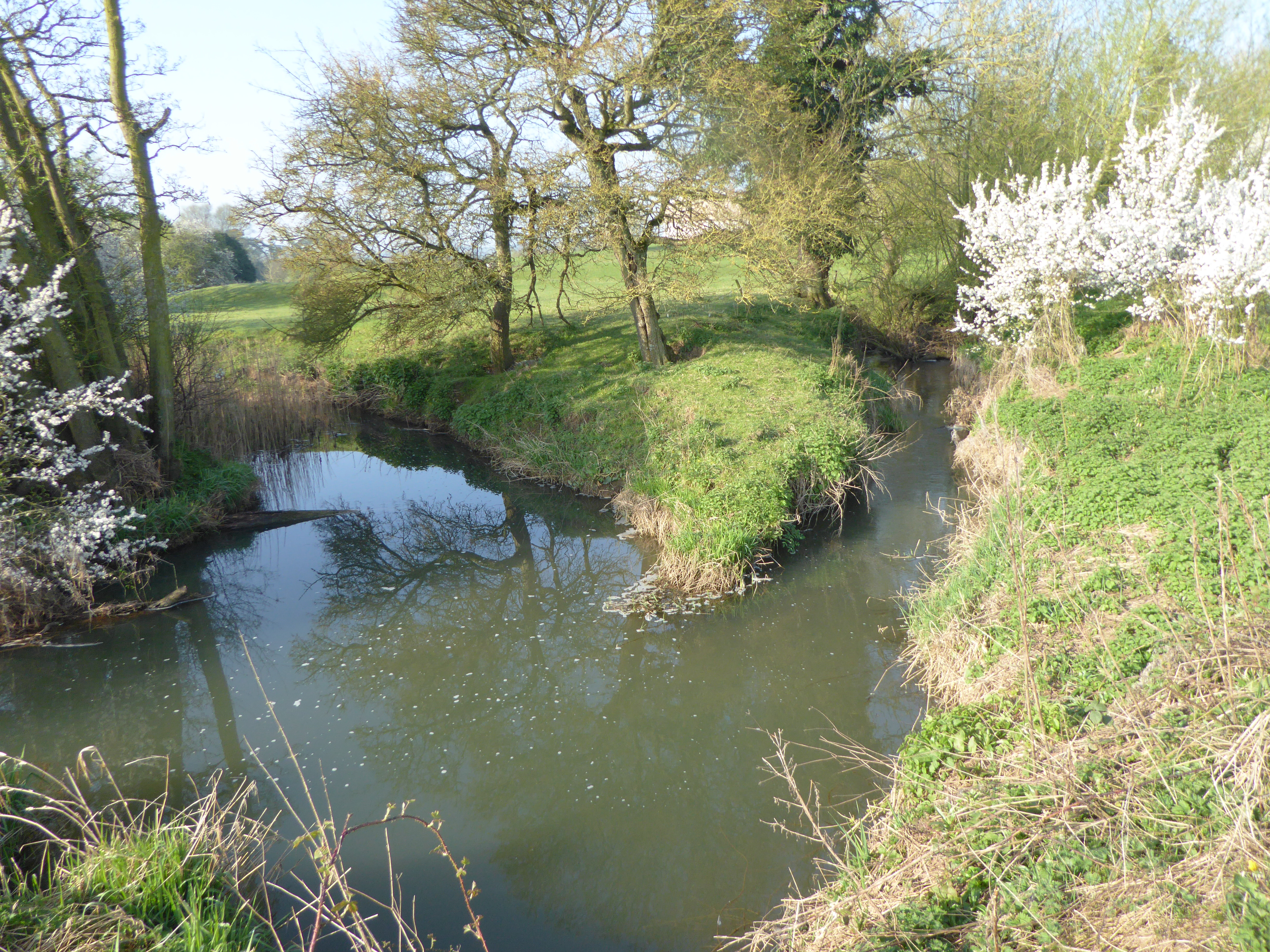
- Location of Upper Cherwell at Trafford House.
- Area of search: Northamptonshire
- Grid reference: SP 528 488
- Interest: Geological
- Area: 18.5 hectares
- Notification date: 1992
- Location map: Magic Map

Upper Cherwell at Trafford House is an 18.5-hectare (46-acre) geological Site of Special Scientific Interest between Chipping Warden and Eydon in Northamptonshire. It is a Geological Conservation Review site.

This site is at the confluence of the River Cherwell and Eydon Brook. They are underfit streams, which have channels are small for the size of their valleys. According to Natural England, the site has played an important role in the development of the theory of underfit streams. Deposits in a paleochannel could enable reconstruction of the environmental history.

There is access from a public footpath through the site from Welsh Road.
