= Boddington, Northamptonshire =

Civil parish in Northamptonshire, England

Coordinates: 52.169°N 1.307°W

Boddington
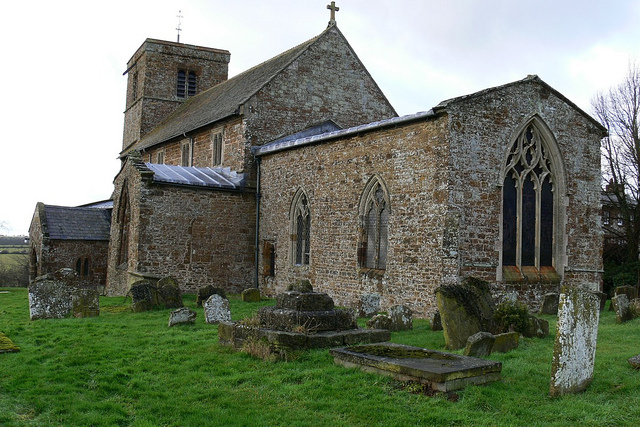
- St. John the Baptist parish church, Upper Boddington

- Location within Northamptonshire
- Population: 700 (2011)
- OS grid reference: SP4752
  - London: 67 miles (108 km)
- Civil parish: Boddington
- Unitary authority: West Northamptonshire
- Ceremonial county: Northamptonshire
- Region: East Midlands
- Country: England
- Sovereign state: United Kingdom
- Post town: Daventry
- Postcode district: NN11
- Dialling code: 01327
- Police: Northamptonshire
- Fire: Northamptonshire
- Ambulance: East Midlands
- UK Parliament: Daventry
- Website: The Boddingtons

Boddington is a civil parish in West Northamptonshire, England, about 5 miles (8 km) north-east of Banbury off the A361 road.

The parish includes the villages of Upper Boddington and Lower Boddington. Upper Boddington is the larger of the two, on a hill close to the boundary between Northamptonshire, Oxfordshire and Warwickshire, with Lower Boddington on the southern slope of the hill. Nearby Boddington Reservoir is used for sailing and recreational fishing.

== Demographics ==
According to the 2001 census it had a population of 700, 240 male, 252 female in 196 households (2010 estimate 722, 280 in Lower Boddington and 442 in upper Boddington).

== History ==
Boddington was almost certainly founded in Anglo-Saxon times. The spelling of Boddington has changed over the centuries. In the Domesday Book it is given as Botendon. A survey of Northamptonshire from the 12th century gives the name as Bottelendon, while The Calendar of Close Rolls from 1244 states the name as Budinton. Documents from 1358, 1396 and 1428 give the names as Botyngdon, Botyndoun and Botyngdon respectively. Some 19th-century maps name the parish Bodington, with only one "d". Ideas concerning the origin of the name vary greatly; the Oxford Dictionary of English Place-names says that it is derived from "The hill of a man called Bota".

The two villages of Upper and Lower Boddington may have been separate in their early history, but were officially merged into a single parish by an Act of Parliament in 1758. The population of the village can be traced back through the national censuses as far back as 1801. In the 19th century, the population appears to have fluctuated considerably, rising from 476 in 1801 to 926 in 1851, then declining to 487 by 1901. The 2001 census gives the population of the parish as 700.

In 1870, following the passing of the first Education Act, the Rev. Edward Sale began an effort to build a local school. Boddington C of E Primary school was built on church land at a cost of £718. The school remains in use today, with recent extension work providing it with modern sports and information technology facilities.

== Buildings ==
During World War I the parish hosted Belgian refugees. During World War II, on 25 November 1944, a Vickers Wellington bomber crashed into the Manor House, killing three people in the house and the seven crew of the plane, and severely damaging the upper storey of the building. The house has only recently been re-roofed.

The parish contains many old, listed buildings. Opinions vary as to which house is the oldest in the village. Some of the more recent books on the village claim that Cherry Tree House is the oldest, though, architecturally, the house appears to be approximately the same age as Stoneleigh Farm, situated opposite it, and the Plough Inn.

== Church and chapel ==
The Church of England parish church of Saint John the Baptist in Upper Boddington includes two tomb recesses dating from about 1300. The chancel windows and the south window of the south transept are Decorated Gothic. The west tower is Perpendicular Gothic and the south porch was added in 1629.

North of St. John's is the Old Rectory, which was built in 1680 and had a third storey added in the 19th century. It is an ironstone building of five bays.

Upper Boddington had a Methodist chapel that was built in 1865.

== Amenities ==
The parish has a number of community facilities and businesses, mostly in Upper Boddington. The church, the Methodist Chapel, Post Office, the Plough Inn, a new village hall and a primary school described as "good, with outstanding features." The Village Garage, specialising in classic cars, opened in 2007. A photographic studio and a web design company are also in the garage building.

Boddington Reservoir is used for local and competition fishing and is also the base of Banbury Sailing Club. Local activities range from darts and skittles leagues at the Plough Inn, badminton matches and annual quizzes at the Village Hall, a 6-a-side football team playing in Napton and a classic car get-together every first Sunday of the month at the Village Garage.
