= Chelveston cum Caldecott =

Civil parish in Northamptonshire, England

Coordinates: 52.31°N 0.55°W

Chelveston cum Caldecott is a civil parish forming part of North Northamptonshire. The population of the civil parish at the 2011 census was 566. Its principal settlements are Caldecott, Chelveston and Chelston Rise.
