= Caldecott, Northamptonshire =

Hamlet in Northamptonshire, England

Coordinates: 52.3093°N 0.5508°W

Caldecott
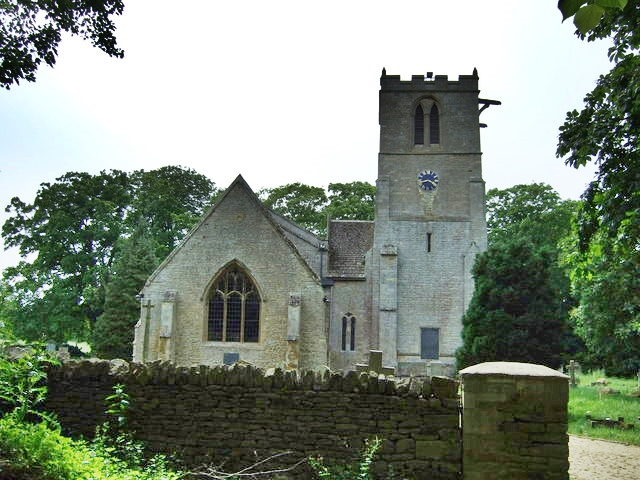
- Parish church of St John the Baptist

- Location within Northamptonshire
- OS grid reference: SP989689
- Civil parish: Chelveston cum Caldecott
- Unitary authority: North Northamptonshire
- Ceremonial county: Northamptonshire
- Region: East Midlands
- Country: England
- Sovereign state: United Kingdom
- Post town: Wellingborough
- Postcode district: NN9
- Dialling code: 01933
- Police: Northamptonshire
- Fire: Northamptonshire
- Ambulance: East Midlands
- UK Parliament: Wellingborough
- Website: Chelveston-cum-Caldecott Parish Council

Caldecott is a hamlet in the North Northamptonshire, England, about 2 miles (3 km) east of the centre of Rushden and 2 1/2 miles (4 km) south of Raunds. Caldecott is in the civil parish of Chelveston cum Caldecott, less than 1/2 mile (800 m) south of Chelveston.

The villages name means 'Cold cottages'

== Parish Church ==
The Church of England parish church of St John the Baptist is in Caldecott Road between Caldecott and Chelveston. The earliest parts of the church are 13th-century, including the north tower. Part of the chancel is 14th-century. The south porch was built in 1635. The arcades were rebuilt and the north aisle added in 1849–50 to designs by the architect E. F. Law. The church is a Grade II* listed building.

The north tower has a ring of five bells, but currently they are unringable. Accordingly a new electronic bell sound system was installed in 2012.

== Church Bells ==
Henry Penn of Peterborough cast the second and tenor bells in 1727. Thomas I Eayre of Kettering cast the treble bell in 1744. Robert Taylor of Loughborough cast the third and fourth bells in 1819.

== Bibliography ==
- Pevsner, Nikolaus; Cherry, Bridget (revision) (1973) [1961]. Northamptonshire. The Buildings of England (2nd ed.). Harmondsworth: Penguin Books. p. 148. ISBN 0-14-071022-1.
