= Dan Gilkes =

English speedway rider

- Born: 21 May 2002 (age 24); Northampton, England
- Nationality: British (English)

Career history

Great Britain
- 2019, 2021: Kent Kings/Royals
- 2022: Belle Vue Colts
- 2022–2023: Plymouth Gladiators
- 2022: Peterborough Panthers
- 2023–2024: Sheffield Tigers
- 2024: Redcar Bears
- 2025: Oxford Cheetahs
- 2025: Leicester Lions

Poland
- 2023–2024: Piła

Team honours
- 2023: SGB Premiership
- 2024: Knockout Cup

Daniel Gilkes (born 21 May 2002) is a motorcycle speedway rider from England.

== Career ==
Gilkes was still a pupil at Campion School, Bugbrooke when he started racing.

In 2019, Gilkes signed for the Kent Kings for the 2019 National Development League speedway season, helping them to National Trophy success. He was crowned the supporters rider of the year.

Unable to ride during 2020 because of the COVID-19 cancelled season, Gilkes continued to ride for Kent in 2021 but appeared in both the NDL and the higher league of the SGB Championship 2021.

In 2022, Gilkes signed for Plymouth Gladiators and his form was so impressive that he was added to the Peterborough Panthers squad in the SGB Premiership 2022 (the highest league in Britain).

Gilkes started the 2022 campaign in very good form but his season ended early when he crashed and suffered serious injuries that included five broken ribs, a broken and displaced humorous bone and a collapsed lung.

In 2023, Gilkes re-signed for Plymouth for the SGB Championship 2023 and also signed for Sheffield Tigers for the SGB Premiership 2023, as their rising star. He helped Sheffield win the league title. In 2024 he re-signed for Sheffield, and won the Knockout Cup with the Tigers.

Gilkes signed for Oxford Cheetahs for the SGB Championship 2025 and then was brought in for the Leicester Lions to race in the Premiership.
