= Dalscote =

Village in Northamptonshire, England

Coordinates: 52.180945°N 0.998632°W

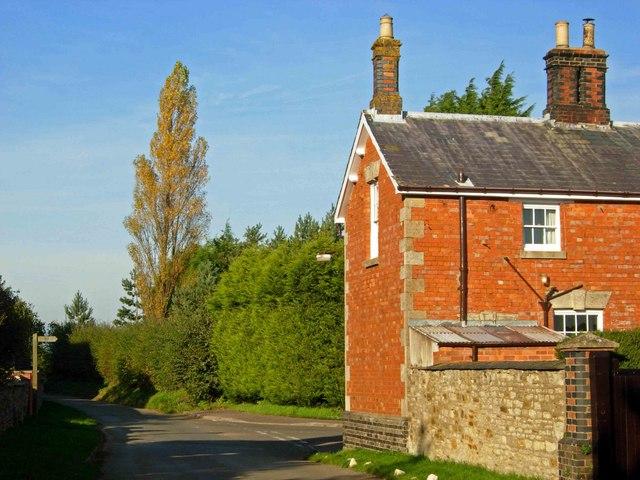

- Location within Northamptonshire
- OS grid reference: SP685541
- Unitary authority: West Northamptonshire
- Ceremonial county: Northamptonshire
- Region: East Midlands
- Country: England
- Sovereign state: United Kingdom
- Post town: Towcester
- Postcode district: NN12
- Dialling code: 01327
- Police: Northamptonshire
- Fire: Northamptonshire
- Ambulance: East Midlands
- UK Parliament: Daventry

Dalscote is a small village in West Northamptonshire, England. It is north of Towcester and between Gayton and Eastcote. There is a car-body repair workshop there but no other amenities. It is in the civil parish of Pattishall .
