= Edmund Francis Law =

British architect

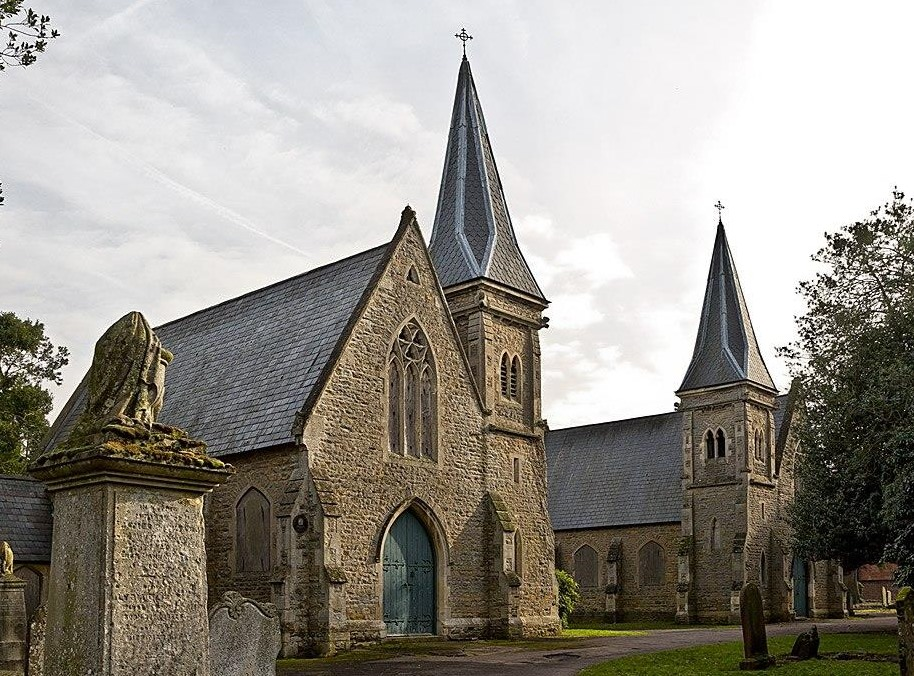
Wellingborough Church of England mortuary chapel (c.1857–58). Grade II listed

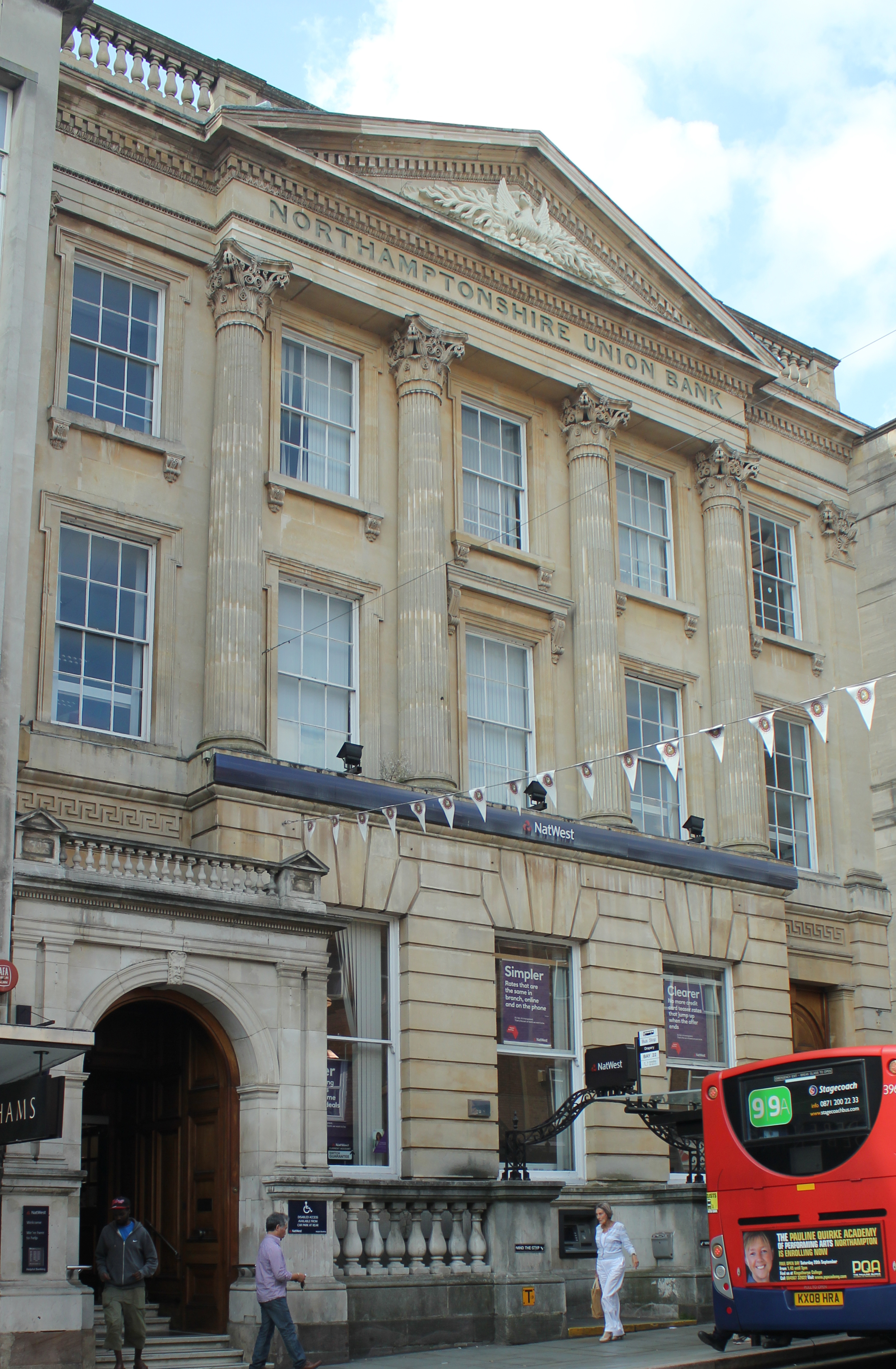
Exterior of NatWest Bank, Northampton (c. 1841)

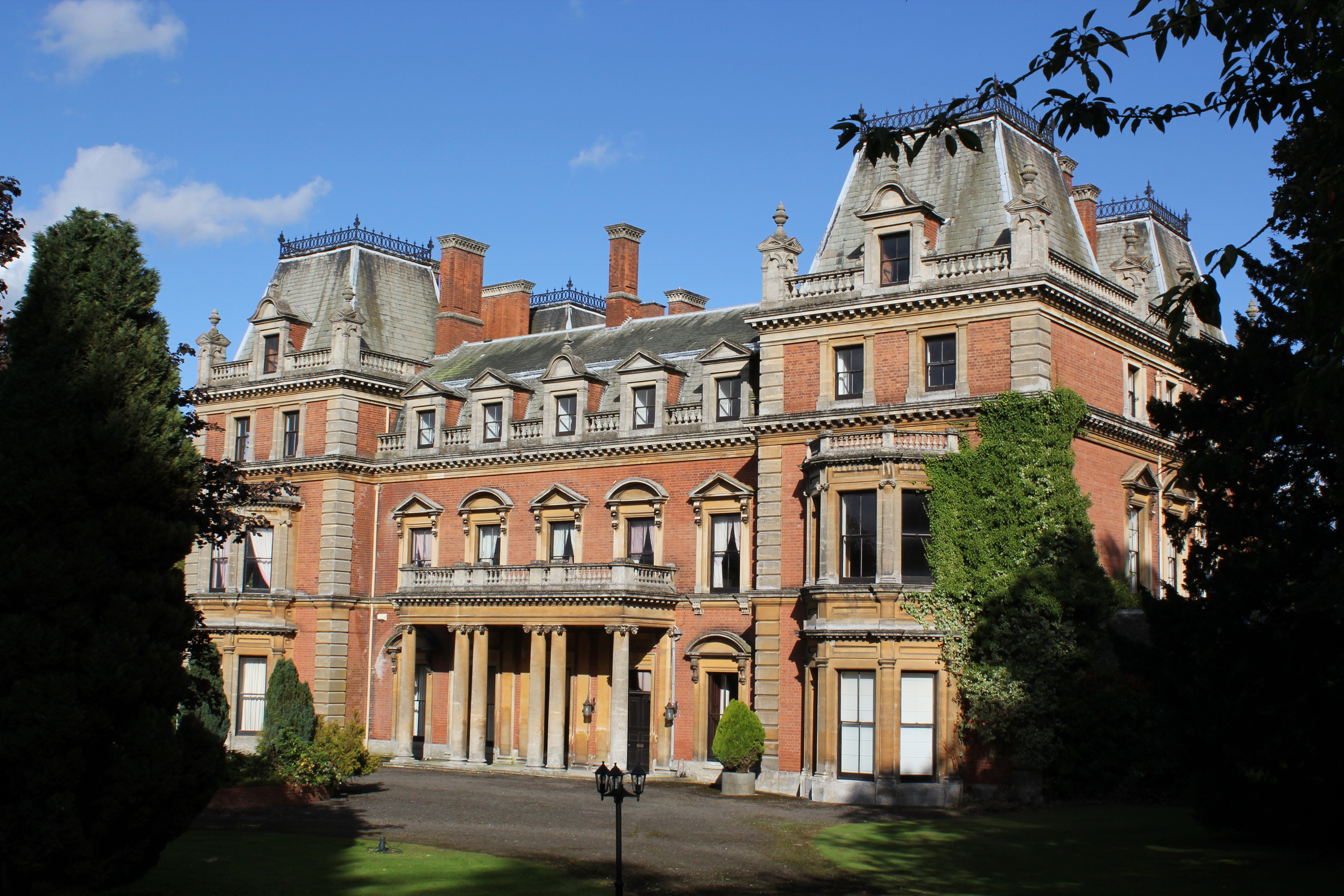
East Carlton Hall

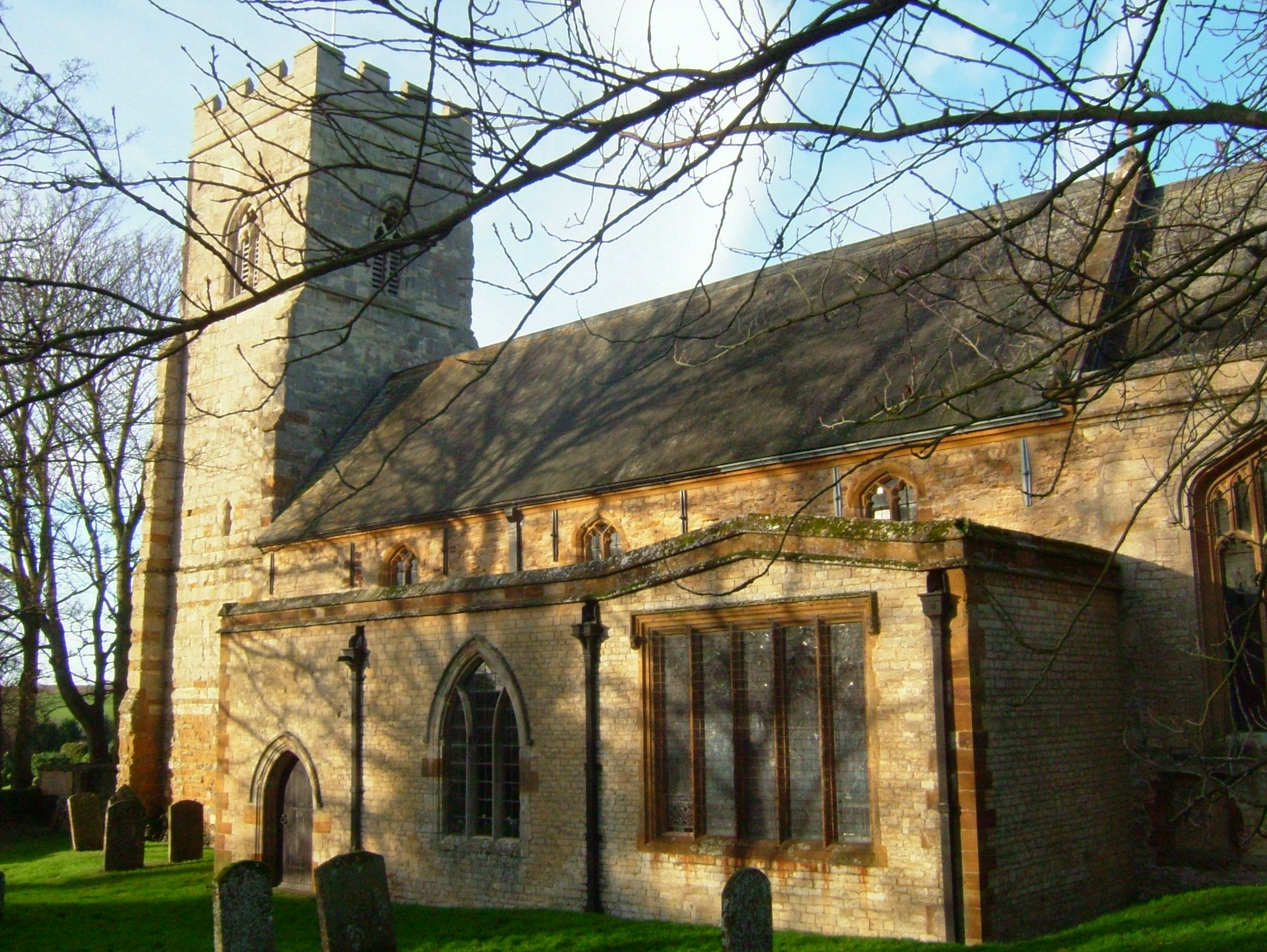
St John the Baptist church in Blisworth, Northants

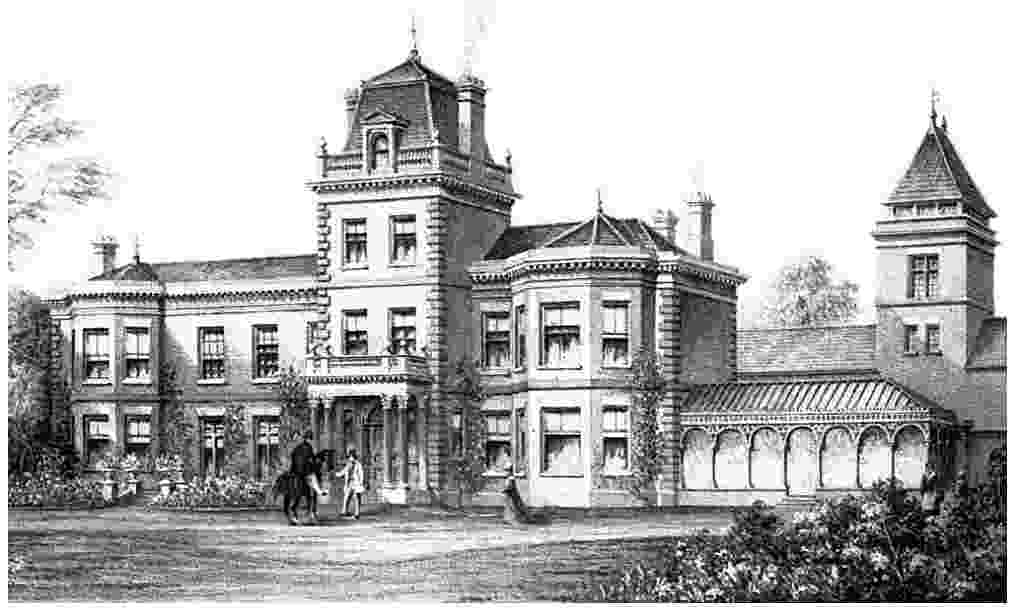
Collingtree Grange, 1865, demolished 1960s except lodges, qv

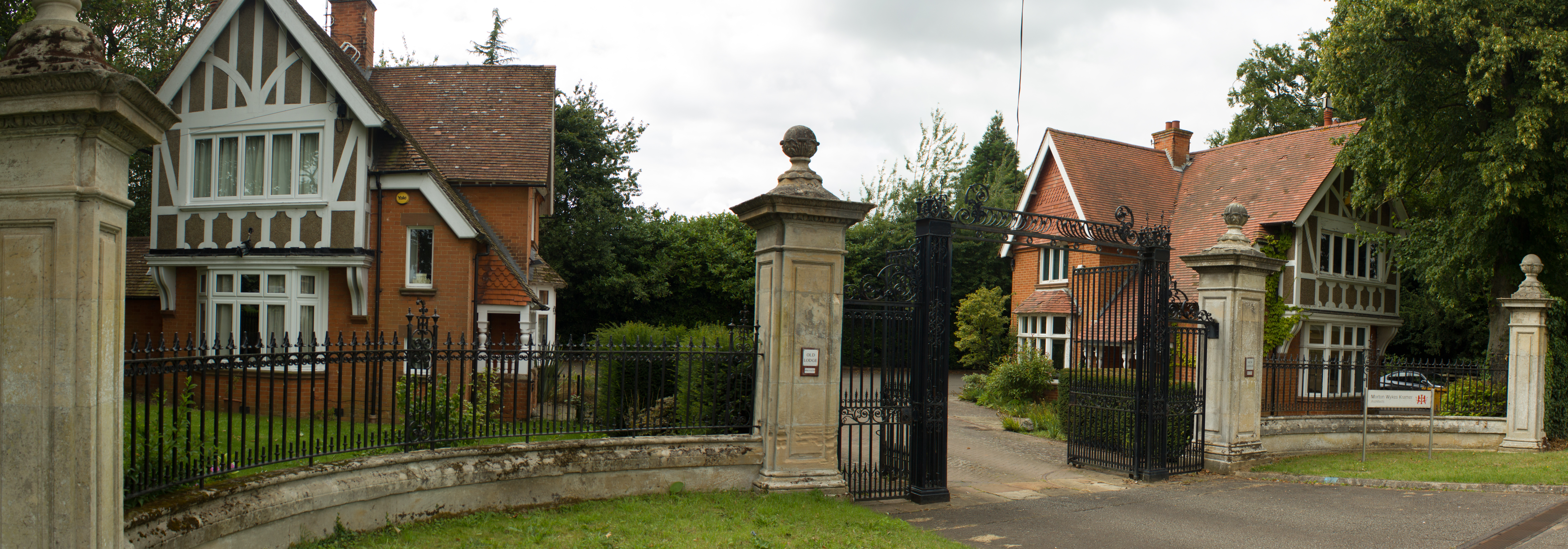
All that remains of Collingtree Grange – two lodges at the entrance from the A45 road

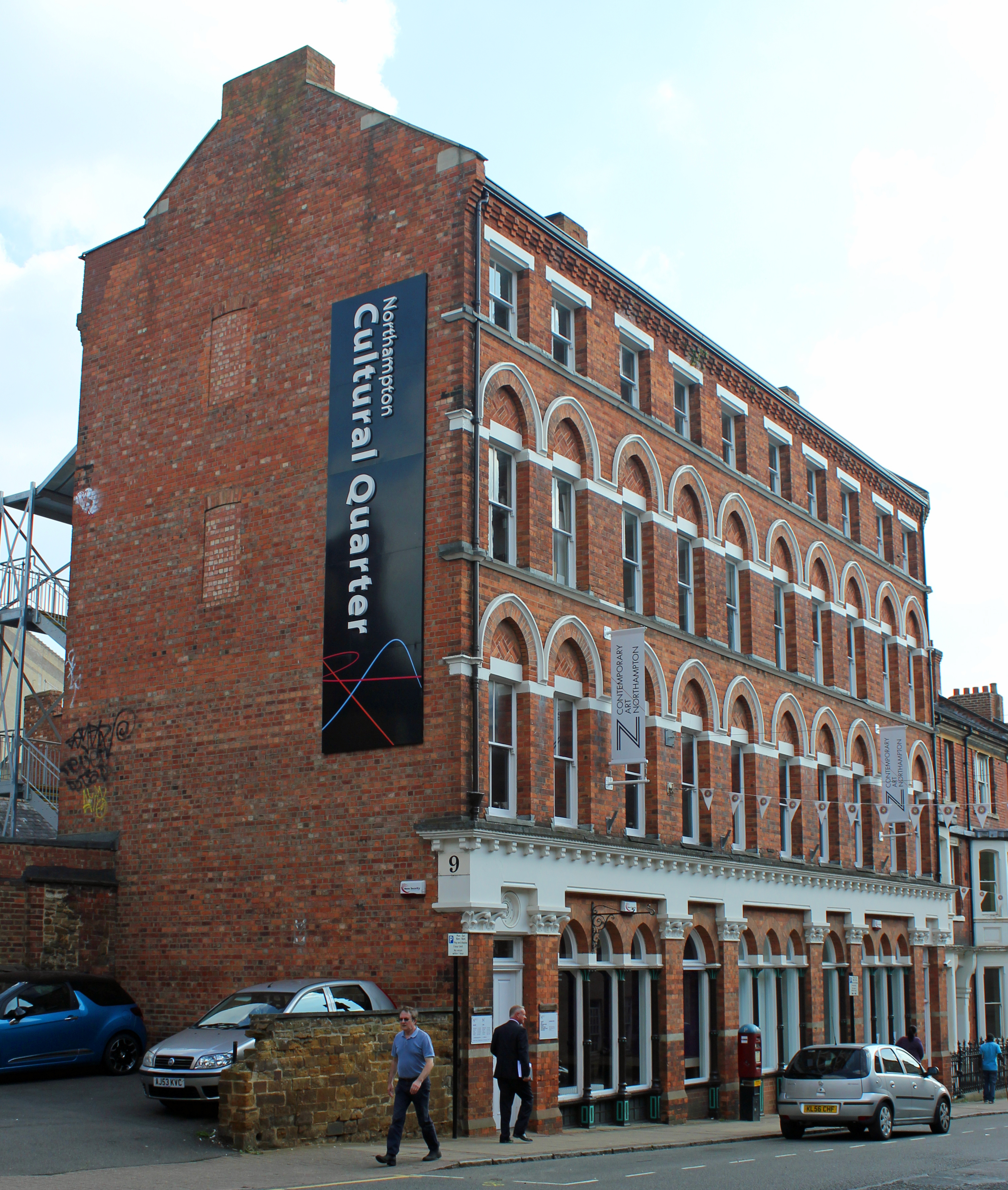
9 Guildhall Road, Northampton

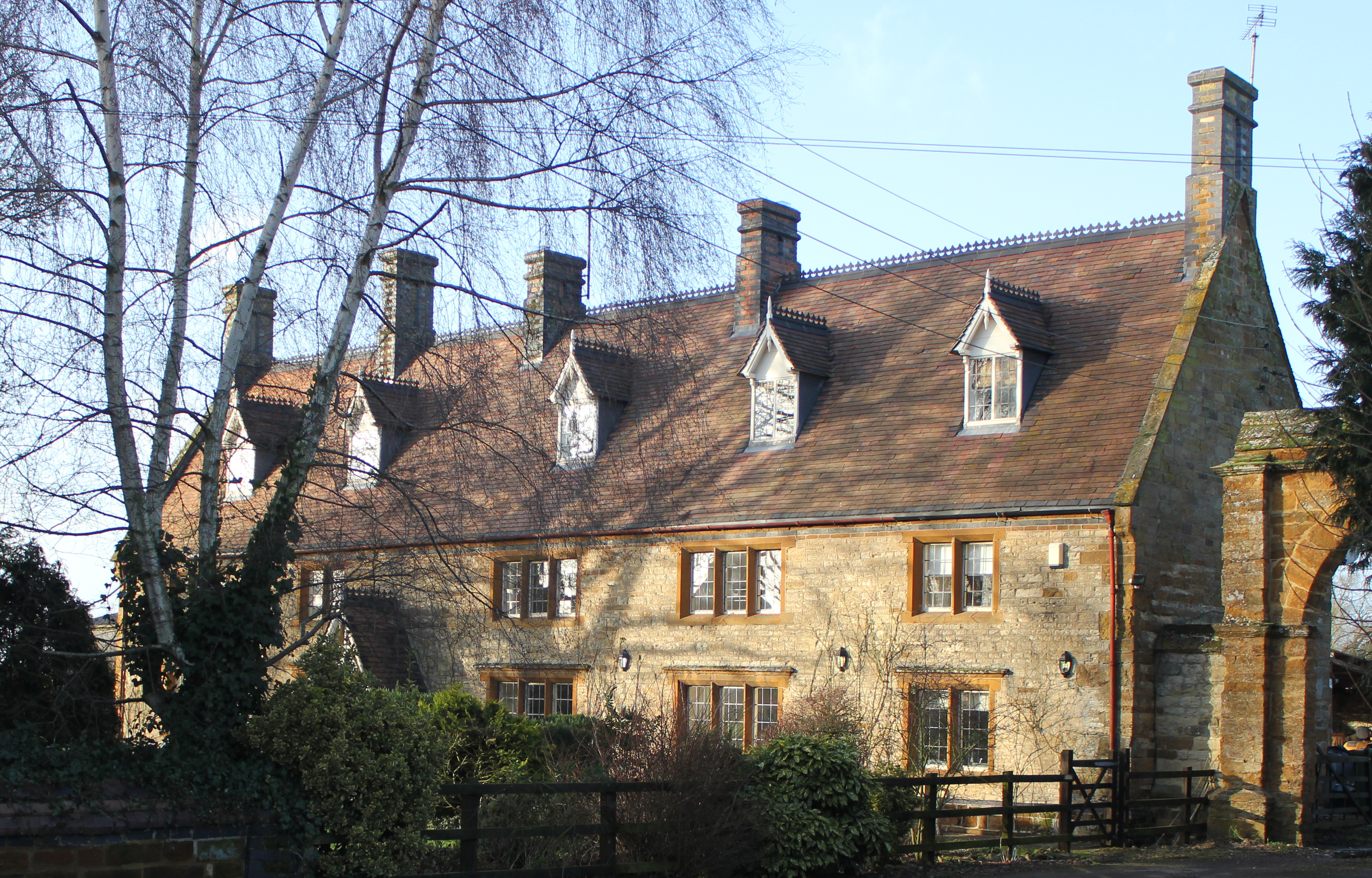
Manor House, Bugbrooke, Northamptonshire, England, restored 1881

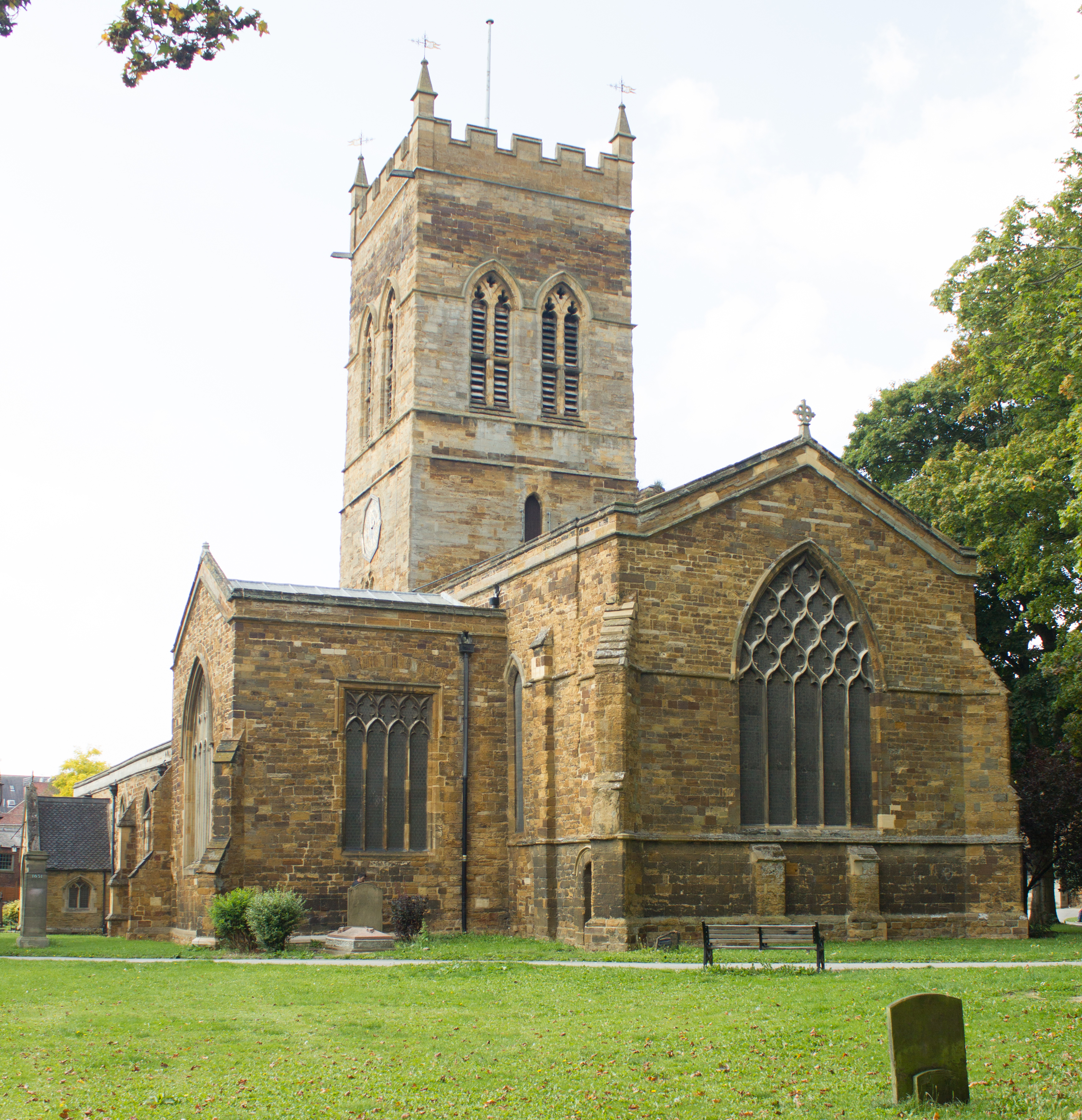
St Giles' Church, Northampton, Grade I listed

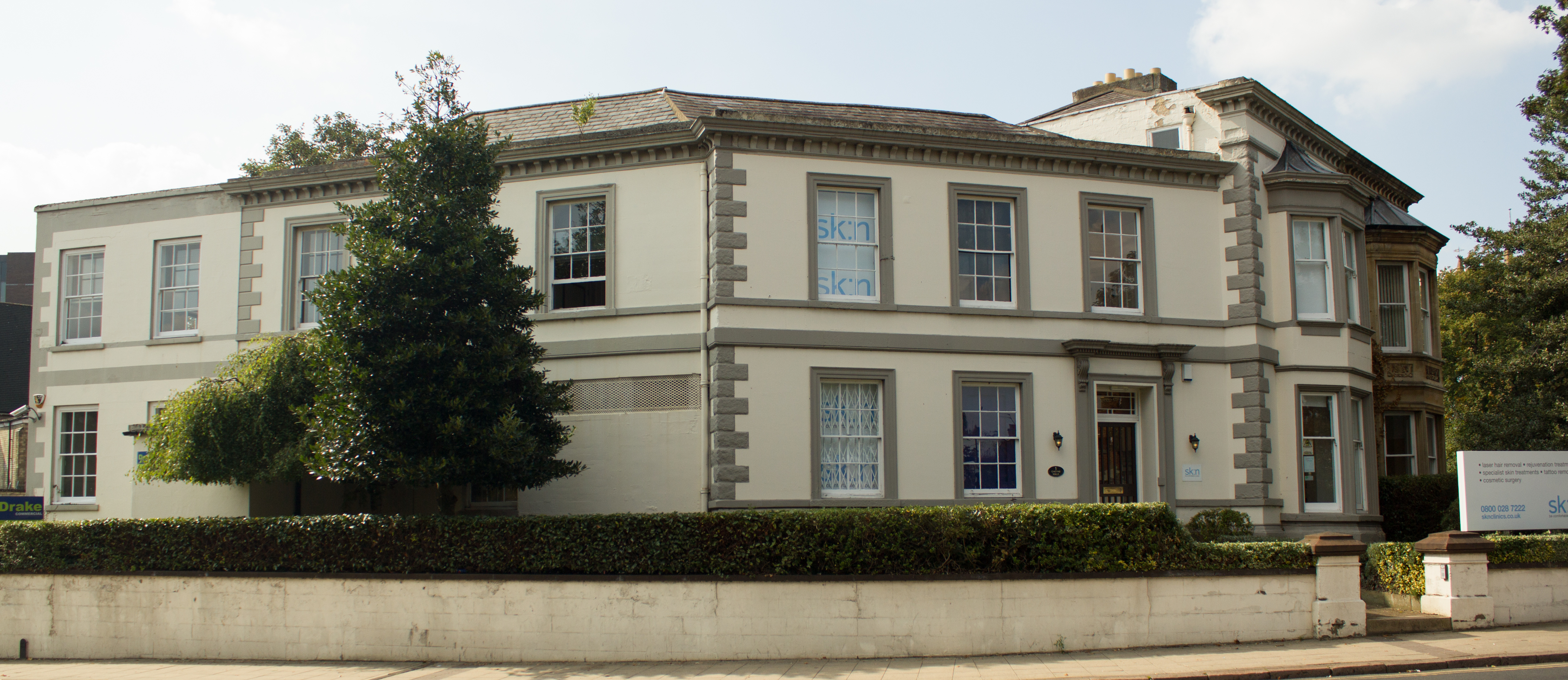
Cheyne Walk, Northampton

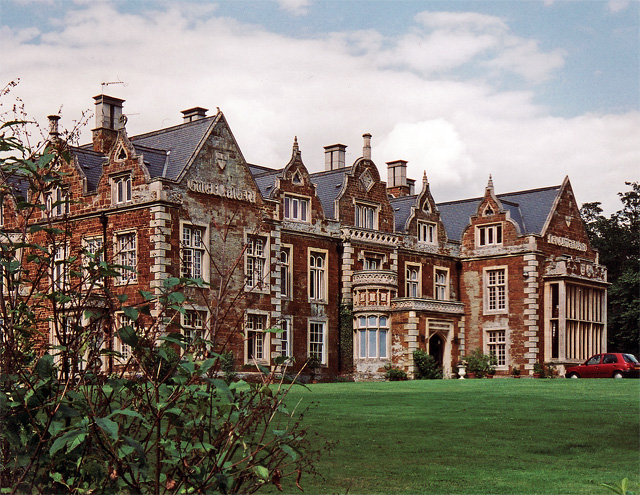
Finedon Hall, Finedon, Northamptonshire

Edmund Francis Law, usually referred to as 'E. F. Law', (26 April 1810 – 14 April 1882, in Northampton) FRIBA was an English architect during the 19th century, notable for a large number of projects, particularly restorations, in the counties of Northamptonshire, Leicestershire and Rutland.

== Career ==
His practice was based in Northampton from 1837 operating from Priory Cottage in the town. He became a Fellow of the Royal Institute of British Architects in 1862, proposed by George Gilbert Scott and others. He was also Northamptonshire County and Northampton Town Surveyor and served as Mayor of Northampton Borough in 1859. He went into partnership with Robert Clarke in 1848. This partnership was short-lived, and dissolved on 31 July 1849.

He had a son, Edmund Law (1840 – 14 April 1904) who was articled to his father from 1855 and continued as his assistant at that time based at 29 Abington Street, Northampton. From 1863 he became a partner with his father and also an assistant with his father as Northamptonshire County and Northampton Town Surveyor. His son also became a Fellow of the Royal Institute of British Architects (RIBA) in 1881.

== Notable works ==
RIBA does not have a full list of his works but has a full list of his son's works. The following list is partial in chronological order:

- Northampton, Church of St Andrew, St Andrews Street (since demolished) 1841–42
- Northampton, National Westminster Bank in The Drapery, 1841. Nikolaus Pevsner says: it is "a remarkable building, restrained, grand, and pure. In the Palladian style with giant columns and a pediment". The exterior is currently (2014) obscured by a bus stop. Formerly part of the Northamptonshire Union Bank, acquired by National Provincial Bank, 1920, and NatWest c. 1970.
- National School building (former – now cottages), Bugbrooke, Northamptonshire, 1844
- Northampton, Lloyd Almshouses, south of Abington Avenue, 1846 in the Tudor style
- Chelveston, Northamptonshire St John Baptist Church: north arcade 1849–50
- Northampton, The Royal Insurance Company building on the Market Square, demolished c. 1961 together with the Emporium Arcade and replaced with mediocre buildings according to Pevsner: "Law's building was only three bays wide but monumental in the Italian Cinquecento style..."
- Sibbertoft, Northamptonshire, The school next to the church, 1846,
- Kettering, Northamptonshire, Corn Exchange and Town Hall 1853
- Winwick, Church of St Michael – chancel replaced by Victorian one, 1853
- Rushton, Northamptonshire, All Saints' Church, restorations 1853 and 1869
- Culworth, Northamptonshire Rectory alterations 1854
- Church of St John the Baptist, Blisworth, Northamptonshire, restoration 1856
- Church of St Mary, Little Addington, Northamptonshire, restoration 1857
- Wellingborough Church of England mortuary chapel c. 1857–58, London Road cemetery. Listed Grade: II
- Moreton Pinkney Manor – entrance arch 1859
- Naseby Manor – alterations 1859
- Tiffield, Northamptonshire St John the Baptist Church, renewal, 1859
- Church of St Peter, Weedon Bec, Northamptonshire, chancel, rebuilt 1863
- Finedon Hall neo-Elizabethan extension of c. 1850 believed to be the work of E. F. Law
- Church of St Giles, Northampton, Grade I listed Work based on 1840 report of George Gilbert Scott, including pulpit, Jacobean, 1863
- Horton, Northamptonshire Church of St Mary Magdalene, rebuilt 1863–1864
- Chelveston, Northamptonshire, Village School and adjoining Masters House built in 1864 by James Ball of Wellingborough for £500 14s 2p.
- Clipston, Northamptonshire Baptist Chapel front 1864
- Cosgrove, Northamptonshire Church of St Peter and St Paul, restoration 1864 (Described by Pevsner as: badly over-restored...the result of Law trying to re-gothicize what had been made plain Georgian in 1770-4.)
- Yardley Gobion Church of St Leonard, nave and chancel, bellcote at the east end of the nave, 1864
- Manor House, Rectory and semi-detached houses, Ashley, Northamptonshire 1865
- Collingtree Grange, Northamptonshire 1865, demolished 1960s; lodges and entrance on the A45 road remain; the park now a golf course and up-market housing estate.
- East Carlton Almshouses, Northamptonshire rebuilt 1866
- Clay Coton, Northamptonshire St Andrew's Church restoration 1866
- Northampton, northernmost house in Cheyne Walk, High Victorian Gothic, 1868
- East Carlton Hall, Northamptonshire 1870
- Adstone Rectory, Northamptonshire 1870
- Thornby, Northamptonshire, Church of St Helen, rebuilding and additions
- Welford, Northamptonshire, Church of St Mary, 1872, north aisle and arcade
- Northampton 9 Guildhall Road, 1872–73, in the Gothic style in red brick, once used as an hotel
- East Carlton Rectory, Northamptonshire 1873
- Brockhall, Northamptonshire – St Peter and St Paul church – re-building 1874
- Culworth, Northamptonshire Parish Church alterations 1880
- St Mary's Church, Badby, Northamptonshire – restoration 1880–81
- Manor House restoration in the Tudor style, Bugbrooke, Northamptonshire 1881
- All Saints' Church, Northampton redecoration on the chancel, 1888
- Guilsborough Grammar School, Northamptonshire; Major restoration in 1858–1859 working with builders Cosford at a cost of about £1641. (Source Guilsborough Historical Society).
