= Westhorp =

Hamlet in Northamptonshire, England

Coordinates: 52.1732°N 1.2531°W

- Location within Northamptonshire
- OS grid reference: SP511530
- Unitary authority: West Northamptonshire
- Ceremonial county: Northamptonshire
- Region: East Midlands
- Country: England
- Sovereign state: United Kingdom
- Post town: Daventry
- Postcode district: NN11
- Dialling code: 01327
- Police: Northamptonshire
- Fire: Northamptonshire
- Ambulance: East Midlands
- UK Parliament: Daventry

Westhorp is a hamlet in the county of Northamptonshire, England. Expansion has led to its merger with the neighbouring village of Byfield. Westhorp is in the civil parish of Byfield.
