= Papley =

Papley is a surname. Notable people with the surname include:

- Max Papley (born 1940), Australian footballer
- Tom Papley (born 1996), Australian footballer

== See also ==
- Pawley
