= Polebrook =

Village in Northamptonshire, England

Coordinates: 52.471°N 0.427°W

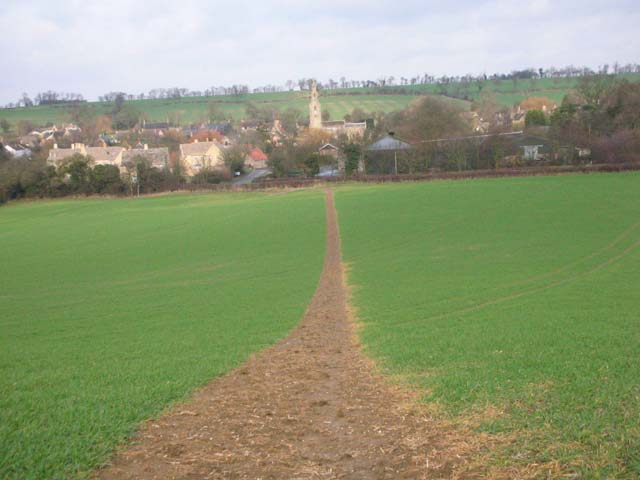

- Location within Northamptonshire
- Population: 478 (2011)
- OS grid reference: TL068871
- Unitary authority: North Northamptonshire
- Ceremonial county: Northamptonshire
- Region: East Midlands
- Country: England
- Sovereign state: United Kingdom
- Post town: Peterborough
- Postcode district: PE8
- Dialling code: 01832
- Police: Northamptonshire
- Fire: Northamptonshire
- Ambulance: East Midlands
- UK Parliament: Corby and East Northamptonshire

Polebrook is a village in Northamptonshire, England. The population (including Armston) at the 2011 census was 478.

== History ==
There is evidence that Polebrook as a settlement dates back to 400 BC, where the village consisted of many farms. The farms were mainly centred on the modern day village of Ashton. Polebrook is called Pochebroc in the Domesday Book, and was the centre of a large administrative area (the Polebrook hundred).

There may have been a wooden church on the site of the current 12th century stone Church of All Saints. Thomas de Thelwall, Chancellor of the Duchy of Lancaster was the parish priest of Polebrook in the 1360s.

RAF Polebrook was a little southeast of the village during the Second World War from 1941 to 1945. The USAAF 351st Bomber Group was stationed at the airfield from 15 April 1943 to 23 June 1945, and the U.S. flag hangs as a memorial to the men, along with a roll of honour in the church. The airfield is now disused, but remains a rich part of Polebrook culture; there is a memorial chapel in Polebrook Church. The base was used as a site for Thor missiles in the 1950s.

For some time during the war Clark Gable was stationed at Polebrook and at RAF Marston Moor near Wetherby. He made morale-boosting visits locally during his time there, an example being Marco in Grantham – a picture appears on the Manthorpe News website.
