= Chapel End =

Chapel End may refer to:

- Billinge Chapel End
- St Anne's, Chapel End, Nuneaton
- Chapel End, Walthamstow
  - Chapel End (ward)

== See also ==
- Chapel-en-le-Frith
