= Armston =

Hamlet in Northamptonshire, England

Coordinates: 52.461°N 0.441°W

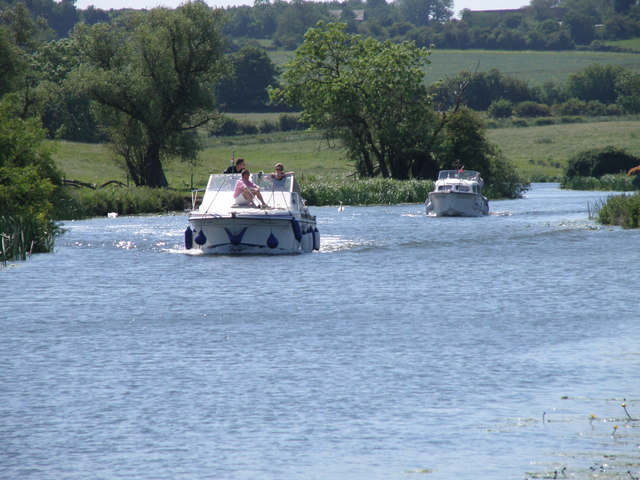
- The River Nene in Armston

- Location within Northamptonshire
- OS grid reference: TL059859
- Civil parish: Polebrook
- Unitary authority: North Northamptonshire
- Ceremonial county: Northamptonshire
- Region: East Midlands
- Country: England
- Sovereign state: United Kingdom
- Post town: PETERBOROUGH
- Postcode district: PE8
- Dialling code: 01832
- Police: Northamptonshire
- Fire: Northamptonshire
- Ambulance: East Midlands
- UK Parliament: Corby and East Northamptonshire

Armston is a hamlet and former civil parish, now in the parish of Polebrook, in the North Northamptonshire district, in the ceremonial county of Northamptonshire, England. In 1931 the parish had a population of 22.

== History ==
The hamlets name means 'Eorm's/Earnmund's farm/settlement'. In 1866 Armston became a civil parish, on 1 April 1935 the parish was abolished and merged with Polebrook.
