= Chelveston =

Village in Northamptonshire, England

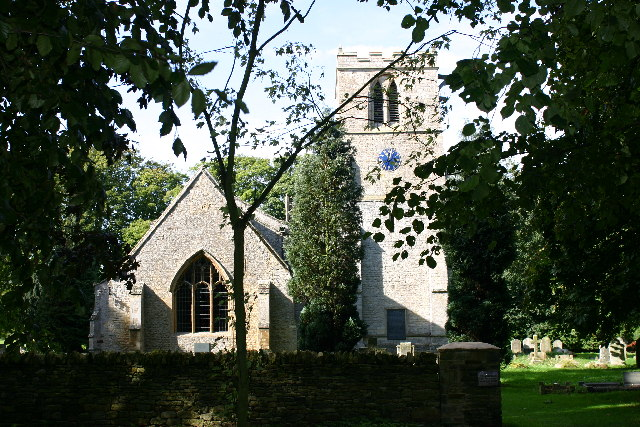
- Saint John the Baptist Church at Chelveston, in 2005

- Location within Northamptonshire
- Population: 541 (2001)
- OS grid reference: SP9972
- Civil parish: Chelveston cum Caldecott
- Unitary authority: North Northamptonshire
- Ceremonial county: Northamptonshire
- Region: East Midlands
- Country: England
- Sovereign state: United Kingdom
- Post town: WELLINGBOROUGH
- Postcode district: NN9
- Dialling code: 01933
- Police: Northamptonshire
- Fire: Northamptonshire
- Ambulance: East Midlands
- UK Parliament: Wellingborough

Chelveston is a small village in North Northamptonshire. It is about 2 miles (3.2 km) east of Higham Ferrers and 7 miles (11.3 km) east of Wellingborough on the B645 (former A45 road) from Higham Ferrers to St Neots. To the south is the hamlet of Caldecott and the settlement of Chelston Rise which together comprise the civil parish of Chelveston cum Caldecott. The population is now included in the civil parish of Chelveston cum Caldecott.

== History ==
The villages name means 'Ceolwulfs farm/settlement'. At the time of the Domesday Book, 1086, Chelveston came under the manor of Higham Ferrers and later was awarded by the crown to different noble families. In the 1550s the manor of Chelveston was acquired by the Ekins family, who passed it down by inheritance until 1694.

The last lords of the manor of Chelveston were the Disbrowe family, and the last lord, Lt. Col. Henry Edward Disbrowe Disbrowe-Wise CBE, who had inherited the title from his mother, sold off the last of the family's estate properties in Chelveston at auction in July 1919. Disbrowe-Wise moved to other family properties in South Derbyshire. Disbrowe Court in the village is named after them.

== Parish Church ==
The parish church is dedicated to Saint John the Baptist and is mostly 13th century. The north arcade is 1849–50 by Edmund Francis Law, a Northampton architect. It is a Grade II* listed building. Notable burials include Pollie Hirst Simpson.

== Village Hall ==
Formerly the village's two room school with adjacent schoolmasters house, built in 1864 by James Ball of Wellingborough for £500 14s 2d. Edmund Francis Law, was the architect.

The school was closed in 1967 and was re-opened in 1972 as the Village Hall. In 2014 it was refurbished and extended with new toilets, shower and kitchen facilities.

== Heritage assets ==
The following buildings and structures are listed by Historic England as of special architectural or historic interest.

- Poplar Farmhouse (Grade II) 17th century 52.30864°N 0.54857°W
- Manor Farmhouse (Grade II) 18th century 52.30883°N 0.55075°W
- Manor Farmhouse, Barn (Grade II) 18th century 52.30884°N 0.55106°W
- Duchy Farmhouse (Grade II) 17th century 52.30866°N 0.55257°W
- Church of St John The Baptist (Grade II*) 13th century 52.31136°N 0.55152°W
- The Cottage (Grade II) 18th century 52.31538°N 0.54762°W

== RAF Chelveston ==
Nearby is the former airfield of RAF Chelveston. A new memorial to the 305th Bombardment Group (Heavy) who operated out of the airfield, was unveiled in the centre of the village on 26 May 2007.

== Demography ==
- In 1801 there were 266 persons
- In 1831 there were 332 persons
- In 1841 there were 288 persons
- In 2011 there were 566 persons

== Chelston Rise ==
Beyond Caldecott is a settlement of 50 houses which were formerly used by the United States Air Force to house families working at nearby bases. The site was owned by Area Estates Ltd. Some of the houses were rented out and others sold privately. This community has been renamed Chelston Rise (from the old name for Chelveston). A resident run management company took control of the private estate in 2015 when the last house was sold and has continued to run as a private estate since then.

== Nearby Settlements ==
- Ringstead, Keyston, Stanwick, Rushden, Higham Ferrers, Thrapston, Hargrave, Irthlingborough, Newton Bromswold, Raunds and Wellingborough.
