= Bugbrooke =

Village and civil parish in Northamptonshire, England

Coordinates: 52.21055°N 1.010613°W

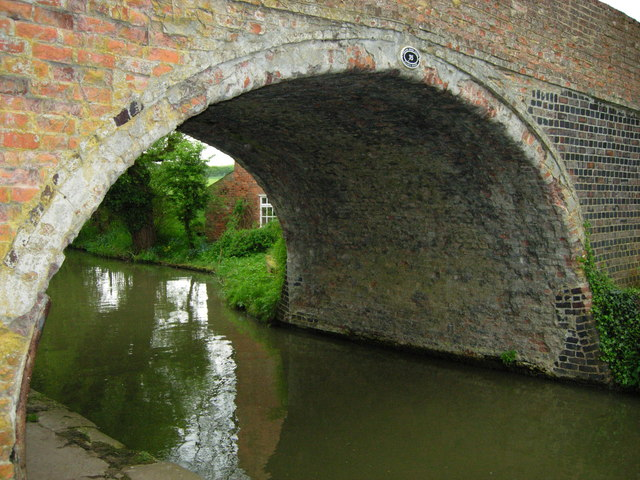
- Grand Union Canal near Bugbrooke

- Location within Northamptonshire
- Population: 2,773 (2001 Census); 2010 est. 2,924
- OS grid reference: SP680575
  - London: 74 miles (119 km)
- Civil parish: Bugbrooke
- Unitary authority: West Northamptonshire
- Ceremonial county: Northamptonshire
- Region: East Midlands
- Country: England
- Sovereign state: United Kingdom
- Post town: NORTHAMPTON
- Postcode district: NN7
- Dialling code: 01604
- Police: Northamptonshire
- Fire: Northamptonshire
- Ambulance: East Midlands
- UK Parliament: Daventry

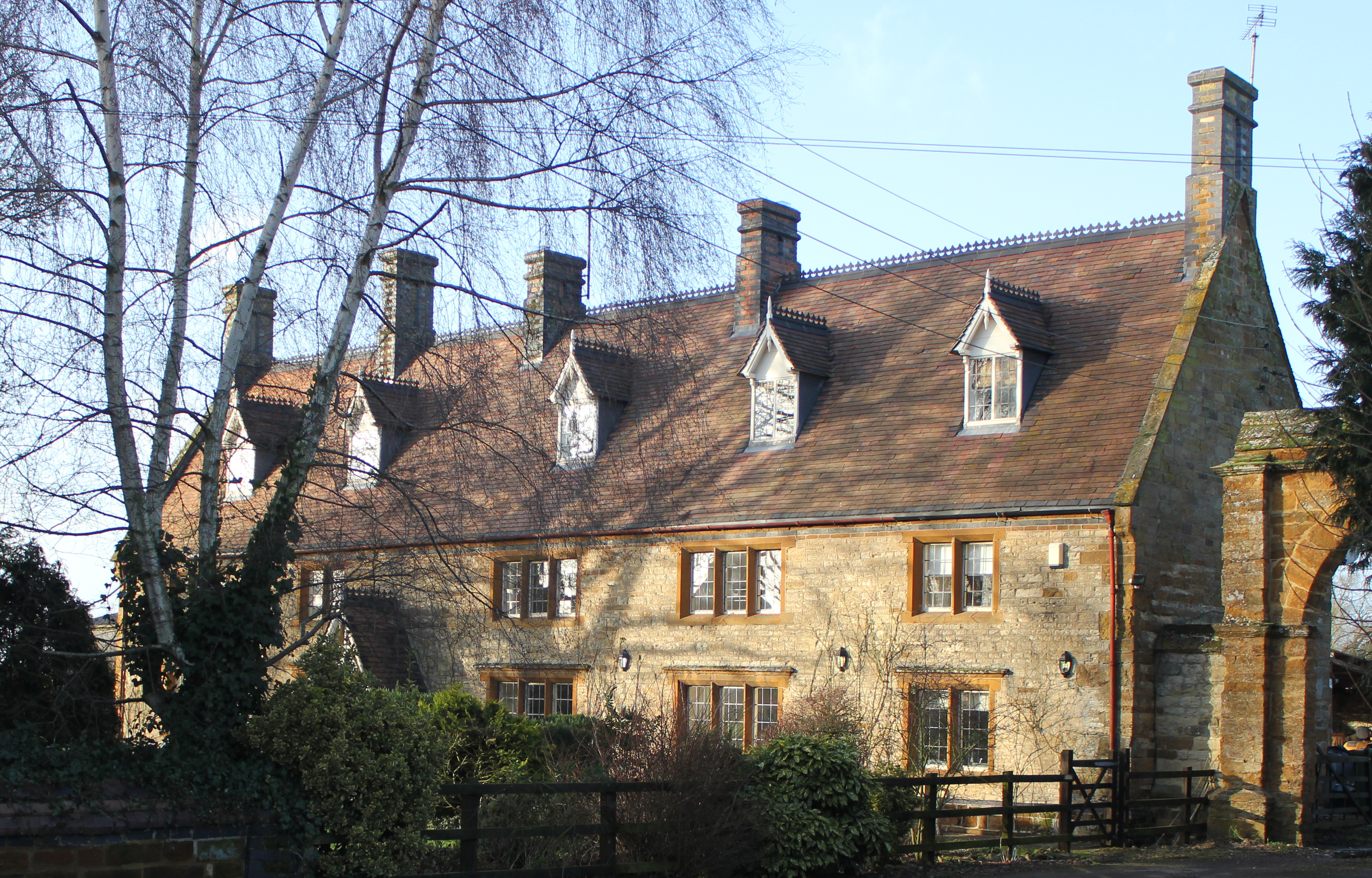
Manor House, Bugbrooke, restored 1881

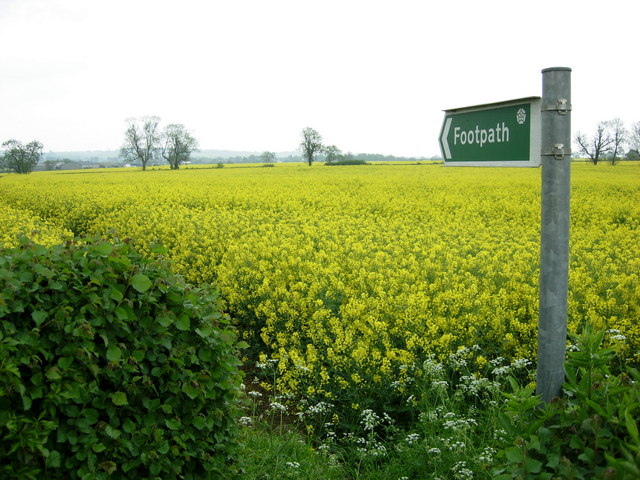
Public footpath near Bugbrooke

Bugbrooke is a village and civil parish in West Northamptonshire, England, on a ridge overlooking the valley of the River Nene.

== Location ==
Bugbrooke is situated about 7 miles (11.3 km) south west of Northampton and 5 miles (8 km) north of Towcester. The M1, one of the busiest motorways in England is about 2 miles (3.2 km) by the shortest route to junction 16.

== History ==
The village's name's origin is uncertain: 'Bucca's brook', 'bucks' brook' or 'he-goats' brook'.

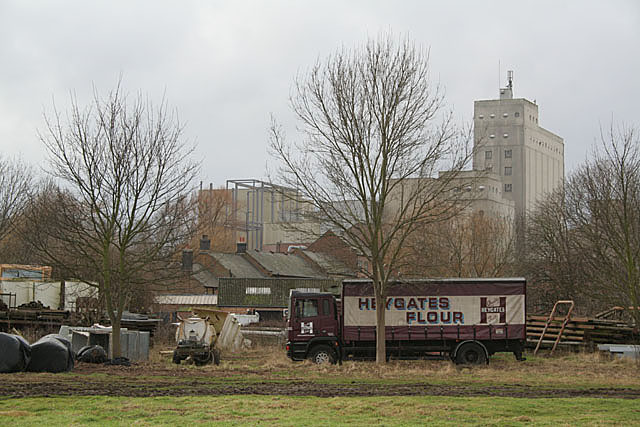
Bugbrooke Mill

The village, named in the Domesday Book of 1086 AD as Buchebroc, is on the Hoarestone Brook, which flows through the village from south to north. The name of the stream is supposed to be a corruption of Horse-stone, as an old packhorse route crossed the brook by a simple slab bridge just outside the village. When the stream was widened in the 1970s the last of the medieval slabs was damaged beyond repair, but the pillars are still intact.

The brook meets the River Nene near Bugbrooke Mill. The first mill on the site was established in 800 AD, and by the time of the Domesday Book it was the third-highest-rated mill in England. It is now the site of Heygate's flour mill, the large central tower of which can be seen for several miles around. Heygate's trucks, with their distinctive maroon markings, can frequently be seen rumbling along Bugbrooke's main road.

== Demographics ==
The 2001 census shows a population of 2,773 people, 1,376 males and 1,397 female in 1,029 households. The 2010 population estimate is 2,924.

== Governance ==
Bugbrooke is situated in the Parliamentary Constituency of Daventry, which is considered a "safe" Conservative seat. In the 2024 General Election, the seat returned Conservative M.P., Stuart Andrew.

Bugbrooke is in the West Northamptonshire unitary authority. Before local government restructuring in 2021 it was in South Northamptonshire Council's two-member "Heyfords and Bugbrooke" ward, covering the village as well as neighbouring Nether Heyford and Upper Heyford.

From May 2013 until its abolition, the Northamptonshire County Council seat of Bugbrooke joined with 10 other parish councils to form Bugbrooke division.

Bugbrooke Parish Council meets monthly and is re-elected every four years.

== Buildings and other facilities ==
Bugbrooke has an Anglican church, dedicated to St Michael and All Angels which dates from the 13th century. There are monuments to the Whitfield family from 1704 and 1734. There is an early 19th-century rectory, now a private house, west of the church.

The Baptist chapel is dated 1808. A row of yellow-brick cottages in Church Lane, close to the brook were built in 1844 in the Gothic style by Edmund Francis Law and were originally a National School with accommodation for the master.

There is a manor house at the northeast end of the village with a wide-arched entrance to the yard. This was restored in the Tudor style by Edmund Francis Law in 1881.

The village has two pubs: The Bakers Arms in the High Street and The Five Bells opposite the church. Bugbrooke Medical Centre, situated in Levitts Road, provides a range of General Practice (GP) and other medical services, with a pharmacy and sub-post office on the same site.

Bugbrooke Community Primary School is in the High Street, and a large comprehensive school, Campion School, serving Bugbrooke and several nearby villages, is situated on Kislingbury Road on the eastern approach to the village. It was built in 1966-68 with extension in 1971-72 and was the first purpose-built comprehensive in the county.

A village magazine, "Bugbrooke Link", is published bi-monthly, and includes regular reporting of Church, Parish Council and sports events.

== Sport and leisure ==
Bugbrooke Rugby Union Football Club was established in 1977 and is located to the east of the village on Camp Close, Bugbrooke. The club have 3 senior XV teams playing in the Midland Division, and an active Junior section.

Bugbrooke St Michaels F.C. was established in 1929 and is named after the village church. The club plays on Birds Close, off Gayton Road, Bugbrooke. They have both Men and Ladies senior teams and a junior section. Nicknamed 'The Badgers', they play in the English United Counties League.

Bugbrooke Cricket Club is located on The Doc White Cricket Ground, Camp Hill Farm, Bugbrooke. The club have three senior Saturday XI teams that compete in the Northamptonshire Cricket League, and a Sunday friendly XI side that compete in and around the region.

Bugbrooke Badminton Club was established in 2010 and is based at Campion Secondary School, Kislingbury Road, Bugbrooke. Bugbrooke BC compete in the Northamptonshire Badminton League

There is a large, modern community centre at Camp Close on the southern edge of the village. Adjacent to this is a large sports field.

== Other features ==
The West Coast Main Line railway and the Grand Union Canal run adjacent to the south-west of the parish, with the A5 major road a little further to the west, while the M1 motorway runs to the north-east.

Bugbrooke was the birthplace of the Jesus Army, which sprang out of the Baptist Chapel in the centre of the village.

Northampton's Express Lift Tower can be seen from the village about 5 miles (8.0 km) to the east.

== Bibliography ==
- Peet, David (1970). The Parish Church of St. Michael and All Angels at Bugbrooke. Northampton: The Mercury Press.
- Toynbee, Heather (1979). ...and the King passed by. Bugbrooke: Buchebroc Press.
- Kent, Pat (1999). Gleaners to Graduates: a History of Education in Bugbrooke. Bugbrooke: Buchebroc Press. ISBN 1-871917-02-6.
- Bugbrooke History Society, ed. (1999). Bugbrooke: 2000BC to 2000AD. Bugbrooke: Buchebroc Press. ISBN 1-871917-03-4.
- Bugbrooke History Society, ed. (2007). Pictorial Bugbrooke: 1860–1960. Bugbrooke: Bugbrooke History Society.
