= Grimscote =

Hamlet in Northamptonshire, England

Coordinates: 52.176811°N 1.047375°W

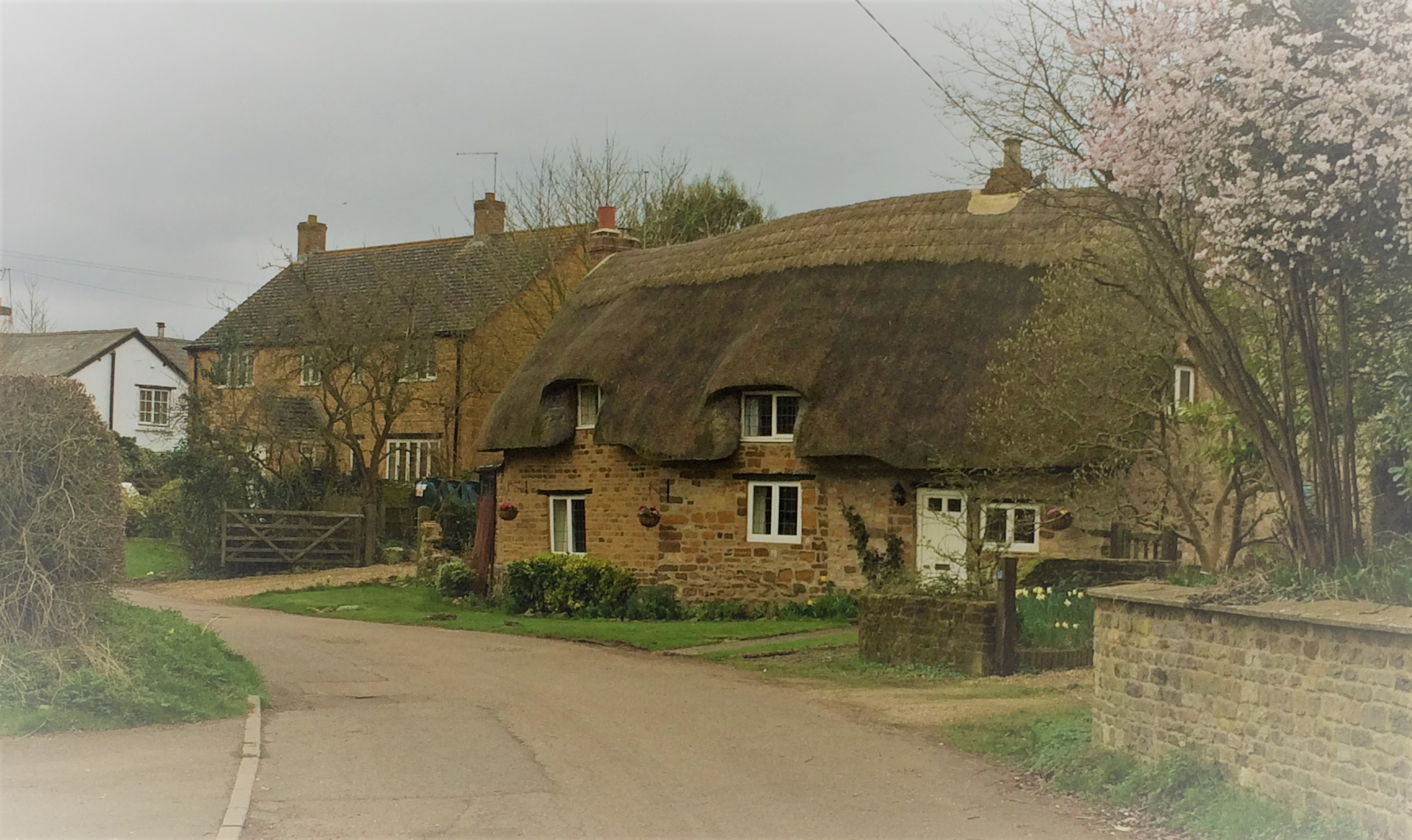
- Grimscote

- Location within Northamptonshire
- Population: 241 (2011 Census)
- OS grid reference: SP6553
  - London: 72 miles (116 km)
- Unitary authority: West Northamptonshire
- Ceremonial county: Northamptonshire
- Region: East Midlands
- Country: England
- Sovereign state: United Kingdom
- Post town: Towcester
- Postcode district: NN12
- Dialling code: 01327
- Police: Northamptonshire
- Fire: Northamptonshire
- Ambulance: East Midlands
- UK Parliament: South Northamptonshire

Grimscote is a hamlet in the civil parish of Cold Higham, in the West Northamptonshire district of Northamptonshire, England. Grimscote is one of 4 settlements (Cold Higham, Fosters Booth (West) and Potcote) that make up Cold Higham parish. According to the 2011 UK census, the population in Grimscote in 2011 was 241. It is understood that the name Grimscote means "Grim's Cott", Grim being another name for Woden.

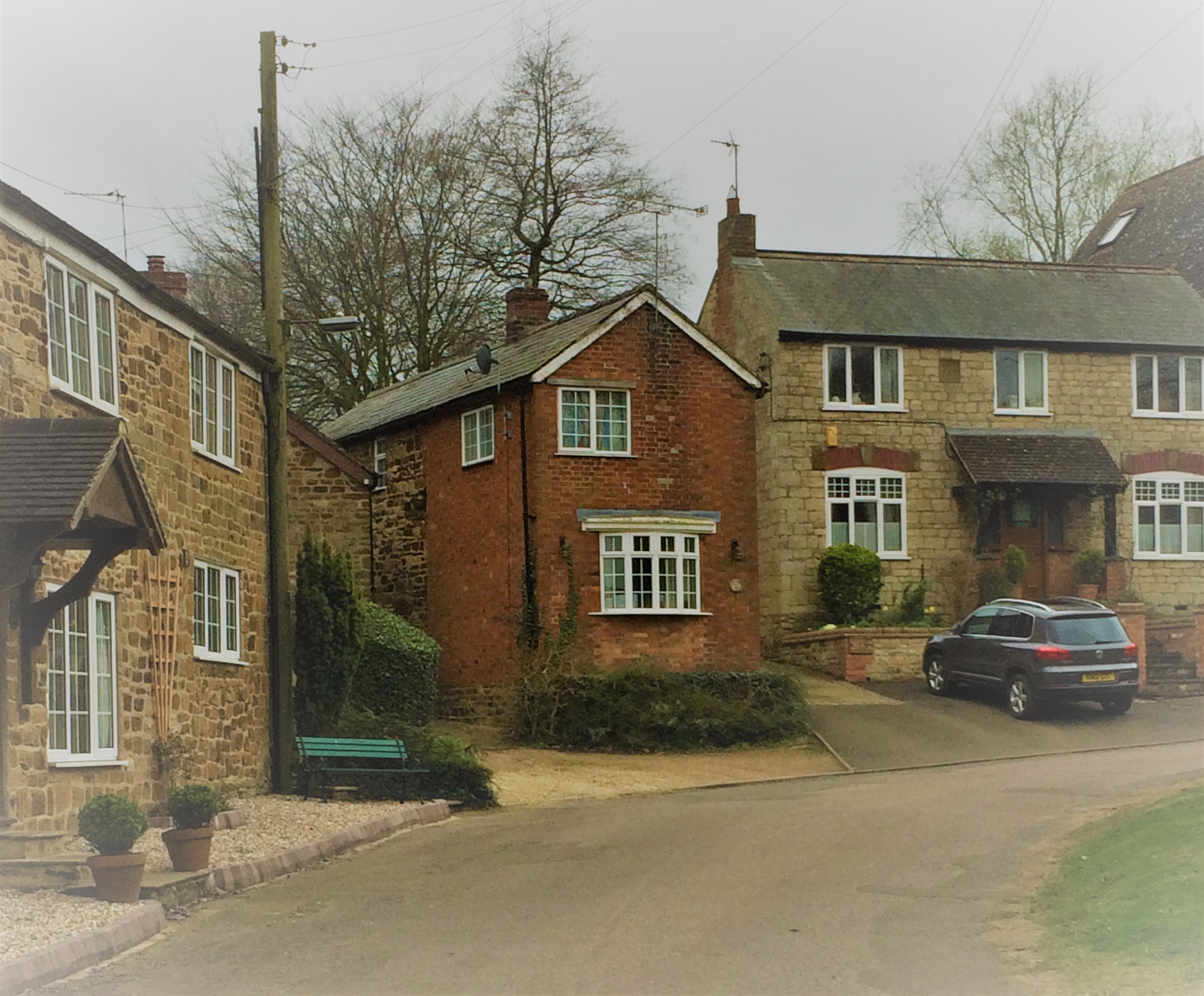
Grimscote. Manor Road, heading east.

== Geology ==
The hamlet of Grimscote is mainly situated on Northampton Sand bedrock, with a band of Lower Estuarine and Upper Estuarine Limestone to the south of the settlement.

== History ==
The hamlet is the largest centre of population in the parish and already was so in the early 18th century. Little is known of its history, but extensive earthworks around it might suggest that it was once much larger than it is now. The Duke of Grafton was the major landowner in Grimscote until 1919, when most of the property was sold. Grimscote has 4 Grade II listed buildings: 2 houses on Manor Road, a house on Penthorne Close, and 'Ivy Bank' along with its barn. The former Baptist Chapel is also on Manor Road.

== Sport and recreation ==
Although there is no evidence of a pub today, there was once an outdoor beerhouse in Grimscote during the early 1900s. A photo taken circa 1928 shows what are presumably locals, two of whom were dressed in cricket whites, relaxing with a beer outside the beerhouse. The beer was served through a window and a bell was accessible for service.
