= Pattishall =

Village in Northamptonshire, England

Coordinates: 52.182421°N 1.019295°W

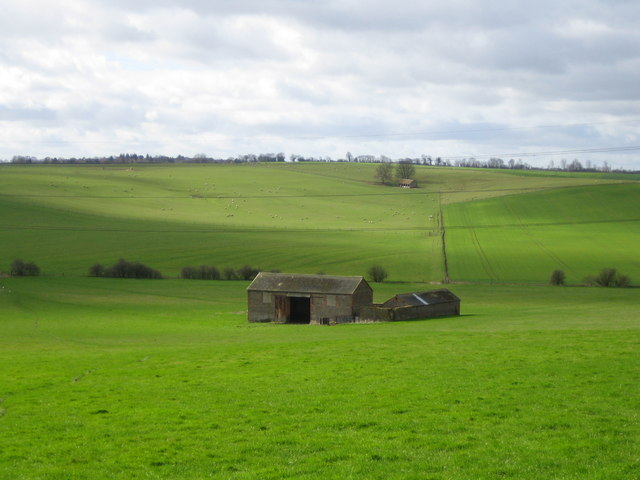
- Fields between Pattishall and Bugbrooke

- Location within Northamptonshire
- Population: 1,471 (2011 Census)
- OS grid reference: SP671542
  - London: 72 miles (116 km)
- Civil parish: Pattishall
- Unitary authority: West Northamptonshire
- Ceremonial county: Northamptonshire
- Region: East Midlands
- Country: England
- Sovereign state: United Kingdom
- Post town: TOWCESTER
- Postcode district: NN12
- Dialling code: 01327
- Police: Northamptonshire
- Fire: Northamptonshire
- Ambulance: East Midlands
- UK Parliament: South Northamptonshire

Pattishall, also known in antiquity as Pateshull, is a village and Parish in West Northamptonshire, England. The population of the civil parish (including Astcote, Dalscote and Eastcote) was 1,471 at the 2011 census. The village lies adjacent to the Roman road Watling Street (A5) and Banbury Lane, an ancient drove way, 4 miles north of Towcester and 7 miles south of Northampton.

The civil parish of Pattishall includes the villages of Pattishall, Eastcote, Astcote and Dalscote, part of Fosters Booth, and the hamlet of Cornhillin Eastcote).

== Geography ==
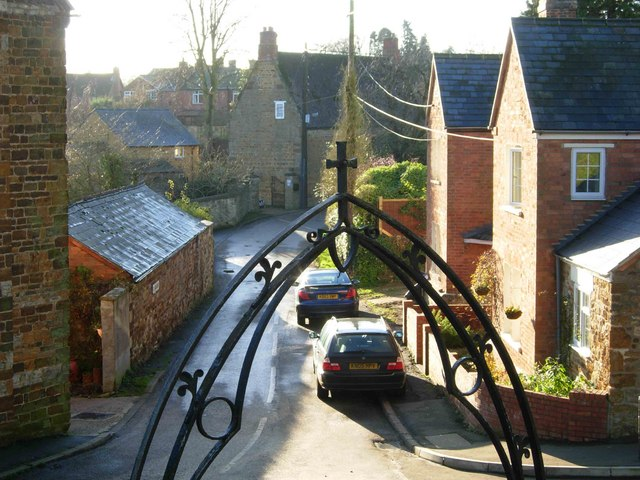
Pattishall: Looking along the Crescent through the church gate

Pattishall is a small village located approximately 4.2 miles from Towcester, 8.3 miles from Wootton and 2.8 miles from Bugbrooke. Pattishall is surrounded by hilly fields and contains both 20th century housing and an older part of the village which is down a hill. The postcodes for the Towcester area begin NN12. In Pattishall there is one school, a Church of England primary school.

== History ==
The name is derived from the Patishall family, three of whom were eminent judges during the 13th century, including one, Simon of Pattishall, who drafted Magna Carta. Pattishall was host to a prisoner-of-war camp during World War I, which housed 4500 Germans.

== Demography ==
The civil parish of Pattishall had a population of 1,501 people at the time of the 2001 census, including a Christian community of around 50 people, part of the evangelical Christian group, the Jesus Army.

== Landmarks ==
Pattishall includes a church, park and a working farm.

== Sport ==
Pattishall Cricket Club and ground is located south of the village off School Road. A club senior XI team play friendlies against clubs in and around the local region.

Cornhill Squash Club is based in Cornhill Manor, Pattishall, and enters annual Summer and Winter Leagues.
