= Astcote =

Hamlet in Northamptonshire, England

Coordinates: 52.173359°N 1.01072°W

- Location within Northamptonshire
- OS grid reference: SP677532
- Unitary authority: West Northamptonshire
- Ceremonial county: Northamptonshire
- Region: East Midlands
- Country: England
- Sovereign state: United Kingdom
- Post town: Towcester
- Postcode district: NN12
- Police: Northamptonshire
- Fire: Northamptonshire
- Ambulance: East Midlands

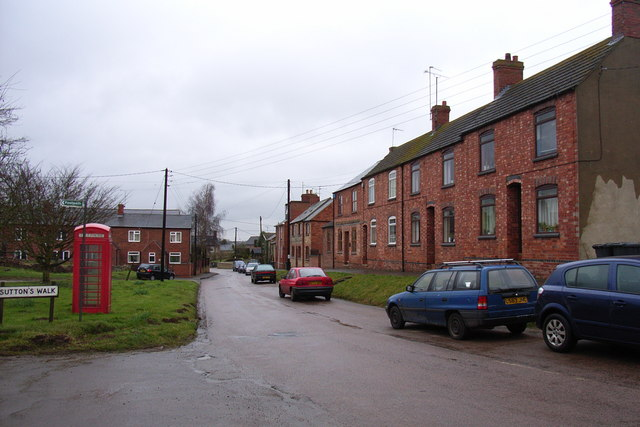
Houses in Astcote

Astcote is a hamlet near the town of Towcester in Northamptonshire, England. It is in the civil parish of Pattishall.

The settlement was recorded in the Domesday Book under the name of Aviescote.
