= Chipping Warden =

Village in Northamptonshire, England

Coordinates: 52.136°N 1.272°W

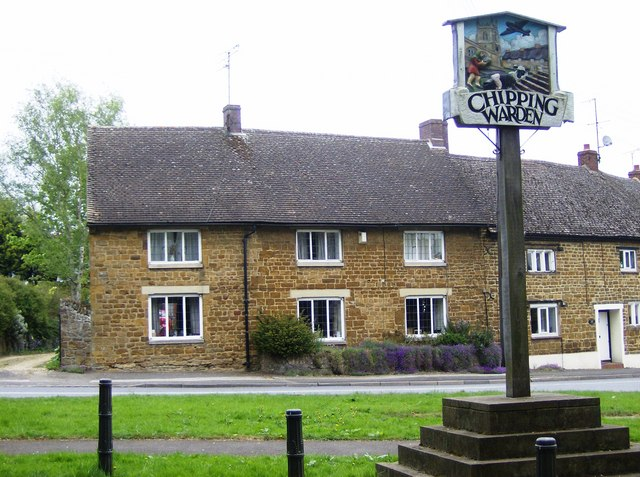

- Location within Northamptonshire
- Population: 529 (2001 census); 537 (2011 census)
- OS grid reference: SP4948
  - London: 70 miles (113 km)
- Civil parish: Chipping Warden and Edgcote
- Unitary authority: West Northamptonshire
- Ceremonial county: Northamptonshire
- Region: East Midlands
- Country: England
- Sovereign state: United Kingdom
- Post town: Banbury
- Postcode district: OX17
- Dialling code: 01295
- Police: Northamptonshire
- Fire: Northamptonshire
- Ambulance: East Midlands
- UK Parliament: South Northamptonshire
- Website: Welcome to the Chipping Warden Parish Web Site

Chipping Warden is a village in the civil parish of Chipping Warden and Edgcote, in the West Northamptonshire district, in the county of Northamptonshire, England, about 6 miles (10 km) northeast of the Oxfordshire town of Banbury.

The parish is bounded to the east and south by the River Cherwell, to the west by the boundary with Oxfordshire and to the north by field boundaries. On 1 October 2008 the parish was abolished and merged with Edgcote to form "Chipping Warden & Edgcote".

The 2001 Census recorded a parish population of 529 in 234 households, increasing to 537 in the civil parish of Chipping Warden and Edgcote at the 2011 census.

== Toponymy ==
'Warden' means 'Watch hill', referring to Warden Hill a mile northeast of the village. It had a 'market' from the late 14th century hence the 'Chipping' addition. The hundred is named after Chipping Warden.

== Archaeology ==
Just south of Chipping Warden village is Arbury Banks, the remains of an Iron Age hillfort. It is about 200 yards (180 m) in diameter and has been heavily damaged by centuries of ploughing.

At Blackgrounds about 3/4 mile (1.2 km) east of the village are the remains of a Roman villa beside the River Cherwell. An investigation in 1849 found a Roman bathhouse 36 feet (11 m) long by 18 feet (5.5 m) wide, and four human burials have been found that may be related to the settlement. Roman coins found at the site indicate that it was inhabited in the 3rd and 4th centuries AD. English Heritage has placed the villa on its Heritage at Risk Register, citing threats from ploughing and a risk of collapse.

== Geology ==
2 miles (3 km) east of the village is Upper Cherwell at Trafford House at the confluence of the river Cherwell and Eydon Brook, which is designated as a SSSI due to its importance in the development of the theory of underfit streams.

== Manor ==
The Domesday Book records that in 1086 the manor of Chipping Warden was the caput of the estates of Guy de Raimbeaucourt (or Reimbercourt, Reinbuedcurth or Reinbuedcurt), a baron from Raimbeaucourt in northern France. There was also a Hundred of Chipping Warden that administered the southern part of Northamptonshire.

Guy was succeeded by his son Richard de Raimbeaucourt (circa 1093–1120). Richard left no male heir so the barony of Chipping Warden passed via his daughter Margaret (born 1121) to his son-in-law Robert Foliot (circa 1118–1172), to whom Henry II conceded the barony of Chipping Warden in the middle of the 12th century. As Robert had a wife and son, presumably he is not the Robert Foliot who was Archdeacon of Oxford and later Bishop of Hereford.

The toponym "Chipping" is derived from the Old English cēping meaning "market". In 1238 Robert Grosseteste, Bishop of Lincoln obtained royal letters from Henry III revoking Chipping Warden's right to hold a market. This was because the Bishops of Lincoln controlled the market at Banbury and earned tolls from it, and Grosseteste feared that Chipping Warden was drawing trade away from Banbury.

== Parish church ==
In the Church of England parish church of St. Peter and St. Paul the north wall of the chancel contains two blocked-up Norman arches that suggest the building may date from about 1200. The chancel contains a window that pre-dates 1300, but is probably not in its original position. Other features from the Decorated Gothic period include the windows of the south aisle and the east window of a room to the north of the chancel. The east window of the chancel and the four-bay arcades between the nave and the north and south aisles are from the early part of the Perpendicular Gothic period. The bell tower is also Perpendicular Gothic. The parish is now part of the Church of England benefice of Culworth with Sulgrave and Thorpe Mandeville and Chipping Warden with Edgcote and Moreton Pinkney.

== Social and economic history ==
Chipping Warden Inclosure Act 1732
- Act of Parliament
- Parliament of Great Britain
- Long title: An Act for enclosing and dividing the Common Fields and Common Grounds, lying in the Manor and Parish of Chipping Warden, in the County of Northampton.
- Citation: 6 Geo. 2. c. 6 Pr.
- Territorial extent: Great Britain

Dates
- Royal assent: 17 May 1733
- Commencement: 16 January 1733 (Note: Start of session.)

Status: Current legislation

An open field system of farming prevailed in the parish until an act of Parliament, the Chipping Warden Inclosure Act 1732 (6 Geo. 2. c. 6 Pr.), was passed in May 1733 enabling Chipping Warden's common lands to be enclosed.

In May 1744 a bill was moved in the House of Lords to dissolve the marriage between Henry Scudamore, 3rd Duke of Beaufort and Frances Scudamore. Among witnesses who testified under oath before their Lordships was John Pargiter, a farmer of Chipping Warden, who stated:

"That, in the Beginning of June, 1741, he observed a Man (whom he described), and afterwards found it was Lord Talbot, to meet the Dutchess as she was walking alone in the Fields near that Place; and thereupon mentioned adulterous Familiarities which passed between them."

Witnesses William Douglas and Thomas Bonham corroborated Pargiter's evidence. The Journal of the House of Lords delicately omits the details of the "adulterous Familiarities" but records that subsequent witnesses testified "as to the sending for a Midwife to the Dutchess; her being delivered or brought to Bed of a Daughter". After hearing this and evidence of the duchess's further adultery with Lord Talbot, the Lords passed the bill for the duke and duchess to be divorced, which became the Duke of Beaufort's Divorce Act 1743 (17 Geo. 2. c. 2 Pr.).

RAF Chipping Warden, just northwest of the village, was built during the Second World War and commissioned in either 1941 or 1943 as a Bomber Command Operational Training Unit. It was decommissioned in 1946. Its buildings are now an industrial estate.

== Amenities ==
Chipping Warden has two public houses, The Griffin Inn and The Rose and Crown. The village has a primary school.

== Transport ==
Buses are run by Stagecoach Oxfordshire. Services run to Banbury or Daventry.
