= Byfield, Northamptonshire =

Village in Northamptonshire, England

Coordinates: 52.1774°N 1.2483°W

Byfield
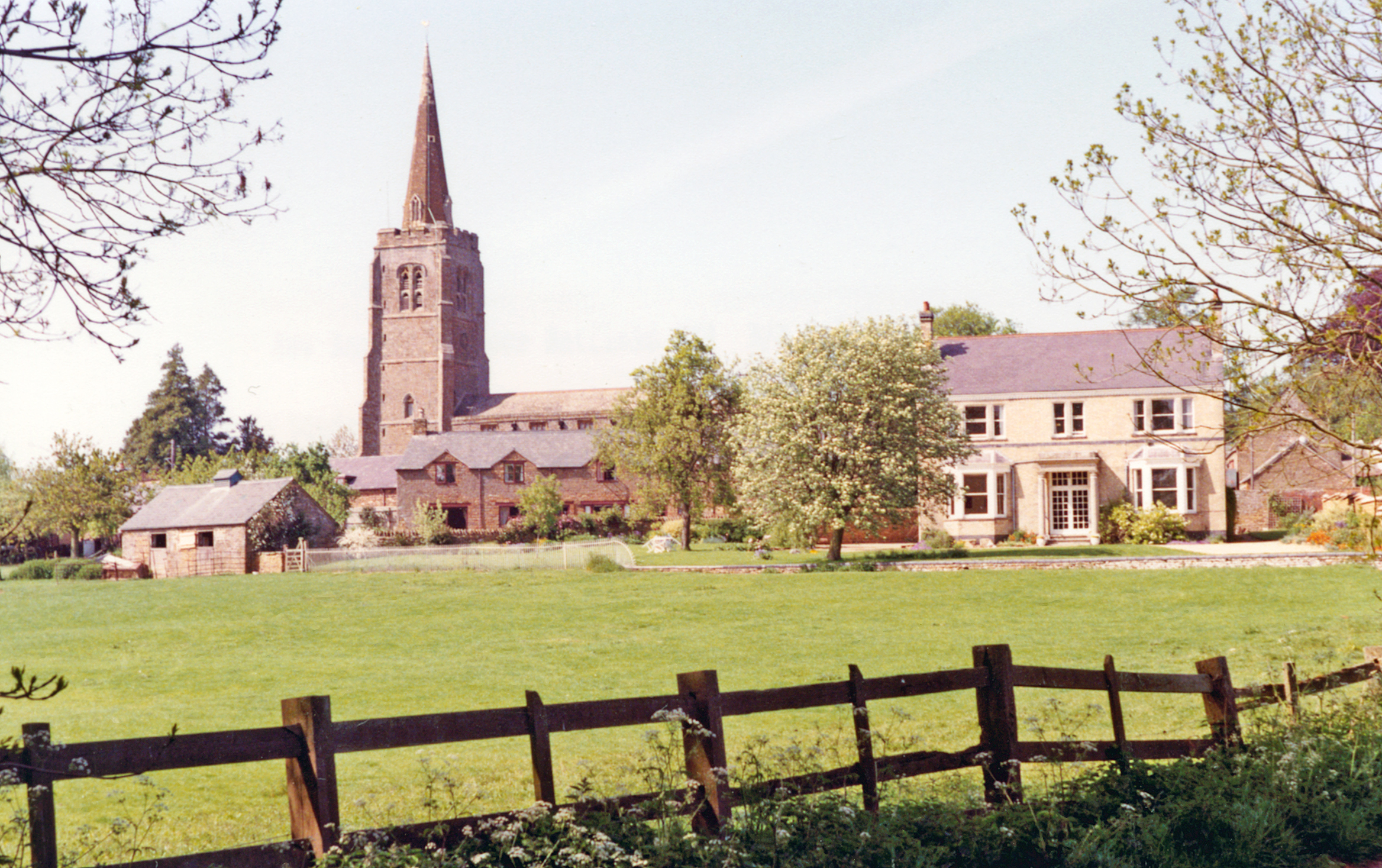
- Looking north to Byfield and Church of the Holy Cross, 1992

- Location within Northamptonshire
- Population: 1,277 (2011)
- OS grid reference: SP5153
- Unitary authority: West Northamptonshire
- Ceremonial county: Northamptonshire
- Region: East Midlands
- Country: England
- Sovereign state: United Kingdom
- Post town: Daventry
- Postcode district: NN11
- Dialling code: 01327
- Police: Northamptonshire
- Fire: Northamptonshire
- Ambulance: East Midlands
- UK Parliament: Daventry

Byfield is a village and civil parish in the West Northamptonshire unitary authority area of Northamptonshire, England. The population (including Westhorp) of the civil parish at the 2011 census was 1,277.

== History ==
The villages name means 'by the open land'. It has also been suggested that the first element is 'river-bend'.

Byfield, with Westhorp, was mentioned in the Domesday Book. It has been close to many of the important events in history. During the Wars of the Roses, in 1469 the battle of Edgecote took place, only three miles from Byfield. Likewise during the English Civil War, the battles of Edgehill in 1642 and Naseby in 1645 must have affected the local citizenry. In the Second World War the area around Byfield had numerous airfields and other military installations which would have had a considerable, and in some cases, long-lasting effect. One example of this is POW camp 87 which sits between Byfield and Upper Boddington, however the site is currently home to a scrap merchant; there are plans to convert the former camp into a recycling centre.

Byfield once had a station on the Stratford-upon-Avon and Midland Junction Railway (later part of the London, Midland and Scottish Railway), but this closed in April 1952. One of the platforms of the station is still visible on the original site, however it is heavily overgrown. The remains of the goods shed is still visible. Two of the three bridges are still in the village, one being on the Twistle and the other being on the main road towards Banbury on the A361. Byfield was also home to an ironstone railway; This railway closed in 1965 along with the SMJR network

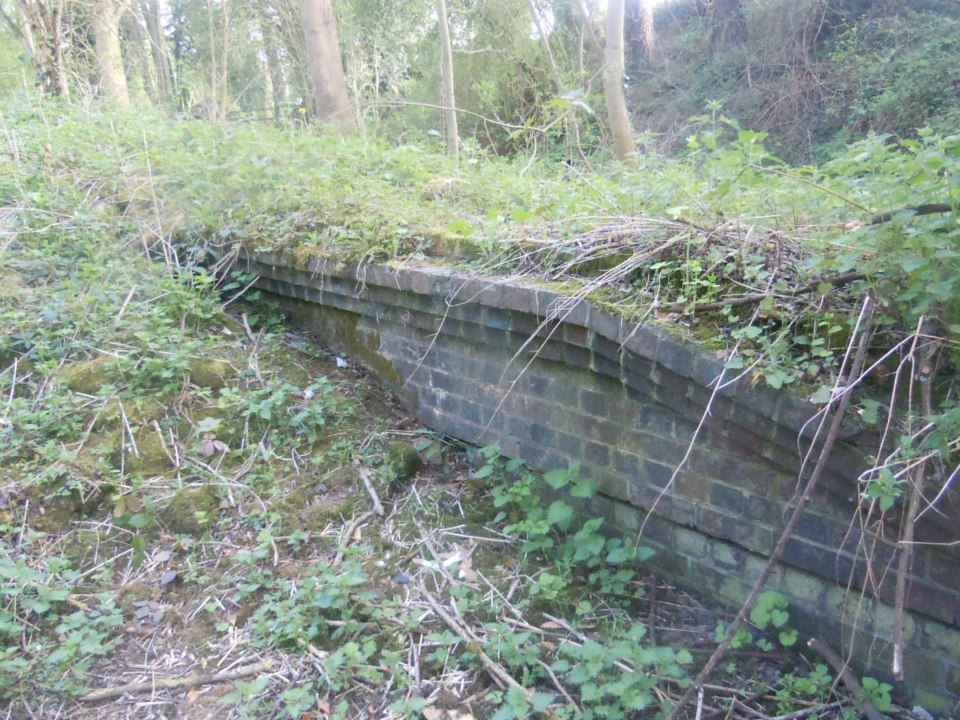
Byfield railway station platforms

Byfield was also the home of British folk-rock singer-songwriter Sandy Denny, and her husband Trevor Lucas, from 1974 until her death in 1978. A number of Sandy's demos issued since her death (most notably on the 2004 box set A Boxful of Treasures) were recorded at home in Byfield and in 2017 the BBC unveiled a plaque commemorating her last professional gig in Byfield Village Hall.

== Governance ==
Byfield has had a Parish Council continuously since 1894, and this continuity has meant that the parish is actively managed for the good of its residents.

== Demography ==
Byfield has a population of around 1,200-1,250 (1,252 in the 2001 census), increasing to 1,277 at the 2011 census. 1,032 electors (2007 Electoral Register) plus children. The Parish still has a high level of agriculture, as it has some 10 or so working farms, although like all modern farming they employ very few people. The other areas of employment are the usual modern mix of commuting, self-employed and people who have locally based jobs, often part-time.

== Recreation ==
There are some 30 different clubs and organisations active in Byfield such as karate, over 60s club and the men's breakfast club. Byfield has a large recreation ground, The Brightwell, which has bowls, cricket, football and tennis clubs as well as a children's playground and other recreational space. The village hall is the venue for a number of weekly events as well as one-off theatres, shows, exhibitions, quiz evenings, dances, weddings, parties etc.

Byfield Village Club which was formerly known as Byfield Conservative Club has a membership of over 200 and is the venue for live music, social events and parties. There are active darts and skittles teams as well as a full-size snooker table in the upstairs games room. The Village Club is housed in a former school house; the building itself being several hundred years old. The club went out of business in early 2017 and the building is up for sale.

An active Scout Group exists in the village which was first founded in 1911. Today it provides activities for approximately 60 young people aged 6–14.
