= Eastcote, Northamptonshire =

Village in Northamptonshire, England

Coordinates: 52.180513°N 1.006174°W

Eastcote
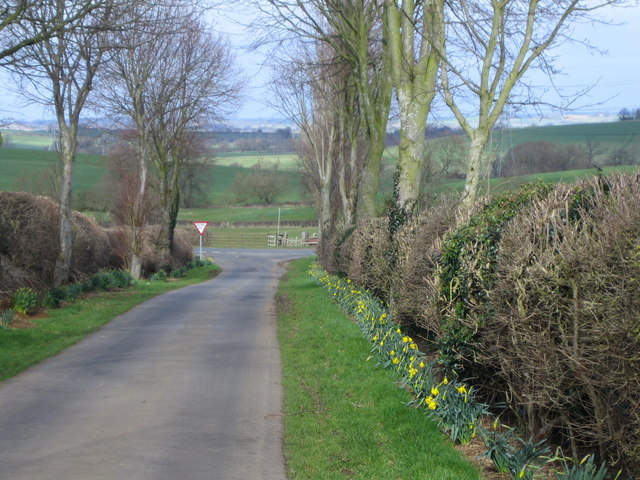
- Daffodils on Pound Lane, Eastcote. The "pound" was an enclosure for cattle to be penned in overnight while being driven on the hoof to Banbury market, often from as far away as Scotland

- Location within Northamptonshire
- OS grid reference: SP680540
- Civil parish: Pattishall
- Unitary authority: West Northamptonshire
- Ceremonial county: Northamptonshire
- Region: East Midlands
- Country: England
- Sovereign state: United Kingdom
- Post town: TOWCESTER
- Postcode district: NN12
- Dialling code: 01327
- Police: Northamptonshire
- Fire: Northamptonshire
- Ambulance: East Midlands
- UK Parliament: Daventry

Eastcote is a small village in the West Northamptonshire unitary authority area of Northamptonshire, England. It is about 7 miles (11.3 km) south-west of Northampton along Banbury Lane. It is close to the A5 road, the Roman Road known as Watling Street, about 4 miles (6.4 km) north-west of Towcester. Prior to the opening in the 1959 of the M1 motorway and the M6 motorway a little later, the A5 was the main route by road from London to north Wales and north-west England.

== Governance ==
The village is grouped with several other small villages into the parish council of the nearby larger village of Pattishall. It is governed by West Northamptonshire. Prior to local government changes in 2021 it the District Council was South Northamptonshire District Council where the village was part of Blakesley and Cote ward. This is a two-member ward currently both Conservative.

== History ==
Eastcote House stood in 60 acres and was owned by a Mr Gresham. The house was demolished around the middle of the 20th century. Just before the start of World War I, the house was sold as a retirement home to the National Sailor's and Firemen's Union of England as a retirement home. The Union decided that they would help German seaman and prepared an internment camp initially housing 50 men. However, the leader of the union was greatly upset by the fact that, after he had left the concert room where he had informed the internees about the sinking of the Lusitania on 7 May 1915 and the loss of fellow merchant navy sailors, they had started to sing German songs. The next morning the leader of the union held a meeting with the War Office resulting in the camp being handed over to the British Government and subsequently surrounded by barbed wire. Most of the internees were transferred out of the camp by July 1916. The camp became a POW camp expanding to about 4500 men by 1919 and was complete with a new water supply, sewage system, hospital, theatre and workshop. The village of Pattishall did not have electricity until the 1930s. After the war the property was sold by the union. There were periodic escapes: seven men escaped in 1917 but all were caught.
