= Upper Boddington =

Village in Northamptonshire, England

Coordinates: 52.178°N 1.298°W

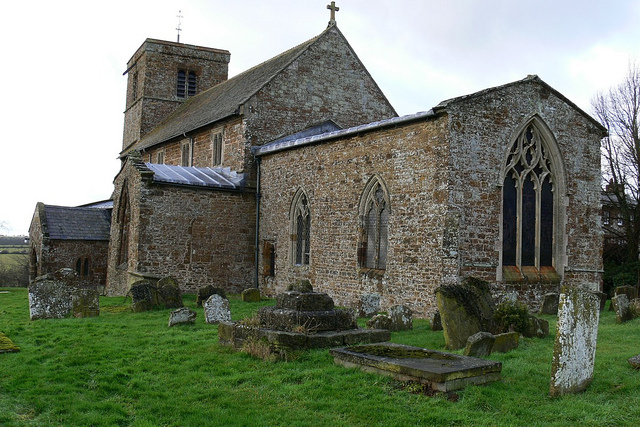
- St. John the Baptist

- Location within Northamptonshire
- Civil parish: Boddington
- Unitary authority: West Northamptonshire
- Ceremonial county: Northamptonshire
- Region: East Midlands
- Country: England
- Sovereign state: United Kingdom
- Post town: DAVENTRY
- Postcode district: NN11
- Dialling code: 01327
- Police: Northamptonshire
- Fire: Northamptonshire
- Ambulance: East Midlands
- UK Parliament: Daventry

Upper Boddington is a village and former civil parish, now in the parish of Boddington, in West Northamptonshire, England. In 1931 the parish had a population of 198. On 1 April 1935 the parish was abolished and merged with Lower Boddington to form "Boddington".

The village is located approximately 10 miles from Daventry, 12 miles from Banbury and 16 miles from Leamington Spa. Its far enough away from urban areas to maintain a rural village character, but close enough so that commuters have easy access to the M1 and M40 motorways .

The village's name means 'hill of Bota'.

The village has a number of community facilities and businesses that serve the local area: the Church of England Primary School, post office, the Plough Inn pub, a newly constructed village hall situated next to the playing fields, and Upper Boddington church. Upper Boddington is also home to successful motor racing team, Team GCR which in 2009 fielded a car in the FIA European GT4 Championship.

Local activities range from darts and skittles leagues at the Plough Inn, badminton matches and yoga classes at the village hall, a six-a-side football team playing in Napton and a classic car get-together every first Sunday of the month at the Village Garage. There is also a brand new cycle park in the village park.
