= South Northamptonshire =

Former local government district in England

Coordinates: 52.10°N 1.10°W

South Northamptonshire District
- Non-metropolitan district
- Shown within Northamptonshire
- Sovereign state: United Kingdom
- Constituent country: England
- Region: East Midlands
- Administrative county: Northamptonshire
- Founded: 1974
- Admin. HQ: Towcester

Government
  - Type: South Northamptonshire District Council
  - Leadership: Leader & Cabinet
  - Executive

Area
  - Total: 244.80 sq mi (634.02 km^{2})

Population (2019)
  - Total: 94,490
  - Density: 386.0/sq mi (149.0/km^{2})
- Time zone: UTC+0 (Greenwich Mean Time)
  - Summer (DST): UTC+1 (British Summer Time)
- ONS code: 34UG (ONS); E07000155 (GSS)
- Ethnicity: 98.4% White
- Website: southnorthants.gov.uk

South Northamptonshire was a local government district in Northamptonshire, England, from 1974 to 2021. Its council was based in the town of Towcester, first established as a settlement in Roman Britain. The population of the Local Authority District Council in 2011 was 85,189.

The largest town in the district was Brackley, which had a population of 14,000 in 2008, followed by Towcester, which had a population of nearly 10,000. Other significant settlements in size included Deanshanger, Bugbrooke, Roade, King's Sutton, Silverstone and Middleton Cheney. Many of the villages listed had populations exceeding 1,000. (Note: Such as Kislingbury, Potterspury and Yardley Gobion)

== Geography ==
=== Elevations and shape ===
The northern half of the district was generally higher than the south, reaching 192m AOD northeast of the centre of Aston-le-Walls, and 182m on the road east of Culworth, a village which also rests on top of the ridge following the general WSW line of the county and of the district but except for this is north of the district. This ridge is part of the Jurassic Way. (Note: On the third main ridge of Oolitic limestone in Britain (other than the Cotswolds and the North York Moors)) Lower parts are at 85m AOD (above mean sea level) in the southwest corner (Note: The border here in the southwest is the River Cherwell) and 50 m (160 ft) AOD in the northeast. (Note: The border here in the northeast is the River Nene after it has flowed through Northampton)

The district was shaped approximately like the Christian cross in an ENE orientation extending from its top at the southeast of Northampton and reaching to a north–south line south-by-southeast of Banbury, Oxfordshire. An additional arm near its foot reached north through the large village of Chipping Warden to Upper Boddington.

=== Soil and geology ===
Land was taken up with for the most part with arable agriculture peppered by villages, however allows space for two towns of significant size. Supporting this is a regular interspersion of two high fertility types of soil for most plants and crops: freely draining slightly acid but base-rich; and lime-rich loamy and clayey soils with impeded drainage soils, on a default (generally slightly lower) soil of slowly permeable seasonally wet slightly acid but base-rich loamy and clayey soils (of medium fertility). The district in terms of watercourses had sources and headwaters of the rivers Cherwell, Great Ouse and Nene.

=== Whittlewood Forest ===
Whittlewood Forest occupies a modest area for a forest and is broken up by fields (in the southern arm close to Milton Keynes which reaches to the Great Ouse) and this surrounds Whittlebury, the fields south of the upland village of Paulerspury on straight, Roman Watling Street which passes through the forest. This lies between Silverstone and Potterspury (also with a conservation area on Watling Street) or equally between Deanshanger and Towcester.

== Demography and human geography ==
With just over 79,293 people in 2000 and 91,000 in 2008, a 14.8% increase.

The growth in population between 2001 and 2007 was the third largest of all districts in the country and consisted of 35,700 households.

The district was notable for the proportion of and growth in detached houses, and the district was one of a tiny proportion to have seen a growth in the proportion of this type of home relative to other types between 2001 and 2011.

== History ==
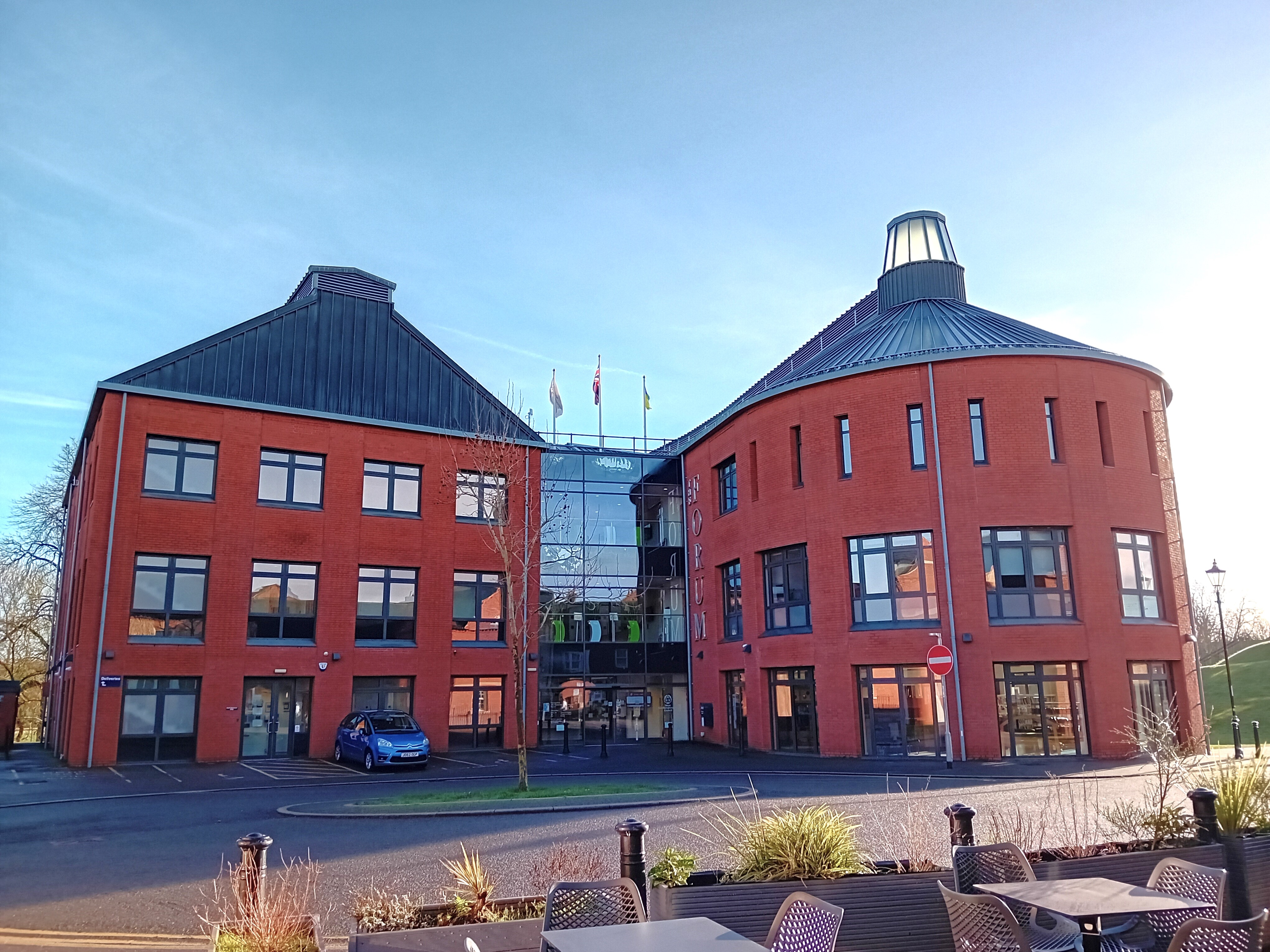
The Forum, Towcester: Council's headquarters from 2015 until its abolition.

The district was formed on 1 April 1974, under the Local Government Act 1972, and was a merger of the municipal borough of Brackley, along with Brackley Rural District, Towcester Rural District, and most of Northampton Rural District.

The council chose to base itself in Towcester. It was initially based itself at Towcester Town Hall, which had been built in 1865 and had been bought by Towcester Rural District Council in 1935. The council moved to a new building at the junction of Springfields and Brackley Road in 1982, which in turn was replaced by another new building called The Forum on Moat Lane in 2015.

== Abolition and replacement ==
In March 2018 at Northamptonshire County Council, following financial and cultural mismanagement by the cabinet and officers, the then Secretary of State for Local Government, Sajid Javid, sent commissioner Max Caller into the council, who recommended the county council and all district and borough councils in the county be abolished, and replaced by two unitary authorities, one covering the West, and one the North of the county. These proposals were approved in April 2019. It meant that the districts of Daventry, Northampton and South Northamptonshire were merged to form a new unitary authority called West Northamptonshire, whilst the second unitary authority North Northamptonshire consists of Corby, East Northamptonshire, Kettering and Wellingborough districts. These new authorities came into being on 1 April 2021. Elections for the new authorities were due to be held on 7 May 2020, but were delayed due to the COVID-19 pandemic.

== Settlements and parishes ==
For a county-wide list for Northamptonshire see List of places in Northamptonshire.

- Abthorpe, Adstone, Ashton, Aston le Walls, Astrop, Aynho
- Blakesley, Blisworth, Boddington, Brackley, Bradden, Brafield-on-the-Green, Bugbrooke
- Caldecote, Castle Ashby, Chacombe, Charlton, Chipping Warden, Cogenhoe, Cold Higham, Cosgrove, Courteenhall, Croughton, Culworth
- Deanshanger, Denton
- Easton Neston, Edgcote, Evenley, Eydon
- Farthinghoe
- Gayton, Grafton Regis, Grange Park, Greatworth, Greens Norton, Grimscote
- Hackleton, Harpole, Hartwell, Helmdon, Hinton-in-the-Hedges
- King's Sutton, Kislingbury
- Litchborough, Little Houghton
- Maidford, Marston St Lawrence, Middleton Cheney, Milton Malsor, Moreton Pinkney
- Nether Heyford, Newbottle
- Old Stratford, Overthorpe
- Pattishall, Paulerspury, Potterspury
- Quinton
- Radstone, Roade, Rothersthorpe
- Shutlanger, Silverstone, Slapton, Stoke Bruerne, Sulgrave, Syresham
- Thenford, Thorpe Mandeville, Tiffield, Towcester
- Upper Heyford
- Wappenham, Warkworth, Weedon Lois, Weston, Whiston, Whitfield, Whittlebury, Wicken, Woodend
- Yardley Gobion, Yardley Hastings

=== Map of civil parishes in 1974 ===
Civil parishes of South Northamptonshire upon its formation in 1974

The following changes to civil parishes took place during the district's history:

- 23 January 1980: Cogenhoe renamed Cogenhoe and Whiston.
- 1 April 2000: Overthorpe created out of Middleton Cheney.
- 15 October 2001: Grange Park created out of Courteenhall and Quinton.
- 1 April 2004: Alderton created out of Grafton Regis.
- 1 October 2008: Chipping Warden and Edgcote created by the merger of Chipping Warden and Edgcote.
- 1 April 2019: Greatworth renamed Greatworth and Halse.

== Gallery ==
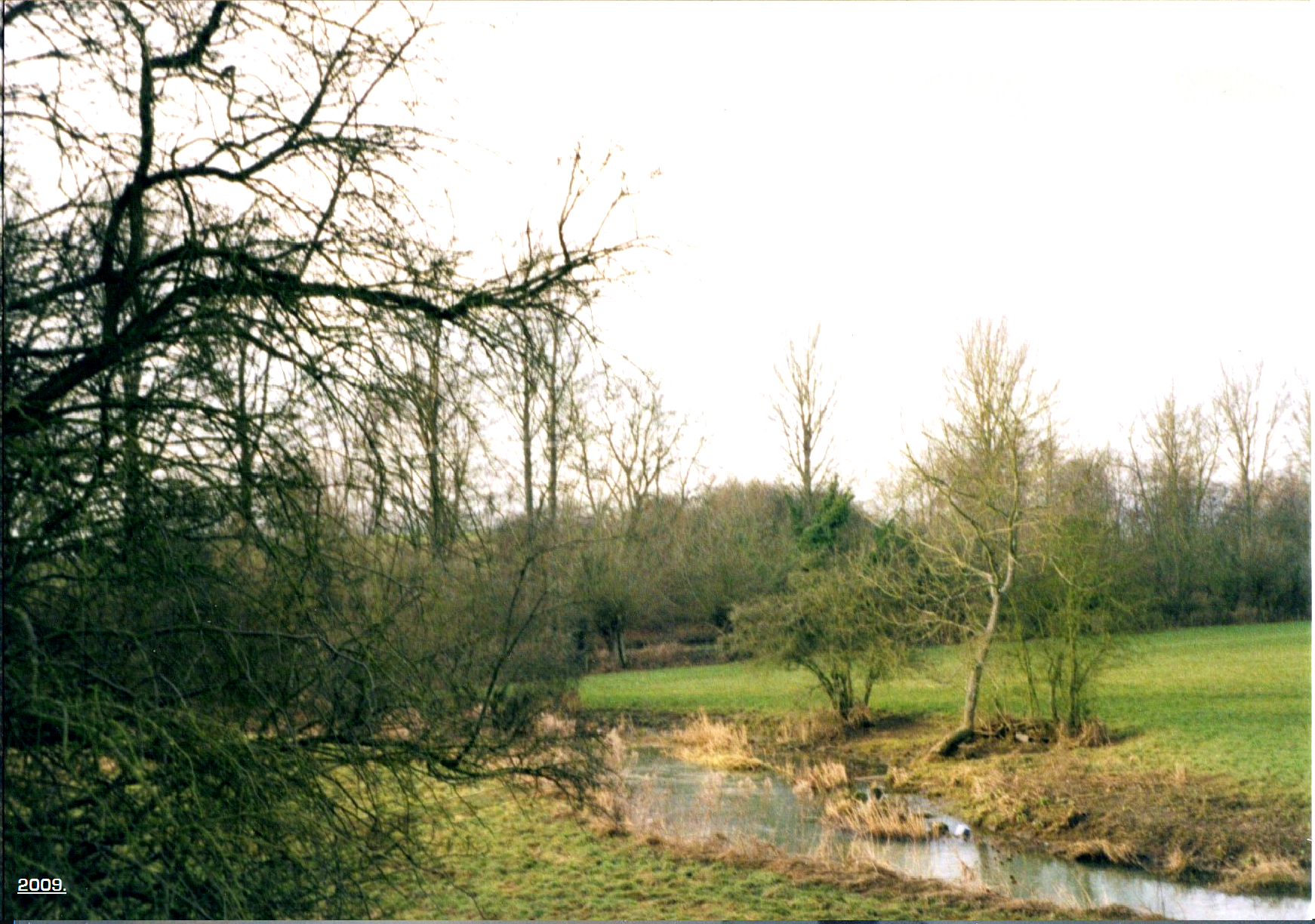
Farmland outside the village of King's Sutton in Northamptonshire in 2009.

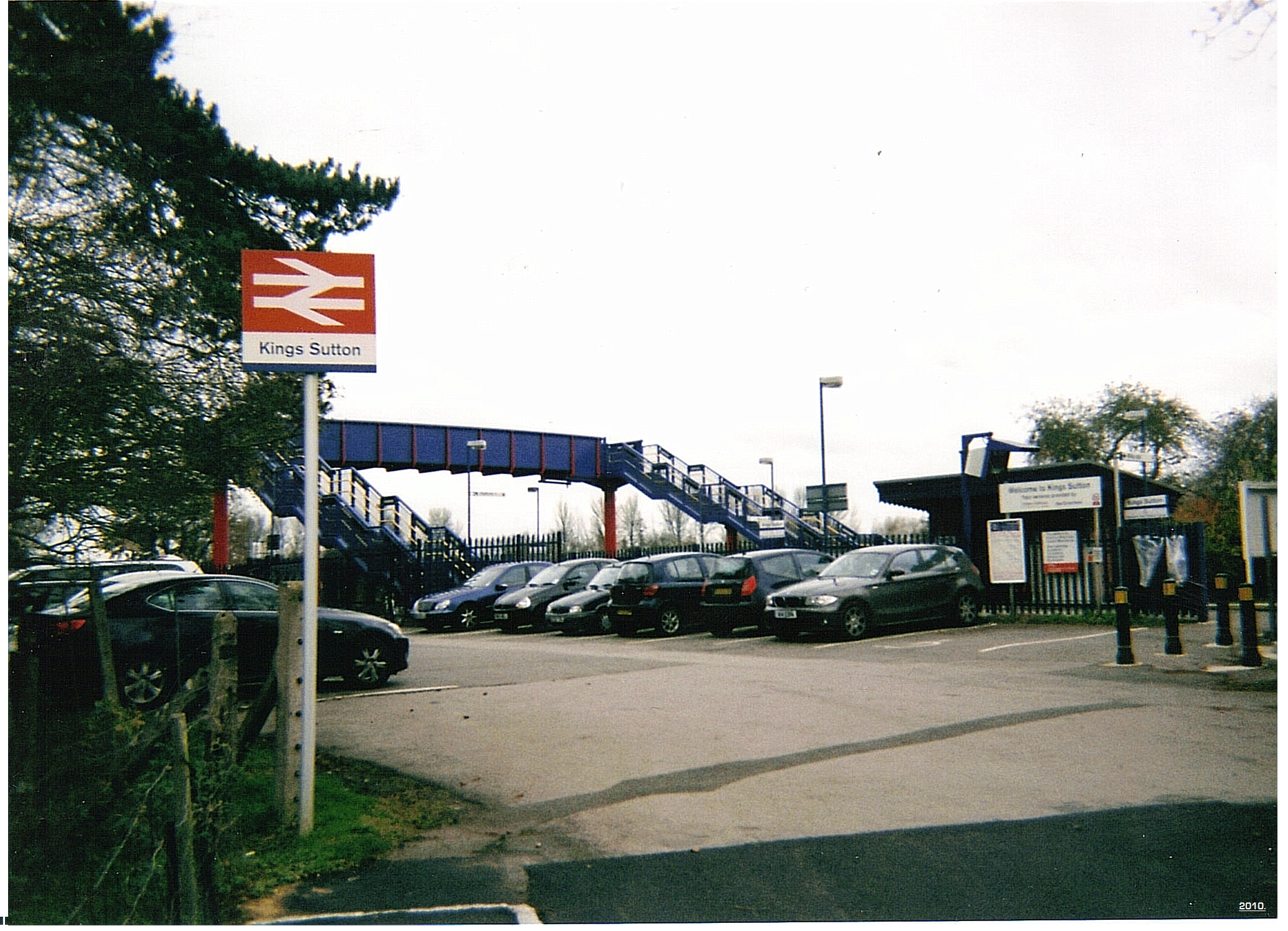
King's Sutton railway station was upgraded and re-gained its footbridge in 2009.

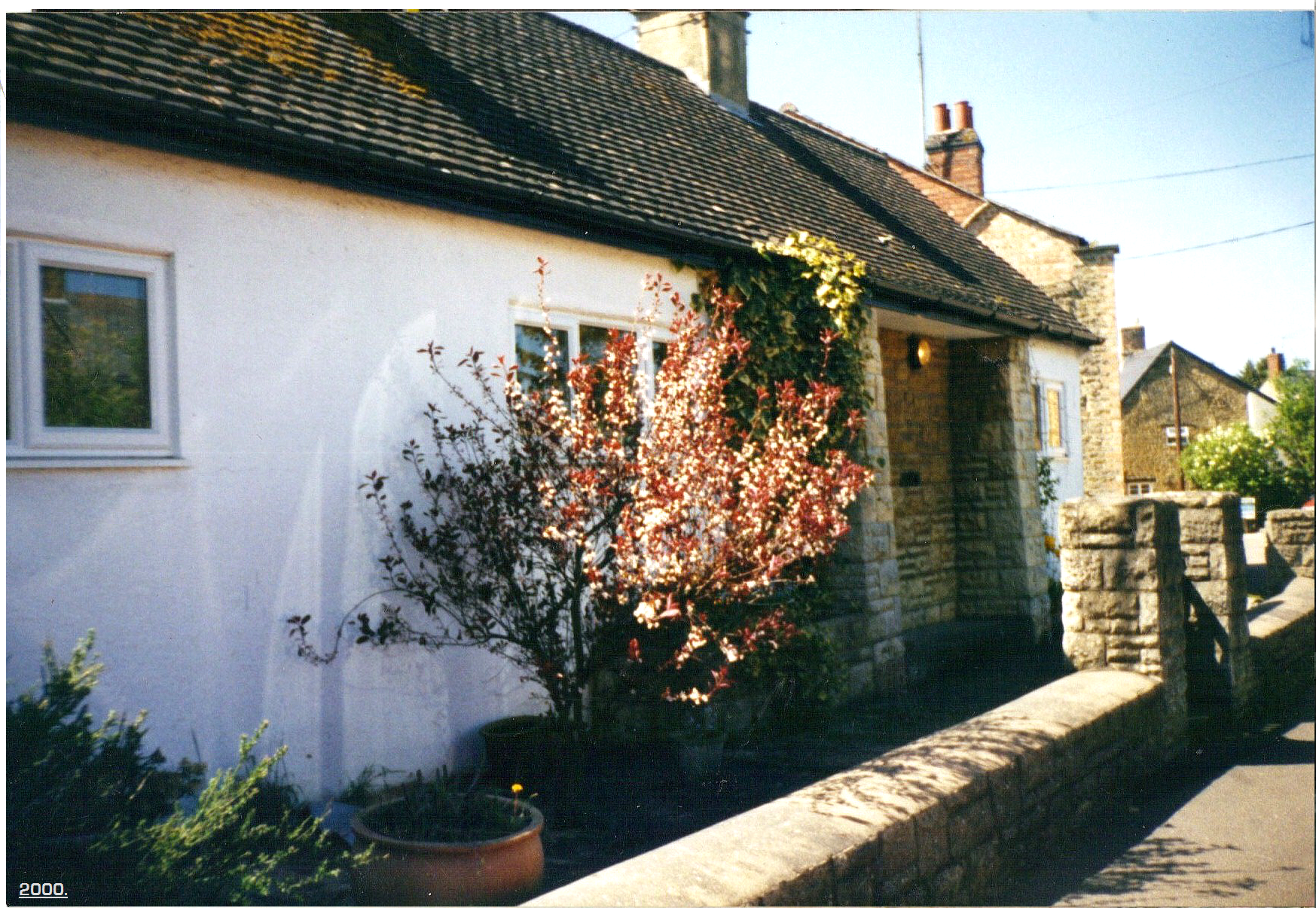
A picture of King' Sutton in 2000.

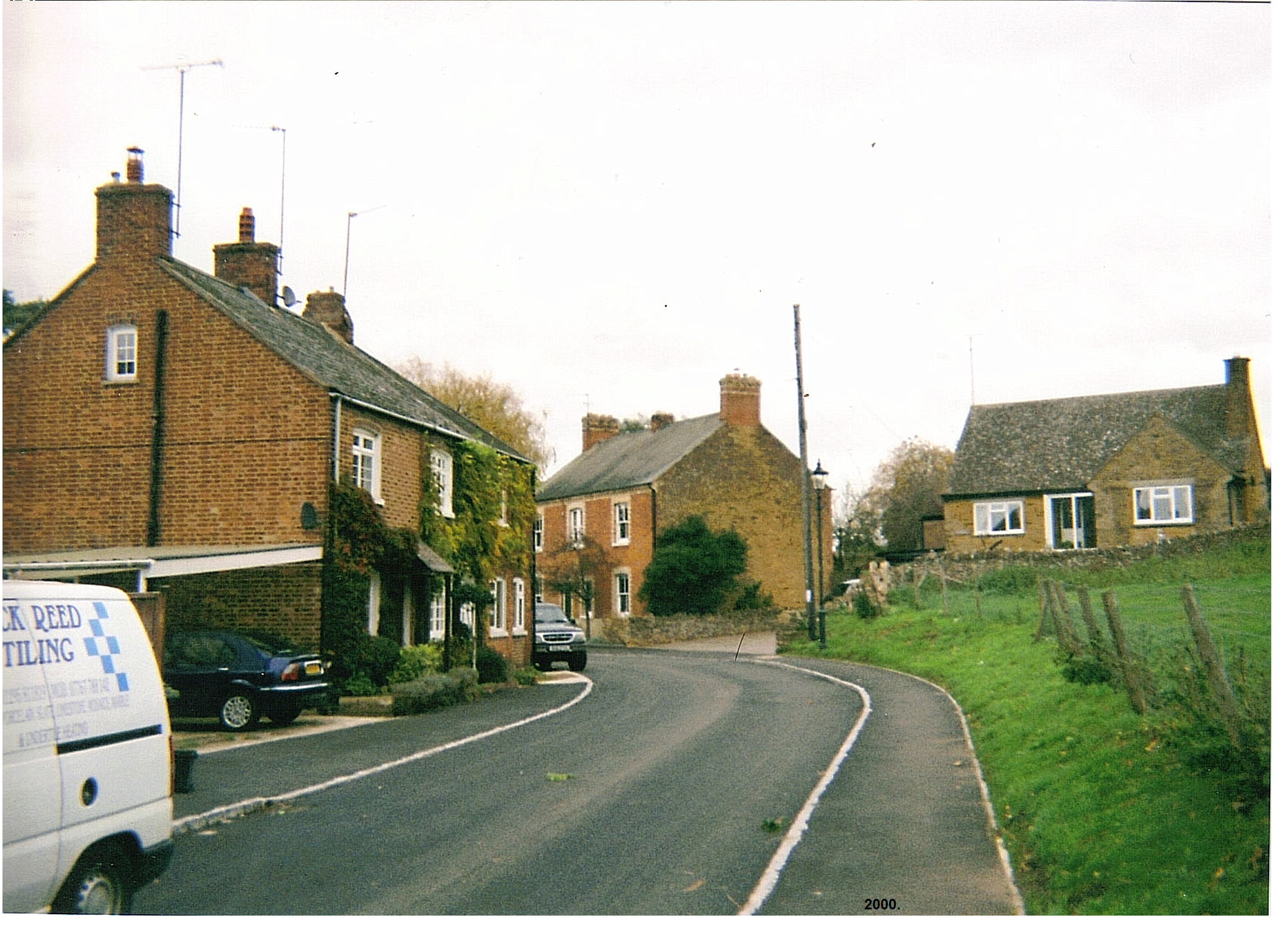
A picture of King's Sutton in 2000.

== Museum ==
Towcester Museum

== Arms ==
Coat of arms of South Northamptonshire

Crest
On a wreath of colours out of a coronet Or a cock's head Gules combed and wattled Or the whole between two roses Gules barbed and seeded Proper.
Escutcheon
Azure a lion rampant within an orle of garbs Or.
Motto
Hora E Sempere (Now And Always)

== See also ==
- South Northamptonshire local elections
- Grade I listed buildings in South Northamptonshire
- Grade II* listed buildings in South Northamptonshire

== Notes and references ==
Notes
