= South Northamptonshire District Council elections =

Local government elections in Northamptonshire, England

South Northamptonshire District Council in Northamptonshire, England was elected every four years. After the last boundary changes in 2007, 42 councillors were elected from 27 wards. The council was abolished in 2021, with the area becoming part of West Northamptonshire.

== Political control ==
The first election was held in 1973. The council then acted as a shadow authority alongside the outgoing authorities until 1 April 1974 when it formally came into being. From 1974 until its abolition in 2021, political control of the council was as follows:

Party in control	Years
No overall control	1974–1979
Conservative	1979–1995
No overall control	1995–1999
Conservative	1999–2021

=== Leadership ===
The leaders of the council from 1999 until the council's abolition in 2021 were:

Councillor	Party	From	To
Sandra Barnes	Conservative	1999	2010
Mary Clarke	Conservative	2010	May 2015
Ian McCord	Conservative	20 May 2015	31 Mar 2021

== Council elections ==
- 1973 South Northamptonshire District Council election
- 1976 South Northamptonshire District Council election (New ward boundaries)
- 1979 South Northamptonshire District Council election
- 1983 South Northamptonshire District Council election
- 1987 South Northamptonshire District Council election
- 1991 South Northamptonshire District Council election (District boundary changes took place but the number of seats remained the same)
- 1995 South Northamptonshire District Council election
- 1999 South Northamptonshire District Council election (New ward boundaries increased the number of seats by 2)
- 2003 South Northamptonshire District Council election
- 2007 South Northamptonshire District Council election (New ward boundaries)
- 2011 South Northamptonshire District Council election
- 2015 South Northamptonshire District Council election

== Results maps ==
2003 results map

2007 results map

2011 results map

2015 results map

== By-election results ==
=== 1995-1999 ===
Forest By-Election 31 October 1996
Party	Candidate	Votes	%	±%
Independent		280	51.3	
Conservative		266	48.7	
Majority		14	2.6	
Turnout		546	30.8	
Independent gain from Liberal Democrats		Swing		

Roade By-Election 2 October 1997
Party	Candidate	Votes	%	±%
Labour		241	54.0	+12.7
Conservative		205	46.0	+24.0
Majority		36	8.0	
Turnout		446	21.5	
Labour hold		Swing		

Bugbrooke By-Election 4 December 1997
Party	Candidate	Votes	%	±%
Conservative		296	65.5	
Labour		156	34.5	
Majority		140	31.0	
Turnout		452	22.1	
Conservative hold		Swing		

Deanshanger By-Election 2 July 1998
Party	Candidate	Votes	%	±%
Labour		335	52.5	−2.6
Conservative		303	47.5	+29.2
Majority		32	5.0	
Turnout		638		
Labour hold		Swing		

=== 1999-2003 ===
Courteenhall By-Election 7 June 2001
Party	Candidate	Votes	%	±%
Conservative		678	39.0	−25.0
Labour		555	31.9	−4.1
Independent		329	18.9	+18.9
Liberal Democrats		177	10.2	+10.2
Majority		123	7.1	
Turnout		1,739		
Conservative hold		Swing		

Middleton Cheney By-Election 7 June 2001
Party	Candidate	Votes	%	±%
Conservative		981	53.7	+11.3
Labour		845	46.3	−11.3
Majority		136	7.4	
Turnout		1,826		
Conservative gain from Labour		Swing		

Yardley By-Election 7 June 2001
Party	Candidate	Votes	%	±%
Conservative		613	65.5	+8.6
Labour		323	34.5	−8.6
Majority		290	31.0	
Turnout		936		
Conservative gain from Labour		Swing		

Salcey By-Election 4 October 2001
Party	Candidate	Votes	%	±%
Conservative		167	60.5	+3.0
Labour		109	39.5	−3.0
Majority		58	21.0	
Turnout		276	20.5	
Conservative hold		Swing		

=== 2003-2007 ===
Courteenhall By-Election 25 September 2003
Party	Candidate	Votes	%	±%
Conservative		513	59.2	+9.9
Liberal Democrats		215	24.8	+8.7
Labour		139	16.0	−3.6
Majority		298	34.4	
Turnout		867	23.0	
Conservative hold		Swing		

Cogenhoe By-Election 14 July 2005
Party	Candidate	Votes	%	±%
Independent		260	49.1	
Conservative		226	42.7	
Labour		43	8.1	
Majority		34	6.4	
Turnout		529		
Independent gain from Conservative		Swing		

=== 2007-2011 ===
Grange Park By-Election 12 February 2009
Party	Candidate	Votes	%	±%
Conservative	Paul Farrow	407	76.1	−23.9
Liberal Democrats	Shaun Hope	128	23.9	+23.9
Majority		279	52.1	
Turnout		535	19.2	
Conservative hold		Swing		

=== 2011-2015 ===
Towcester Brook By-Election 9 February 2012
Party	Candidate	Votes	%	±%
Liberal Democrats	Lisa Samiotis	774	59.4	+15.5
Conservative	John Gasking	401	30.8	−11.7
UKIP	Peter Conquest	129	9.9	−3.7
Majority		373	28.6	
Turnout		1,304		
Liberal Democrats gain from Conservative		Swing		

Grange Park By-Election 28 June 2012
Party	Candidate	Votes	%	±%
Conservative	Tharik Jainu-Deen	313	76.2	+0.1
Liberal Democrats	Shaun Hope	98	23.8	−0.1
Majority		215	52.3	
Turnout		412	13.4	−5.8
Conservative hold		Swing		

Grange Park By-Election 2 October 2014 (2 seats)
Party	Candidate	Votes	%	±%
Conservative	Simon Clifford	433		
Conservative	Adil Sadygov	313		
Labour	Ian Grant	151		
UKIP	Peter Conquest	100		
UKIP	Katie Chick	84		
Conservative hold		Swing		
Conservative hold		Swing		

=== 2015-2021 ===
Old Stratford By-Election 22 September 2016
Party	Candidate	Votes	%	±%
Conservative	Ken Pritchard	369	77.2	N/A
UKIP	Rose Gibbins	109	22.8	N/A
Majority		260	54.4	
Turnout		478		
Conservative hold		Swing		

Grange Park By-Election 1 December 2016
Party	Candidate	Votes	%	±%
Conservative	Andrew Grant	244	58.4	−13.0
Labour	Ian Grant	105	25.1	−3.5
UKIP	Rose Gibbins	49	11.7	+11.7
Green	Andy Clarke	20	4.8	+4.8
Majority		139	33.3	
Turnout		418		
Conservative hold		Swing		

Kings Sutton By-Election 4 May 2017
Party	Candidate	Votes	%	±%
Conservative	Gregor Hopkins	470	67.0	+4.2
Labour	Michael Bailey	232	33.0	−4.2
Majority		238	34.0	
Turnout		702		
Conservative hold		Swing		

Middleton Cheney By-Election 12 April 2018
Party	Candidate	Votes	%	±%
Conservative	Jonathan Riley	391	42.1	−21.6
Liberal Democrats	Mark Allen	316	34.1	+34.1
Labour	Richard Solesbury-Timms	183	19.7	+19.7
Green	Adam Sear	38	4.1	+4.1
Majority		75	8.1	
Turnout		928		
Conservative hold		Swing		

Astwell By-Election 21 June 2018
Party	Candidate	Votes	%	±%
Conservative	Paul Wiltshire	319	76.9	−0.9
Labour	Richard Solesbury-Timms	96	23.1	+0.9
Majority		223	53.7	
Turnout		415		
Conservative hold		Swing		

Whittlewood By-Election 21 June 2018
Party	Candidate	Votes	%	±%
Liberal Democrats	Abigail Medina	366	56.7	N/A
Conservative	Martin Barter	236	36.5	N/A
Labour	Adrian Scandrett	44	6.8	N/A
Majority		130	20.1	
Turnout		646		
Liberal Democrats gain from Conservative		Swing		

Middleton Cheney By-Election 12 September 2019
Party	Candidate	Votes	%	±%
Liberal Democrats	Mark Allen	384	43.8	+9.7
Conservative	Alison Eastwood	345	39.3	−2.8
Green	Adam Sear	89	10.1	+6.0
Labour	Arthur Greaves	59	6.7	−13.0
Majority		39	4.4	
Turnout		877		
Liberal Democrats gain from Conservative		Swing		
