= Kislingbury =

Village in Northamptonshire, England

Coordinates: 52.229355°N 0.979027°W

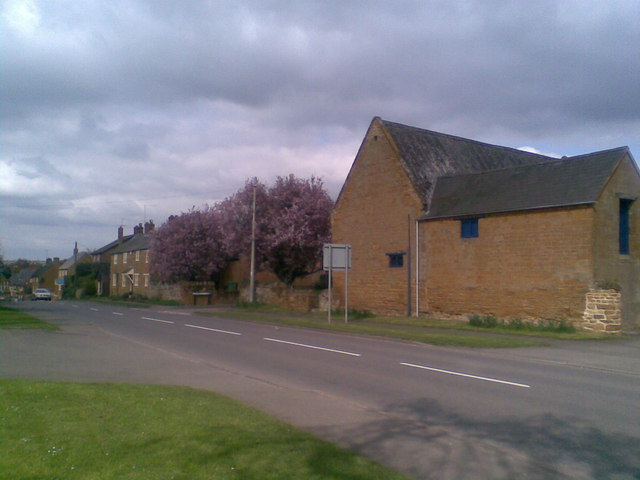
- High Street

- Location within Northamptonshire
- Population: 1,221 (2001 census) 1,237 2011 census
- OS grid reference: SP697594
  - London: 69 miles (111 km)
- Civil parish: Kislingbury
- Unitary authority: West Northamptonshire
- Ceremonial county: Northamptonshire
- Region: East Midlands
- Country: England
- Sovereign state: United Kingdom
- Post town: NORTHAMPTON
- Postcode district: NN7
- Dialling code: 01604
- Police: Northamptonshire
- Fire: Northamptonshire
- Ambulance: East Midlands
- UK Parliament: Daventry

Kislingbury is a village in Northamptonshire, England, about 4 miles (6 km) west of Northampton town centre, and close to junctions 15A and 16 of the M1 motorway.

== Etymology ==
The village's name origin is uncertain. 'At the gravelly-place fortification' or perhaps, 'at the fortification of Cysel's people'.

== Demographics ==
2001 census data shows 1,221 people resident in the Parish Council area consisting of 591 males and 630 females, in 497 household of which 79.5% were owner occupied or being purchased with a mortgage. At the 2011 census the population had increased to 1,237.

== Governance ==
The village is currently governed by West Northamptonshire council. Prior to local government changes in 2021 it was in the district council area of South Northamptonshire where it was part of Harpole and Grange ward, together with the parishes of Milton Malsor, Harpole, Rothersthorpe and Gayton. It was within the area of Northamptonshire County Council and is in the Parliamentary Constituency of Daventry. Prior to the 2010 General Election the village was in Northampton South constituency.

== Transport ==
The A4500 main road runs just north of the village. The M1 London to Yorkshire motorway between junctions 15a and 16 passes and makes its presence known, close to the south west of the village, and junction 16 is just two miles distant. While the D3 bus service runs through the village every 1 and a half hour.

== Facilities ==
The village has three pub/restaurants, the most well-known being the Cromwell Cottage near the river, which has a tenuous historical connection with Oliver Cromwell: Parliamentarian forces spent a night nearby en route to the Battle of Naseby in 1645. The others are the Old Red Lion along the High Street and The Sun Inn on Mill Road.

== Surroundings ==
The River Nene flows past the village close by to the north, through an old, narrow bridge – narrow, that is, for both vehicles and the river which frequently floods. The most recent serious incident in 1998 caused flood damage to several houses in the village. Some flood attenuation work has since been carried out but it remains to be seen if this proves adequate. The village carries heavy traffic being on a route to the larger village of Bugbrooke with the large Campion Secondary School which serves the village and a large catchment area around. Heavy vehicles from sand quarries in the area and also Heygates Flour Mill also use the village main road. The village is on the same side of the motorway as the urban area of Northampton. It is considered slowly getting closer with developments to the western side of the town.

== See also ==
- Seatonian Prize
