= Dallington Heath =

Heath in Northamptonshire, England

Coordinates: 52°16′8″N 0°56′40″W

- Location within Northamptonshire
- OS grid reference: SP 72123 63947
- Unitary authority: West Northamptonshire
- Ceremonial county: Northamptonshire
- Region: East Midlands
- Country: England
- Sovereign state: United Kingdom
- Police: Northamptonshire
- Fire: Northamptonshire
- Ambulance: East Midlands

Dallington Heath is a heath in the West Northamptonshire district, in the ceremonial county of Northamptonshire, England, notable for its complex of crop marks.
