= Ashton, West Northamptonshire =

Village in Northamptonshire, England

Coordinates: 52.1421°N 0.8806°W

Ashton
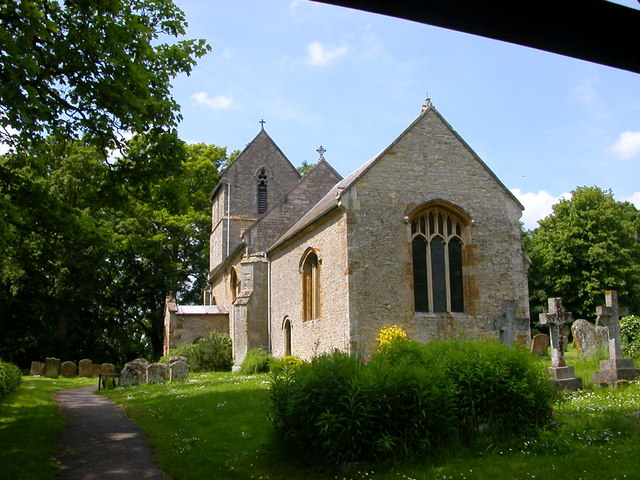
- St Michael and All Angels

- Location within Northamptonshire
- Population: 389 (2001 Census); 395 (2011).
- OS grid reference: SP767499
  - London: 67 miles (107.8 km)
- Unitary authority: West Northamptonshire
- Ceremonial county: Northamptonshire
- Region: East Midlands
- Country: England
- Sovereign state: United Kingdom
- Post town: Northampton
- Postcode district: NN7
- Dialling code: 01604
- Police: Northamptonshire
- Fire: Northamptonshire
- Ambulance: East Midlands
- UK Parliament: Northampton South

Ashton is a village in West Northamptonshire about 1 mile (1.6 km) southeast of Roade village close to the Northampton to Milton Keynes A508, ca.3 miles (5 km) south of junction 15 of the M1 motorway, 6 miles (10 km) south of Northampton and 11 miles (18 km) north of Milton Keynes. The population of the civil parish at the 2011 census was 395. The village is about 67 miles (107.8 km) north of London via the M1 junction 15. The West Coast Main Line intersects the village on its eastern side.

The villages name means 'At the ash-trees'.

== Governance ==
The village has a Parish Council and the Ashton website publishes name of councillors and their proceedings.

== Notable buildings ==
The church is dedicated to St Michael with the oldest parts 13th and 14th century. It was extensively restored in 1895. There are various monuments:

- Sir Philip de Lou (d.14th century)
- Sir John de Herteshull (c.1365)
- Robert Marriot (d.1584) and his family

The village has a single Church of England primary school: Ashton C of E Primary School.
