= Woodend, Northamptonshire =

Village in Northamptonshire, England

Coordinates: 52.1368°N 1.1017°W

Woodend
- Location within Northamptonshire
- Population: 322 (2011 census)
- OS grid reference: SP615491
  - London: 69 miles (111 km)
- Civil parish: Woodend
- Unitary authority: West Northamptonshire
- Ceremonial county: Northamptonshire
- Region: East Midlands
- Country: England
- Sovereign state: United Kingdom
- Post town: TOWCESTER
- Postcode district: NN12
- Police: Northamptonshire
- Fire: Northamptonshire
- Ambulance: East Midlands

Woodend is a small village in West Northamptonshire, England.

The village's name means 'at the end of the wood'.

It is 6 miles (9.7 km) west of the town of Towcester and was a hamlet in the parish of Blakesley until 1866, when it became a parish in its own right. After World War I it was designated a "thankful village", all of the soldiers it sent to war having returned safely. The population of the village at the 2011 Census was 322. The village is featured on Darren Hayman's album, Thankful Villages Volume 2.

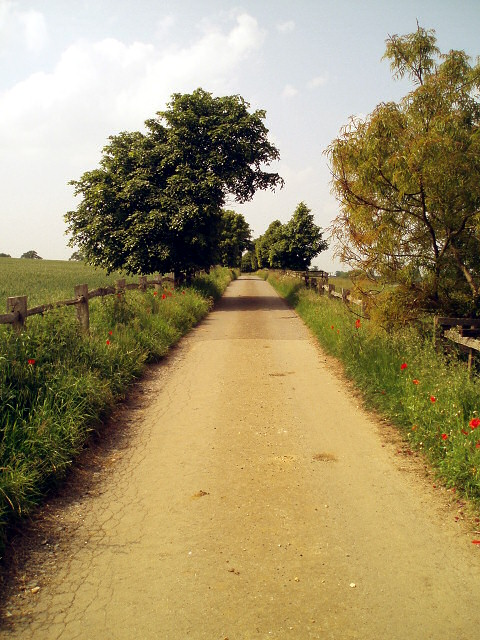
Lane from Green's Park

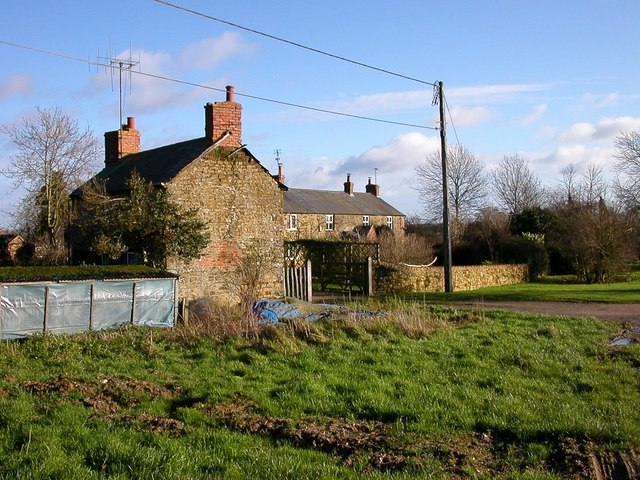
Woodend Cottages

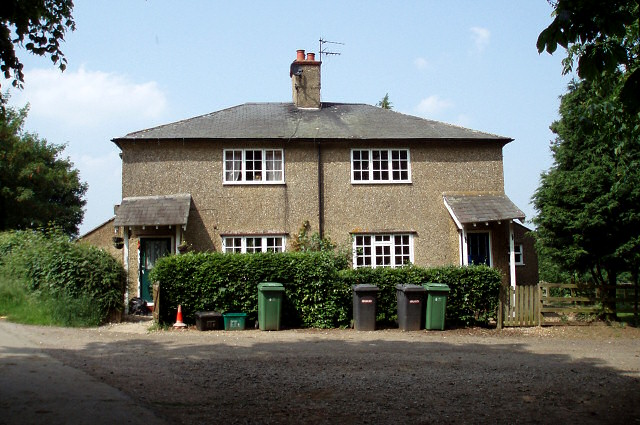
Houses at Green's Park

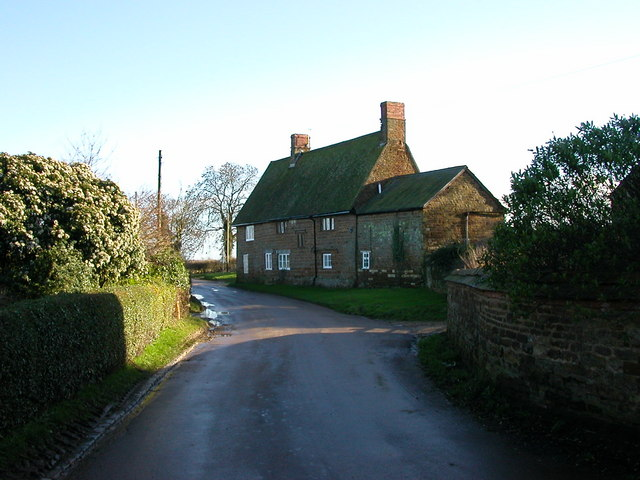
Heading out of the Village towards Blakesley

There is a Barrow about 250 yards east of Green's Park Farm.
