= Caldecote, Northamptonshire =

Hamlet in Northamptonshire, England

Coordinates: 52.154°N 0.997°W

Caldecote
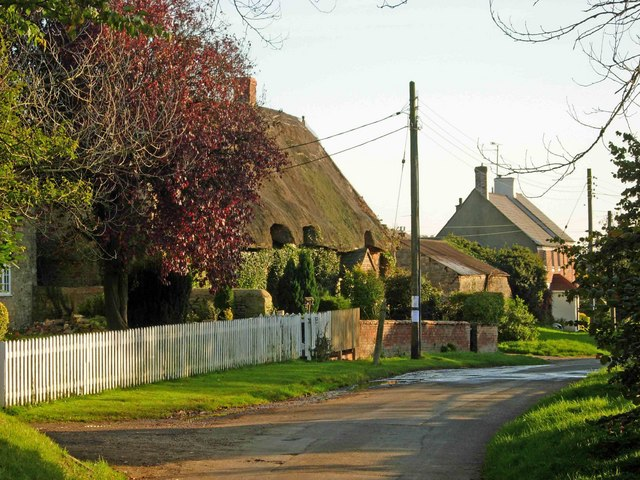
- Caldecote

- Location within Northamptonshire
- Population: 38 (est.2010)
- OS grid reference: SP687511
  - London: 66 miles (106 km)
- Unitary authority: West Northamptonshire
- Ceremonial county: Northamptonshire
- Region: East Midlands
- Country: England
- Sovereign state: United Kingdom
- Post town: TOWCESTER
- Postcode district: NN12
- Dialling code: 01327
- Police: Northamptonshire
- Fire: Northamptonshire
- Ambulance: East Midlands
- UK Parliament: South Northamptonshire

Caldecote is a hamlet in Northamptonshire, England, about 1 mile (1.6 km) north of Towcester.
