= Rothersthorpe =

Village in Northamptonshire, England

Coordinates: 52.201685°N 0.953670°W

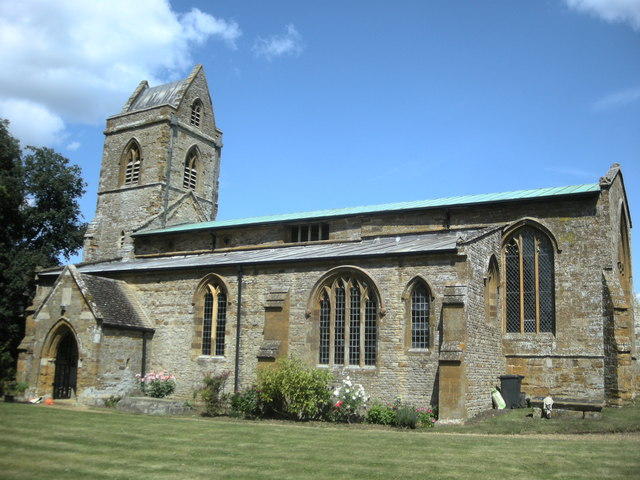
- Church of SS Peter and St Paul

- Location within Northamptonshire
- Population: 500 (2001 Census) 472 (2011 Census)
- OS grid reference: SP694570
  - London: 66 miles (106 km)
- Civil parish: Rothersthorpe
- Unitary authority: West Northamptonshire
- Ceremonial county: Northamptonshire
- Region: East Midlands
- Country: England
- Sovereign state: United Kingdom
- Post town: NORTHAMPTON
- Postcode district: NN7
- Dialling code: 01604
- Police: Northamptonshire
- Fire: Northamptonshire
- Ambulance: East Midlands
- UK Parliament: Daventry

Rothersthorpe is a small village of medieval origin, in West Northamptonshire, England, with a population of 500 in the 2001 Census, reducing to 472 at the 2011 census. It is 4 miles (6 km) from the town of Northampton.

== Governance ==
The village is currently governed by West Northamptonshire council. Before local government changes in 2021 the village was in the area of South Northamptonshire District Council and Harpole and Grange ward, together with the villages of Milton Malsor, Gayton, Harpole and Kislingbury. The ward had a total population of 1,721 in the 2001 census. The village is part of the Daventry constituency.

== History ==
The village's name means 'Counsellor's outlying farm/settlement'. Alternatively, the primary element could also be a personal name, 'Hreitharr', 'Reithar' or 'Redhar'.

The Berry ringworks are medieval fortifications built and occupied from the late Anglo-Saxon period to the later 12th century. They are situated between the junction of North Street and Church Street and were small defended areas of buildings surrounded partly or completely by large ditches and earthworks topped by wooden palisades. They are rare nationally.

The Berry is the site of a ringwork which stood at the centre of medieval Rothersthorpe. The site is irregularly shaped with a wide ditch on the north and west sides. There are the remains of an inner rampart in the north east corner and southern end. Features in the west of the interior of the works show the locations of former buildings. Remains of ridge and furrow farming are on the eastern side.

== Murder ==
The remains of Andrzej Kulesza, 27, were found in a field in the village in April 2011 by a woman walking her dog and confirmed as his in July 2011. A £20,000 reward was offered for information about his kidnap and murder. He disappeared from his home in Stamford Hill in September 2010 after going out to shop. His girlfriend received ransom calls and paid some money, but the calls stopped days after he went missing. Two men were arrested on suspicion of kidnap and murder and bailed to return later. On 7 August 2013 Kamil Dreszer was convicted of Kulesza's murder and sentenced to life imprisonment with a minimum term of 22 years. Artur Janik was found guilty of manslaughter, kidnapping, false imprisonment and preventing the lawful burial and disposal of a corpse. He was jailed for 11 years. Daniel Kosowski was found guilty of preventing the lawful burial and disposal of a corpse and jailed for 30 months.

== Demographics ==
The 2001 Census shows 500 people living in the parish, 237 male and 263 female, in 191 dwellings.

== Facilities ==
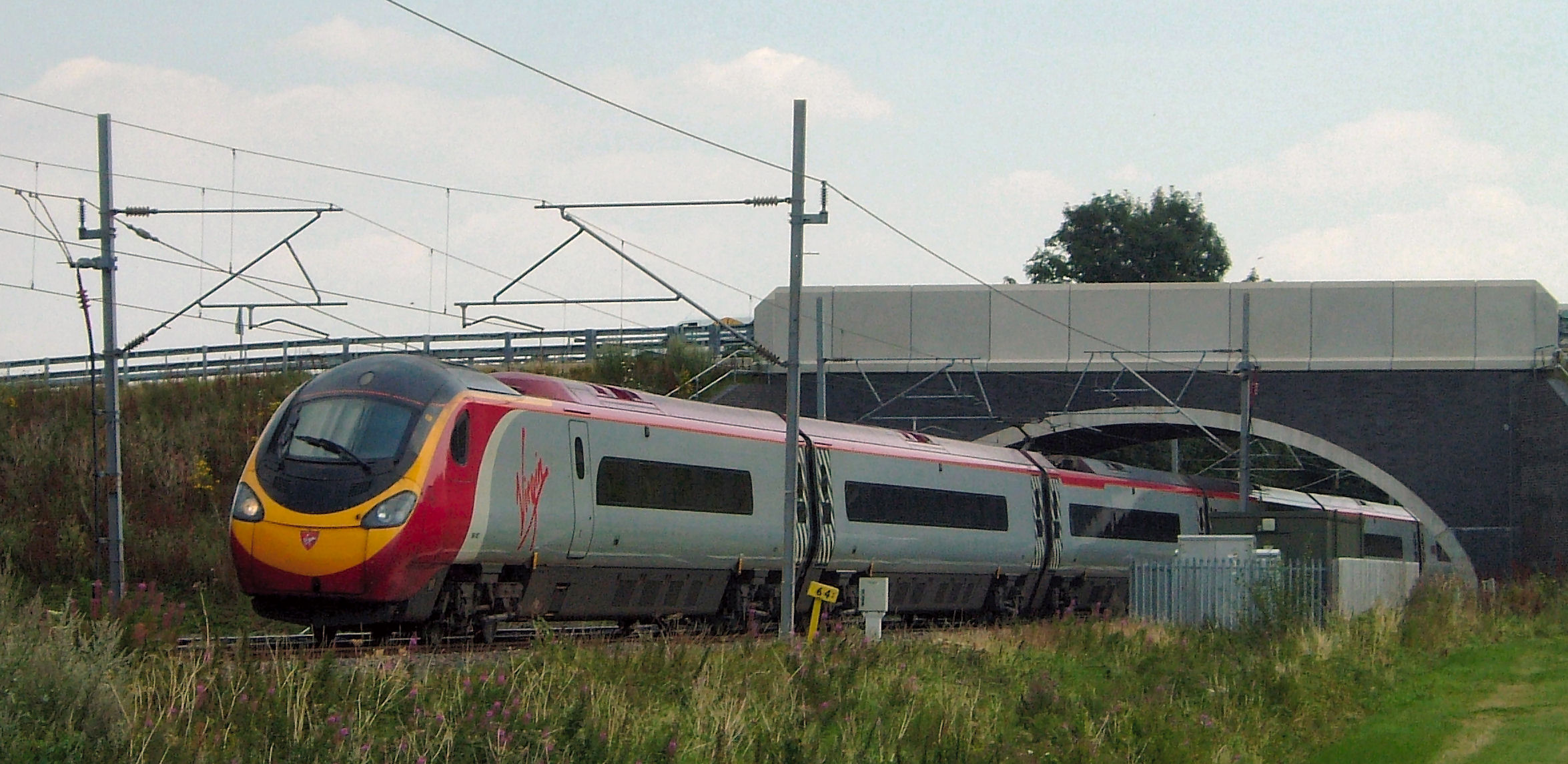
Banbury Lane road bridge crossing the West Coast Main Line south of the village

The village has a mixed Church of England primary school, and the church of SS Peter and Paul. A pub, The Chequers, closed in 2011.

The M1 motorway with the Northampton (formerly known as Rothersthorpe) Service Area and junction 15A is nearby but mostly out of hearing as the prevailing wind is south-westerly. There is, however, light pollution from the service area and a large area of warehouses in the nearby area of Northampton.

The Northampton Arm of the Grand Union Canal, built in 1815 passes near to Rothersthorpe. Seventeen locks, taking the canal into Northampton and its junction with the River Nene, takes about two hours for a boat to travel through.

The village is bisected by the Banbury Lane, an ancient drovers' road along which cattle were once taken to market in Banbury from as far afield as Scotland. Along this road a mile or so south was a level crossing with the West Coast Main Line railway route from London Euston to Glasgow, Scotland. The crossing was one of few left on the line and the first outside Euston, some 65 miles south. The level crossing and an adjacent bridge over the Grand Union Canal were replaced by a curved bridge in 2005. This was for safety reasons following projected speed increases to 125 miles per hour on the line operated by tilting Class 390 Pendolino trains.
