= 2015 South Northamptonshire District Council election =

2015 UK local government election

- 7 May 2015

All 42 seats in the South Northamptonshire District Council 22 seats needed for a majority
	First party	Second party	Third party
Party	Conservative	Liberal Democrats	Independent
Last election	33	2	6
Seats won	35	4	3
Seat change	▲2	▲2	▼3
Popular vote	14,049	5,250	2,864
Percentage	54.8%	20.5%	11.1%
- Results of the 2015 South Northamptonshire District Council election
Council control before election
Conservative
Council control after election
Conservative

The 2015 South Northamptonshire District Council election took place on 7 May 2015 to elect members of South Northamptonshire District Council in England. This was on the same day as other local elections.

== Election results ==
South Northamptonshire Council Election Result 2015
Party	Seats	Gains	Losses	Net gain/loss	Seats %	Votes %	Votes	+/−
Conservative	35	2	0	+2	83.0	54.8	14,049	
Liberal Democrats	4	2	0	+2	10.0	20.5	5,250	
Independent	3	0	3	-3	7.0	11.1	2,864	
UKIP	0	0	0	0	0.0	9.2	2,349	
Labour	0	0	1	-1	0.0	7.5	1,912	
Left Unity	0	0	0	0	0.0	0.8	217	

== Ward results ==
Astwell (1)
Party	Candidate	Votes	%	±%
Conservative	Simon Marinker	937		
Labour	David Toman	268		
Turnout		1,205	78.29	
Conservative hold		Swing		

Blakesley and Cote (2)
Party	Candidate	Votes	%	±%
Conservative	Roger Clarke	1,563		
Conservative	Sandi Smallman	1,391		
Labour	Maureen Morris	493		
Turnout			91.01	
Conservative hold		Swing		

Blisworth and Roade (2)
Party	Candidate	Votes	%	±%
Conservative	Stephen Clarke	1,313		
Conservative	Hywel Davies	1,197		
UKIP	Ray Dawkins	696		
Independent	Ron Johnson	523		
Left Unity	Stephen Anthony Miller	217		
Turnout			68.56	
Conservative hold		Swing		

Brackley East (2)
Party	Candidate	Votes	%	±%
Conservative	Tony Bagot-Webb	1,023		
Conservative	Peter Rawlinson	947		
Independent	Wilfrid Blake Stimpson	829		
UKIP	Tony Quinn	608		
Turnout			84.66	
Conservative gain from Independent		Swing		
Conservative hold		Swing		

Brackley South (2)
Party	Candidate	Votes	%	±%
Independent	Caryl Suzanne Billingham	791		
Conservative	Alice Ord	627		
Conservative	Paul Wiltshire	555		
Independent	Richard John Buter	504		
UKIP	John Frederick Baldry	395		
Labour	Douglas Barry	371		
Turnout			70.27	
Independent hold		Swing		
Conservative gain from Independent		Swing		

Brackley West (2)
Party	Candidate	Votes	%	±%
Conservative	Fiona Baker	1,174	46.7%	
Conservative	Elaine Wiltshire	821		
Independent	Chris Cartmell	679	27.0	
UKIP	Jim Broomfield	660	26.3	
Independent	Michael Genner	374		
Conservative gain from Independent		Swing		
Conservative hold		Swing		

Brafield and Yardley (2)
Party	Candidate	Votes	%	±%
Conservative	Carole Clarke	Unopposed		
Independent	Steven Hollowell	Unopposed		
Conservative hold		Swing		
Independent hold		Swing		

Cosgrove and Grafton (1)
Party	Candidate	Votes	%	±%
Conservative	Ian McCord	858	73.0	
Labour	Rosemary Hill	317	27.0	
Conservative hold		Swing		

Danvers and Wardoun (2)
Party	Candidate	Votes	%	±%
Conservative	Rosie Herring	Unopposed		
Conservative	Mary-Anne Sergison-Brooke	Unopposed		
Conservative hold		Swing		
Conservative hold		Swing		

Deanshanger (2)
Party	Candidate	Votes	%	±%
Conservative	Dennis Loveland	1,287	60.0	
Conservative	Allen Walker	1,261		
Labour	David Aaronson	859	40.0	
Conservative hold		Swing		
Conservative gain from Labour		Swing		

Grange Park (2)
Party	Candidate	Votes	%	±%
Conservative	Simon Clifford	1,459	71.4	
Conservative	Adil Sadygov	1,032		
Labour	Ian Grant	584	28.6	
Conservative hold		Swing		
Conservative hold		Swing		

Hackleton (1)
Party	Candidate	Votes	%	±%
Conservative	Bob Atkinson	Unopposed		
Conservative hold		Swing		

Harpole and Grange (2)
Party	Candidate	Votes	%	±%
Conservative	Ann Addison	1,856	66.5	
Conservative	Karen Cooper	1,459		
Green	Andy Clarke	933	33.5	
Conservative hold		Swing		
Conservative hold		Swing		

Heyfords and Bugbrooke (2)
Party	Candidate	Votes	%	±%
Conservative	Phil Bignell	Unopposed		
Independent	David Harries	Unopposed		
Conservative hold		Swing		
Independent hold		Swing		

Kings Sutton (1)
Party	Candidate	Votes	%	±%
Conservative	Simon Clifford	750	62.8	
Labour	Ian Grant	445	37.2	
Conservative hold		Swing		

Kingthorn (1)
Party	Candidate	Votes	%	±%
Conservative	Charles Manners	Unopposed		
Conservative hold		Swing		

Little Brook (1)
Party	Candidate	Votes	%	±%
Conservative	John Townsend	Unopposed		
Conservative hold		Swing		

Middleton Cheney (2)
Party	Candidate	Votes	%	±%
Conservative	Val Furniss	1,527	63.8	
Conservative	Judith Baxter	1,151		
Independent	John Kilmister	868	36.2	
Conservative hold		Swing		
Conservative hold		Swing		

Old Stratford (1)
Party	Candidate	Votes	%	±%
Conservative	Stephen Mold	Unopposed		
Conservative hold		Swing		

Salcey (1)
Party	Candidate	Votes	%	±%
Conservative	John Budden	Unopposed		
Conservative hold		Swing		

Silverstone (1)
Party	Candidate	Votes	%	±%
Conservative	Dermot Bambridge	1,083	81.9	
Labour	Michael Caseman-Jones	239	18.1	
Conservative hold		Swing		

Steane (1)
Party	Candidate	Votes	%	±%
Conservative	Rebecca Breese	Unopposed		
Conservative hold		Swing		

Tove (1)
Party	Candidate	Votes	%	±%
Conservative	Sandra Barnes	828	76.5	
UKIP	Roger French	254	23.5	
Conservative hold		Swing		

Towcester Brook (3)
Party	Candidate	Votes	%	±%
Liberal Democrats	Martin Johns	1,266	44.9	+1.0
Liberal Democrats	Lisa Samiotis	1,240		
Conservative	Richard Dallyn	1,080	39.5	−3.0
Conservative	John Gasking	1050		
Liberal Democrats	David Tarbun	895		
Conservative	Richard Woods	866		
UKIP	Peter Jeffrey Conquest	650	8.6	−5.0
Labour	Andrea Storey	529	6.9	N/A
Turnout			78.55	
Liberal Democrats hold		Swing		
Liberal Democrats hold		Swing		
Conservative hold		Swing		

Towcester Mill (2)
Party	Candidate	Votes	%	±%
Liberal Democrats	Chris Lofts	995	51.4	+24.6
Liberal Democrats	Catharine Tarbun	854		
Conservative	Andrew Grant	773	41.7	−14.3
Conservative	Andrew Wilby	727		
Labour	Gail Susan Caseman-Jones	251	6.9	−10.2
Turnout			85.06	
Liberal Democrats gain from Conservative		Swing		
Liberal Democrats gain from Conservative		Swing		

Washington (1)
Party	Candidate	Votes	%	±%
Conservative	Peter Davies	Unopposed		
Conservative hold		Swing		

Whittlewood (1)
Party	Candidate	Votes	%	±%
Conservative	Lizzy Bowen	Unopposed		
Conservative hold		Swing		
