= Milton Malsor =

Village in Northamptonshire, England

Coordinates: 52.194°N 0.927°W

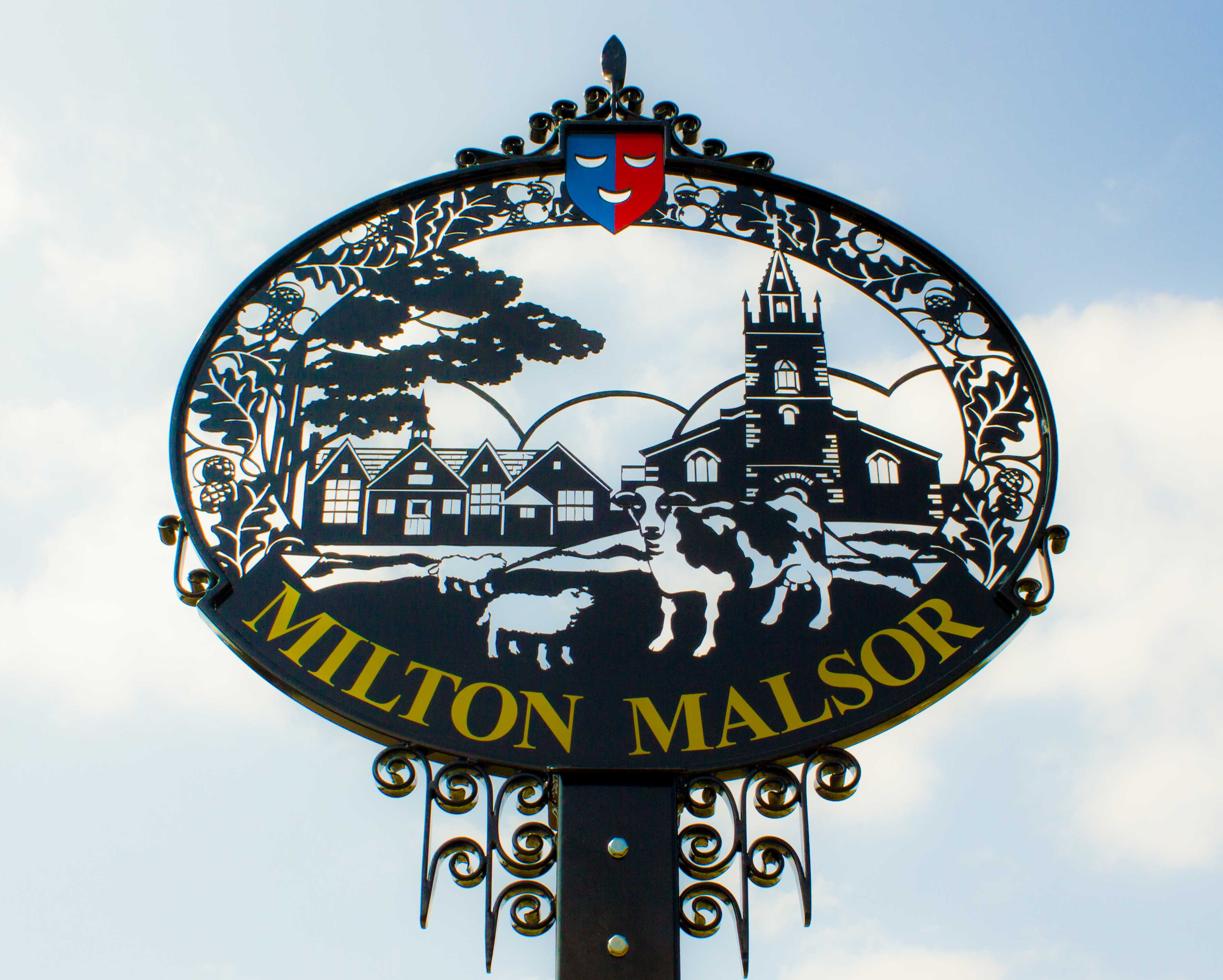
- Village sign erected 30 July 2014

- Location within Northamptonshire
- Population: 761 (2011 census); 713 (2001 census)
- OS grid reference: SP734556
  - London: 66 miles (106 km)
- Civil parish: Milton Malsor
- Unitary authority: West Northamptonshire
- Ceremonial county: Northamptonshire
- Region: East Midlands
- Country: England
- Sovereign state: United Kingdom
- Post town: NORTHAMPTON
- Postcode district: NN7
- Dialling code: 01604
- Police: Northamptonshire
- Fire: Northamptonshire
- Ambulance: East Midlands
- UK Parliament: From 2010: Daventry

Milton Malsor is a village and civil parish in West Northamptonshire, England. The population of the civil parish at the 2011 census was 761. It is 4 miles (6.4 km) south of Northampton town centre, 45 miles (72 km) south-east of Birmingham, and 66 miles (106 km) north of central London; junction 15 of the M1 motorway is 2 miles (3.2 km) east by road. The area of the Milton Malsor civil parish is about 1,650 acres (670 ha), stretching from north of the M1 motorway between junctions 15 and 15A, south to the West Coast Main Line, east to the A508 and A45 roads, and west to the A43 road.

== History ==
The Malsoures or Malesoures family arms: party azure and gules three crescents argent

The village's name is from the Old English middel for "Middle" and tun meaning farm or settlement and the second part of the name appears to be from "Malsoures", the name of a prominent local family added much later. The first recorded mention of the village is in the days of William the Conqueror and the Domesday Book of 1086. This records that there were two manors and two men held lands at Milton as part of their Baronies. These were William Peverel and Goisfrid Alselin.

== Governance ==
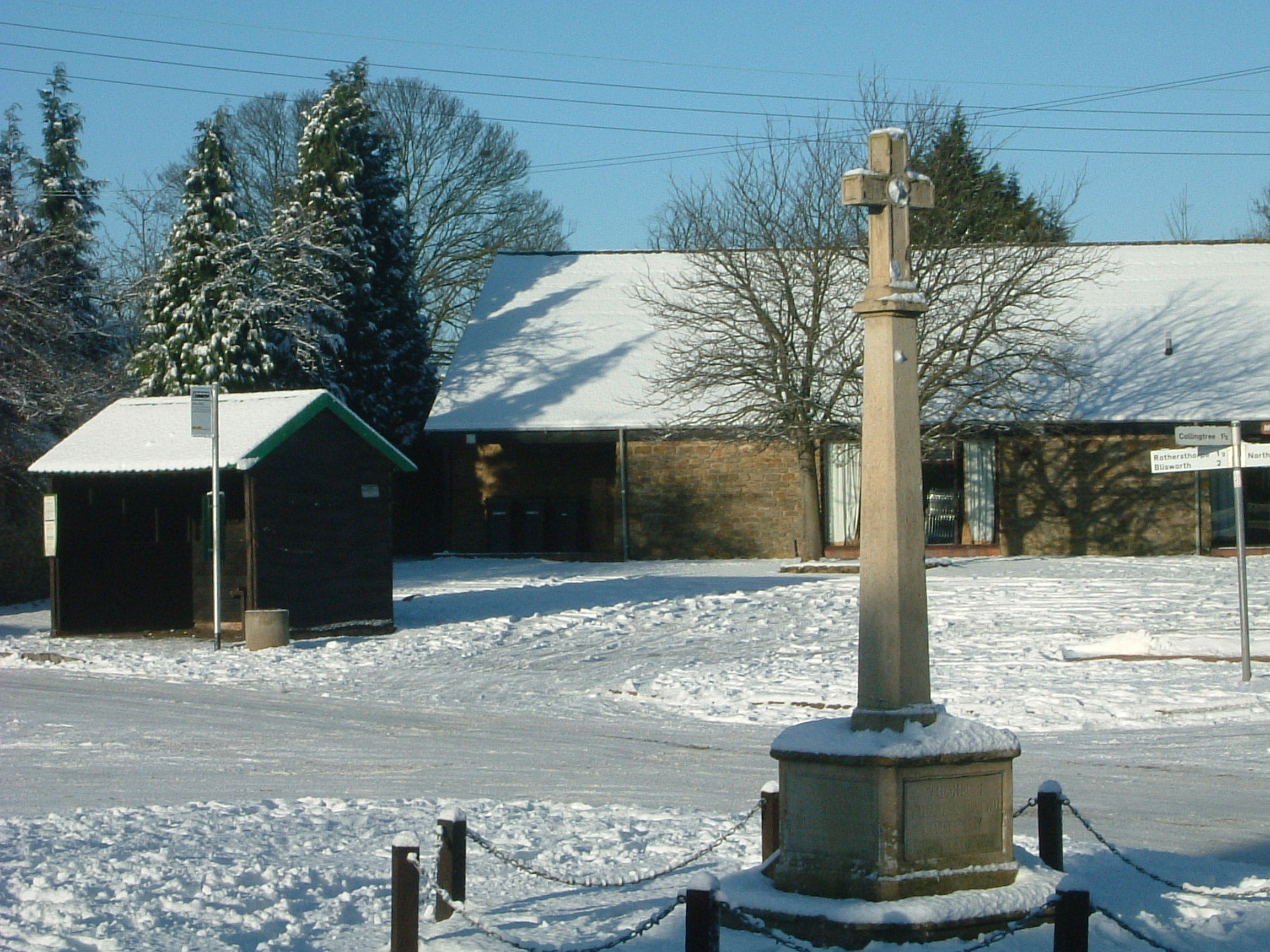
War Memorial and Village Hall (behind) in snow on 29 January 2004

The village has a Parish Council with nine members elected every four years (last election 2015). The parish council area extends to include the M1 in the north between junctions 15 and 15a; to the east the A508 Northampton to Milton Keynes main road and A45 towards Huntingdon and Peterborough; to the south part of the West Coast Main Line and to the west the A43 Northampton-Oxford trunk road. The local council is currently West Northamptonshire. Before the merger in 2021 the local district council was South Northamptonshire where Milton was in Harpole and Grange ward together with the villages of Gayton, Rothersthorpe, Harpole and Kislingbury which elected two members. The parish was in the Northamptonshire County Council division of Bugbrooke (from May 2013) with just over 10,000 electors and had one member, the last one being from the Conservative.

The Member of Parliament from 2010 is Chris Heaton-Harris, Conservative, for the Daventry Parliamentary Constituency. Prior to the 2010 General Election the village was in Northampton South Parliamentary Constituency. Initially the Boundary Commission wanted to move the village into the new parliamentary constituency of South Northamptonshire. However, as this was inconvenient for election administration purposes, the Boundary Commission put Milton with fellow ward villages in South Northants Council's "Harpole and Grange" ward into the Daventry Constituency previously held Tim Boswell who stood down at 2010 General Election.

== Geography ==
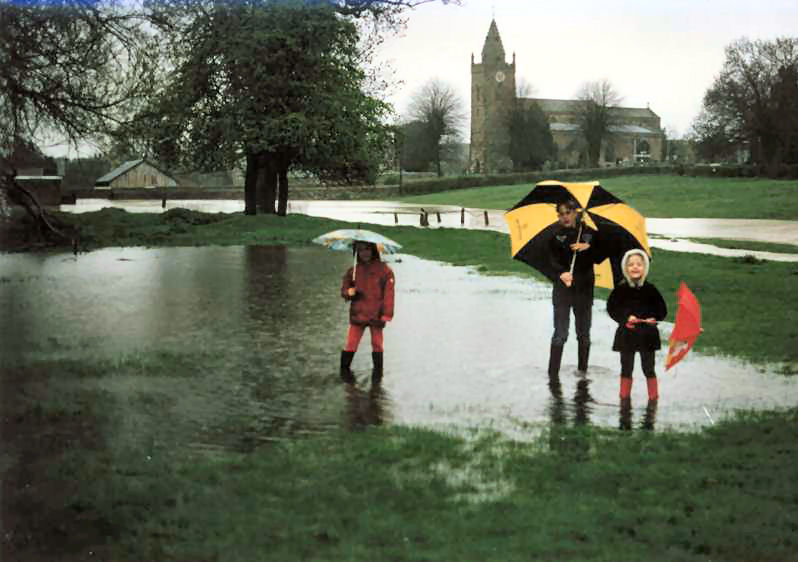
Flooding in 'The Dip' in 1998

Many fields around the village reflect England's history. The field known as 'the Leys' (opposite Milton House in Rectory Lane) shows clear signs of 18th-century pre-enclosure and pre-British Agricultural Revolution farming in strips although this is slowly disappearing with recent farming. The mediaeval open field system was enclosed in Milton in 1779 together with that of Collingtree. The soil is predominantly sandy as one might expect since the area is the bed of an ancient river. Evidence of sand and clay extraction is all around, reflecting 19th- and 20th-century industrial and urban expansion. For example, the small industrial estate in Gayton Road is on an old clay quarry; the playing and football fields in Collingtree Road are on the sites of sand quarries - in the latter case mostly filled with clay spoil from the 1950s construction of the M1. The field between Towcester Road and the A43 Milton by-pass, which opened in May 1991, to the west of the village was also the site of a sand quarry in the 1950s and 1960s.

In 1965 the driver of a mechanical digger spotted a shiny object in a newly exposed face. It turned out to be an early Bronze Age Cinerary Urn. The field between the village and the M1 on the north side of Collingtree Road is an area designated by Northamptonshire County Council for sand extraction. The sand is stated by the county council to be of the 'soft sand' type suitable for mortar. The site is in Milton Malsor parish and only ca.200m from houses in the village. It was originally called the "Collingtree site" but the county council finally referred to it as the Milton site in late 2008. It has so far not been developed probably due to its triangular shape and stranded location between the motorway along one edge, the railway line another and a road unsuited to heavy lorries on the third. The site is included in the county council's mineral's and waste plan, the subject of a Public Inquiry in 2009. A third Public Inquiry in 2010 retained the site.

A stream runs northwest through the village, partly in a conduit but visible from Collingtree Road and Rectory Lane as it flows north through the field known as 'The Dip' after an old sheep dip the remains of which are still visible. In Spring 1998 this flooded, causing minor damage to some houses. The stream flows north joining with others from the east and south flowing south and west around Hunsbury Hill. It then joins the River Nene at Upton, west of Northampton. The Grand Union Canal and its Northampton arm, built in 1815 passes nearby. There is a marina just off the road to Gayton. There are 17 locks on the arm, taking the canal downhill into Northampton and to join the River Nene east of the town. It takes about two hours for a boat to travel through.

== Demography ==
The 2011 United Kingdom census showed there were 761 (2001: 713) people living in the village, 359 male (2001: 344), 402 female (2001: 369), with average age 41.1 years (2001: 45.21). There were 311 dwellings (2001: 302). The surrounding South Northamptonshire district is rural and sparsely populated with just over 80,000 people in 2000.

New development within the village boundary is restricted to infill development only. A new housing development of 14 houses was completed in Chestnut Close in 2008. A smaller ones of 6 dwellings was begun in 2010 for the derelict Home Farm site off Malzor Lane and one or two others elsewhere. In 2010 a proposal for 25 houses for a site off Stockwell Way was opposed by the parish council and refused by the district council as it was outside the village boundary and contrary to district council adopted policy. Planning details can be accessed via the parish council website. Possible urban extensions to Northampton were proposed in 2007 by the West Northamptonshire Joint Planning Unit, a group formed by Northampton Borough Council, South Northamptonshire District Council and Daventry District Council. These proposals included extensions on land in the parish between the M1 motorway, north of the village, A43 by-pass (west), A508 trunk road (east) and the West Coast main railway line to the south. A parkway station south the village was also mentioned but train operators do not want further stops on the line between London and Rugby via Northampton. Possible expansion of Northampton south of the M1 affecting the village were excluded from draft proposals published for consultation in July 2009.

== Economy ==
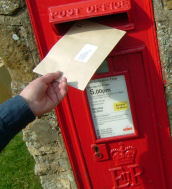
Milton postbox with the insignia of Queen Elizabeth II

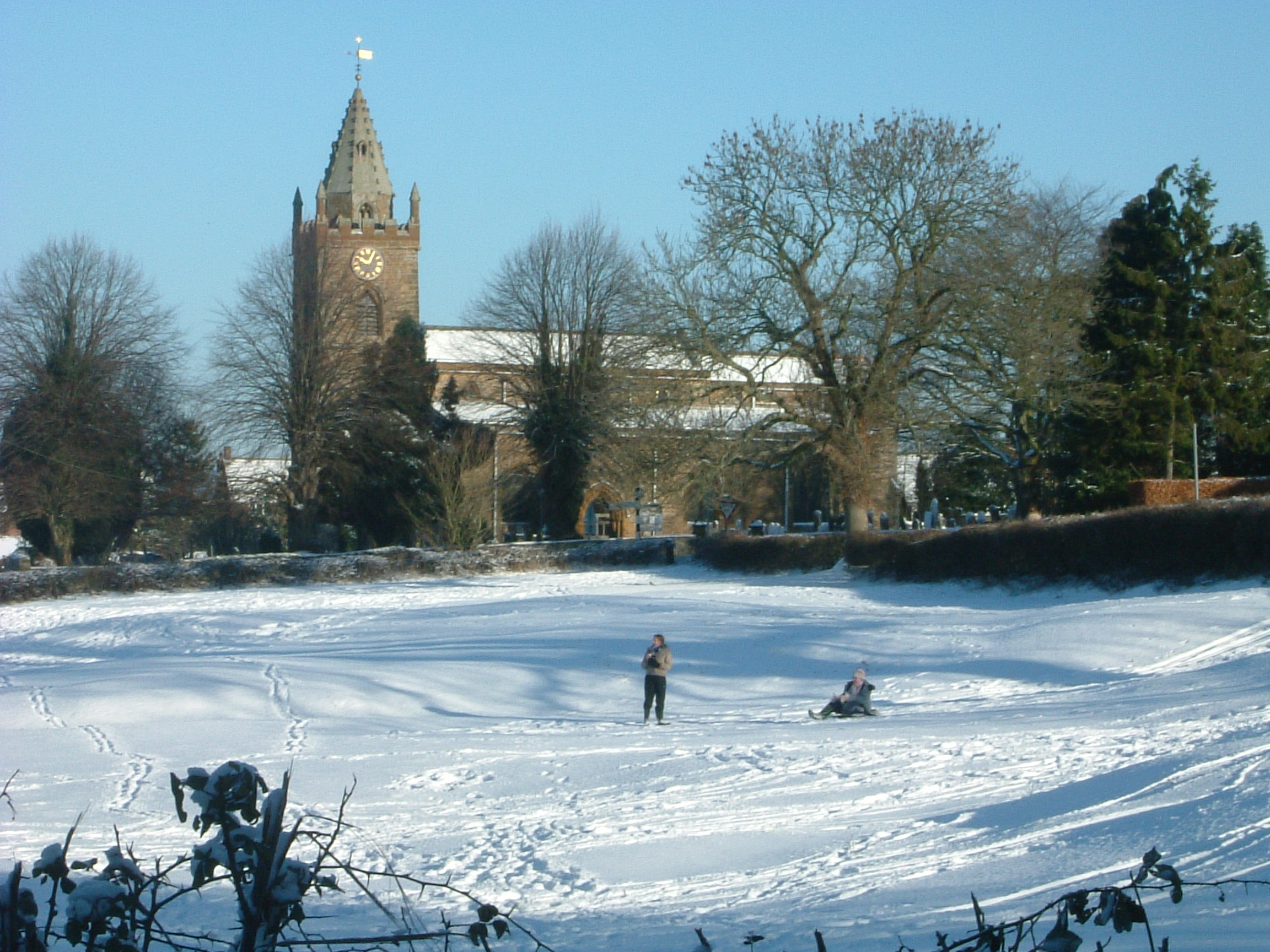
Village Church of the Holy Cross in 2004

There are two pubs: "The Greyhound" in Towcester Road, which has a large restaurant, and "The Compass" in Green Street. The Compass has been permanently closed since 2020.

Milton Malsor has a retirement care home for the elderly in Green Street called Holly House. Sheltered housing for older people in the form of 26 flats and bungalows is also provided in the village by South Northants Homes Ltd.

A shop and former post office and the modern village hall, refurbished in 2008, are both in the High Street opposite the green and War Memorial. The Northampton Hilton Hotel is approximately 1½ miles distant on Watering Lane in the neighbouring village of Collingtree, just off the A45 trunk road. There are several other hotels in the area along the A45 trunk road.

The village has two small industrial estates; the larger on Gayton Road is adjacent, but with no access, to the A43. This is referred to locally as 'Gallifords' reflecting its ownership. The smaller is adjacent to the M1 bridge along Collingtree Road and known as 'Maple Court' alluding to its history. There is an architect's office in the old Rectory and additional modern offices on Towcester Road in the converted Hope Brewery and out buildings.

A mobile library visits the village every two weeks; the nearest local library is at Hunsbury, about a mile north, next to a large Tesco 'Extra' supermarket and petrol station.

There are three working farms in the parish including a free-range egg farm.

== Landmarks ==
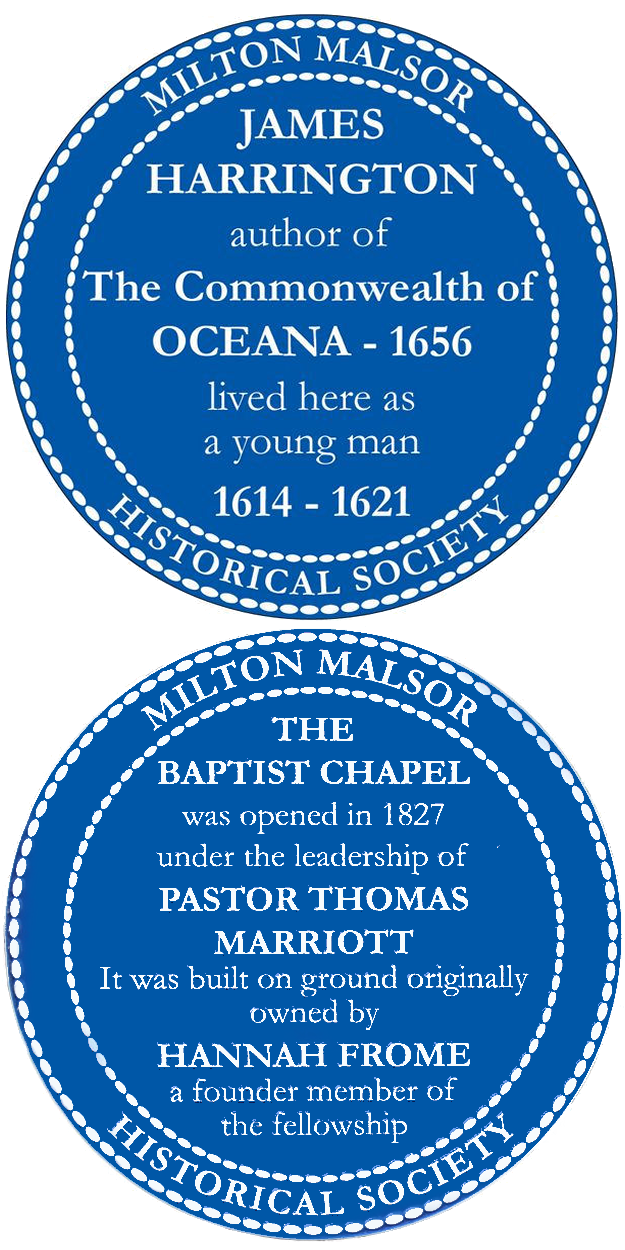
Plaques at the Manor House in Rectory Lane where James Harrington, author of Oceana lived and the Baptist Chapel in Green Street founded 1827.

Much of the village is in a conservation area which is shown on a map on the Parish Council website and has many traditional Northamptonshire stone cottages, a large number of which have thatched or pantiled roofs. There are over 30 listed buildings in the village, most in the conservation area. Particular buildings of note, mostly listed by their street locations, are as follows:

- Rectory Lane, formerly Pluck's Lane
  - Milton House (early 18th century) and Manor Cottage (1777) attached on the east side, Grade II listed. The house has a doorway with Tuscan columns^{[a]}
  - Mortimers,^{[a]} Grade II listed, early 18th century earlier than Milton House, which was named after a family who lived there and originally owned by the Hospital of St John at the bottom of Bridge Street in Northampton. The house and its grounds were auctioned on 17 March 2011 fetching a total of £1,115,000, but with the house requiring substantial refurbishment. According to the local paper the house was once lived-in by Revd Samuel Wathen Wigg, a local clergyman and curate of St. James Church in Northampton the founder of Northampton Saints Rugby Football Club. Prior to the 2011 sale, the house was previously sold in 1921, and was lived in by the Alexander family, then by Margaret Alexander, granddaughter of Wigg.
  - Milton Malsor Manor, Grade II listed, 16th century, James Harrington, the author of the controversial book "The Commonwealth of Oceana", published 1656, was a former occupant and the building has a blue plaque in recognition, installed on 4 October 2008.
  - Dovecote and Stable with coach house doors, Milton Malsor Manor, grade two listed. 18th-century with older origins and 20th-century alterations.
  - The Old Rectory^{[b]}, now used as architects offices. Grade two listed, 18th-century with older origins.
- Collingtree Road
  - Church of the Holy Cross, Church of England, 12th-century origins but most late 13th- to mid-14th-century. The church has a crenellated tower, and later battlements and pinnacles. There are monuments to Mrs Sapcotes Harington, d. 1619, and Richard Dodwell, d. 1726
  - The Grange^{[c]}
- Green Street
  - Baptist Chapel, 1827, founded by Thomas Marriott (b. Denton 1789 d. Milton 14 June 1876) and buried in the churchyard of the chapel.
  - The Manse^{[c]} (next to the chapel), residence of Marriott as Pastor
  - Milton Parochial Primary School
  - Welstead Farm House^{[c]}
  - The Old Bakehouse^{[c]}
  - The Compass Public House
- Malzor Lane
  - Milton Manor House^{[c]} not to be confused with The Manor in Rectory Lane. Nick Raynsford, Labour Party MP for Greenwich was brought up here. The house has a notable 17th-century staircase with acanthus scrolls similar to work at Lamport Hall and Castle Ashby
- High Street
  - Old Primitive Methodist Chapel, 1865, now used as a private residence
  - War Memorial, ca.1920 on the Village green
  - Milton Grove, now Grove House,^{[c]} former residence of Thomas Marriott
  - Stockwell Farm House, ca.1653^{[c]}
  - Village Pound marked with a plaque stating in existence since at least 1686
- Towcester Road
  - The Greyhound Public House and Restaurant
  - The former Hope Brewery, now converted to offices. In 1892 Phipps Northampton Brewery Company acquired the business from East Brothers. In 1906 NBC it was closed moving production to Northampton, Bridge Street, now the site of the Carlsberg brewery
  - The Counties Crematorium, erroneously referred to as being in Milton, is now actually outside the parish about a mile north of the village and north of the M1 in West Hunsbury, Northampton with the Northampton borough postcode NN4 9RN

Notes
^{a} There are good views from the public footpath across the field known as "The Leys" in Rectory Lane.
^{b} Private property - view of rear garden shown with permission
^{c} Private property - not open to the public
Public footpaths in the village are clearly marked by green fingerposts. Dog fouling throughout the parish, including footpaths, is strictly prohibited with heavy fines for infringement.

== Transport ==
The county of Northants is at a north-south and east-west rail, motorway and fast road transport network. The Northampton Loop of the West Coast Main Line carries trains from Northampton to London Euston and runs through the parish just east of the village, with the main line about a mile south. The nearest convenient stations are at Northampton (4 miles north), Milton Keynes Central (14 miles south) and also Wellingborough (12 miles east) on the Midland Main Line with links to Sheffield, Leicester and London St Pancras.

Typical travel times in minutes by road (peak times in italics) are: central London 75 (110), Birmingham 45 (60), Manchester 120 (175), Leicester 50 (65), Oxford 50 (60), Cambridge 85 (130), Milton Keynes 20 (30). Travel times (peak) by rail (from April 2008) by West Midlands Trains - as well as Avanti West Coast services in minutes are: from Northampton to Central London (Euston) 55, to Birmingham 65; from Milton Keynes to Central London 40 and Manchester 120. Airports at Heathrow, Gatwick, and Stansted as well as Birmingham Airport, Luton and East Midlands are all within easy reach. The village has bus services to Northampton, Towcester and Milton Keynes, though this is poor on Sundays and weekday evenings.

=== 1967 and 1969 railway accidents ===
On 18 April 1967 at about 2.31pm, a wagon on a goods train of 69 empty mineral wagons, travelling on the down line to Northampton, derailed just south of the village. The train travelled a further 1½ miles before more wagons derailed, a little distance north of the village playing field. Some of the wagons went towards the up line from Northampton to London and were hit by a four-coach passenger train at about 70 mph. Although the brakes of the passenger train had been fully applied, two coaches were derailed with one falling onto its side. All 45 passengers and train crew were evacuated fairly promptly. Of these, 21 were injured but only two were detained at Northampton General Hospital. The driver of the passenger train was seriously injured but both he and the passenger detained overnight made a good recovery.

The inspector's report on the incident states that "...assistance was given by the residents of the nearby village of Milton Malsor and I am informed that members of the Women's Institute of this village were quick to organise refreshment for those involved in the accident and their rescuers". The Inspector concluded that the accident resulted from a broken spring on the goods train.

A similar accident occurred on 31 December 1969 but about a mile further south near the northern end of Roade Cutting; on this occasion, the driver of the passenger train involved was killed.

== Education ==
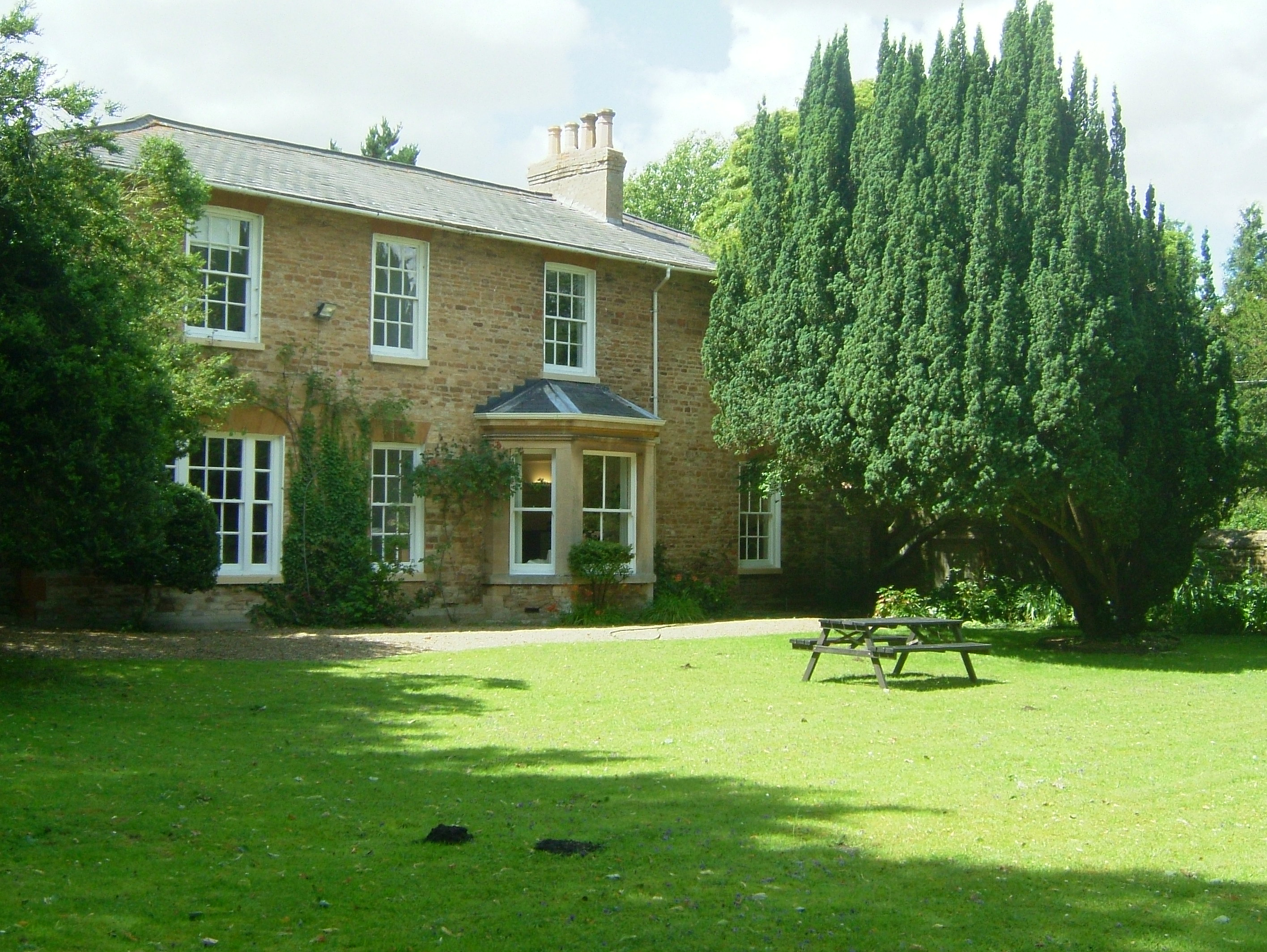
The Old Rectory from the rear garden with permission 18 July 2007

Milton Parochial Primary School in Green Street had 110 pupils in 2007, a large proportion of which were from the southern area of Northampton such as Hunsbury. The most recent Ofsted inspection, published 4 November 2010 stated: This is a good school. The pupils make good progress and achieve well because the teaching is effective. Crazy 4 Kids After School and Holiday Club is privately owned located in the grounds of the Primary School. Children have access to the school hall, adjoining quiet room and a secure outdoor play area. The club is open each weekday from 3:30 pm to 6 pm and from 8 am to 6 pm during the school holidays. The most recent Ofsted report on the club states that: Overall the quality of the provision is good. The village is in the catchment area of Campion Secondary School at Bugbrooke, about 6 miles (10 km) away by road with the children bussed daily.

== Religion ==
There is a church, dedicated to the Holy Cross in Collingtree Road which has its own parochial church council and is part of the Church of England's Peterborough Diocese. Prior to 2009, the church was part of the "Three Parishes Group" together with the churches of the nearby villages of Collingtree and Courteenhall. Since 2010 it has been re-grouped with four other parishes including Blisworth and Stoke Bruerne. There is also a Baptist Chapel in Green Street. A joint church newsletter is delivered roughly monthly.

== Culture and community ==
The village has an active number of social and other groups including a Women's Institute which meets monthly; a village football club, Milton FC with its own village team and a reserve team which takes an active part in the Travis Perkins Northamptonshire Combination; indoor bowls and badminton groups both meet regularly in the village hall; village historical society with regular meetings about local matters of esoteric and general interest; an art club meets at the village hall during school term time. The village has a Scouts group, 1st Collingtree and Milton Malsor Scouts, and Brownies group which meet at the village hall during school term time.
