= Harpole =

Village in Northamptonshire, England

Coordinates: 52.241603°N 0.990786°W

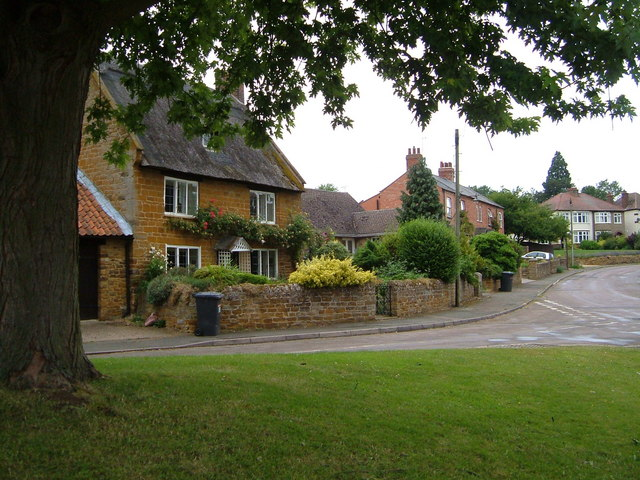

- Location within Northamptonshire
- Population: 1,545 (2001 census); 1,546 (2011 census)
- OS grid reference: SP691608
  - London: 69 mi (111 km)
- Civil parish: Harpole
- Unitary authority: West Northamptonshire
- Ceremonial county: Northamptonshire
- Region: East Midlands
- Country: England
- Sovereign state: United Kingdom
- Post town: NORTHAMPTON
- Postcode district: NN7
- Dialling code: 01604
- Police: Northamptonshire
- Fire: Northamptonshire
- Ambulance: East Midlands
- UK Parliament: South Northamptonshire

Harpole is a village and civil parish in Northamptonshire, England. The village lies to the North of the A4500 road (formerly the A45), 4 miles (6.4 km) west of Northampton and 1 mile (1.6 km) northeast of junction 16 of the M1 motorway. At the 2011 Census, the civil parish had a population of 1,546.

== Governance ==
Harpole lies in the unitary authority of West Northamptonshire and in the parliamentary constituency of South Northamptonshire. The local MP is Sarah Bool.

It was formerly in the area of Northamptonshire County Council and was in the Parliamentary Constituency of Daventry until 2024.

From 1974 to 2021, Harpole was in the South Northamptonshire local government district, where it was part of Harpole and Grange ward, together with the parishes of Milton Malsor, Kislingbury, Rothersthorpe and Gayton.

== Geography and Topography ==
The parish of Harpole covers about 760 hectares to the North of the River Nene which forms its southern boundary. The solid geology of the area is predominately Glacial Boulder Clay.

The historic core of Harpole retains the linear arrangement of its past, derived in part from the settlements manorial and agricultural origins.

The parish boundary is defined by streams emerging from springs in the high ground to the North of the village. The village itself is on the edge of the Northamptonshire Vales national character area built on relatively flat ground sloping gently down towards the Nene to the South. It is encircled by higher ground of the Northamptonshire Uplands national character area to the North and West.

The village lies between 70m and 90m above sea level. The elevation range of the parish ranges from approximately 65m along the Nene’s north bank to 140m atop the ridge to the Northwest of the village.

== History ==
Evidence indicates that Neolithic, Bronze and Iron Age settlement occurred within the parish. Roman settlement is more certain with the area around Harpole being forming part of a wider Roman landscape dominated by villa estates. The former Roman road from Bannaventa to Duston passes to the north of the settlement on the rough alignment of the current Duston, Nobottle, Brington Road. A Roman mosaic floor uncovered in 1846-48 identifies the site of a Roman villa north of the village. It has the scheduled monument reference number of 1003901.

Harpole is mentioned in the Domesday Book of 1086, with a recorded population of 27. The tenant in chief was William Peverel who held 2½ hides in Harpole. The total amount of arable land within the parish was 6 carucates. Other resources included 10 acres of meadow land and 10 acres of woodland. There was also a mill and Domesday recorded a priest which suggests that by the time the first Rector of Harpole was appointed in 1224 that there was probably a well-established church within the settlement.

The village grew round two separate medieval manors, the Tanfield Manor and the St Hillery Manor (later known as the Vaux Manor), the exact locations of which are not clear. This feature contributed to the linear shape of the historic village centre.

In the 17th century, after the feudal manorial lands had been broken up into parcels of land, and had been sold to local yeomen, Harpole experienced a burst of building activity typical of much of the country and referred to as ‘The Great Rebuilding.’ Many of the older buildings along the High Street date from around this time, typified by stone boundary walls and steep roofs.

The village was a thriving community in the 18th century and there are several listed buildings from this period. In around 1815, the Manning family built the Hall out of the profits made from the brewing industry and extensive farming in the surrounding area. The enclosure award in Harpole was made in 1778 and amongst other things made provision for the establishment of a school. It was however not until 1835 that a purpose made building was constructed.

Agriculture dominated until the mid-19th century. However, shoemaking had been one of Harpole’s staple trades. Local factors set up their agencies in the village, and many houses were extended to accommodate a shop where uppers were hand stitched before being taken to Northampton for finishing.

Many of the buildings from the 1850’s onwards are brick built, with Welsh slate roofs. In 1876 an early Cooperative movement was set up in Harpole. Ten years after it opened the Harpole Society had 193 members and purpose-built premises on the corner at the junction of Larkhall Lane and Upper High Street. It had a butchery with slaughter house attached, a bakery and general stores, a chemist and a millinery as well as a coal yard.

=== Etymology ===
Sources disagree on the etymology of the village's name. It may be derived from Old English horu ‘dirt’ + pōl ‘pool’ or may refer to a location characterized by a har (a term for a hare) and pole (a term for a hill or mound). An alternative etymology is suggested by the parish council: In the Domesday Book the village is named Horpol with ‘Hor’ being the Saxon word for bound or limit, and ‘Pol’ that for pool.

=== Public Houses ===
The White Swan was situated on Park Lane. The Bull was situated on High Street and permanently closed in December 2021, before being converted into a private dwelling.

=== Harpole Bed Burial ===
In April 2022 archaeologists found an early Christian Anglo-Saxon era burial site of a woman of high social standing at an area in Harpole being developed for housing by Vistry. The discovery was announced in December 2022 and described as "the most significant early medieval female burial ever discovered in Britain".

=== Flight LP826 ===
On 24th September 1944 a Vickers Wellington Bomber crashed into Glassthorpe Hill. All seven crew were killed instantly.

Flight LP826 of 85 OTU departed Husbands Bosworth at 19:35 for a Navigation Exercise over Cumbria. After an uneventful flight, the aircraft broke up in mid air and crashed into Glassthorpe Hill at approximately 23:30.

A memorial plaque on the south side of the War Memorial in the churchyard commemorates the crew:

- Sgt Alan Henry Wilton, 28 - Pilot
- Sgt Clifford John Rowlands, 20 - Navigator
- Sgt Joseph David Shykoff (RCAF), 19 - Navigator
- Sgt Frederick Charles Saunders, 19 - Wireless Operator
- Sgt Sidney Francis Coleman, 20 - Air Gunner
- Sgt Charles Harper, 20 - Air Gunner
- Sgt Thomas William Jones, 19 - Air Gunner

== Demographics ==
2001 census data shows 1,547 people resident in the Parish Council area consisting of 755 males and 792 females (the 2009 estimated population is 1,557), in 636 households, of which 82.6% were owner occupied or being purchased with a mortgage.

== Transport ==
Harpole lies to the North of the A4500 (formerly the A45 and historically the Turnpike road) and to the South of Roman Road connecting Duston with Whilton. Junction 16 of the M1 lies 1 mile to the Southwest of the village, where a logistics and industrial park dominates the southwest corner of the parish.

=== Bus Services ===
Harpole village is served by the D3 bus route connecting Northampton and Daventry and has a roughly 2 hourly service in each direction Monday to Friday (excluding public holidays), with a sparser service on Saturdays.

=== Rail Services ===
The nearest railway station is Northampton.

=== Walking ===
The Northamptonshire Round passes through Harpole. Travelling in a clockwise direction the route crosses farmland to the South and enters the village at the Southern end of Park Lane, before following High Street to School Lane. The route proceeds along School Lane to the public footpath adjacent to Old School Hall, then follows this footpath across fields to Harpole Covert before continuing to Nobottle.

== Education ==
Harpole has a primary school, pre-school and nursery

== Village events ==
Harpole hosts a scarecrow festival each September to raise funds for charitable organisations in the village. There is also an event in December where Santa drives around the village, as in, following him.
