= Bradden =

Village in Northamptonshire, England

Coordinates: 52.1300°N 1.0557°W

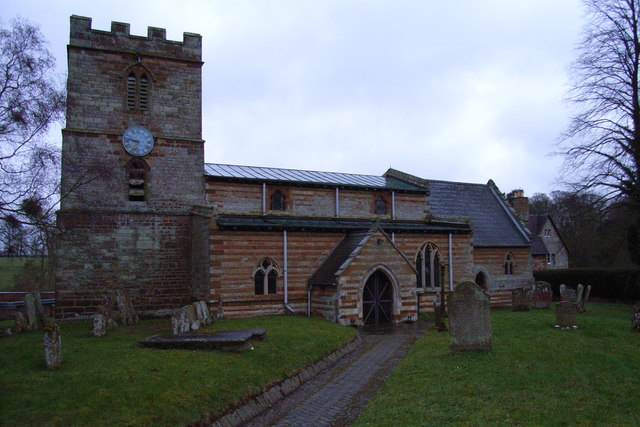
- St Michael's Church, Bradden

- Location within Northamptonshire
- Population: 150 (2021 Census)
- OS grid reference: SP647483
  - London: 69 miles (111 km)
- Unitary authority: West Northamptonshire
- Ceremonial county: Northamptonshire
- Region: East Midlands
- Country: England
- Sovereign state: United Kingdom
- Post town: Towcester
- Postcode district: NN12
- Dialling code: 01327
- Police: Northamptonshire
- Fire: Northamptonshire
- Ambulance: East Midlands
- UK Parliament: Daventry

Bradden is a village and civil parish in West Northamptonshire, England, about 4 miles (6.4 km) west of Towcester. According to the 2021 census, Bradden has a population of 150.

The village's name means 'Broad Valley'.

== Buildings ==
The Parish Church is dedicated to St Michael and is 13th century.

There is a Manor House dated 1819 but there was an earlier pre-Reformation house before and the front looks earlier than 1819.
