= Gayton, Northamptonshire =

Village in Northamptonshire, England

Coordinates: 52.185°N 0.974°W

Gayton
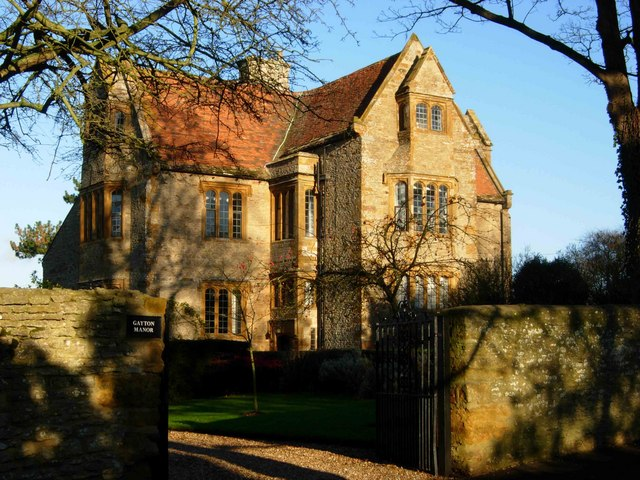
- Gayton Manor

- Location within Northamptonshire
- Population: 544 (2011)
- OS grid reference: SP704547
  - London: 69 miles (111 km) SE
- Civil parish: Gayton
- Unitary authority: West Northamptonshire
- Ceremonial county: Northamptonshire
- Region: East Midlands
- Country: England
- Sovereign state: United Kingdom
- Post town: NORTHAMPTON
- Postcode district: NN7
- Dialling code: 01604
- Police: Northamptonshire
- Fire: Northamptonshire
- Ambulance: East Midlands
- UK Parliament: Daventry

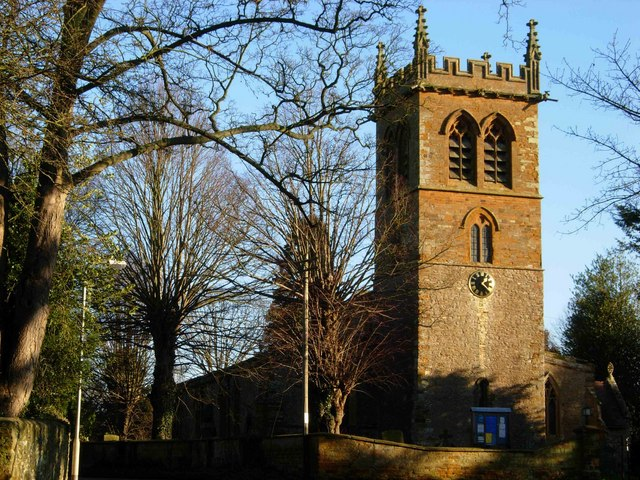
Gayton church of St Mary

Gayton is a rural village and civil parish in West Northamptonshire, England, 5 miles (8 km) south-west of Northampton town centre. The village is situated on a hill close to the larger villages of Bugbrooke, Milton Malsor and Blisworth, with a linked public footpath network. At the 2011 Census, the population of the parish was 544.

== History ==
The village's name is probably derived from Old English meaning "Gaega's farm/settlement". The first record of the name was in 1162.

Sited near Watling Street, the ancient way from the ports of Kent to Wroxeter, Gayton was not recorded in the Domesday Book survey of 1086 but was probably the unnamed settlement in the Hundred of Towcester held by the knight Sigar of Chocques, who came from the village of that name near Béthune in the north of France. By 1162 it had passed to his relation Robert V of Béthune, being inherited in turn by his eldest son Robert VI, by his second son William II, by William's eldest son Daniel and then by Daniel's younger brother. This was Robert VII, who in 1242 sold the manor along with virtually all his other English properties to Robert of Guines. In 1248 Robert sold Gayton to Ingram of Fiennes, who in 1270 passed it to Michael of Northampton, a cleric.

Sir Philip de Gayton (d.1316), had two daughters, Scholastica de Gayton (d.1354), who married Godfrey de Meaux, and Julianna, who had a child, Mabila, with her husband Thomas de Murdak. Juliana murdered her husband in 1316 with the assistance of family servants, and later married one, John de Veaux. They were tried for murder in 1321, and Juliana was hung at Tyburn. The facts of this tale have become somewhat confused over the centuries but the de Gayton tombs are in the village church. Another version is that Scholastica murdered her husband and her sister Julianna was burnt as a witch.

Sir Francis Tanfield (d. 1558), built the Manor House in the village according to one source although another source dates it later in the century. This house has some similarity to Sir Thomas Tresham's at Lyveden New Bield (begun by 1594)

Another Sir Francis Tanfield was baptised at Gayton Church on 14 June 1565 and died in 1639. This Sir Francis was the son of Clement Tanfield and his wife, Anne, of Gayton. He was knighted in July 1603 and, in September, accompanied the new ambassador, Lord Spencer, to the court of the Duke of Württemberg, now part of southern Germany. He was governor of Lord Falkland’s Colony of Newfoundland, Canada from 1623 to 1625. It is probable that he set off for Newfoundland with the colonists and settled in Renews, Newfoundland. There were problems between the planters and the fishermen and the colony only lasted for two years.

The Hughes of Gwerclas family, a Welsh family of native royal blood, resided at the Manor House during the late 18th Century.

There were three brickyards in the parish, now all gone and filled in with domestic refuse.

=== Iron ore quarrying ===
The parish was also a source of ironstone which was quarried to the south east of the village, either side of the road to Blisworth up to and just beyond the crossroads with the road from Tiffield to Milton Malsor. The quarries began operation in about 1853 and continued to 1921 with possibly a break round about 1900. The quarries began close to the village and worked their way towards Blisworth as the ore was worked out. Quarrying was by hand with the aid of explosives. The ore was taken away by narrow gauge tramways in wagons pulled by horses for most of that time but a steam locomotive and a petrol engined locomotive were used from 1918. For the most part these tramways led to a standard gauge branch railway which ran from north east of the Gayton-Blisworth road to the main line with a junction facing Nether Heyford. This branch was at various times worked by horses or a steam locomotive. However one of the quarries, which operated between 1863 and 1884 had a tramway which led to another railway. This was the line from Blisworth to Towcester which was built in 1866. This line ran parallel to the earlier branch for most of the earlier branch's course and just to the east of it, but the junction with the main line faced Blisworth Station, rather than Heyford. The wagons from this quarry were lowered down the side of the cutting for the ore be loaded into standard gauge wagons. Until 1891 the ore from Gayton was smelted at Nether Heyford Ironworks but after this closed it was taken elsewhere. More modern quarries at Blisworth had a rail connection with the Northampton Towcester line nearer to Blisworth Station.

There is one gullet left and there are remains of some tramway bridges. Some of the quarried fields are now at a lower level than the roads. The quarried land has been restored to agriculture for the most part.

== Governance ==
The village has a Parish Council. The local council is West Northamptonshire. Prior to local government changes in 2021 the district council was South Northamptonshire where Gayton is in Harpole and Grange ward together with the villages of Milton Malsor, Rothersthorpe, Harpole and Kislingbury and elects two members.

== Facilities ==
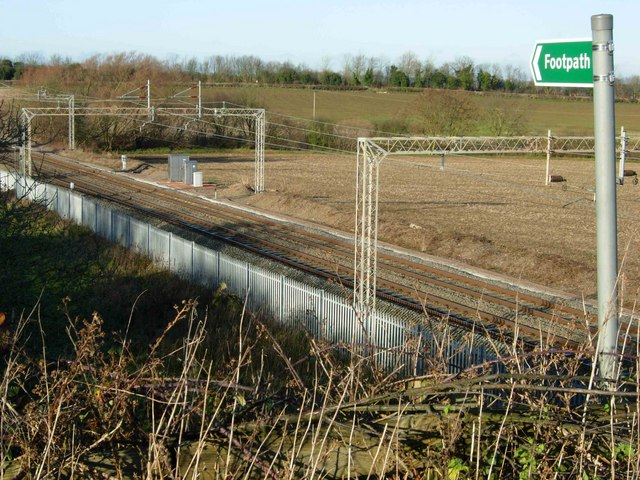
West Coast Main Line near Gayton

There is a church, dedicated to St Mary the Virgin. The base of the tower and font are Norman though the upper part of the tower is 19th century. The church contains six wooden misericords dating from the 14th and 15th centuries, unusually, some of these have been modified at a later date, possibly by foreign carvers. There are monuments to Sir Philip and Scholastica de Gayton, Sir Francis Tanfield and his wife and also Mabila de Murdak, (14th century).

There is also a village hall and primary school, (Gayton Church of England Primary School), one of the smallest in the county with around 60 pupils. It also has one pub. The Eykyn Arms is named after Roger Eykyn who live at Gayton House (probably 18th century, demolished 1972). The Queen Victoria Pub closed in 2016 and in 2017 it was proposed to turn it into flats.

There is a village green with a children's play area, refurbished in 2007.

Gayton is close to the Grand Union Canal (GUC). At Gayton Junction there is a marina and an arm of the GUC goes down to Northampton through a long flight of locks at Rothersthorpe. It is also close to the West Coast Main Line, one of the main railway routes between London and the north-west.

The site of a Roman building, which may have been a temple, is about 800 yards south-east of the village and was excavated in 1840, revealing a bronze statue and 4th-century coins.

== Notable residents ==
- Henry Montagu Butler academic
- Sir Francis Tanfield - see above
- Architect Sir Clough Williams-Ellis was born in Gayton, in 1883, and lived here until the age of four when he was taken to live in his father's native north Wales.
