= Brafield-on-the-Green =

Village in England

Coordinates: 52.2212°N 0.8003°W

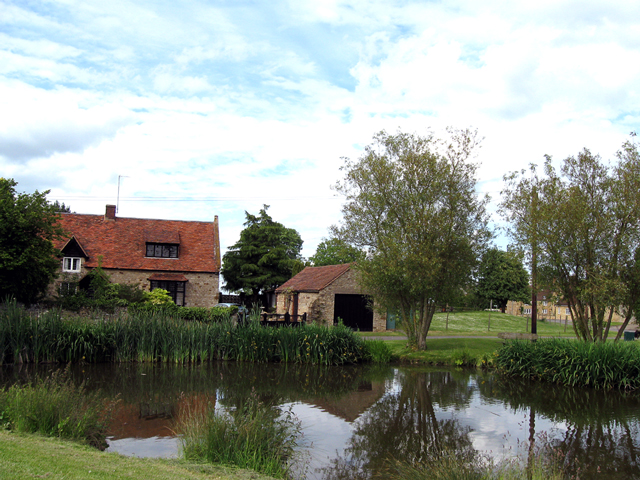
- The village pond

- Location within Northamptonshire
- Population: 636; 666 (2011 census)
- OS grid reference: SP820587
- Unitary authority: West Northamptonshire
- Ceremonial county: Northamptonshire
- Region: East Midlands
- Country: England
- Sovereign state: United Kingdom
- Post town: Northampton
- Postcode district: NN7
- Dialling code: 01604
- Police: Northamptonshire
- Fire: Northamptonshire
- Ambulance: East Midlands
- UK Parliament: Northampton South

Brafield-on-the-Green is a civil parish and small village in West Northamptonshire. Brafield has been inhabited since at least the Iron Age, and there are a number of archaeological sites in the area, including a Bronze Age barrow and a Roman villa.

== History ==
Brafield-on-the-Green was mentioned as a settlement in the Domesday Book, located in the hundred of Wymersley and the county of Northamptonshire. In 1086, it had a recorded population of 15 households, and is listed under three owners.

The village is home to a number of historic buildings, including the Church of St Lawrence, which dates back to the 13th century. The village also has shops, businesses and a traditional pub.

The village's name means 'hill-top open country'.

== Location ==
Brafield is about 4 miles (6.4 km) south-east of Northampton, in the shire county of Northamptonshire known as "Northants" along the A428 road about 16 miles (26 km) north-west of Bedford.

A section of Brafield sits within a conservation area.

== Brafield Stadium ==
Brafield Stadium known as Northampton International Raceway hosts BriSCA Formula 1 Stock Cars. As early as 1949, local entrepreneurs staged midget car racing at the stadium, as part of a national attempt to introduce the sport from the US. It also hosted speedway. The team known as the Flying Foxes took part in the Southern Area League in 1954. The team was renamed the Brafield Badgers and interspersed individual meetings with matches against reserve sides from British League tracks. The speedway closed for good at the end of the 1967 season.
