= Overthorpe, Northamptonshire =

Village in Northamptonshire, England

Coordinates: 52.0647°N 1.2970°W

Overthorpe
- Location within Northamptonshire
- Population: 235 (2011 Census)
- OS grid reference: SP4840
- Unitary authority: West Northamptonshire
- Ceremonial county: Northamptonshire
- Region: East Midlands
- Country: England
- Sovereign state: United Kingdom
- Post town: Banbury
- Postcode district: OX17
- Dialling code: 01295
- Police: Northamptonshire
- Fire: Northamptonshire
- Ambulance: East Midlands
- UK Parliament: South Northamptonshire
- Website: Overthorpe Village Website

Overthorpe is a village and civil parish in West Northamptonshire, about 2 miles (3 km) east of Banbury in Oxfordshire and 1 mile (1.6 km) southeast of junction 11 of the M40 motorway. Overthorpe is in the west of West Northamptonshire, and its western boundary forms part of the boundary with Oxfordshire. It is part of the informal district of Banburyshire.

The 2001 Census recorded the parish's population as 242, reducing slightly to 235 at the 2011 Census.

== History ==
The Manor House is 17th-century, with a Tudor Revival rear extension that was added about 1930. The village has at least three other 17th-century houses and a 17th- or 18th-century barn.

An open field system of farming prevailed in Overthorpe until the 18th century. Traces of ridge and furrow survive north of the village. Overthorpe used to be part of the parish of Middleton Cheney, but its land tenure was linked with that of Warkworth. Parliament passed a single inclosure act for both Overthorpe and Warkworth, the Warkworth Inclosure Act 1764 (4 Geo. 3. c. 67 Pr.).

== Church and chapel ==
There is no church in Overthorpe. It is in the Church of England parish of St Mary, Warkworth, whose 14th-century church is midway between the two villages.

Overthorpe had a nonconformist chapel, but it is now a private house.

== Amenities ==
Carrdus School, at Overthorpe Hall 1/2 mile (800 m) north of the village, is an independent preparatory school.

The Jurassic Way long-distance footpath passes through the village.

== Sources ==
- RCHME, ed. (1982). An Inventory of the Historical Monuments in the County of Northamptonshire. Vol. 4, Archaeological Sites in South-West Northamptonshire. London: Her Majesty's Stationery Office. pp. 101–102.
