= Yardley Gobion =

Village in Northamptonshire, England

Coordinates: 52.09578°N 0.88318°W

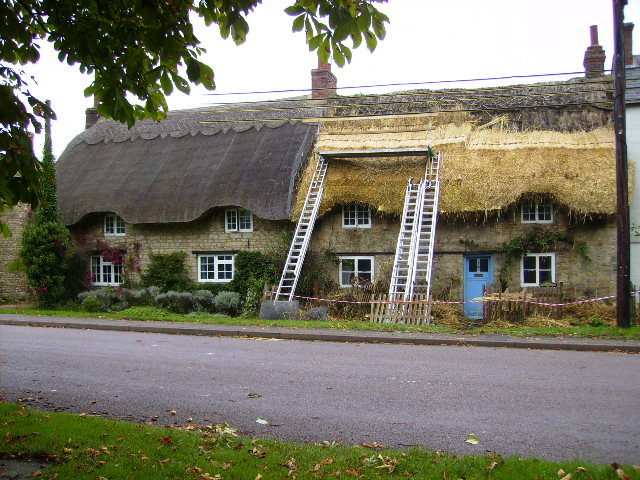
- Thatching in Yardley Gobion

- Location within Northamptonshire
- Interactive map of Yardley Gobion
- Population: 1,300 (2011)
- OS grid reference: SP766447
  - London: 62 miles (100 km) SE
- Civil parish: Yardley Gobion
- Unitary authority: West Northamptonshire
- Ceremonial county: Northamptonshire
- Region: East Midlands
- Country: England
- Sovereign state: United Kingdom
- Post town: TOWCESTER
- Postcode district: NN12
- Dialling code: 01908
- Police: Northamptonshire
- Fire: Northamptonshire
- Ambulance: East Midlands
- UK Parliament: South Northamptonshire

Yardley Gobion (/ˌjɑːrdli ˈɡoʊbiən/ YARD-lee-GOH-bee-ən) is a village and civil parish in West Northamptonshire, England. The village is off a by-pass of the A508 road between Northampton and Milton Keynes.

The village's name means 'rod wood/clearing', where they were made or acquired. Henry Gubyun held land in the village in 1228.

== Governance ==
It has a parish council with 11 members. The parish is in the West Northamptonshire unitary authority area.

== Facilities ==
The Grand Union Canal runs nearby east of the village.

In 1979 it featured on the Blue Peter television series when presenter Simon Groom visited a breeder of St Bernards in the village.

The noted Victorian botanist George Claridge Druce, later Mayor of Oxford, went to school in the village.
