= West Northamptonshire =

District in England

- Unitary authority area
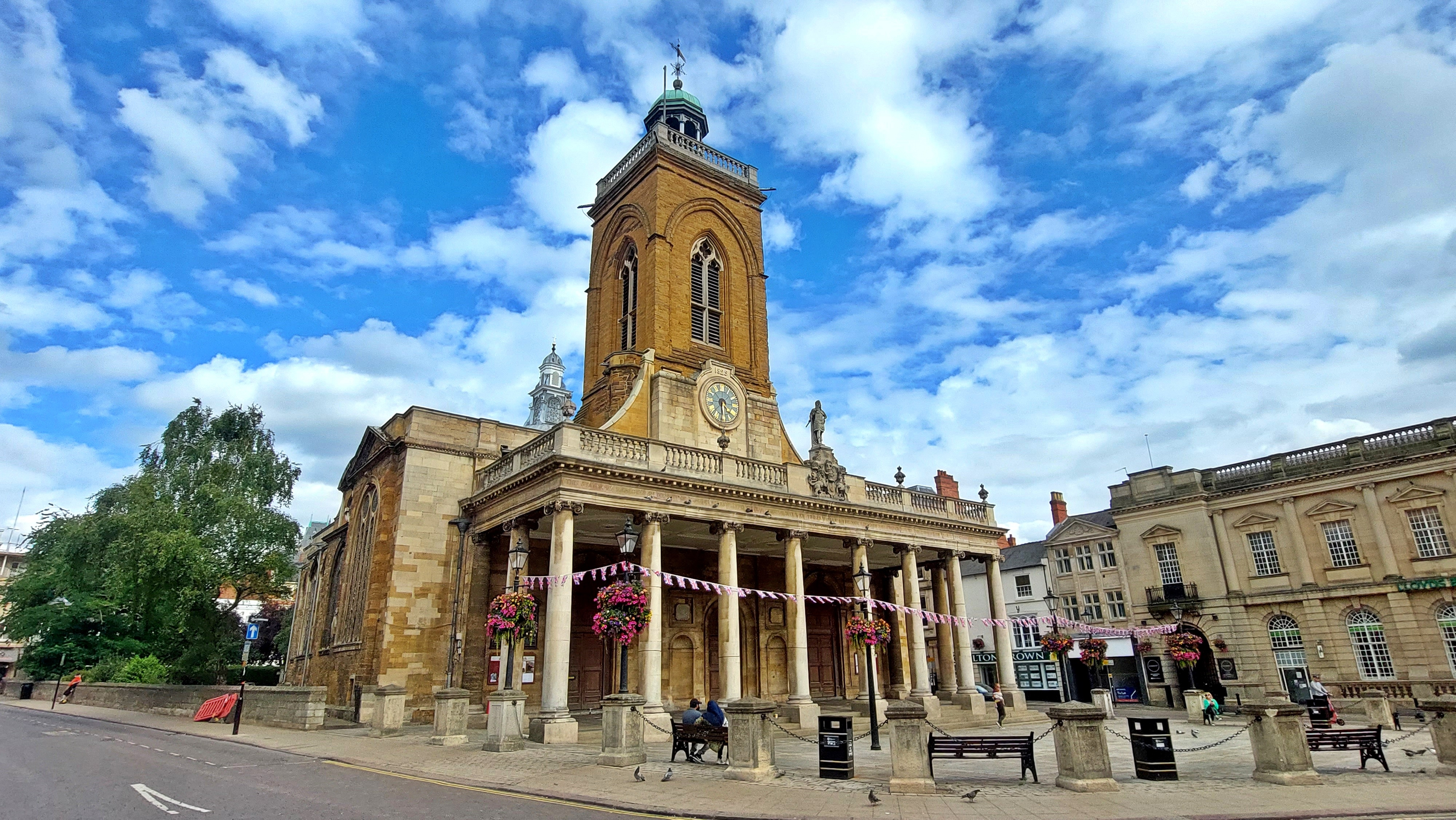
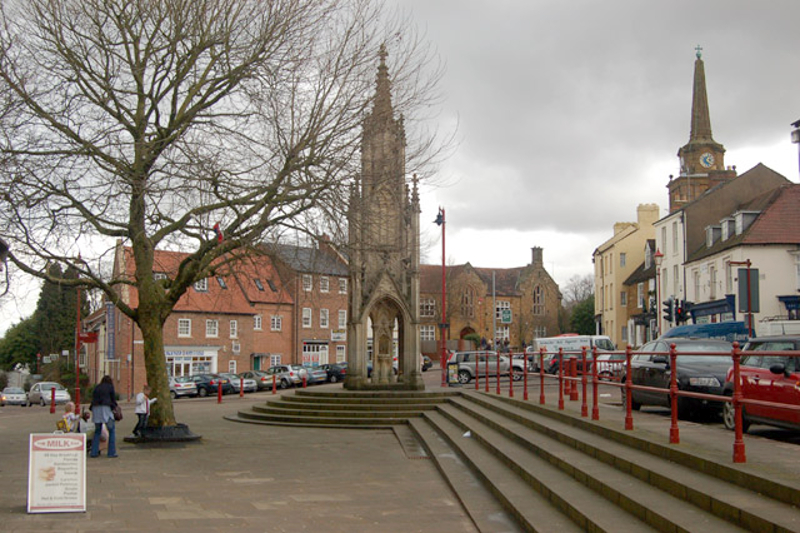
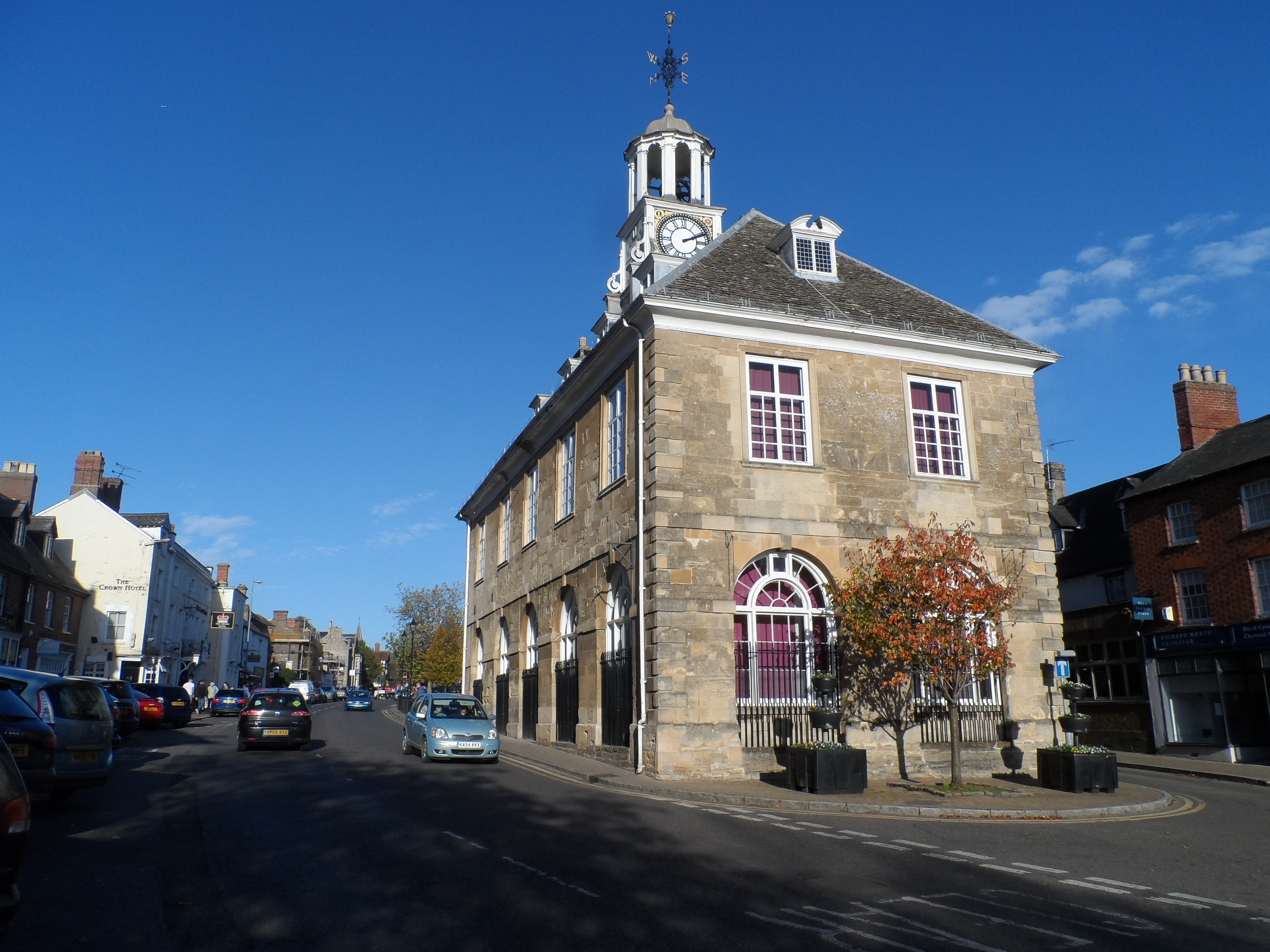
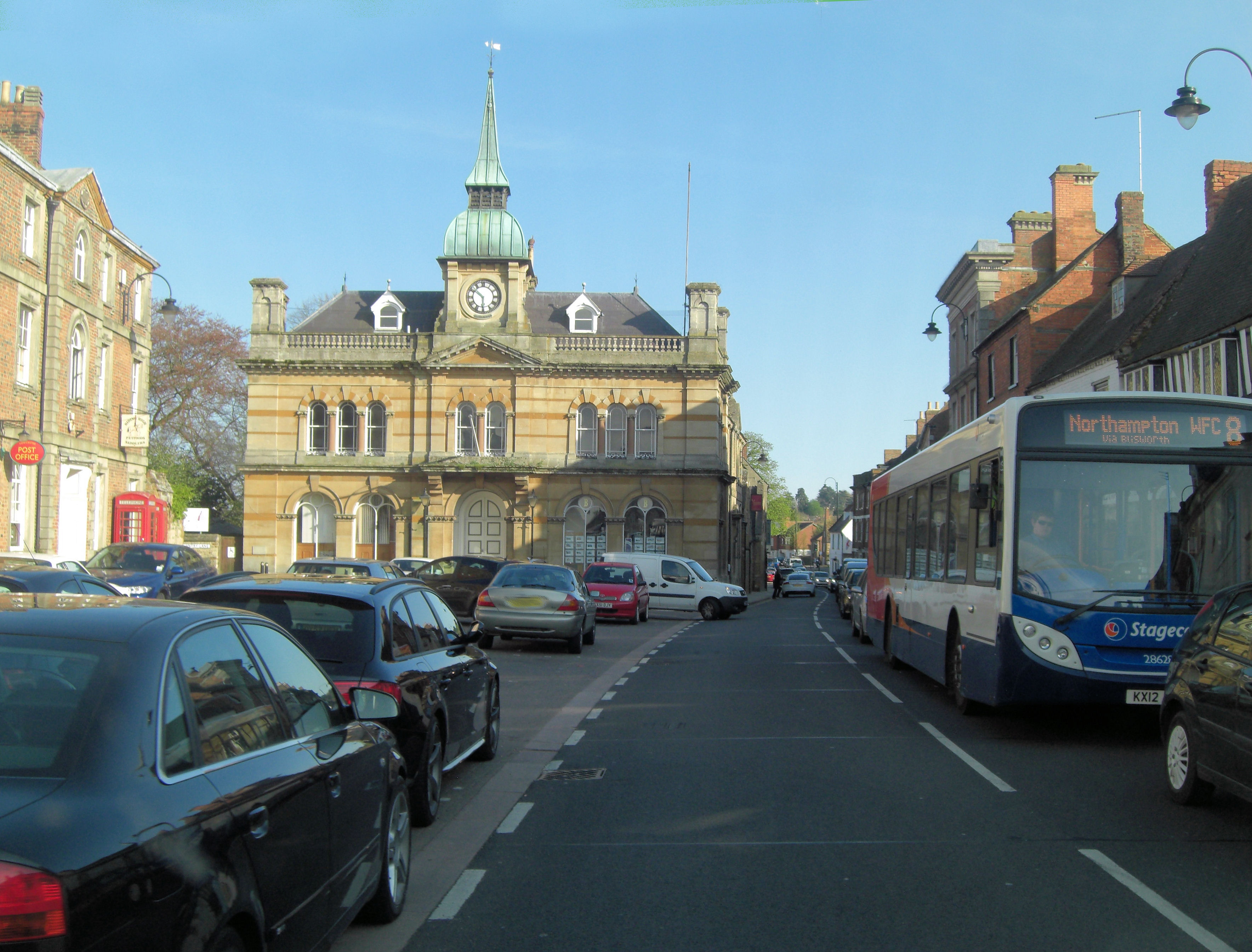
- Northampton, Daventry, Brackley and Towcester

- Coat of arms
- Motto: Ambition, Pride, Unity, Prosperity
- West Northamptonshire shown within Northamptonshire
- Coordinates: 52.237°N 0.895°W
- Sovereign state: United Kingdom
- Country: England
- Region: East Midlands
- Ceremonial county: Northamptonshire
- Incorporated: 1 April 2021
- Administrative HQ: Northampton

Government
  - Type: Unitary authority with leader and cabinet
  - Body: West Northamptonshire Council
  - House of Commons: 4 MPs: Lucy Rigby (L); Stuart Andrew (C); Sarah Bool (C); Mike Reader (L)

Area
  - Total: 530 sq mi (1,380 km^{2})
  - Land: 532 sq mi (1,377 km^{2})
  - Water: 1.2 sq mi (3 km^{2})
  - Rank: 16th

Population (2025)
  - Total: 444,218
  - Rank: 15th
  - Density: 840/sq mi (323/km^{2})

Ethnicity (2021)
  - Ethnic groups: List: 85.9% White; 5.3% Asian; 4.9% Black; 2.8% Mixed; 1.1% other

Religion (2021)
  - Religion: List: 49.5% Christianity; 38.2% no religion; 3.5% Islam; 1.3% Hinduism; 0.4% Sikhism; 0.4% Buddhism; 0.1% Judaism; 0.6% other; 6.1% not stated
- Time zone: UTC+0 (GMT)
  - Summer (DST): UTC+1 (BST)
- Postcode area: NN1-NN7, OX17
- Dialling codes: 01327; 01604
- ISO 3166 code: GB-WNH
- GSS code: E06000062
- ITL code: TLF24
- GVA: 2021 estimate
  - Total: £13.2 billion
  - Per capita: £30,905
- GDP (nominal): 2021 estimate
  - Total: £14.7 billion
  - Per capita: £34,385
- Website: westnorthants.gov.uk

West Northamptonshire is one of two unitary authority areas in the ceremonial county of Northamptonshire, England. It contains the county town of Northampton, as well as the towns of Daventry, Brackley and Towcester, and the large villages of Brixworth and Long Buckby; the rest of the area is predominantly agricultural villages though it has many lakes and small woodlands.

West Northamptonshire was created in 2021 as part of local government restructuring from the previous non-metropolitan districts of Northampton, Daventry and South Northamptonshire.

The West Coast Main Line and the M1 and M40 motorways pass through the district, and it includes the site of the Roman town of Bannaventa and the grade I listed Althorp House and its estate.

== History ==
West Northamptonshire was formed on 1 April 2021 through the merger of the three non-metropolitan districts of Daventry, Northampton, and South Northamptonshire. The new West Northamptonshire Council therefore absorbed the functions of those districts' councils, plus those of the abolished Northamptonshire County Council. West Northamptonshire remains part of the ceremonial county of Northamptonshire for the purposes of lieutenancy and shrievalty.

In March 2018, following financial and cultural mismanagement by the cabinet and officers at Northamptonshire County Council, Secretary of State for Housing, Communities and Local Government, Sajid Javid, sent commissioner Max Caller into the council, who recommended the county council and all-district and borough councils in the county be abolished, and replaced by two unitary authorities, one covering the West, and one the North of the county. These proposals were approved in April 2019. It meant that the districts of Daventry, Northampton and South Northamptonshire were merged to form a new unitary authority called West Northamptonshire, whilst the second unitary authority North Northamptonshire consists of the former Corby, East Northamptonshire, Kettering and Wellingborough districts.

== Governance ==
West Northamptonshire Council provides both county-level and district-level services. The whole area is also covered by civil parishes, which form a second tier of local government.

== Demographics ==
=== Population ===
Population pyramid in 2020

The West Northamptonshire population was estimated to be around 406,733 people in 2020. Using previous administrative boundaries, the population of the West Northamptonshire area was around 375,101 in 2011, and 345,589 in 2001.

==== Gender ====
In 2020, there were an estimated 202,004 men and 204,729 women in West Northamptonshire.

==== Ethnicity ====
Ethnic group	1991		2001		2011	
Ethnic group	Number	%	Number	%	Number	%
White: Total	301,940	96.1%	326,513	94.5%	336,933	89.8%
White: British	–	–	315,127	91.2%	314,924	84%
White: Irish	–	–	4,996		4,011	
White: Gypsy or Irish Traveller	–	–	–	–	214	
White: Other	–	–	6,390		17,784	
Asian or Asian British: Total	6,268	2%	7,224	2.1%	16,063	4.3%
Asian or Asian British: Indian	2,918		3,915		6,471	
Asian or Asian British: Pakistani	563		915		1,789	
Asian or Asian British: Bangladeshi	1,215		1,818		3,474	
Asian or Asian British: Chinese	847		1,495		2,005	
Asian or Asian British: Other Asian	725		576		2,324	
Black or Black British: Total	4,746	1.5%	5,078	1.5%	11,598	3.1%
Black or Black British: Caribbean	2,877		3,077		6,837	
Black or Black British: African	513		1,465		3,298	
Black or Black British: Other Black	1,356		536		1,463	
Mixed or British Mixed: Total	–	–	4,412	1.3%	8,823	2.4%
Mixed: White and Black Caribbean	–	–	2,009		3,819	
Mixed: White and Black African	–	–	353		1,241	
Mixed: White and Asian	–	–	1,130		1,947	
Mixed: Other Mixed	–	–	920		1,816	
Other: Total	1,283	0.4%	867	0.3%	1,684	0.4%
Other: Arab	–	–	–	–	579	
Other: Any other ethnic group	1,283	0.4%	867		1,105	
Total	314,237	100%	345,589	100%	375,101	100%

==== Age structure ====
Age distribution of West Northamptonshire in 2020
0–9 years	10–19 years	20–29 years	30–39 years	40–49 years	50–59 years	60–69 years	70–79 years	80+ years
52,453	48,857	45,494	52,919	54,387	57,322	43,181	34,676	17,865

== Media ==
In terms of television, West Northamptonshire is served by BBC East and ITV Anglia with television signals received from the Sandy Heath transmitter. BBC East Midlands and ITV Central can also be received with the television signals received from the Waltham. However, Daventry is served by BBC West Midlands and ITV Central broadcasting from the Sutton Coldfield TV transmitter. However, southwestern parts of the region such as Brackley, Towcester and Silverstone are served by BBC South and ITV Meridian broadcasting from the Oxford TV transmitter. Radio stations for the area are:

- BBC Local Radio
  - BBC Radio WM (covering Daventry) on 95.6 FM
  - BBC Radio Northampton on 104.2 FM
  - BBC Radio Oxford (covering Brackley, Towcester and Silverstone) on 95.2 FM
- Independent Local Radio
  - Heart East on 96.6 FM
  - Heart South (covering Brackley, Towcester and Silverstone) on 97.4 FM
  - Smooth East Midlands (formerly Connect FM) on 97.2 FM
- Community radio
  - NLive Radio on 106.9 FM
  - Inspiration FM on 107.8 FM

The area is served by these local newspapers: Northampton Chronicle & Echo, Daventry Express and Banbury Guardian which covers Brackley.

== Settlements and parishes ==
For a county-wide list for Northamptonshire see List of places in Northamptonshire

West Northamptonshire is entirely covered by civil parishes, of which there are 166.

- Abthorpe, Adstone, Althorp, Arthingworth, Ashby St Ledgers, Ashton, Aston le Walls, Astrop, Aynho
- Badby, Barby, Blakesley, Blisworth, Boddington, Boughton, Brackley, Bradden, Brafield-on-the-Green, Braunston, Brington, Brixworth, Brockhall, Bugbrooke, Byfield
- Caldecote, Canons Ashby, Castle Ashby, Chacombe, Chapel Brampton, Charlton, Charwelton, Chipping Warden, Church Brampton, Church Stowe, Clay Coton Clipston, Cogenhoe, Cold Ashby, Cold Higham, Cosgrove, Coton, Cottesbrooke, Courteenhall, Creaton, Crick, Croughton, Culworth
- Daventry, Deanshanger, Denton, Dodford, Draughton
- East Farndon, East Haddon, Easton Neston, Edgcote, Elkington, Evenley, Everdon, Eydon
- Farthinghoe, Farthingstone, Flore, Fawsley
- Gayton, Grafton Regis, Grange Park, Great Brington, Great Oxendon, Greatworth, Greens Norton, Grimscote, Guilsborough
- Hackleton, Hanging Houghton, Hannington, Harlestone, Harpole, Hartwell, Haselbech, Hellidon, Helmdon, Hinton-in-the-Hedges, Holcot, Holdenby, Hollowell
- Kelmarsh, Kilsby, King's Sutton, Kislingbury
- Lamport, Lilbourne, Litchborough, Little Brington, Little Houghton, Long Buckby, Lower Catesby
- Maidford, Maidwell, Marston St. Lawrence, Marston Trussell, Middleton Cheney, Milton Malsor, Moreton Pinkney, Moulton
- Naseby, Nether Heyford, Newbottle, Newnham, Northampton, Norton
- Old, Old Stratford, Overthorpe, Overstone
- Passenham, Pattishall, Paulerspury, Pitsford, Potterspury, Preston Capes
- Quinton
- Radstone, Ravensthorpe, Roade, Rothersthorpe
- Scaldwell, Shutlanger, Sibbertoft, Silverstone, Slapton, Spratton, Stanford-on-Avon, Staverton, Stoke Bruerne, Sulby, Sulgrave, Syresham
- Teeton, Thenford, Thornby, Thorpe Mandeville, Tiffield, Towcester
- Upper Catesby, Upper Heyford, Upper Stowe
- Wappenham, Walgrave, Warkworth, Watford, Weedon Bec, Weedon Lois, Welford, Welton, West Haddon, Weston, Whilton, Whiston, Whitfield, Whittlebury, Wicken, Winwick, Woodend, Woodford Halse
- Yardley Gobion, Yardley Hastings, Yelvertoft

=== Locations ===
The district includes the site of the Roman fortified town of Bannaventa, and the grade I listed stately homes of Althorp House (and its estate) and Sulgrave Manor. The ruins of several Iron Age settlements, such as Rainsborough Camp and at Alderton, are also located in West Northamptonshire.

== See also ==
- 2019–2023 structural changes to local government in England
- 2021 West Northamptonshire Council election
- North Northamptonshire, another district created in Northamptonshire in April 2021.
- West Northamptonshire Development Corporation
