= NN postcode area =

Postcode area within the United Kingdom

Northampton
- Postcode area
- Coordinates: 52.296°N 0.837°W
- Country: United Kingdom
- Postcode area: NN
- Postcode area name: Northampton
- Post towns: 8
- Postcode districts: 20
- Postcode sectors: 101
- Postcodes (live): 16,265
- Postcodes (total): 24,901
- Statistics as at May 2020

The NN postcode area, also known as the Northampton postcode area, is a group of nineteen postcode districts in England, within eight post towns. These cover most of Northamptonshire (including Northampton, Kettering, Wellingborough, Corby, Brackley, Daventry, Rushden and Towcester), plus very small parts of Bedfordshire, Buckinghamshire, Leicestershire, Oxfordshire and Warwickshire.

== Coverage ==
The approximate coverage of the postcode districts:

| Postcode district | Post town | Coverage | Local authority area(s) |
|---|---|---|---|
| NN1 | NORTHAMPTON | Northampton | West Northamptonshire |
| NN2 | NORTHAMPTON | Kingsthorpe, Boughton | West Northamptonshire |
| NN3 | NORTHAMPTON | Abington (East), Bellinge, Blackthorn, Boothville, Ecton Brook, Great Billing, Headlands, Kingsley Park, Lings, Little Billing, Moulton, Moulton Park, Parklands, Rectory Farm, Round Spinney, Southfields, Spinney Hill, Standens Barn, Thorplands, Weston Favell | West Northamptonshire |
| NN4 | NORTHAMPTON | Brackmills, Delapré, East Hunsbury, Far Cotton, Grange Park, Great Houghton, Hardingstone, West Hunsbury, Wootton | West Northamptonshire |
| NN5 | NORTHAMPTON | Duston, New Duston Kings Heath, St James, Dallington, Spencer, St Crispins, Upton, Sixfields | West Northamptonshire |
| NN6 | NORTHAMPTON | Brixworth, Chapel Brampton, Church Brampton, Cold Ashby, Crick, Earls Barton, Ecton, Guilsborough, Long Buckby, Naseby, Spratton, Stanford-on-Avon, Sywell, Welford, West Haddon, East Haddon, Yelvertoft | West Northamptonshire, North Northamptonshire, Harborough |
| NN7 | NORTHAMPTON | Blisworth, Bugbrooke, Castle Ashby, Cogenhoe, Dodford, Flore, Gayton, Grendon, Hackleton, Harpole, Harlestone, Hartwell, Horton, Milton Malsor, Nether Heyford, Piddington, Preston Deanery, Quinton, Roade, Rothersthorpe, Stoke Bruerne, Weedon Bec, Yardley Hastings | West Northamptonshire, North Northamptonshire |
| NN8 | WELLINGBOROUGH | Wellingborough, Wilby | North Northamptonshire |
| NN9 | WELLINGBOROUGH | Wellingborough, Chelveston, Finedon, Great Harrowden, Irthlingborough, Little Harrowden, Raunds, Hargrave | North Northamptonshire |
| NN10 | RUSHDEN | Rushden, Higham Ferrers, Wymington | North Northamptonshire, Bedford |
| NN11 | DAVENTRY | Daventry, Braunston, Hinton, Moreton Pinkney, Welton, Lower Shuckburgh, Aston le Walls | West Northamptonshire, Stratford-on-Avon |
| NN12 | TOWCESTER | Towcester, Abthorpe, Caswell, Grafton Regis, Greens Norton, Silverstone, Weston, Yardley Gobion | West Northamptonshire, Buckinghamshire |
| NN13 | BRACKLEY | Brackley, Croughton, Farthinghoe, Hinton-in-the-Hedges, Westbury, Turweston, Mixbury | West Northamptonshire, Buckinghamshire, Cherwell |
| NN14 | KETTERING | Broughton, Desborough, Geddington, Isham, Pytchley, Rothwell, Thorpe Malsor, Thrapston, Hardwick | North Northamptonshire |
| NN15 | KETTERING | Kettering (south), Burton Latimer, Barton Seagrave | North Northamptonshire |
| NN16 | KETTERING | Kettering (north and town centre), Weekley, Warkton | North Northamptonshire |
| NN17 | CORBY | Corby, Weldon, Gretton, Bulwick | North Northamptonshire |
| NN18 | CORBY | Great Oakley, Little Oakley | North Northamptonshire |
| NN29 | WELLINGBOROUGH | Bozeat, Great Doddington, Irchester, Podington, Wollaston | Bedford, North Northamptonshire |
| NN99 | | | non-geographic |

== Map ==
NN postcode area map, showing postcode districts in red and post towns in grey text, with links to nearby CV, LE, MK, OX and PE postcode areas.

== See also ==
- Postcode Address File
- List of postcode areas in the United Kingdom
