= Abthorpe =

Village in England

Coordinates: 52.113°N 1.052°W

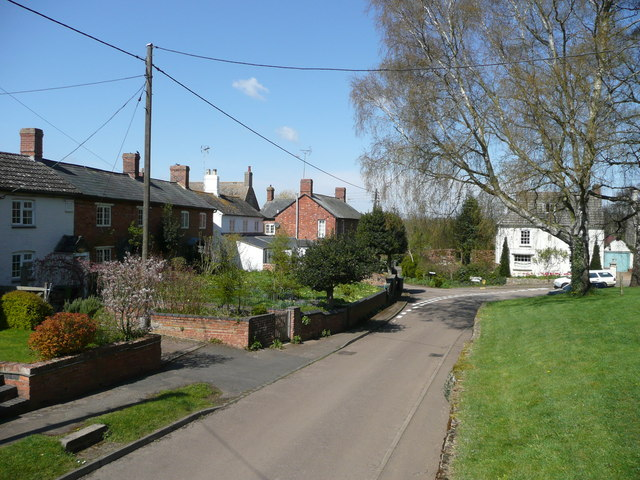
- Village street

- Location within Northamptonshire
- Population: 285; 307 (2010 est)
- OS grid reference: SP6546
  - London: 63 miles (101 km)
- Civil parish: Abthorpe
- Unitary authority: West Northamptonshire
- Ceremonial county: Northamptonshire
- Region: East Midlands
- Country: England
- Sovereign state: United Kingdom
- Post town: Towcester
- Postcode district: NN12
- Dialling code: 01327
- Police: Northamptonshire
- Fire: Northamptonshire
- Ambulance: East Midlands
- UK Parliament: Current: Daventry From next general election: South Northamptonshire
- Website: Abthorpe a Northamptonshire Village

Abthorpe is a village and civil parish in the valley of the River Tove in West Northamptonshire, England, about 4 miles (6.4 km) west of Towcester, 2 miles (3.2 km) northwest of Silverstone and approximately midway between London and Birmingham.

The 2001 census recorded 285 people living in the village: 144 male, 141 female in 123 dwellings with a further 3 homes empty and further 3 second or holiday homes. At the 2011 census the population (including Foscote hamlet) was recorded as 311.

== Geography ==
Abthorpe parish is within a rolling rural landscape, typical of South Northamptonshire. It lies mostly on the south side of the River Tove, but the southern part of the parish is on the north side of Silverstone Brook, a tributary of the Tove, which it joins in Towcester. The lowest point in the parish is about 308 feet (94 m) above sea level, and the highest point is at 486 feet (148 m) at the divide between the Tove and the River Great Ouse.

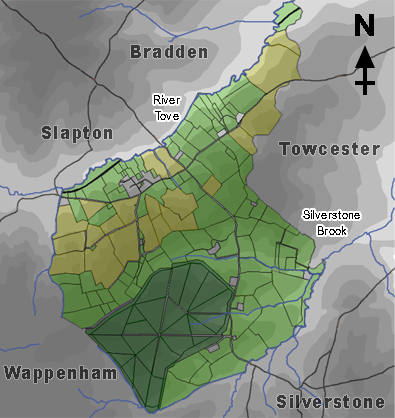
Abthorpe Parish

The neighbouring parishes are Wappenham, Towcester, Silverstone, Slapton and Bradden, and the boundary is about 9.75 miles (15.69 km) around, enclosing 1,964 acres (795 ha) of land.

The main village area itself makes up less than 1% of the parish, and all buildings included still adds up to less than 2%. The majority of fields are grass, covering around 54%, used mainly for sheep and cows, but horses are also kept. Wheat and to a lesser extent barley make up about 21% of the land usage, woodland covers another 20%. This is almost all Bucknell Wood which covers the elevated part of the parish, and is part of the Whittlewood Forest.

== History ==
The villages name means 'Abba's outlying farm/settlement'.

Abthorpe was part of the Church of England parish of Towcester and had a chapel of ease from at least the 14th century. Abthorpe was made a separate ecclesiastical parish in 1737, after which the parish church was restored. In 1869 it was demolished and the present Church of England parish church of Saint John the Baptist, designed by Ewan Christian, was built in 1869-71. It is now a member of the Whittlewood Parishes, a Church of England Benefice that includes also the parishes of Paulerspury, Silverstone, Slapton and Whittlebury.

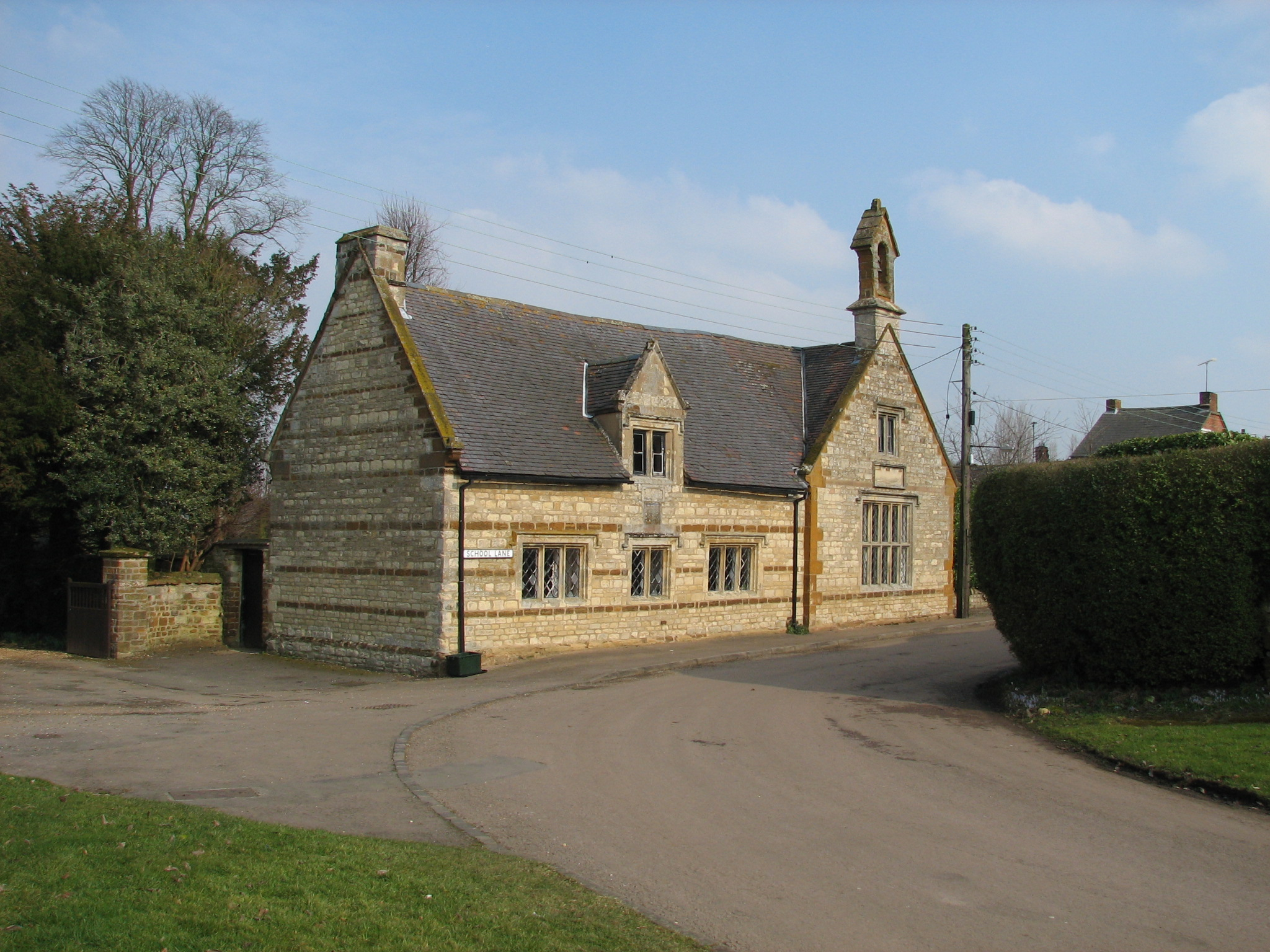
Abthorpe village hall

Abthorpe had a medieval deer park. This is likely to have been Bucknell Wood, which has the rounded outline characteristic of such a park. On 20 December 1537 Sir William Parr reported to Thomas Cromwell that:

On Monday night last about 30 persons, 20 of whom were well horsed, came to Lord Mountjoy's park at Abthorpe, killed almost all the deer and took and bound one of Ric. Cecile's servants dwelling in Abthorpe. As Abthorpe is 24 miles from Parre's house, Sir Humfrey Stafford, who sent him word of it, caused his son to follow them. Such a thing was never done in these parts since he knew them. In his opinion it deserves great punishment. Asks whether he shall search in the adjoining shires for the procurers.

The next day Parr updated Cromwell:

According to his letter, dated 21st inst., has endeavoured to find out the persons who made the spoil in Lord Mountjoy's park at Abthorpe. Can get no perfect knowledge but that Sir John St. John, Sir John Parkar, and Sir Robt. Kirkham are suspected. Sends the confession of one Thos. Bright, who was sent to gaol at Northampton on St. Thomas day before Christmas.

The oldest part of the village school was built in 1642 by local landowner, Jane Leeson, during the English Civil War. It is now the village hall.

Abthorpe was part of the Grafton Estate. Charlock Farmhouse, Foscote House and Hill House were all built for the estate in about 1840.

== Amenities ==
The village has a public house, the New Inn.
