= Bury Mount =

Coordinates: 52.133°N 0.988°W

Bury Mount Motte is the remains of an earthwork motte and bailey fortification or ancient castle in Towcester in Northamptonshire, and has been designated a Scheduled Ancient Monument. The Motte probably dates back to the 11th century when it was a Norman fortification, but over time it has been subject to neglect.

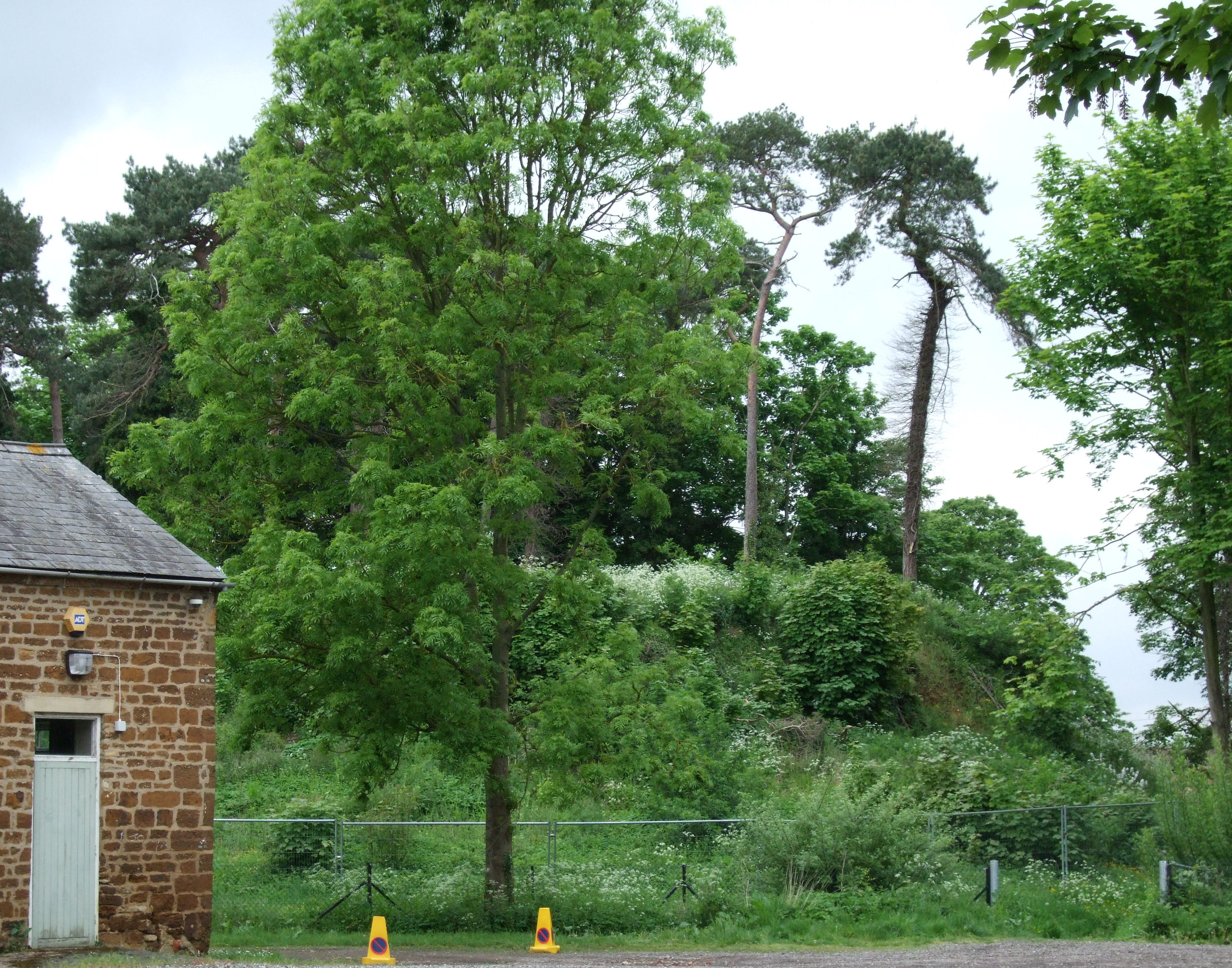
Bury Mount looking north west from the banks of the River Tove, May 2008

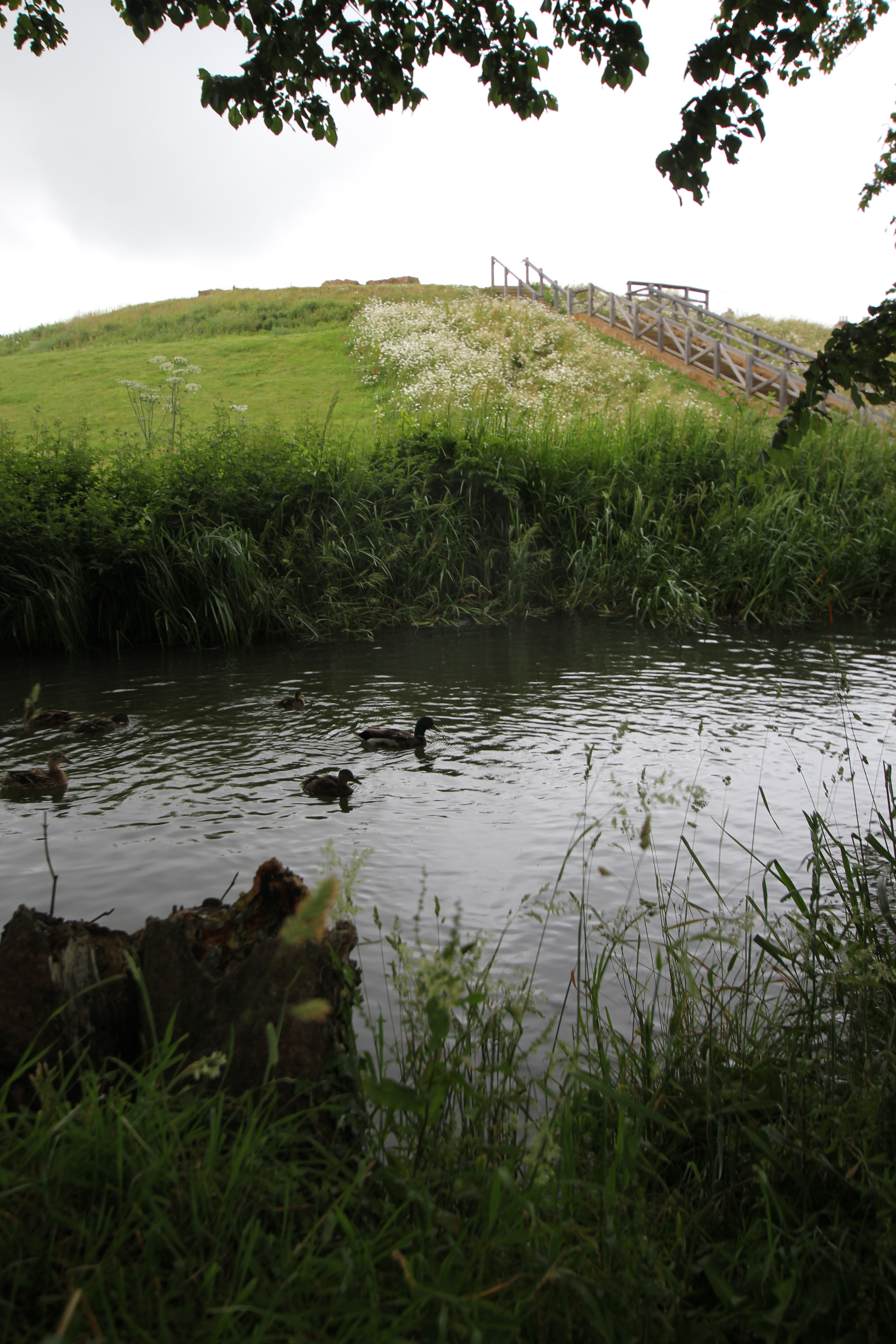
Bury Mount in July 2012 after restoration with the Mill Stream off the River Tove in the foreground

== Location ==
The Motte is in Moat Lane in the Roman town of Towcester, England, located on the Roman road of Watling Street, now the A5 trunk road which runs from Dover to Wroxeter via London. It is similar to other local mottes located at Northampton, Buckingham, Little Houghton and Newport Pagnell, Buckinghamshire. It would have been strategically placed to control primary transport routes and river crossings. The Towcester Motte controlled the junction of Watling Street and the long-distance route from Southampton to Stamford, which went through Winchester, Oxford, Brackley and Northampton, now the A34 and A43 trunk roads. The motte is located in Towcester on the north-east side of the A5 in Moat Lane, at the side of Towcester Town Hall next to St Lawrence's Church and near the Forum Building which is the home of South Northamptonshire Council; the mount also lies east of the market square. Bury Mount can also be reached by walking down Castle Lane, which is off of Watling Street.

== Construction ==
It comprised a small bailey and a tall motte surrounded by a large ditch. The motte may not have been of the standard conical mound form. More historical details are described on the South Northant's Council's website including the restoration project for the motte and all the Moat Lane area.

== History ==
The most likely period for its construction was the Great Anarchy period (1135–1152), when England was divided between the supporters of King Stephen and Empress Matilda. It was about the time that the Manor of Towcester passed from the Crown to the St. Hiliary family. The castle would have been used as a symbol of power, been the residence of the lord of the manor's bailiff or reeve, an encampment for troops and cavalry raised during periods of hostility and offer hospitality to the lord and his retinue whilst travelling. It was to be dominated by a large motte surrounded by a ditch and topped by a tower which created both a stronghold and a watchtower.

Documentary evidence shows that in the 15th century there was a gate at the junction of the two lanes leading into the bailey. In this area would be living quarters for the constable of the castle and the small permanent garrison, detached kitchens, a brewhouse, barns and sheds for storage of food and equipment, stabling, privies, a well and accommodation for livestock. It would have been tightly packed with buildings and would have bustled with activity when fully garrisoned.

The traditional view is that earth mottes had palisades around the summit of the motte which was approached by a flying bridge or ladder and within this well defended upper section would have been a tall timber tower. The few excavations of mottes that have occurred show they varied considerably in form. There is the possibility that Bury Mount does not follow the standard form. In 1392 it was described as a mound tower within a moat, which suggests that it would have had a stone tower as a wooden tower is unlikely at that date. Shortly before 1824, possibly whilst they were excavating away the south-west section of the mount to construct a cottage, a "subterraeneous arched passage fifteen yards in length" was found. These two documentary sources suggest that the motte may have been of a similar type to the motte excavated at South Mimms, Hertfordshire in the 1960s. Although the South Mimms motte looked like a typical castle earthwork they found that "the tower was set within the motte, and the entrance to the castle was gained via a tunnel through the motte into the tower". Most of the mound at South Mimms had been revetted so that little of the motte was visible. It was probably built around 1141 by the Earl of Essex. If the Towcester motte is of this form then it would be rare survival.

In 1392, during the ownership of Reginald de Grey, Baron Grey of Ruthyn, a record of the manor in Towcester was made. Within the castle site was the manorial hall aligned north–south, which would have housed the bailiff and important guests and also be the place where the manorial court was held. It had chambers at both ends. The southern chamber, facing towards the gate appears to have been principal first-floor chamber, usually called a solar, which like the Hall had a stone slated roof. The other chamber was thatched, suggesting that it may have been the bailiff's accommodation. Adjacent was a detached kitchen which with a stable attached. Both were thatched with straw. There were two great barns which were "at a distance" plus an oxhouse with stable and carthouse under one roof, a dovecote and a sheepfold for 200 sheep.

In the late 15th century the Manor castle appears to have been vacated and a new Manor House constructed in Park Street Towcester. Part of this building still survives and is known as the Mint House.

In the winter of 1643/4 Towcester became the winter headquarters of the Royalist cavalry under Prince Rupert. The town was re-fortified and Bury Mount was converted into a platform for 2 cannon which was probably slighted when the Royalists left in the spring of 1644. From then on Bury Mount was used as an orchard and then as gardens for a cottage built at the foot of the mound. The cottages have now been demolished.

== Restoration ==
The remains were restored in 2008 with an access ramp, landscaping around the River Tove and mill stream and explanatory plaques. During 2013-2016 South Northamptonshire Council implemented the Moat Lane Regeneration Scheme which centred on the Mount. This saw the building of the Forum to which the district council relocated in early 2015, plus homes and small retail units. There is also renovation of other older historic buildings in the area and empty cottages which are in Moat Lane.

The below list shows 15 key moments in Towcester's history that have been commemorated by inscriptions in the inset stones on the spiral path to the top of Bury Mount:

0AD Catuvellauni tribe ritual burial site in Towcester.
Under the Watermeadows (between Bury Mount and the River Tove) is an important iron age ritual burial site.
43AD Romans build Watling Street through Towcester.
Roman Towcester likely began as a staging post for officials on two Roman roads, Watling Street, which joined the Legionary forts at Dover and Wroxeter, and the early road to Alchester (Bicester), where it joined the Akeman Street. The Alchester Road eventually extended to Winchester, and ran a similar course to the modern A43. (Ref 1,2).
917AD Vikings attack Saxons in first Battle of Towcester.
Following the treaty of Wedmore in 884/6 between the Vikings and the Saxon King Alfred of Wessex, Watling Street became the frontier. Alfred's son, King Edward the Elder of Wessex, reinforced the frontier by building a network of fortified towns, called "burhs", defended by timber faced banks and ditches manned by a local levy of one man per 4ft of wall. In 917 A.D. the Danish armies from Northampton and Leicester attacked the "burh of Towcester", but the people of Towcester fought bravely all day and managed to defend the town until help arrived, and the Vikings went away. (Ref 2).
1139-55AD The Normans build a castle at Towcester.
The Normans (1066-1155) built a motte and bailey castle at Towcester. What remains of it is known as Bury Mount. (Ref 3).
1448AD Archdeacon Sponne founds Towcester Chantry & Grammar School.
Archdeacon Sponne purchased the Tabard Inn with adjoining lands in 1440 and in his will left the income to found a chantry and school in Towcester, help the poor and repair the footways in the town. The school is now called Sponne School; the Tabard Inn is now called the Sponne Shopping Centre; and the Chantry House still exists. (Ref 4)
1505AD Towcestrian Richard Empson beheaded by Henry VIII.
Sir Richard Empson, born in Towcester, was a Knight, High lawyer, MP for Northamptonshire, Speaker of the House of Commons, High Steward of Cambridge University and Chancellor of the Duchy of Lancaster. With his colleague Edmund Dudley he raised taxes for his master, King Henry VII, using extortion, harassment, and other dubious, but legal, means. This made him very unpopular, but made the king very rich. When Henry VII died and Henry VIII became king he arrested the two men. They were sent to Northampton, tried on a trumped up charge of treason and were beheaded on Tower Hill on 17 August 1510. At the time of his arrest Richard Empson was quite wealthy, owning the Manor and Hundred of Towcester, the manors of Easton Neston, Hulcote, Alderton, Stoke Bruerne, Shutlanger, Bradden, Cold Higham, Grimscote, Potcote and Burton Latimer and lands in other parts of the country.(Ref 5).
1605AD Gun Powder Plotters flee London through Towcester.
In November 1605 a certain Ambrose Rookwood made preparations for a rapid journey from London to Dunchurch by placing relays of horses at the chief posting houses on Watling Street, including Towcester. It turned out that this was to speed the escape of the gunpowder plot conspirators from London to Catesby's house at Ashby St Ledgers. Guy Fawkes and seven other conspirators were later executed. (Ref 6).
1633AD Non conformists leave Towcester for the New World.
Rev. Thomas Shepard, born in Towcester and educated at the Chantry School (now Sponne School), together with Thomas Hooker and other non-conformist ministers - Samuel Stone and Rev. John Cotton - left Towcester for the New World. They took part in the foundation of Harvard University and, with the family of Thomas Lord, also born in Towcester, the city of Hartford, Connecticut.
1643AD Towcester becomes a Civil War garrison town.
The English Civil War was between King (Charles I) and Parliament (Oliver Cromwell). King Charles's army spent the winter of 1643-1644 at Towcester, which he defended with guns, including two cannons placed on Bury Mount which was probably taller in those days and overlooked both the Watling Street and the road to Northampton. King Charles was later defeated at the Battle of Naseby and was beheaded at Whitehall in 1649.
1702AD William Fermor commissions Hawksmoor to build Easton Neston House and park.
Nine years after the execution of Richard Empson (1510) his lands in Towcester were bought by Richard Fermor, and they remained in the possession of the Fermor Hesketh family until 2005. In 1671 William Fermor, who had inherited the estates, married Jane, a cousin of Sir Christopher Wren. In the later 1680s he decided to rebuild Easton Neston. The two wings were built first, and one still survives, its design reflective of the design of the Office of Works under Wren. Nicholas Hawksmoor, Wren's brilliant assistant, designed the main house. Work started in the 1690s; the main fabric was completed in 1702; and the work was completed in the late 1720s. (Ref 7).
1780AD The Golden age of Coaching Inns at Towcester.
Towcester thrived as a coaching town until the coming of the railways when coach travel ceased. The Tabard Inn, which provided lodgings from before the 15th century until the 20th century, is now the Sponne Shopping Centre. The George Inn existed in 1708, but after a fire in 1749 it and an adjacent inn were rebuilt as the White Horse Inn, now called Museum Court. Towcester had other large coaching inns, including The Saracens Head and The Angel next to The Tabard, now a private house, and also many smaller inns. The coaches entered the inns through archways many of which still exist. (Ref 8).
1836-7AD Dickens visits the Saracens Head and reflects on his stay in the Pickwick Papers.
The Saracen's Head dates from the 18th century. Charles Dickens stayed here often, and wrote in the Pickwick Papers that "a very good little dinner could be got ready in half an hour". The name was changed to the Pomfret Arms in the 19th century but later changed back. (Ref 8).
1876AD First horse race at Towcester Racecourse.
Her Imperial Majesty, the Empress of Austria, paid a visit to England in 1876 and rented Easton Neston House, with its fine stabling for her horses. During this visit she established a race meeting of her own; a course was laid out in Easton Neston Park and a stand erected for guests. After she had left Towcester, a meeting at the Pomfret Arms decided to repeat the steeplechase meeting and Sir Thomas Fermor-Hesketh gave a 51 year lease to hold Easter Monday races at Easton Neston Park. The course is still used for race meetings and corporate events. (Ref 7).
1948AD First motor race at Silverstone Airfield.
Silverstone Airfield was built at Luffield Abbey Farm during WW2. After the war the concrete runways were used for motor racing. In the early days there were no pits at the Silverstone circuit and so the racing cars were serviced and fuelled in Towcester.
2009AD Bury Mount restored at the heart of Towcester
