= Honour of Grafton =

Set of manors in Northamptonshire, England

The Honour of Grafton is a contiguous set of manors in the south of Northamptonshire, England up to the county's eastern border with Buckinghamshire. Its dominant legacies are semi-scattered Whittlewood Forest and a William Kent wing of Wakefield Lodge in the body of that woodland.

Other legacies are few or abolished. Titles of lord of the manor are now, in English law, entirely without privileges. Owning of local powers and most other vestigial manorial rights, such as fisheries, rentcharges, ground rents, tolls, is void unless already registered against the associated freeholds and agreed with owners of serviant or encumbered land, or demonstrable and in writing as to the few remaining unregistered lands in England.

== Scope and date ==
It dates back beyond 1542, in the reign of Henry VIII when a bill for its management is known before parliament.

As with all honours there were exclusions for church lands (such as glebe), waste, land freed of the manor (freeholds) who nonetheless paid tithes to the rectories, many of which belonged to the honour, among which some lesser manors of parishes. Modern villages, as parishes, within the Honour comprise: Abthorpe, Alderton, Ashton, Blakesley, Blisworth, Cold Higham, Furtho, Grafton Regis, Greens Norton, Hartwell, Passenham, Paulerspury, Potterspury, Roade, Stoke Bruerne, Shutlanger, Silverstone, Towcester, Whittlebury, and Yardley Gobion, and also encompass Whittlewood Forest.

All these are in West Northamptonshire and close to Milton Keynes.

== Grant by monarch to new owner ==
In 1673 the Honour was granted outright to Catherine of Braganza, the queen of Charles II of England.

== Passing to Dukes of Grafton, Wakefield Lodge and cessation of manorial law ==
By automatic process, operation of law, it passed to the main heir of the body of Henry Bennet, 1st Earl of Arlington (one of the C.A.B.A.L., a leading government of Charles II) as he predeceased the queen's death of 1705 – thus to Charles FitzRoy, 2nd Duke of Grafton, his grandson. This dukedom had been created for one of Charles II's favoured sons, mothered by Lady Castlemaine, Barbara Palmer made Duchess of Cleveland. Wakefield Lodge, near Potterspury, was rebuilt by the 2nd Duke as his residence in Northamptonshire, but the main ducal seat is Euston Hall, Suffolk and its similar land holding. The successive Dukes kept their Northamptonshire estates until 1921.

The William Kent wing and grounds though some more agricultural than at the time are all that remains of a hunting lodge/country house of 1748 to 50 designed by William Kent for the 2nd Duke of Grafton with later two-century additions and alterations. Some additions demolished and other alterations were made 1946-48 via architect A.G.S. Butler for Norman See. It is in limestone laid ashlar, has a slate roof and stone lateral and ridge stacks. It has two storeys, basement and, attic across a 7-window range to an H-plan. Centrally it has 6-panel double-leaf doors with an overlight flanked by 15-pane sash windows with elliptical-arched heads. It has a single-storey 3-bay portico approached by a curving, double-arm, balustraded stairway. It has tuscan columns with strong entasis, balustrades between columns, and a plain entablature originally with balustraded parapet, removed in the 20th century. Venetian windows exist to the ground floor either side of portico and to the projecting wings with elliptical-arched heads, stone balustrades and blank side panels. Centrally the lst floor windows form a tripartite lunette-shaped composition widely divided. Lunettes are in place either side and to the wings with blank side panels. The attic storeys end with open pediments and have 6-pane sash windows with stone lintels. The 5-bay attic between is an addition of about 1840. The building has lunette windows to its basement, a plinth, has sill bands, then has a giant dentilled cornice at 1st floor level, and a band and moulded cornice at the attic floor level. The wings have been extended 1 bay to the rear. A 2-storey rendered brick-built addition leads on to rear of the main range. A mid nineteenth century columned porch is to the left side, made of rendered brick. A single storey 20th century kitchen is annexed. Inside the 3-bay centre hides a hall in the style of Inigo Jones's Queen's House, Greenwich with a balustraded gallery on console brackets at first floor level on all four sides. It has a stone-paved floor, large stone chimneypiece with spear and intertwined bows to side piers and bear's head to left pier, badger's head to right pier. A compartmented ceiling hangs over with a garter stair to the central circular panel with deep divisions with guilloche patterns. The circular, stone, cantilever staircase winds up in the style of the Queen's House with a wrought-iron balustrade with S curves and a mahogany handrail. Original plasterwork ceilings are to the study and present billiard room – before likely a dining room. The drawing room and staircase to the other side of the hall were remodelled per Butler-drawn plans. The present dining room is said to have been a library citing its late 18th century decoration: curved to one end with a round-arched door flanked by round-arched recesses, a deep coved ceiling with simple plasterwork. Original stone chimneypieces throw back the study, billiard room and bedrooms. A stone-vaulted basement below the hall has rooms at either end.

Manorial rights ceased gradually – and finally by the Law of Property Act 1925 which was enacted under a progressive phase of UK politics. Often flowing with manors, tithes enjoyed as rectories of this honour had been commuted (largely ended) for a lump sum and apportionment of residual liabilities as in the rest of England, by the late 1930s but chiefly for those well-published sums in most county histories written and many national topographies such as that by Samuel Lewis about one hundred years before.

== Gallery ==
The main seat, Wakefield Lodge, is several times shown in paintings such as:

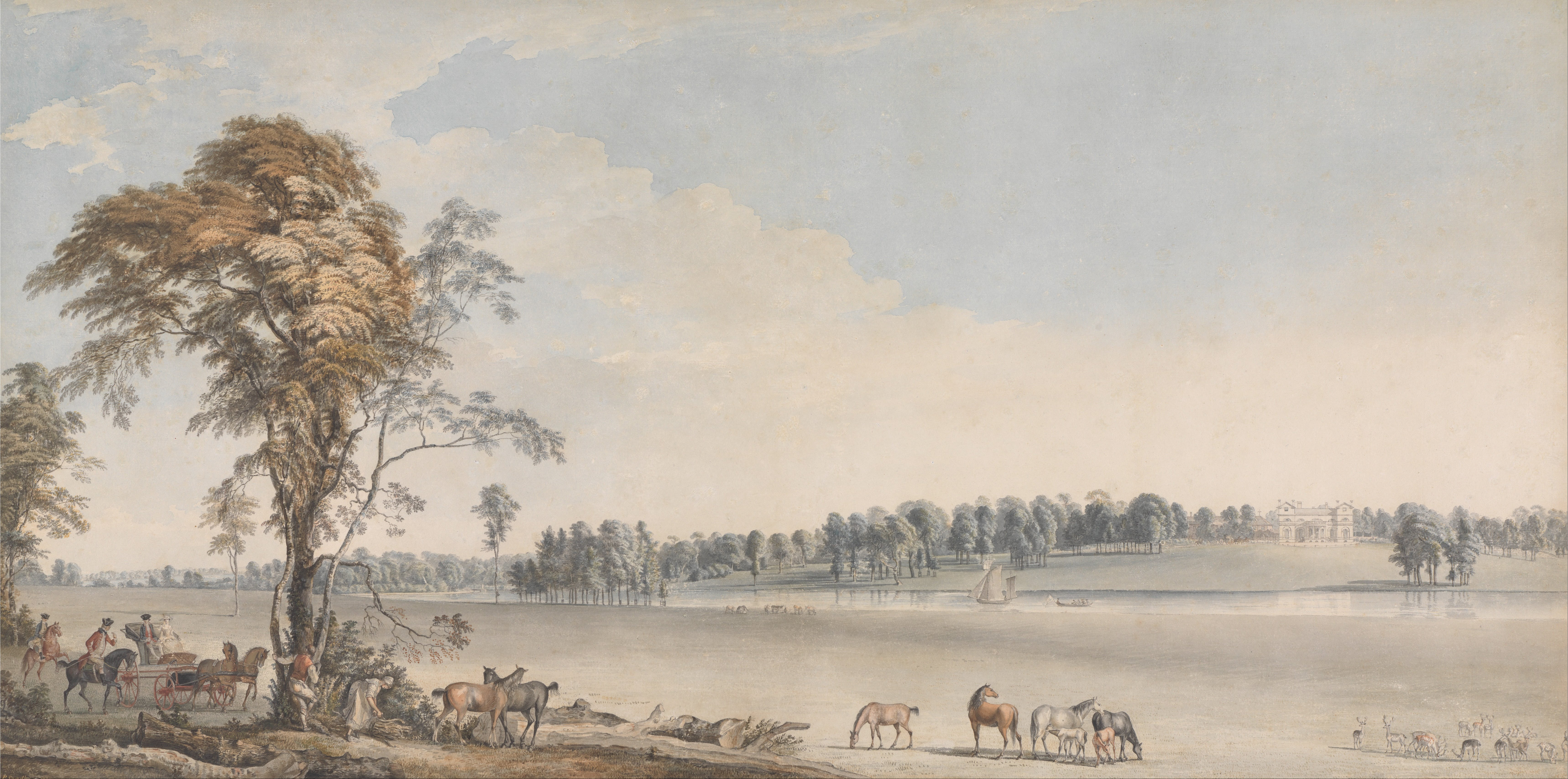
... in 1767

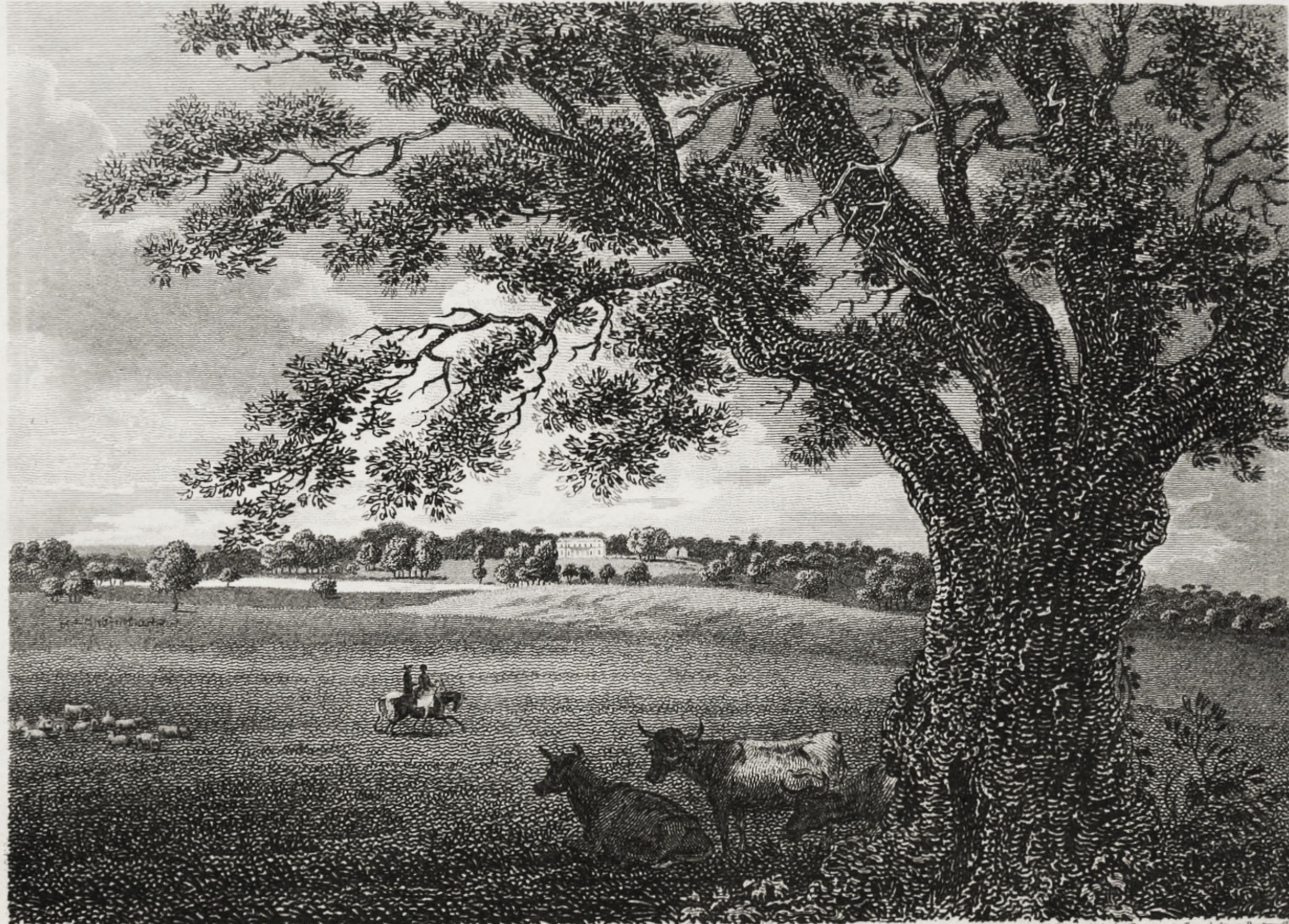
in 1806 (engraving)

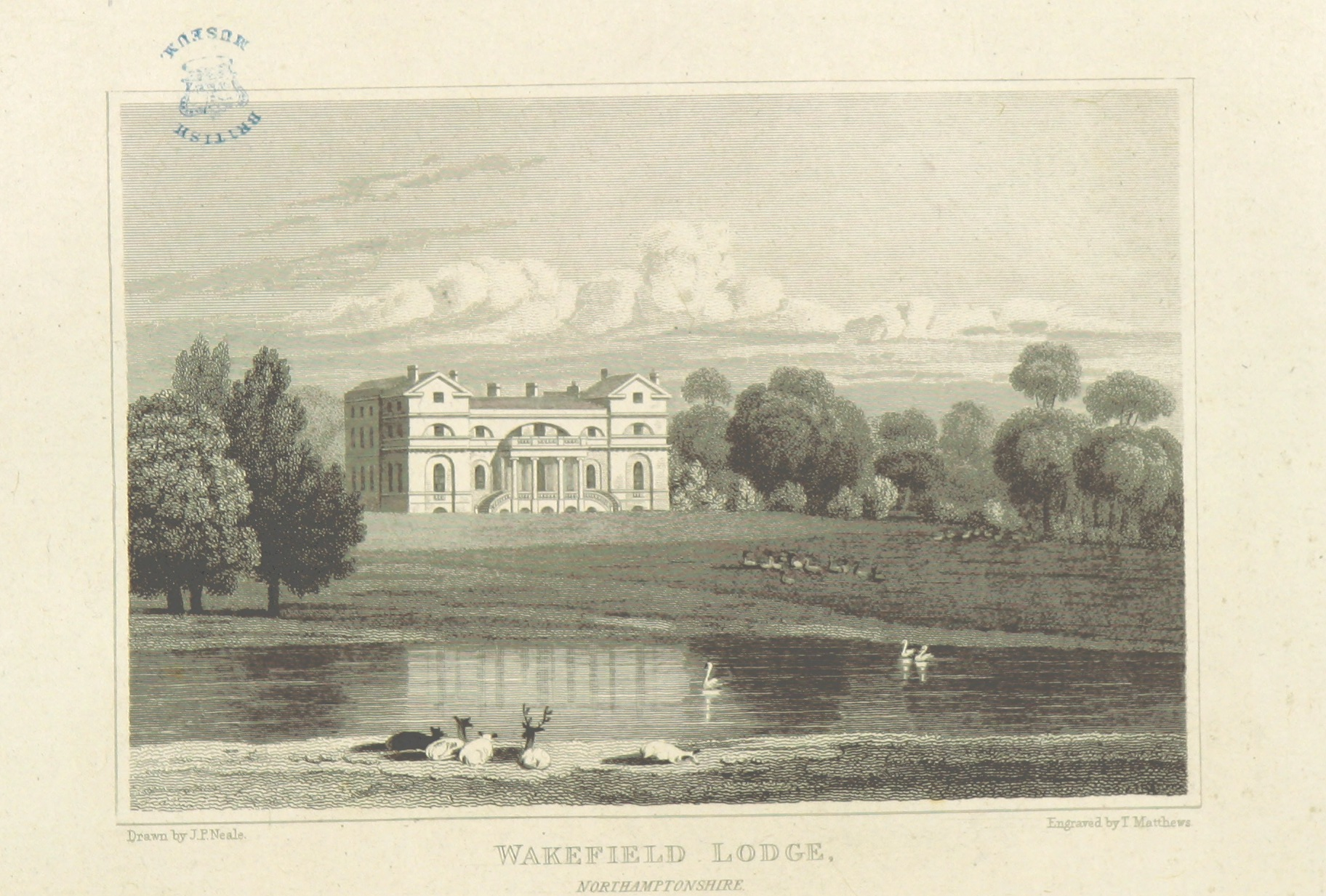
in 1818

Demolished in 1948 to leave only the wing designed by William Kent who died two hundred years before, a modern free source image of the house and one the grounds:

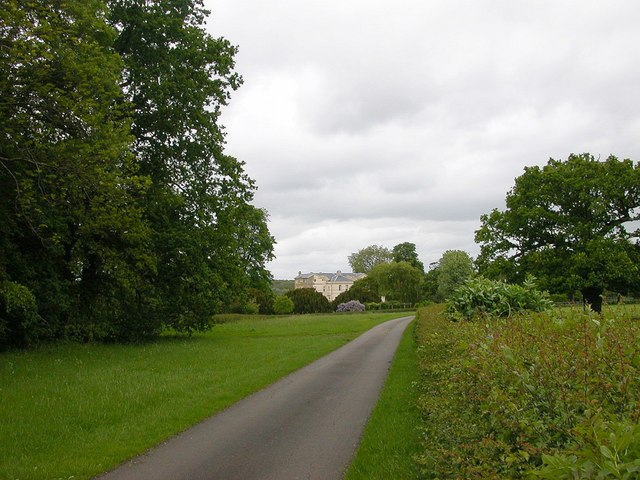
House in distance, what remains of an avenue of tall trees can be made out

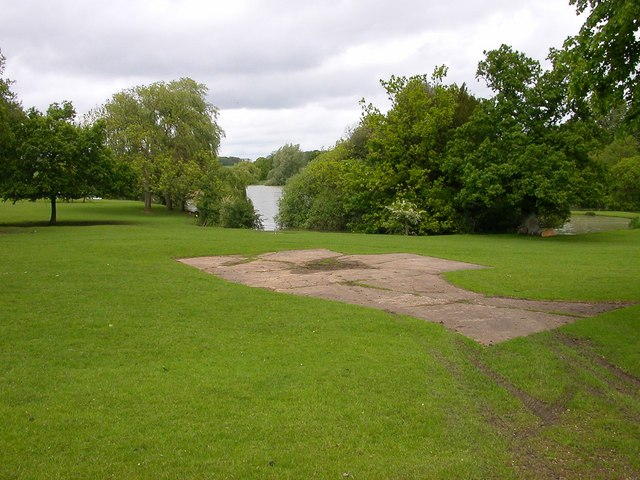
Grounds only
