= Whittlewood Forest =

Forest in the county of Northamptonshire in England

Coordinates: 52.081°N 0.949°W

- Site of Special Scientific Interest
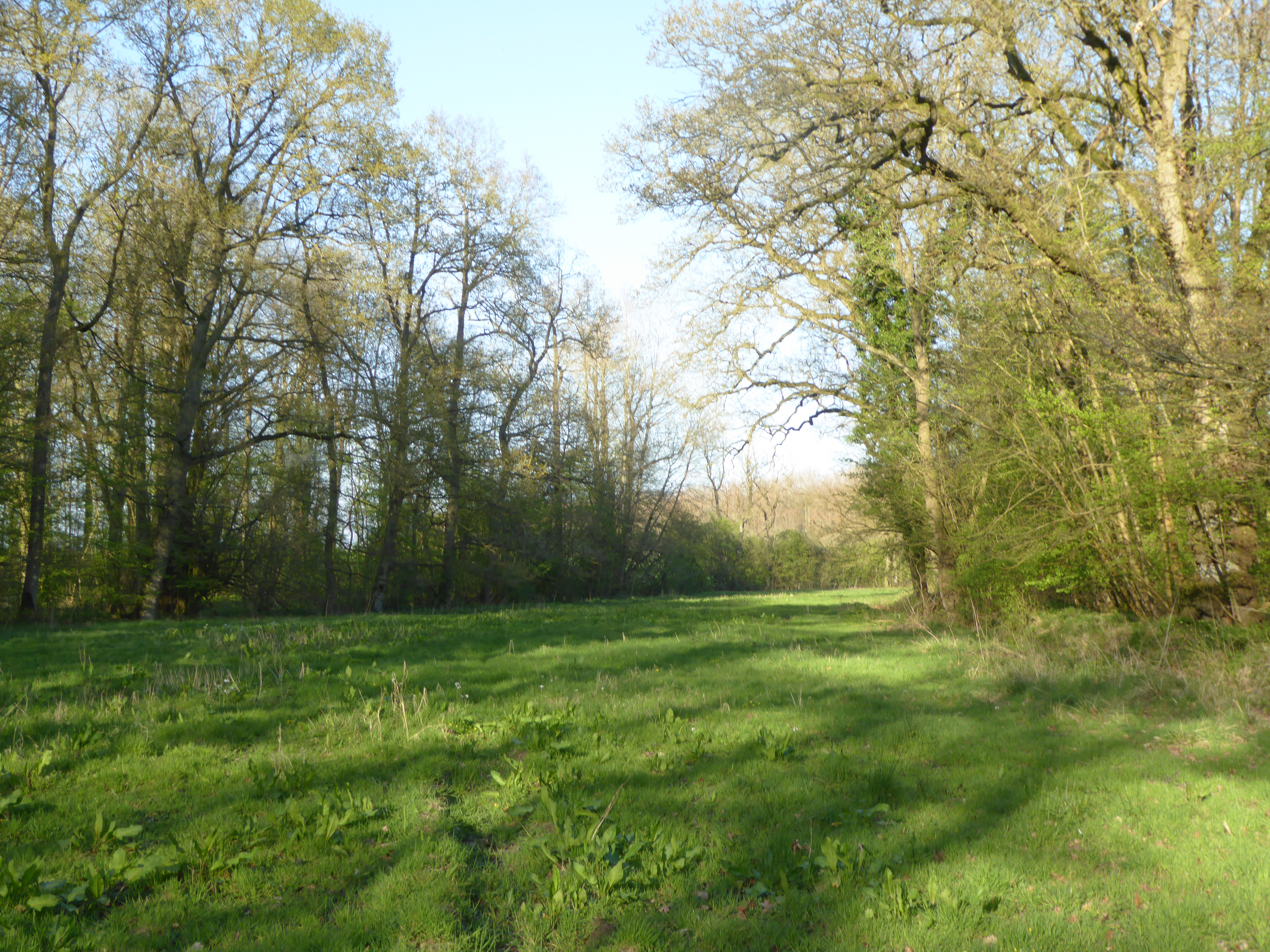
- Say's Copse
- Location of Whittlewood Forest.
- Area of search: Northamptonshire
- Grid reference: SP 721 430
- Interest: Biological
- Area: 400.1 hectares
- Notification date: 1985
- Location map: Magic Map

Whittlewood Forest is a former medieval hunting forest south of Towcester and east of Silverstone in Northamptonshire in England. It is managed by the Forestry England. There are tracts of ancient woodland within it and old ditches can be found at the edges of several individual woods. The area has been the subject of extensive academic historical research. An area of 400 hectares (990 acres) in seven different patches has been designated a biological Site of Special Scientific Interest (SSSI), which is about half the size of an average English parish. It is a Nature Conservation Review site, Grade 2.

== Extent ==
The forest is mainly between the villages of Silverstone, Syresham, Abthorpe, Wicken, Potterspury and to the high Buckinghamshire boundary. Interconnecting woods, made up in part by Hazelborough Wood, make up the main section. Isolated woods such as Bucknell Wood and a scattered set east of the village of Whittlebury, as far as Potterspury make up most of the rest. Remnants exist all around the villages and over the county boundary into Buckinghamshire and Milton Keynes; such outliers include Whistley Wood, west of Syresham.

== Management ==
It is managed by the Forestry Commission, who also manage neighbouring woods such as Salcey Forest and Yardley Chase. Parts of the wood are protected as an SSSI, especially a number of separate copses which represent the remnants of the old semi-Royal Forest in the Honour of Grafton.

== Ecology ==
It is notable for bluebells in mid-Spring in many parts of the forest together with other ancient woodland indicator species such as Yellow rattle and the Lesser celandine. There are stands of beech and oak interspersed with hazel coppice as well as conifer plantations within the forest. The conifer plantations are slowly being removed as a part of a national policy to restore ancient woodland. They will be replaced with native hardwoods such as oak and beech. As with most ancient woods, coppicing is no longer practised, and many former coppice stools can be seen in the woods.

Three types of deer are in the forest: red, roe and muntjac. Foxes and badgers are common. Birds include buzzards and there are occasional sightings of the red kite, possibly from the expanding population in the Chilterns.

The SSSI is ancient semi-natural woodlands with many trees which are mature or over-mature, especially pedunculate oaks. There are also many ash trees and a scattering of silver birches and aspens. The oaks have nationally rare and nationally uncommon beetles, and there are locally rare lichens.

== Access ==
Some areas are open to the public, and footpaths go through others such as Say's Copse, but some are private land.

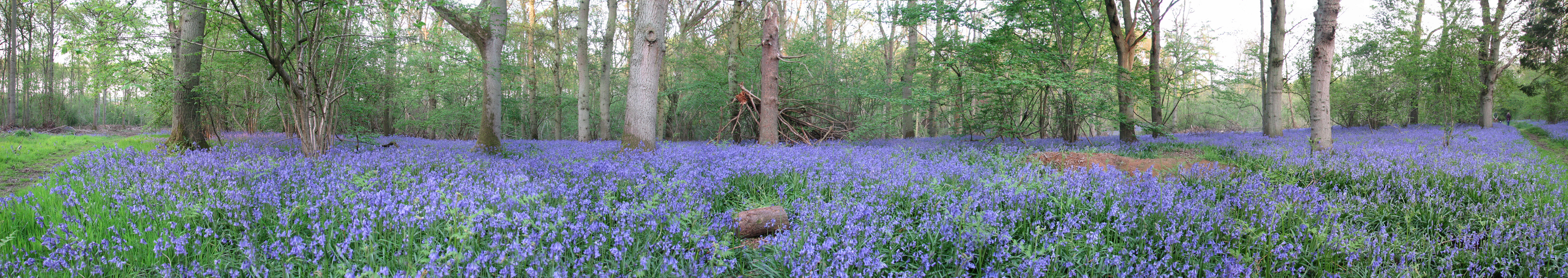
A Panoramic view of bluebells in the north-east of Bucknell Wood

== See also ==
- Ancient woodland
- Salcey Forest
- Yardley chase
