= Yardley Chase =

Protected area in England

Coordinates: 52.194°N 0.770°W

- Site of Special Scientific Interest
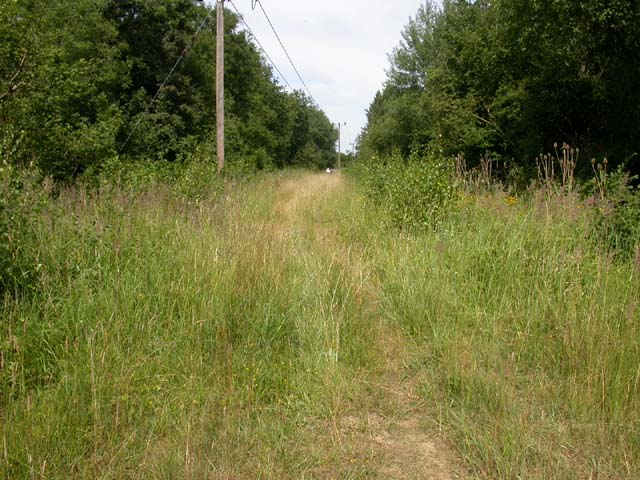
- Barnstaple Wood
- Location of Yardley Chase.
- Area of search: Northamptonshire; Buckinghamshire
- Grid reference: SP 846 543
- Interest: Biological
- Area: 357.6 hectares
- Notification date: 1984
- Location map: Magic Map

Yardley Chase is a 357.6-hectare (884-acre) biological Site of Special Scientific Interest, mostly in Northamptonshire, with a small area in the south of the site in Buckinghamshire. It is in two areas of woodland, pasture and parkland, south-west of Yardley Hastings in Northamptonshire, and north-west of Olney in Buckinghamshire.

== Ecology ==
This Chase has diverse semi-natural habitats, and its value for invertebrates has been enhanced by military use of the site, which has resulted in a long absence of intensive agriculture. There is woodland and unimproved grassland, and 30 breeding butterfly species have been recorded.

== History ==
Much of the site was originally a Norman Hunting Chase and is now woodland, pasture and parkland. More recently, military use over a large part has left a series of railway tracks, grassland glades and open pools in the forest. The value of these habitats, particularly for invertebrates, is enhanced by their long isolation from intensive agriculture and by their presence over a large area.

There is documentary evidence in the form of early maps and estate plans to indicate a long history of woodland on the site, although much of the former ancient semi-natural woodland has been replanted or modified. This has created a range of woodland types including plantations of oak, mixed broad-leaves such as ash and conifers. The integrity of the woodland blocks as a whole is essential to their nature conservation importance, but the relatively unmodified areas are of particular significance.

In addition to the ancient trees dating back to the civil war, Yardley Chase was also home to the oak tree which provided the inspiration for William Cowper's poem "Yardley Oak" and the area is described as having been a favourite walk of Cowper's.

== Military use ==
Yardley Chase contains some large concrete huts, about 12 metres (39 ft) long, and about 6-8m (20–25 feet) wide, which were used during World War II to store bombs. They continued in use after the war as a bulk explosives depot, until the 1970s when the Ministry of Defence shut them down when it became obvious that they would be useless in a nuclear war. The site was served by a branch of the Northampton-Bedford railway line and evidence of revetted tracks are still visible around the site which is only a few miles east of the former depot of the Northamptonshire Regiment and later Royal Pioneer Corps at Simpson Barracks in Wootton. The site also has numerous small bunkers within it and is criss-crossed by barbed wire fences once past the main perimeter. It has several tracks that lead to the various bunkers and fair amounts of military debris (mainly used pyrotechnics) scattered around it.

The eastern munitions site is larger than its western neighbour and the bomb storage buildings, in addition to being less numerous, are also mostly surrounded by water-filled moats. The storage buildings at the western site are surrounded by earth banks. The eastern and western sites were connected by a rail track.

The site is nowadays used by Army, Navy and Air cadets, as well as the Territorial Army units for basic skills training and field-craft. This site is closed to the public. The ACF use the training area on a regular basis – along with CCF units from nearby Schools. Naval cadets from TS Invincible (Bletchley Park) also use the site for on-shore field-craft. It is also used by the air cadets from Wellingborough and Rushden for fieldcraft weekends.

A ceremony for the new Yardley Chase Cadet Training Centre, on Denton Road, Horton, Northamptonshire, took place at Yardley Chase on 11 July 2013 to mark the commencement of construction work on a new £7.2 million Cadet Training Centre. It replaced a number of former Second World War buildings in poor condition, that had been used by Army Cadets for many years. The new centre can be used by up to 180 Cadets and 45 adult volunteers and on 25 October 2014, eighty guests and over 100 young people and adult volunteers from the Combined Cadet Force, Sea Cadets, Army Cadet Force (ACF) and Air Training Corps were present at the opening of the centre by Major General Robert Nitsch CBE, General Officer Commanding Support Command.

The new training facility is set to be used primarily by Leicestershire, Northamptonshire and Rutland Army Cadet Force (LNR ACF) although other Cadet and youth organisations, community-based projects and local businesses will be able to hire the facility.

The official opening event included guests having the opportunity to see and get involved with a variety of Cadet-based activities both inside and outside the new training centre, as well as having a chance to view the new accommodation area.

== Access ==
There are footpaths through the Chase but some areas used by the military are closed to the public.

== See also ==
- Salcey Forest
- Whittlewood Forest
