= Whittlebury =

Village in Northamptonshire, England

Coordinates: 52.0855°N 0.9871°W

- Location within Northamptonshire
- Population: 589 (2011)
- OS grid reference: SP6943
- Unitary authority: West Northamptonshire
- Ceremonial county: Northamptonshire
- Region: East Midlands
- Country: England
- Sovereign state: United Kingdom
- Post town: Towcester
- Postcode district: NN12
- Dialling code: 01327
- Police: Northamptonshire
- Fire: Northamptonshire
- Ambulance: East Midlands
- UK Parliament: Daventry

Whittlebury is a village and civil parish in the south of the English county of Northamptonshire, close to its border with Buckinghamshire.

== History ==
It is due south of the town of Towcester, to which it is connected by main roads. At the time of the 2001 census, the parish's population was 586 people, increasing slightly to 589 at the 2011 census.

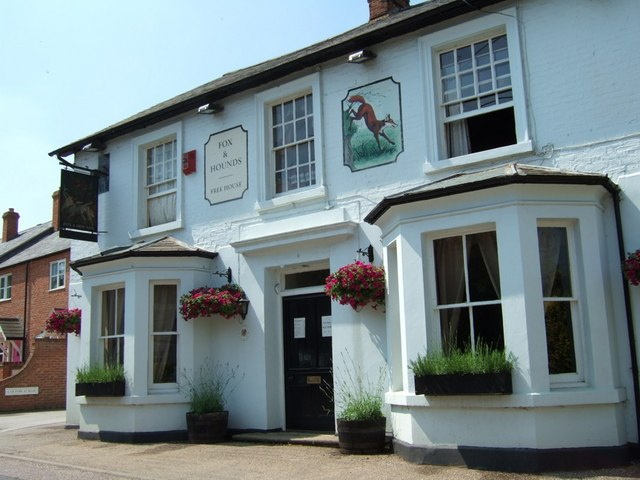
Pub in Whittlebury

The village's name means 'fortification of Witla'.

Little is known of Whittlebury's prehistoric past. However, in May 2000, an Iron Age hillfort was discovered in the vicinity of St Mary's church and churchyard. Archaeology also reveals evidence of Roman, Anglo-Saxon and medieval occupation of Whittlebury; the latter period documented in historical records.

Throughout the Middle Ages and up until the early 19th Century Whittlebury's development was interlinked with the Whittlewood Forest of which it was a part and the Honour of Grafton. In 1855, the 5th Duke of Grafton sold land in Whittlebury and Silverstone to the 3rd Baron Southampton who developed Whittlebury Lodge.

Whittlebury was very much a 'gentry village' and hunting was a significant activity. The village was associated with the Grafton Hunt, the Duke of Grafton having a seat at nearby Wakefield Lodge. Nearby Sholebroke Lodge was built as the residence of the Deputy Ranger of Whittlewood Forest.

In the 18th Century John Wesley was a regular visitor to Whittlebury, describing the village in 1781 as, "This is still the loveliest congregation as well as the liveliest society in the circuit."

=== Whittlebury Park ===
Whittlebury Park has a 213-bed hotel located next to a 36-hole England Golf Championship venue golf course, adjacent to Silverstone Circuit.

The hotel had been owned & operated by financial specialists Zolfo Cooper from 2011 after the business had been placed into administration. It was purchased in 2016 by the Sargeant family, owners of the golf course, combining the businesses into Whittlebury Park on the 300-acre site.
