= St Botolph's Church, Slapton =

Church of St Botolph, Slapton
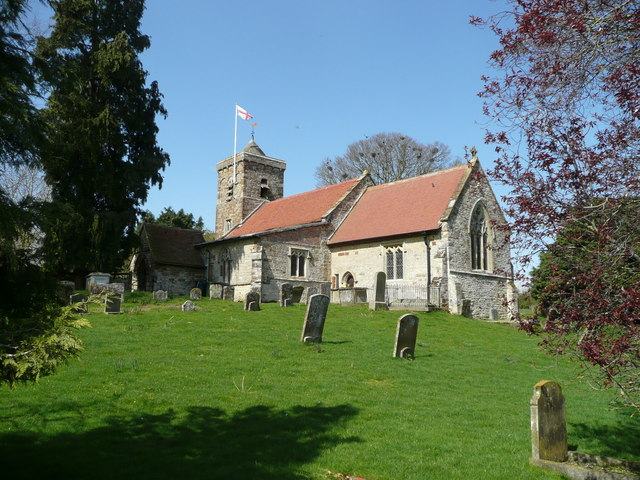
- View from the southeast

- Location within Northamptonshire
- 52°06′57.4″N 1°04′00.7″W
- Location: Slapton, Northamptonshire
- Country: England
- Denomination: Church of England
- Previous denomination: Catholic Church
- Website: https://www.whittlewoodparishes.org.uk/slapton/slapton.html

History
- Status: parish church
- Dedication: Saint Botolph
- Consecrated: 12th-13th cent

Architecture
- Heritage designation: Grade I Listed
- Style: English Gothic

Administration
- Diocese: Diocese of Peterborough
- Archdeaconry: Archdeaconry of Northampton
- Deanery: Towcester
- Benefice: Whittlewood
- Parish: Slapton

Clergy
- Vicar: Reverend Paul McLeod

The Church of St Botolph, Slapton, also referred to as Slapton, St Botolph, is the ancient parish church of the village of Slapton near Towcester in West Northamptonshire, United Kingdom. Constructed sometime around the late 12th and early 13th centuries the church is notable for its almost complete surviving set of late medieval wall paintings, widely considered the finest in Northamptonshire. The interior was described by Nikolaus Pevsner as "memorably intimate". The church is designated as a Grade I listed building.

== History ==
Constructed on an area of high ground at the north end of the modern village, the churches history is intertwined with that of the villagers and Slapton Manor, located immediately to the west of the church. Its construction would have been overseen by the Manor House, at that time owned by a branch of the De Lucy family who are commemorated by the inclusion of their family crest in the east window over the high altar. The Knight family, later keepers of the manor, are also commemorated widely in the churches monuments. It was initially built sometime in the late 12th to early 13th century and was added to in the 14th century. The wall paintings were an evolving work between the 14th and early 16th centuries and being situated in the naves, the area of the church associated with the laity, represent the religious preoccupations of the common people. The wall paintings were probably whitewashed at the time of all the others in the country during the Edwardian reformation. The church continued to act as the villages parish church under the new Protestant church structure and contains a variety of post reformation fixtures and fittings. The vicarage located to the north is 19th century. The tower was reconstructed in 1878–9. The wall paintings were uncovered in the 1950s-1970's and have made the building one of Northamptonshire's most significant medieval antiquarian sites.

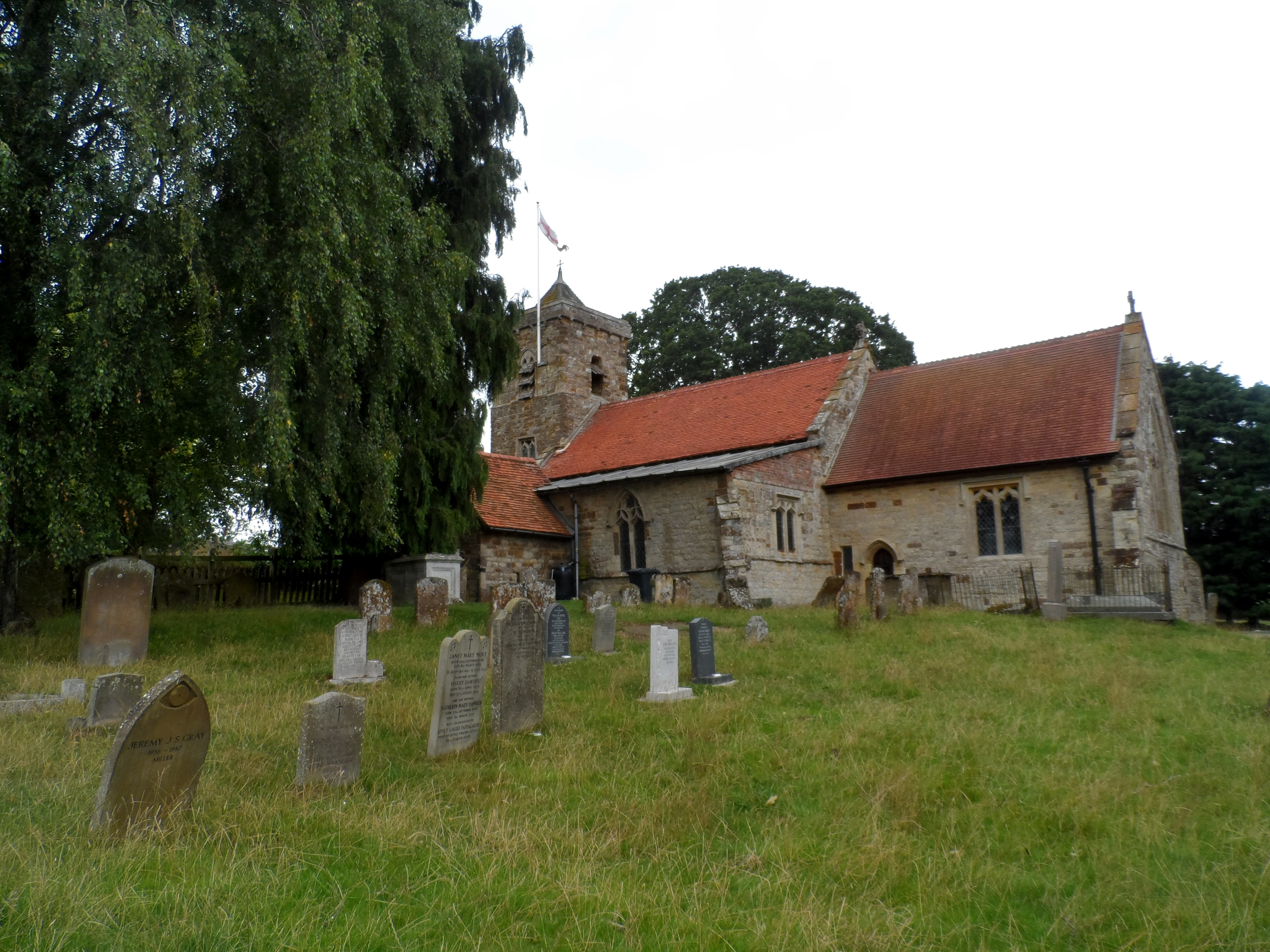
View of the church from the south showing chancel and south aisle.

== Structure ==
The building consists of a chancel, a nave, a southern lean to lady chapel, a west tower, and a south porch. Like the vast majority of medieval churches, it is oriented axially towards the sanctuary and the high altar in the chancel at the east end of the church. It is constructed from local limestone and ironstone, a characteristically Northamptonshire material.

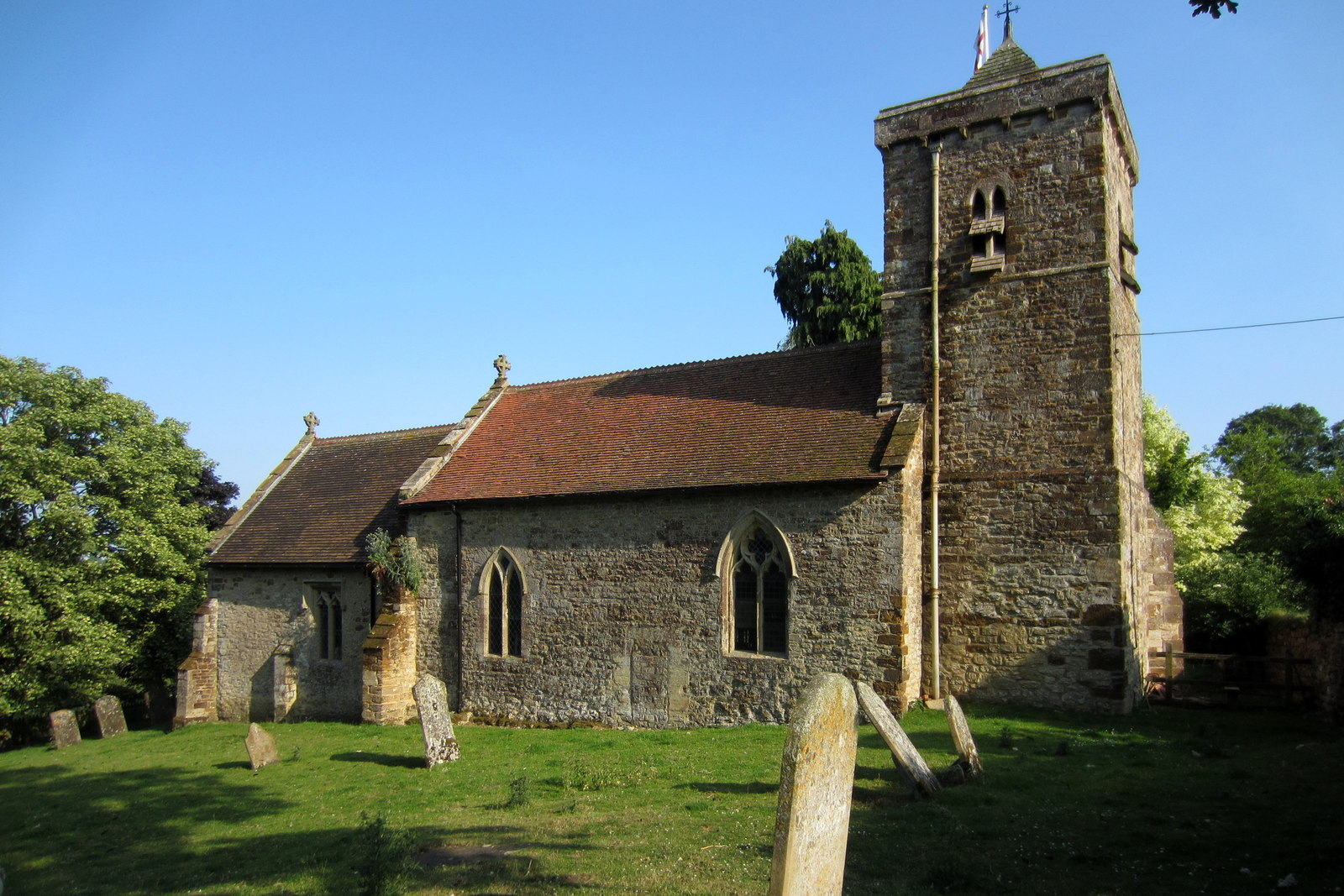
North elevation of the church showing nave and chancel.

On the south wall of the main body are two traceried gothic windows and a porch, inside which there are a couple of carved Mass dials. On the north elevation, the nave and chancel, there are also two windows and a walled up door. The chancel is lit by three large gothic windows and has a small priests door to the south.

== Interior ==
The two naves, the principal nave in the north aisle and the lady chapel in the south aisle, are divided by an arcade of 3 bays. The chancel is divided from the north aisle by a solid stone rood screen wall punctured by a central door and two traceries windows. The south aisle has a small piscina at the east end of the south wall where the lady altar would have been prior to the reformation. The chancel has a number of niches in the wall one of which was probably the Easter Sepulchre.

== The Slapton Wall Paintings ==
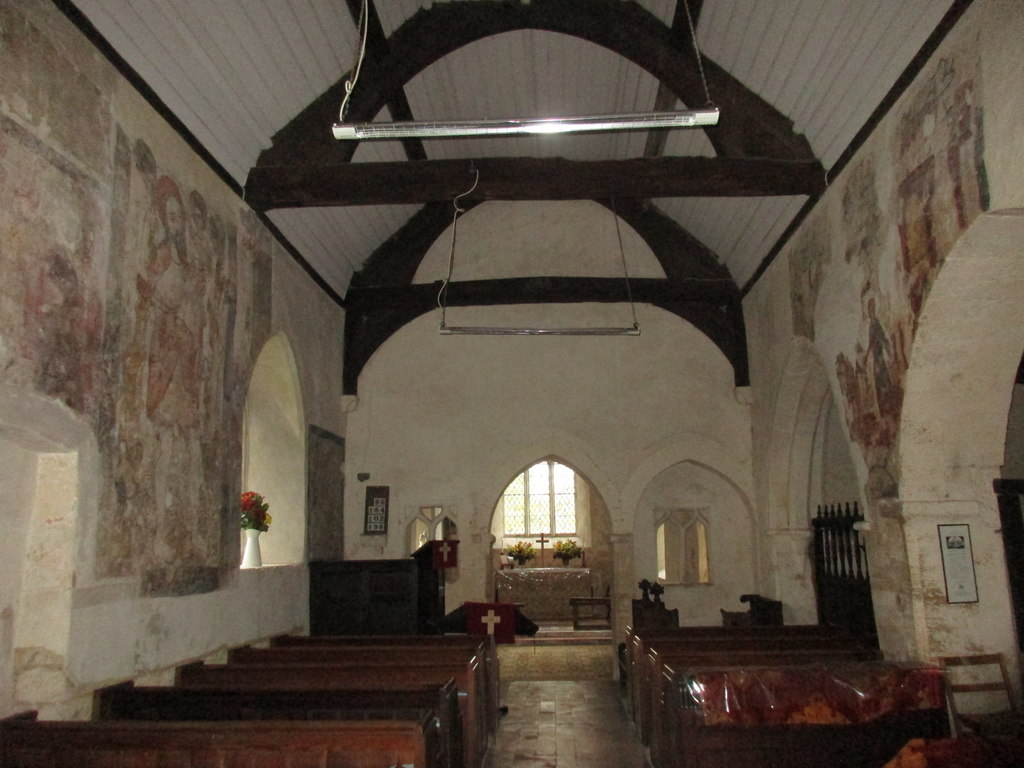
The nave looking east showing the Rood Screen wall and the entrances to the chancel. To the right is the screened off Lady Chapel in the south aisle.

The Church of St Botolph, Slapton is home to The Slapton Wall Paintings, a notably complete collection of 14th-15th century wall paintings which dominate the interior and greet the visitor immediately on entry. In the north aisle on the north wall a large depiction of St Christopher carrying the Child Jesus and over the capitals of the arcade to the south (from left to right) St George and the dragon (partly lost), the Virgin Mary and St Michael overseeing the Weighing of souls, Satan inspiring two gossips, The Ecstasy of St Francis, and the Mass of Saint Gregory showing the Man of Sorrows. In the south aisle along the south wall are images of Saint Eligius the blacksmith with the Virgin Mary and St Anne, and the Three Living and the Three Dead (a Danse Macabre) to the right of the south door; above the capitals in the south aisle are scenes of the Suicide of Judas Iscariot and the Annunciation of the Virgin

The Slapton Wall Paintings
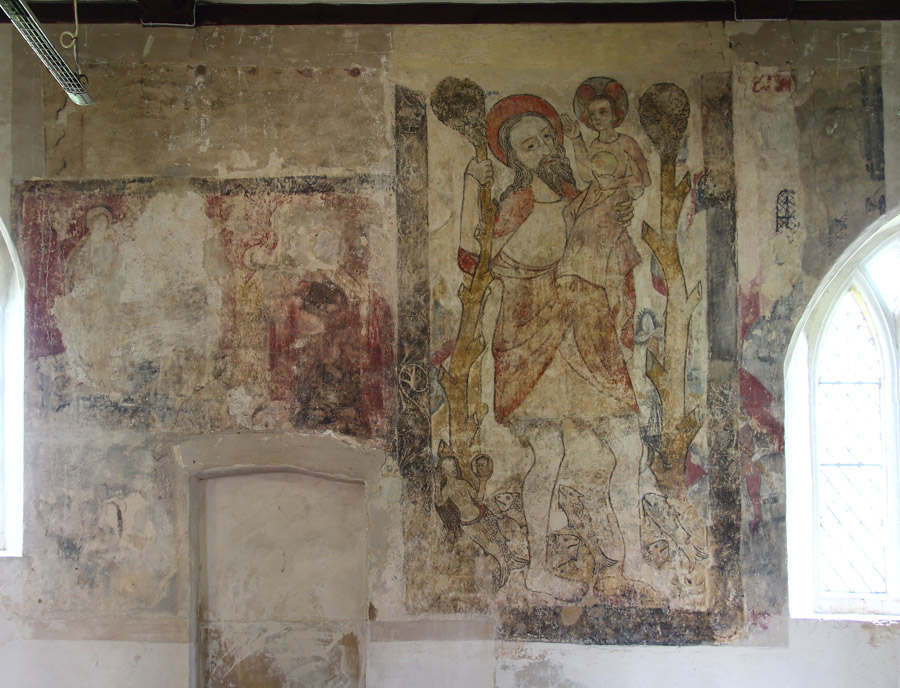
Saint Christopher carrying the Child Jesus

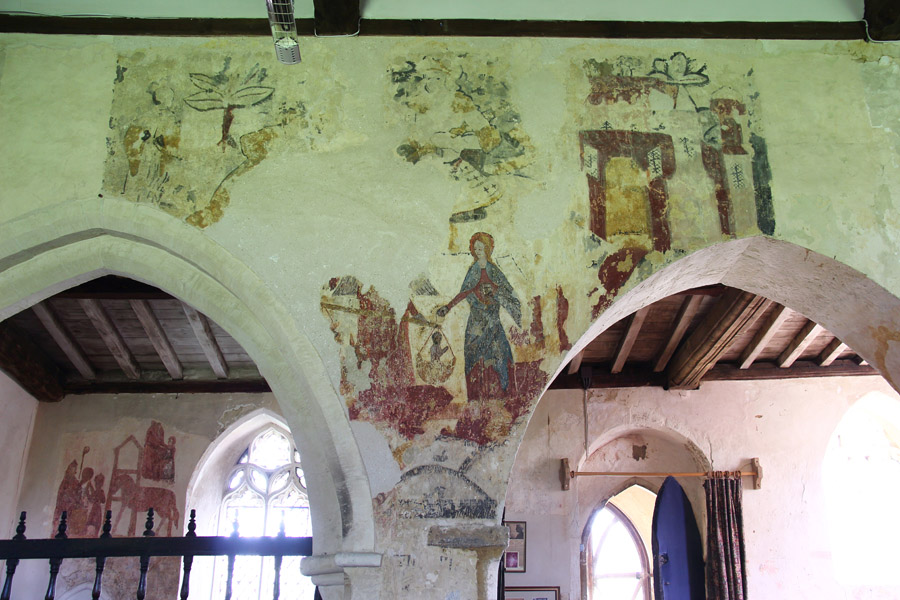
Saint George and the dragon above and Our Lady and the Archangel Michael overseeing the Weighing of souls

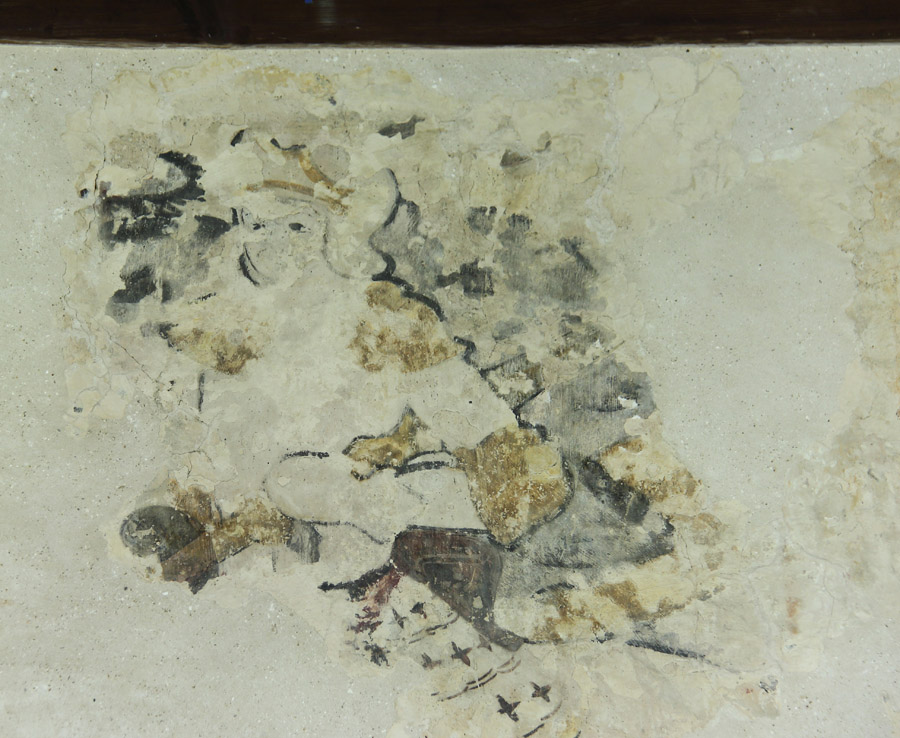
Closeup of Saint George

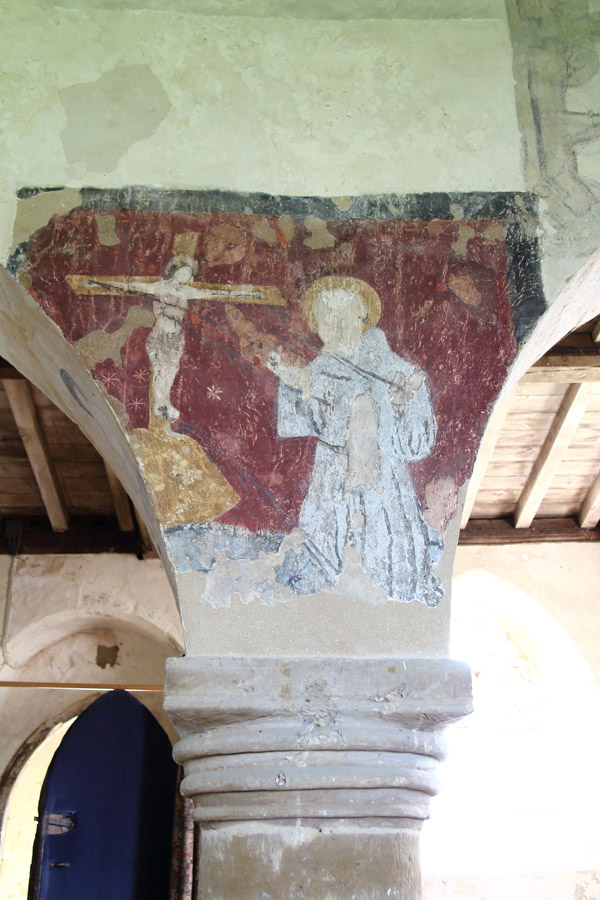
The Ecstasy of St Francis

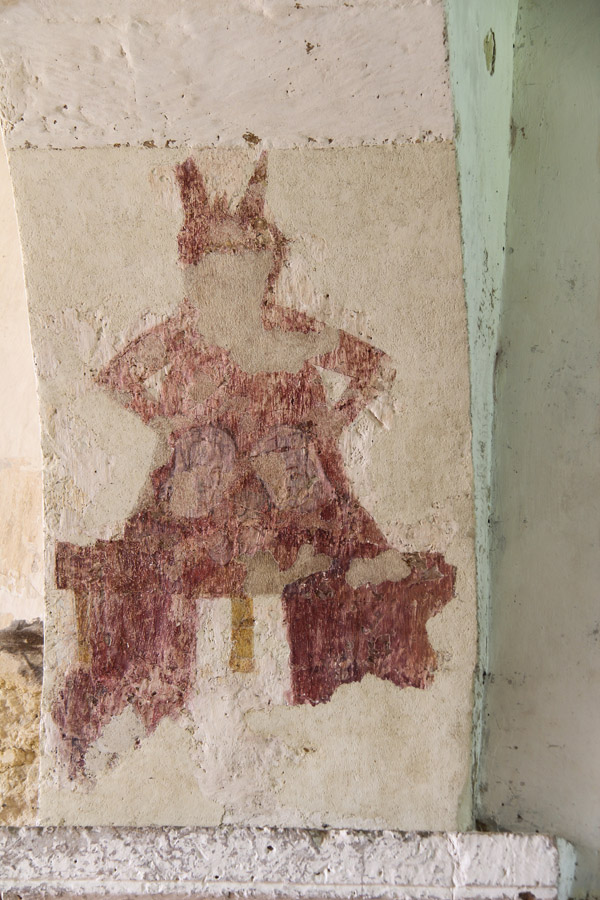
Satan tempting two gossips

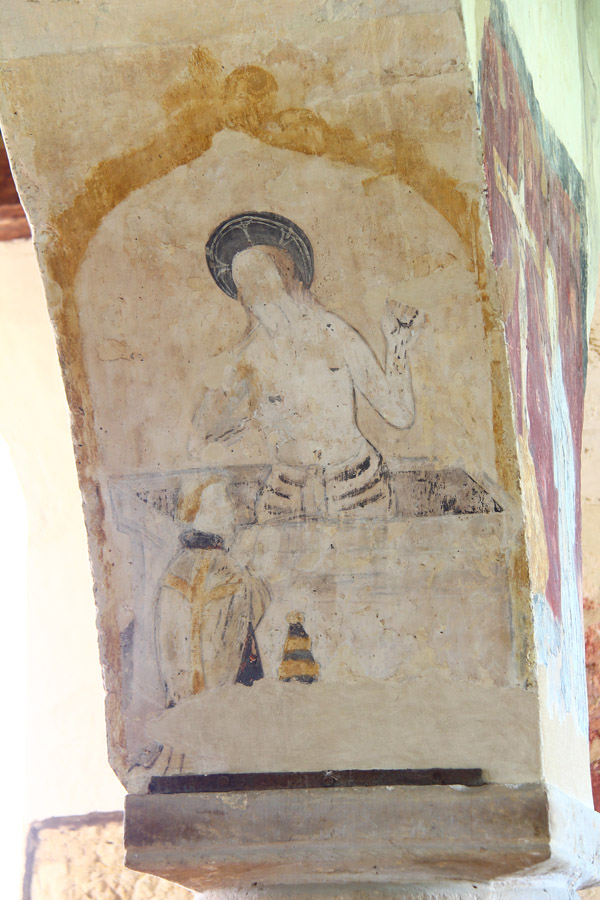
Mass of Saint Gregory showing the Man of Sorrows

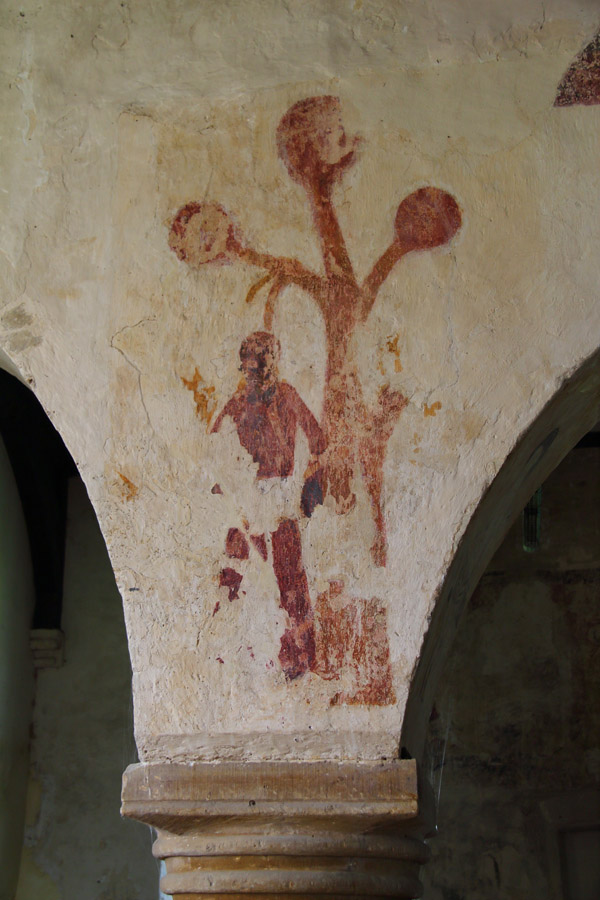
Suicide of Judas Iscariot

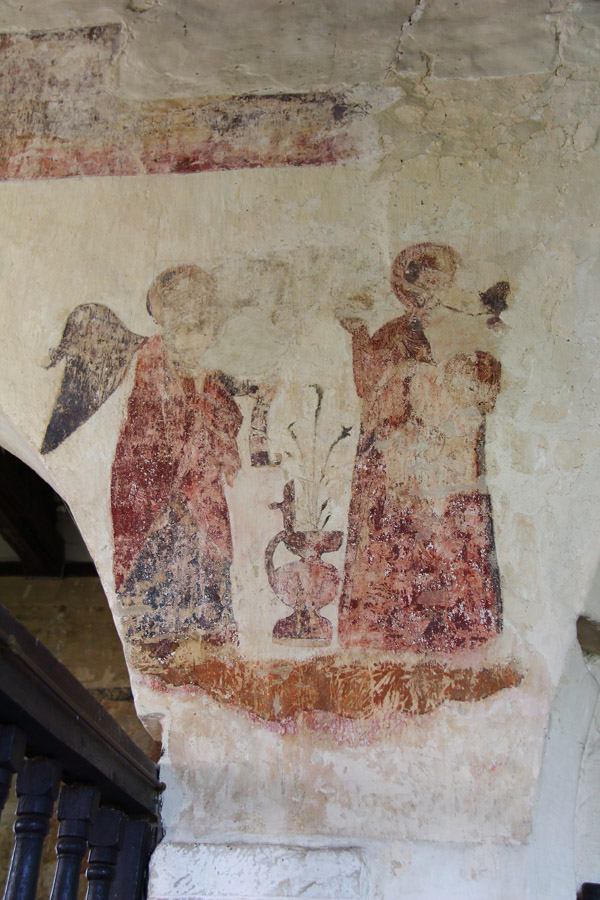
The Annunciation

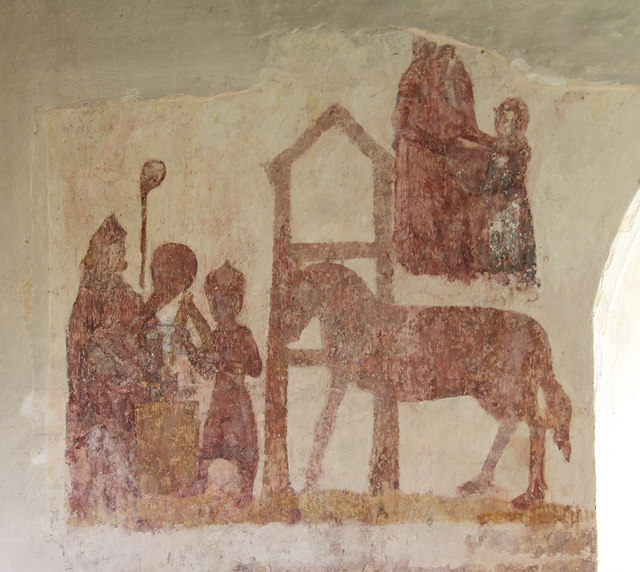
Saint Eligius the blacksmith and in the top right St Anne, mother of the Virgin Mary, holding her daughter on her knee

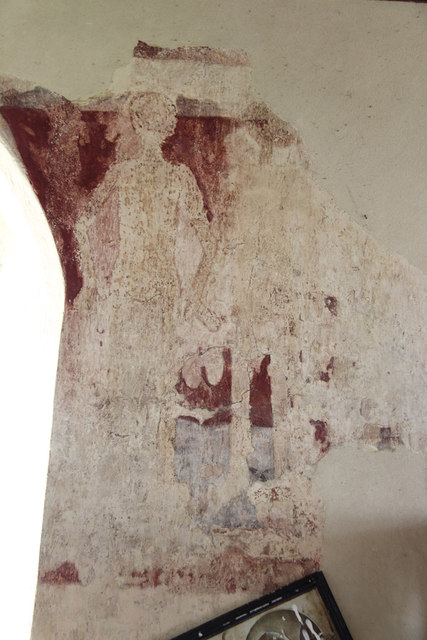
The Three Living and the Three Dead (a Danse Macabre)

== See also ==
- Grade I listed buildings in Northamptonshire
- The Pickering Wall Paintings
- The Raunds Wall Paintings
