= Edward Grubb of Birmingham =

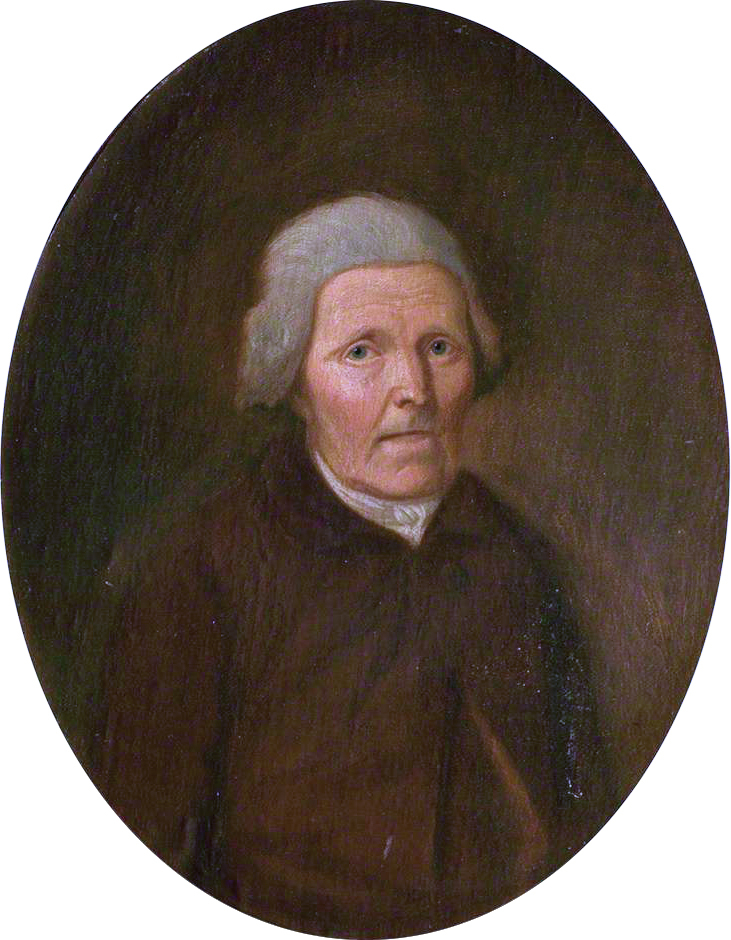
Self portrait (1790s)

Edward Grubb of Birmingham (1740–1816) was an English stonemason, sculptor and artist, the first unambiguously fine art sculptor to work in Birmingham.

Probably born in Towcester in 1740, he moved with his brother Samuel – also a stonemason – first to Stratford-upon-Avon and then by 1769 to Birmingham. Here he produced several monuments in local churches, and in 1770 the first non-ecclesiastic public sculpture in the town: a statue of a boy and girl in uniform over the entrance to the Blue Coat School. They were reportedly modelled on actual pupils at the school. In 1881 the figures were painted. Copies were made in artificial stone by William Bloye in 1930, for display at the school's new location, to which it moved in the same year.

In later life, Grubb returned to Stratford-upon-Avon where he died in 1816.
