= Slapton, Northamptonshire =

Village in Northamptonshire, England

Coordinates: 52.1159°N 1.0662°W

Slapton
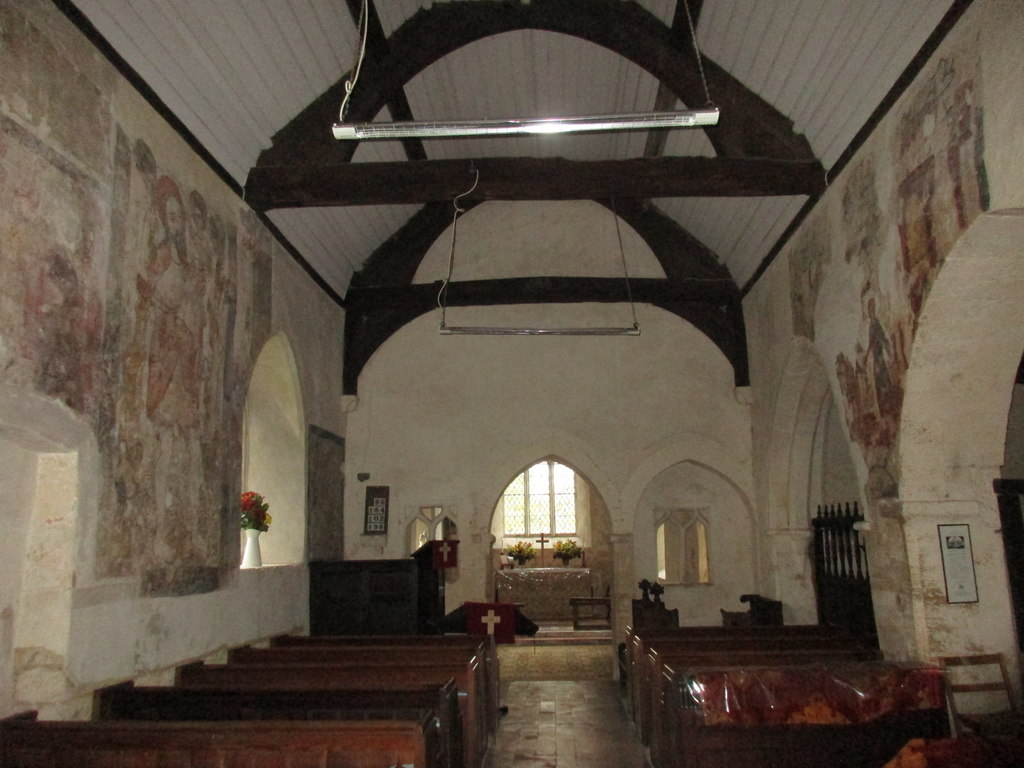
- The Slapton Wall Paintings

- Location within Northamptonshire
- Population: 92
- OS grid reference: SP640468
  - London: 69 miles (111.0 km)
- Unitary authority: West Northamptonshire
- Ceremonial county: Northamptonshire
- Region: East Midlands
- Country: England
- Sovereign state: United Kingdom
- Post town: Towcester
- Postcode district: NN12
- Dialling code: 01327
- Police: Northamptonshire
- Fire: Northamptonshire
- Ambulance: East Midlands
- UK Parliament: South Northamptonshire

Slapton is a small village in West Northamptonshire, England, about 4 miles (6.4 km) from Towcester and the same from Silverstone. It is close to the A43 road which links the M40 motorway junction 10 with the M1 junction 15A at Northampton. Central London is about 60 miles south of M40 junction 10. At the 2011 Census the population remained less than 100 and was included in the civil parish of Whilton. The village is the home of The Slapton Wall Paintings, an extraordinary and rare set of surviving 14th and 15th century wall paintings in the parish church.

The village's name means 'farm/settlement which is slippery' or 'farm/settlement which is muddy'.

== Governance ==
Slapton is represented on Woodend Parish Council. Prior to local government changes in 2021 it formed part of the Blakesley & Cote ward of South Northants District Council. The village was in the area of Northamptonshire County Council. It has since been taken into the united authority of West Northamptonshire

The current Parliamentary Constituency is Daventry. However, for the 2010 General Election there are boundary changes. The Boundary Commission originally retained the parish in the revised Daventry constituency, but after consultation with local residents the village was moved into the new South Northamptonshire constituency. Both Daventry and South Northamptonshire constituencies are considered safe Conservative seats.

== Landmarks ==
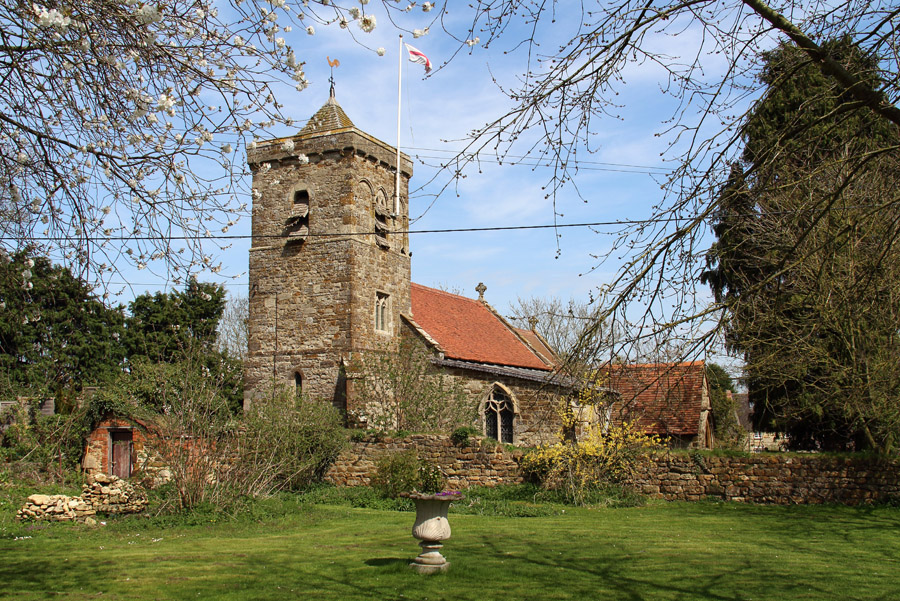
The west tower of St Botolph's Church viewed from the gardens of Slapton Manor House

The parish church is dedicated to Botolph of Thorney and dates from the early to mid-13th century. It is home to the notable Slapton Wall Paintings, a collection of late medieval folk art dating to the 14th and 15th centuries, restored in 1971. The church was described by Nikolaus Pevsner as "memorably intimate".

There is a Methodist chapel dated 1844.

On the road from Bradden there are three houses of c.1600 and another of 1775.
