= Towcester Town Hall =

Municipal building in Towcester, Northamptonshire, England

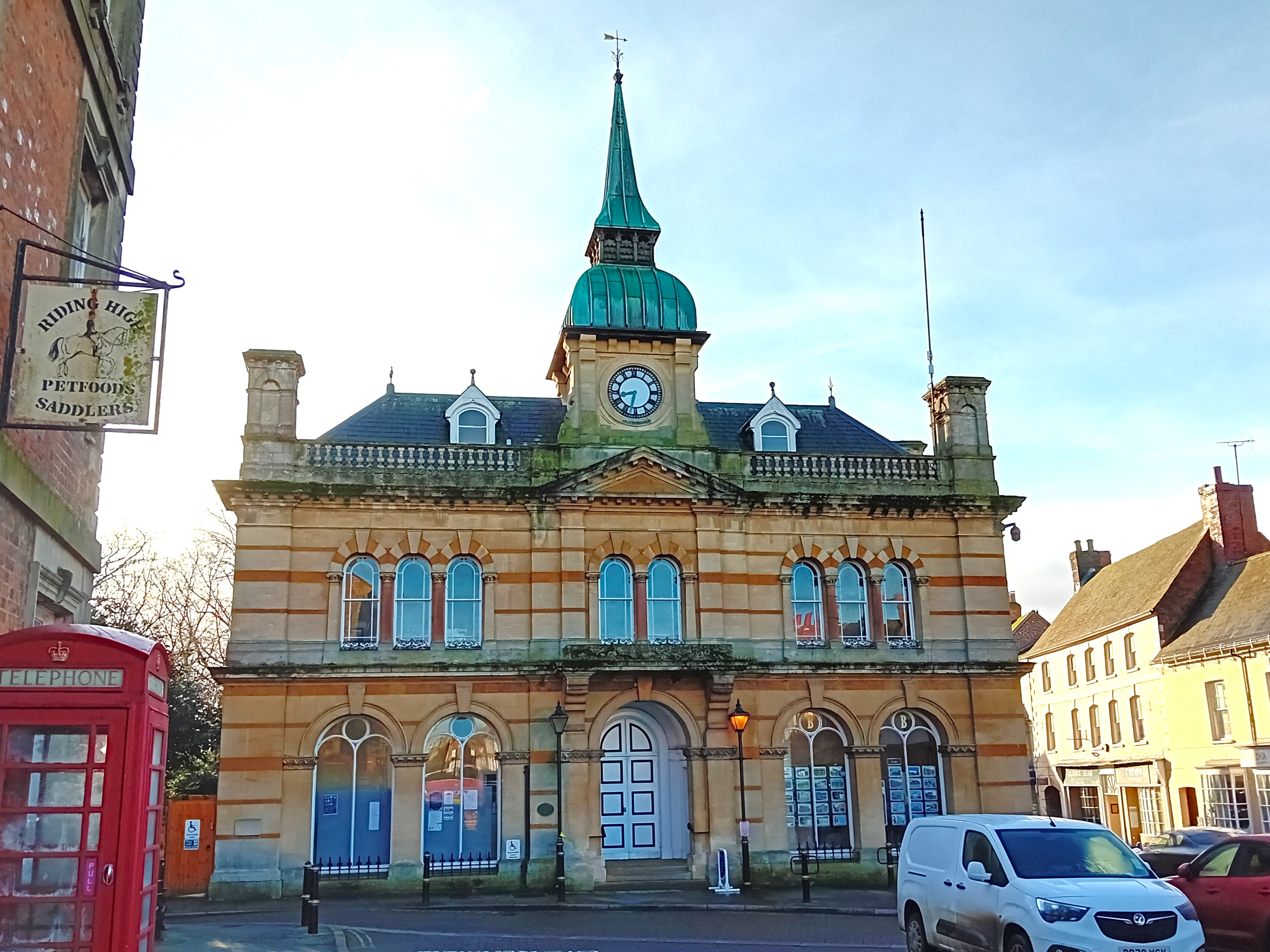
- Towcester Town Hall

- Shown in Northamptonshire
- 52.1319°N 0.9882°W
- Location: Watling Street, Towcester

History
- Built: 1866

Site notes
- Architect: Thomas Heygate Vernon
- Architectural style: Italianate style

Listed Building – Grade II
- Official name: Town Hall
- Designated: 19 August 1976
- Reference no.: 1371643

Towcester Town Hall is a municipal building in Watling Street, Towcester, Northamptonshire, England. The town hall, which is the meeting place of Towcester Town Council, is a grade II listed building.

== History ==
After significant population growth during the early 19th century associated with the town's role as a coaching stop on Watling Street, a turnpike road which had been paved by the engineer, Thomas Telford, local businessmen decided to form a company to develop a town hall and corn exchange: the site chosen was a prominent location in the market place which clearly defined its southern boundary.

The foundation stone for the building was laid by the Earl of Pomfret, who lived at Easton Neston house, on 8 September 1865. It was designed by Thomas Heygate Vernon in the Italianate style, built by John Wheeler with ashlar masonry and was completed in 1866. It was constructed using Bath stone, with contrasting bands of Duston stone. The design involved a symmetrical main frontage with three bays facing onto Chantry Lane; the central bay, which slightly projected forward, featured a round headed doorway flanked by pilasters and brackets supporting a stone parapet; there were two small rounded headed sash windows separated by a colonette and flanked by pilasters on the first floor and a carved pediment above. The outer bays featured two large round headed sash windows separated by pilasters on the ground floor and three small rounded headed windows separated by colonettes on the first floor. The design was modified at a late stage to include a clock tower at roof level with a zinc-clad belfry, (the addition of a clock having been made possible through subscription donations from 'the ladies of Towcester and the neighbourhood'). The clock was made by Moore & Sons of Clerkenwell, but (as was not unusual at the time) appears to have been credited to a local clockmaker: Arthur Garrett of Towcester (whose name is visible just below the face of the clock). Internally, the principal room was the public hall; there was also a working men's reading room, a working men's coffee room and several offices, as well as a shop and a private residence.

On 29 March 1880, the clock tower and part of the surrounding roof were destroyed by a fire; following rebuilding a new clock and bell were provided by Gillett, Bland & Co.

The building remained privately owned until 1935 when it was bought by Towcester Rural District Council for £2,250 to use as their meeting place and offices; the council had previously met at the workhouse on Brackley Road and had its offices in various locations around the town. The building remained the local seat of government after the larger South Northamptonshire District Council replaced the rural district council in 1974.

South Northamptonshire District Council moved to a new building at the junction of Springfields and Brackley Road in 1983. The town hall then became the responsibility of Towcester Parish Council, which renamed itself Towcester Town Council in 1986. Although the committee room on the ground floor was leased out to estate agents, Bartram & Co. in January 2018, the public hall has continued to be used for concerts and community events.
