= River Tove =

River in Northamptonshire and Buckinghamshire, England

Tove
- The Tove at Mill Farm, near Ashton

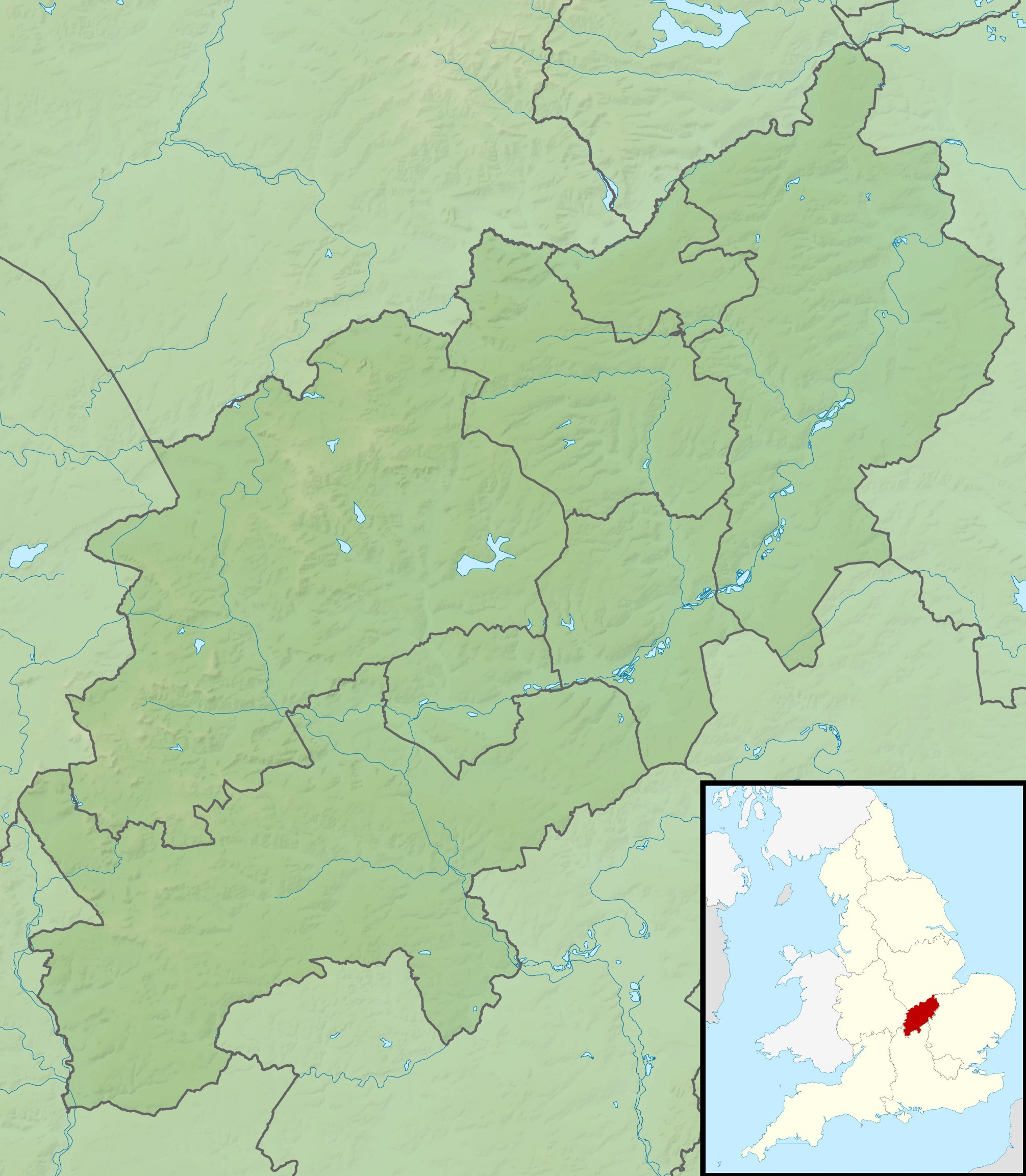
- Location of the mouth within Northamptonshire

Location
- Sovereign State: United Kingdom
- Country: England
- County: Northamptonshire

Physical characteristics
- Source
  - location: Greatworth, Northamptonshire
  - coordinates: 52.091560°N 1.1970709°W
  - elevation: 165 m (541 ft)
- Mouth: River Great Ouse
  - location: Cosgrove, Northamptonshire
  - coordinates: 52.071924°N 0.831661°W
  - elevation: 63 m (207 ft)
- Basin size: 216 km^{2} (83 sq mi)

Basin features
- River system: River Great Ouse

The River Tove is a river in England, a tributary of the River Great Ouse. Rising in Northamptonshire about a mile north of Greatworth, it flows for about 15 miles (24 km) north and east of the town of Towcester before meeting the Ouse south-east of Cosgrove, just north of Milton Keynes. Its final 5 miles (8 km) form part of the border between Northamptonshire and Buckinghamshire, running alongside the Grand Union Canal. The river ultimately flows into the North Sea.

The name comes from the Old English word *tof, meaning "laggard" or "dilatory", in reference to the river's winding course. The town of Towcester (Old English Tofeceaster, "Roman camp on the Tove") takes its name from the river.
