= Roade Cutting =

Railway cutting in Northamptonshire, England

Coordinates: 52.166°N 0.906°W

- Site of Special Scientific Interest
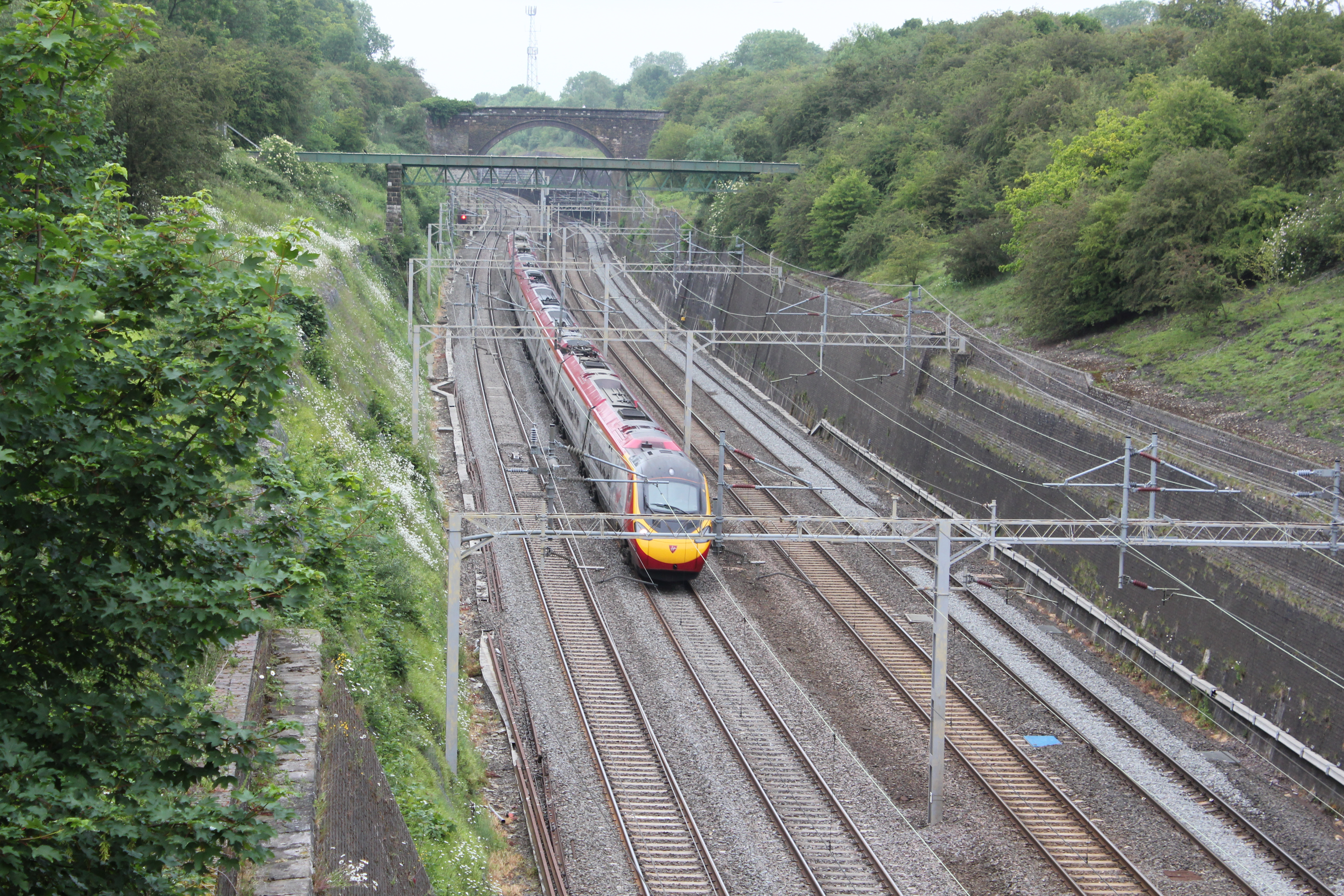
- Location of Roade Cutting.
- Area of search: Northamptonshire
- Grid reference: SP 749 525
- Interest: Geological
- Area: 15.2 hectares
- Notification date: 1986
- Location map: Magic Map

Roade Cutting, also known as Blisworth Cutting, is a railway earthwork and 15.2-hectare (38-acre) geological Site of Special Scientific Interest along the West Coast Main Line north from Roade in Northamptonshire, England. It is a Geological Conservation Review site.

== Geology ==
The cutting exposes rocks dating to the Middle Jurassic Bathonian stage, between 168.3 and 167.1 million years ago. It is described by Natural England as important for reconstructing the environment of deposition during the period, and correlating the White Limestone Formation in Oxfordshire and the East Midlands.

== Engineering ==
The cutting is 1.5 miles (2.4 kilometres) long and a maximum 65 feet (20 metres) deep. The ground proved to be an unstable combination of limestone, clay, and shale and the construction work suffered problems with water ingress. Large brick retaining walls were required to stabilise the cutting sides. The cutting is crossed by four tall brick bridges and an aqueduct, which was built to carry a small stream. The overbridges have all been rebuilt but the aqueduct, in cast iron and supported on stone piers, is original and is now a Grade II listed building.

== History ==
Contracts for construction were let in 1834 and the line through the cutting opened in 1838 as part of the London and Birmingham Railway (L&BR). It was designed by Robert Stephenson, the L&BR's chief engineer. Stephenson was determined to keep the ruling gradient on the line to 1:330, which necessitated major engineering works where the route encountered landscape features, including a previous cutting at Tring and a series of bridges and viaducts of which the largest, Wolverton Viaduct, is just south of Roade. Roade Cutting, sometimes known as Blisworth Cutting, was required to navigate the railway through a patch of high ground called Blisworth Hill.

The contractor for Roade was responsible for the section of line from just north of Wolverton Viaduct in the south to Blisworth in the north. The contractor underestimated the scale of the work and went bankrupt 18 months into the construction work, as happened with several of the contracts on the line. The railway company was forced to take the work in-house under Stephenson's supervision. Digging the cutting required the removal of 27 million cubic feet (765,000 cubic metres) of material, some of which was re-used on embankments elsewhere. The eventual cost of the project was over three times the figure for which the contract was let, largely due to the ground conditions, which had not been anticipated. Much of the rock was excavated by blasting—over 3,000 barrels of gunpowder were used—but the removal of the water required the installation of two steam pumps.

The railway initially bypassed Northampton, despite it being a large town, partly because reaching its location on the River Nene would require a steeper gradient than 1:330; Stephenson instead chose to take the line through Roade and Blisworth to Weedon Bec (via Stowe Hill Tunnel and Weedon Viaduct) and cross the Nene there. The cutting was originally double-tracked but was widened on its east side from 1881 to 1882 when the line was quadruple-tracked. The second pair of tracks diverges at the northern end of the cutting to serve Northampton via the Northampton loop line. This pair of lines is deeper than the original and another retaining wall was built between the two sets of tracks and an inverted arch was constructed underneath the deeper part of the cutting for additional stability. Ten years later, overhead iron girders were added to stabilise the retaining walls after a series of landslips.

== Bibliography ==
- Beckett, Derrick (1984). Stephensons' Britain. Newton Abbot: David & Charles. ISBN 9780715382691.
- Biddle, Gordon (2011). Britain's Historic Railway Buildings: A Gazetteer of Structures (second ed.). Hersham: Ian Allan. ISBN 9780711034914.
- Jenkinson, David (1988). The London & Birmingham: A Railway of Consequence. Ashford: Capital Transport Publishing. ISBN 9781854141026.
- Labrum, E. A. (1994). Civil Engineering Heritage: Eastern and Central England. London: Thomas Telford. ISBN 9780727719706.
