= Stowe Hill Tunnel =

Railway tunnel in Northamptonshire, England

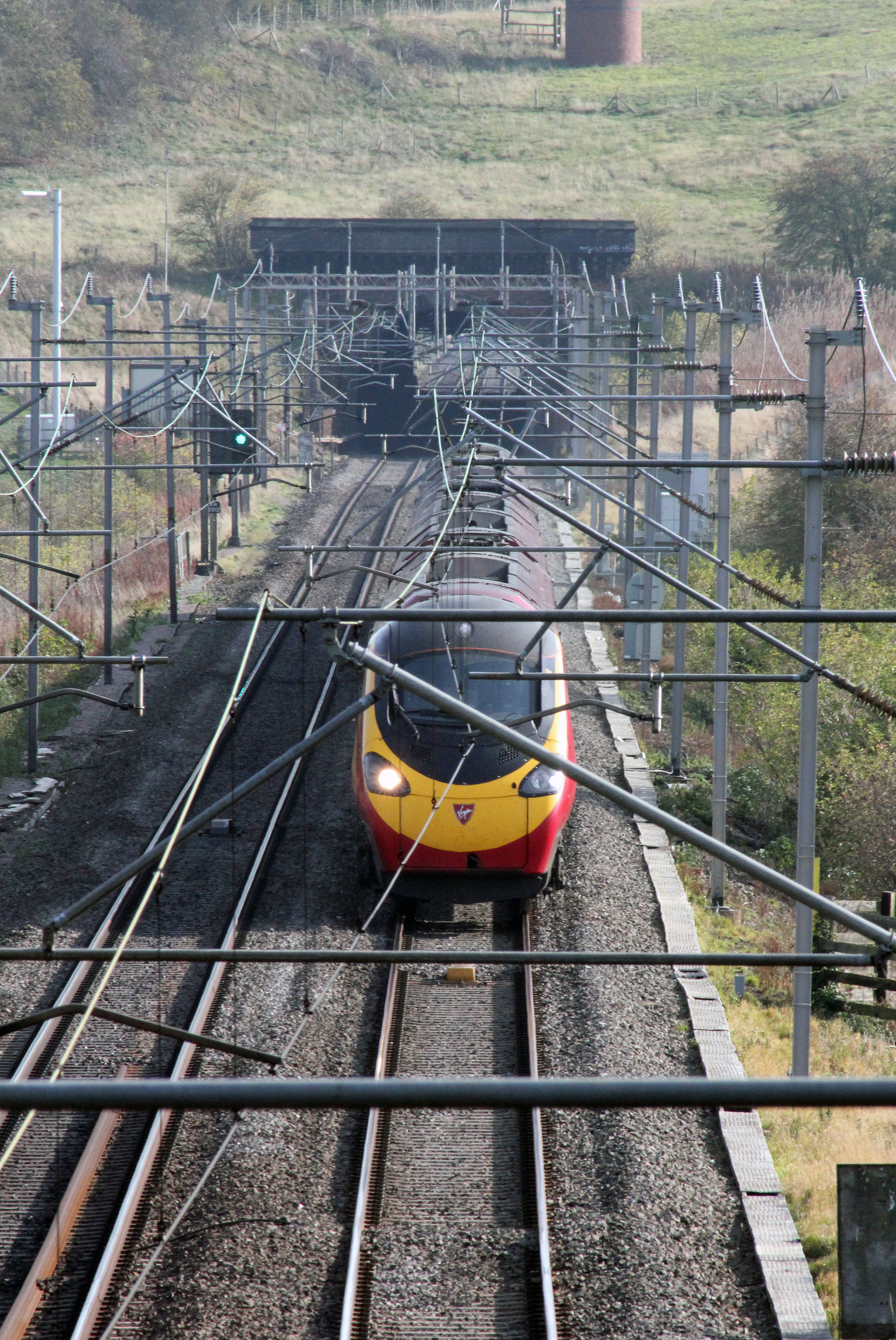
- Northbound train leaving the tunnel
- Interactive map of Stowe Hill Tunnel

Overview
- Line: West Coast Main Line
- Location: Weedon, Northamptonshire, England
- Coordinates: 52.219890°N 1.058386°W

Operation
- Opened: 1838
- Owner: Network Rail
- Character: railway tunnel

Technical
- Design engineer: Robert Stephenson
- Length: 520 yards (480 m)
- No. of tracks: 2

Stowe Hill Tunnel is a railway tunnel on the West Coast Main Line just south of the village of Weedon, Northamptonshire, England.

== Background ==
The tunnel was built as part of the London and Birmingham Railway and designed by its chief engineer, Robert Stephenson. Stephenson also surveyed the route. He took the line north-west from Roade Cutting, bypassing Northampton, partly because reaching it would require a gradient greater than the ruling 1:330 that Stephenson was determined to preserve. From Blisworth, at the north end of the cutting, the railway crosses the Blisworth Arch then follows much the same route as the Grand Union Canal, built a generation earlier. Stowe Hill is the sixth tunnel from London in the northbound direction.

== Description ==
The tunnel runs in a straight line underneath the A5 main road between Weedon and Towcester from about northwest to southeast. The tunnel has a single bore with twin tracks and is 520 yards (480 metres) long. The next station southbound is Wolverton and northbound Rugby. It has red brick portals, of which that at the north end is more elaborately decorated. It has a heavy three-tiered cornice, brick parapets with stone copings, and stone voussoirs around the mouths. It has large, splayed abutments which meet brick wing walls, parallel to the tracks, and terminate in hexagonal pillars with square stone caps. The south portal has brick voussoirs, straight abutments. It has a plainer cornice and parapet and straight abutments which meet curved wing walls.

== History ==
This section of line is largely as-built; south of Roade, the line has been heavily modified to accommodate a second pair of tracks but between there and Rugby the Northampton loop (built to serve Northampton in the 1870s) acts as a continuation of the second pair so no rebuilding was necessary on the original line. Overhead wires were added for electrification in the late 1950s. A short distance beyond the tunnel, the line crosses Weedon Viaduct.

During the 2000s, in preparation for the introduction of the British Rail Class 390 tilting trains, which would enable regular operating speeds of 125 miles per hour (201 kilometres per hour) along this section of the line, it was determined that the Stowe Hill tunnel would, without modification, cause such pressure changes to trains traversing it at high speed as to exceed passenger comfort levels. Accordingly, modifications to the tunnel were made in the form of four vertical pressure relief shafts being installed to provide sufficient mitigation; additional land around these new shafts was acquired, in some cases using compulsory purchase orders.

The tunnel was close to the site of the Weedon rail crashes in 1915 and 1951 in which a total of 25 people died, though was unconnected with the cause of either.

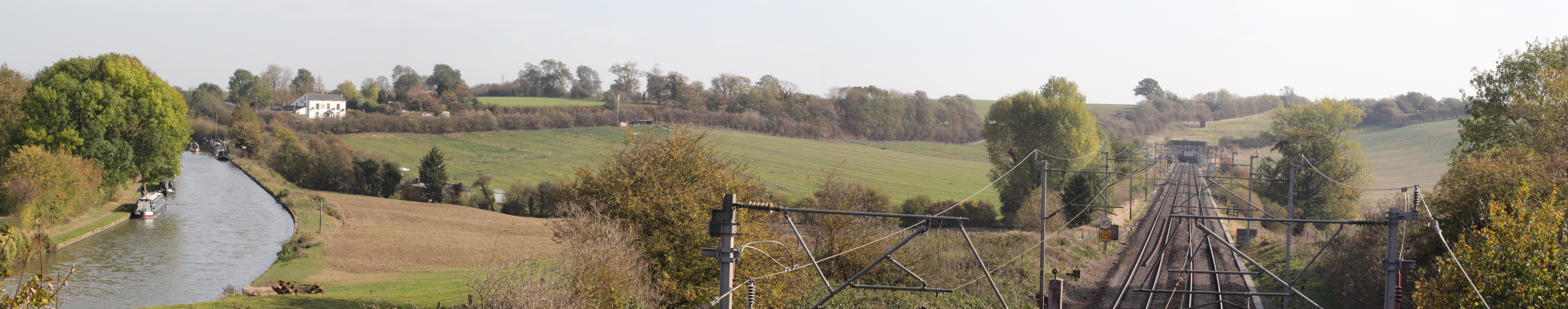
View from the Grand Union Canal in the east located just south of Weedon with the West Coast Main Line and Stowe Hill tunnel in the south-east
