= Elizabeth Woodville School =

Location
- Deanshanger, Northamptonshire, MK19 6HN; England; 52.0496°N 0.8816°W

Information
- Type: Academy
- Established: 2011 by the merger of Roade School (1956) and Kingsbrook School (1958)
- Local authority: West Northamptonshire
- Department for Education URN: 143421 Tables
- Ofsted: Reports
- Headteacher: Hannah Jones and Emma Reed
- Gender: Mixed
- Age: 11 to 19
- Website: ewsacademy.org.uk

The Elizabeth Woodville School is a secondary school with academy status located in Deanshanger, Northamptonshire, run by the Tove Learning Trust. Opened in 1958, it was originally named Deanshanger School, being renamed Kingsbrook School, Kingsbrook Specialist Business and Enterprise College (or Kingsbrook College), and to Elizabeth Woodville School in 2011. Between 2011 and 2026, it was amalgamated with Roade Sports College, being located at two sites in the villages of Deanshanger, and Roade, both in West Northamptonshire. The merged school was named after Elizabeth Woodville, who was born in Grafton Regis, halfway between the two sites, and was Queen consort of King Edward IV. In 2026, the school de-amalgamated, with the Roade campus being named "Roade Village Academy" and the Deanshanger campus retaining the Elizabeth Woodville School name.

The school's inspection report, latest results and related data are published in the Department for Education's national tables.

== History ==
=== Elizabeth Woodville School ===
Kingsbrook and Roade Colleges were merged and renamed to Elizabeth Woodville School in September 2011. On 1 December 2012 the school became an academy, run by the Learning Schools Trust. It was transferred to the Tove Learning Trust on 1 November 2016.

=== Kingsbrook College ===
The catchment area of Kingsbrook College included Alderton, Cosgrove, Deanshanger, Furtho, Grafton Regis, Old Stratford, Passenham, Paulerspury, Potterspury, Pury End, Puxley, Wicken and Yardley Gobion.

The former Kingsbrook School was given specialist status in 2006, following a grant from the Specialist Schools and Academies Trust (SSAT). In June 2009 an Ofsted inspection judged the school to be "satisfactory".

In 2007 the school were runners-up in SSATs Student Voice competition, and in March 2008, Kingsbrook held its first Student Voice Conference, and the first of the type held in the county. Schools from the local area such as Campion, Guilsborough and Road College, as well as those outside the area (i.e. Henley), attended the event and listened into the ways in which the idea of Student Voice can be and has been developed within the school.

Kingsbrook College was a member of the Luffield Group, which is a group of state and private schools in North Bucks and South Northamptonshire.

On 14 March 2011 the school announced a proposed merger with Roade Sports College, citing falling roll, poor results and inadequate budget management.

The site covers approximately four square kilometres (1 1/2 square miles), and was the site of a Roman villa from the 1st century AD to the middle of the 4th century.

The site has a TigerTurf "All Weather Pitch", which received a FIFA Recommended 1 Star rating.

=== Roade Sports College ===
Like Kingsbrook College, Roade was also a Sports College in Northamptonshire with about 1,150 pupils.

The sports facilities of the school comprise a 25 yard swimming pool, fitness suite, multipurpose games area (astroturf) a large astroturf hockey pitch, multiple tennis courts and an indoor multi sports hall.

The catchment area extended to Grange Park, Collingtree, Hackleton, Hardingstone, Blisworth, Stoke Bruerne and several other villages in the area. The school opened in 1956 as Roade Secondary Modern School, changing to a Comprehensive School in 1975.

== Notable alumni ==
=== Kingsbrook College ===
- Gen Kitchen, Labour MP
- Clare Nasir (1983–1988), meteorologist and GMTV presenter

=== Roade Sports College ===
- Derek Redmond, British Athlete, Olympian (Barcelona 1992), attended Roade Sports College, where a multi-use sports hall is named after him.
- David Capel, English cricketer who played for Northamptonshire county cricket club and the English cricket team.
