= Weedon rail crashes =

Two railway incidents in Northamptonshire, England

Weedon, Northamptonshire on the West Coast Main Line has been the site of two serious derailments in 1915 and 1951, killing 10 and 15 people respectively. Both were unusual in being caused by mechanical failures on steam locomotives.

== 1915 rail crash ==
Weedon rail crash (1915)

Details
- Date: 14 August 1915
- Location: Weedon, Northamptonshire
- Coordinates: 52.22212°N 1.06387°W
- Country: England
- Line: West Coast Main Line
- Operator: London and North Western Railway
- Incident type: Derailment
- Cause: Detached coupling rod

Statistics
- Trains: 2
- Deaths: 10
- Injured: 21

On Saturday, 14 August 1915, the 08:45 Birmingham to Euston express passenger train, hauled by LNWR George the Fifth Class locomotive No. 1489 Wolfhound, lost a taper pin; its purpose was to lock a screwed collar which retained the offside coupling rod to its crank pin. The coupling rod detached and struck one of the sleepers on the up line; pushing the track out of alignment just as the 08:30 Euston to Holyhead Irish Mail train approached. It consisted of 15 coaches hauled by two locomotives; LNWR Renown Class No. 1971 Aurora and Precedent Class No. 1189 Stewart and was travelling at 60 miles per hour. Both locomotives and every carriage was derailed; several being thrown down an embankment, killing 10 passengers and injuring 21 more. The approximate location of the collision was 52°13′20″N 1°03′50″W between Weedon and Stowe Hill tunnel. The loss of the taper pin had originally been noticed at Rugby and a new one had been rapidly substituted by a fitter, but this had then fallen out. It was unclear why the collar unscrewed on the second occasion but not the first.

== 1951 rail crash ==
Weedon rail crash (1951)

Details
- Date: 21 September 1951; 11:15
- Location: Weedon, Northamptonshire
- Coordinates: 52.22559°N 1.07219°W
- Country: England
- Line: West Coast Main Line
- Operator: British Railways
- Incident type: Derailment
- Cause: Jammed axlebox

Statistics
- Trains: 1
- Deaths: 15
- Injured: 35

On Friday, 21 September 1951 the 08:20 Liverpool Lime Street to London Euston passenger service consisting of 15 coaches hauled by a Princess class Stanier Pacific began to de-rail south of Weedon, Northamptonshire, on the West Coast Main Line south of Rugby, at a speed of 60 - 65 mph and finally crashed, killing 15 people and injuring 35 more. The footplate crew survived and protected their train in spite of being severely shocked.

The accident enquiry, conducted by Lt Col G R S Wilson, found the track to be in good condition and the speed of the train not to be excessive. However this was the first trip out for the locomotive, No 46207 Princess Arthur of Connaught after its bogie wheelsets had been swapped round. The enquiry concluded that the derailment was caused by an excessively tight bogie axlebox. The approximate location of the collision was 52°13′32″N 1°04′20″W, less than a mile south-east of the 1915 derailment and close to the signal-box at Heyford south of Stowe Hill tunnel where the occupants were able to see the accident.

== Parallels ==
It is very rare for rail crashes to take place due to a technical fault on a locomotive; most are caused by drivers' or signalmen's errors. It is therefore a remarkable coincidence for two crashes to take place in the same location, both being due to mechanical failure and both causes being unique for fatal British accidents. The first accident was also rare in that a defect on one train caused an accident to another, though a similar occurrence also happened in the Settle rail crash in 1960.
