= Weedon Viaduct =

Railway viaduct in Weedon Bec, Daventry, Northamptonshire, England

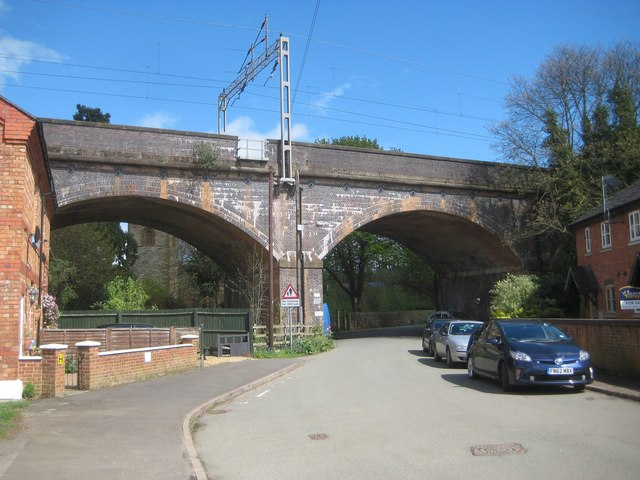
- The viaduct in 2015
- Coordinates: 52°13′40″N 1°04′30″W
- Carries: West Coast Main Line
- Crosses: River Nene
- Locale: Weedon Bec, Northamptonshire, England
- Heritage status: Grade II listed building

Characteristics
- Material: Brick
- Total length: 50 yd (46 m)
- No. of spans: 5

History
- Opened: 1838

Location
- Interactive map of Weedon Viaduct

Weedon Viaduct is a railway bridge carrying the West Coast Main Line through Weedon Bec in Northamptonshire, England. It was designed by Robert Stephenson for the London and Birmingham Railway and opened in 1838. It is a Grade II listed building.

== Description ==
The viaduct crosses Church Street and the young River Nene in Weedon Bec, on the outskirts of the village. It was built in stock brick but has been extensively patched with blue brick and dressed with stone. It has five low semi-circular arches with stone springers (the lowest block in the arches). The arches have a 50-foot (15-metre) span, giving a total length of 50 yards (46 metres). It has a roll-moulded stone string course running the length of the bridge above the arches and a brick parapet with stone copings. It terminates in splayed abutments. The viaduct is almost immediately north of Stowe Hill Tunnel near the Watford Gap, where the railway, canal, and ancient and modern roads all take a similar path. Shortly beyond the viaduct, Church Road passes through a low tunnel under the Grand Union Canal.

== History ==
The viaduct was built for the London and Birmingham Railway, whose chief engineer was Robert Stephenson. It opened with the line in 1838. The viaduct sandwiches Lower Weedon between the railway and the canal. This stretch of railway, including the viaduct, is little altered since it was built. South of Roade Cutting, the line was quadrupled in the 1880s. Stephenson originally bypassed Northampton, but the Northampton loop (opened in 1881) acts as the second pair of tracks between the cutting and Rugby, which negated the need for substantial modification.

The viaduct was one of the features illustrated by John Cooke Bourne in his series of lithographs published to mark the opening of the London and Birmingham Railway. Bourne shows the viaduct separating the village from green areas to the east, including the local churchyard which is now the opposite side of the viaduct from the church. Bourne's vantage point was the canal embankment.

The viaduct was designated a Grade II listed building in 1987. Listed building status provides legal protection from unauthorised demolition or unsympathetic modification and is applied to structures of historical and architectural importance.
