= Clare Nasir =

English meteorologist, author, and TV presenter

Clare Nasir Hawkins
- Born: Clare Lyn Nasir; 20 June 1970 (age 56); Milton Keynes, Buckinghamshire, England
- Education: University of Plymouth, B.S., M.S. Open University (diploma in International Environmental Policy, 2011); Kingsbrook School
- Occupations: Meteorologist, weather forecaster, writer, TV presenter
- Years active: 1994–present
- Spouse: Chris Hawkins (m. 2005)
- Children: 1

Clare Lyn Nasir (born 20 June 1970) is an English meteorologist, author, and TV presenter.

== Early life ==
Born in Milton Keynes, Buckinghamshire, Nasir's family is musical, with Nasir playing the saxophone, while three of her brothers are professional musicians. Nasir attended Kingsbrook School in South Northamptonshire, where in 1988 she obtained A-levels in Mathematics, Geography and History. She then studied at the University of Plymouth, graduating with an honours degree in Mathematics, continuing on with her master's degree in Applied Marine Sciences.

== Career ==
After university studies, Nasir joined the Met Office, training to become a qualified weather forecaster.

Two years later, Nasir joined the Met Office's London Weather Centre, offering weather forecasting and presenting services to London radio stations and media outlets. Subsequently, she took a position as forecaster and presenter for Anglia Television in 1997. She returned to London to work for Carlton Television in 1998.

In 2000 Nasir joined GMTV as maternity leave cover for regular weather forecaster Andrea McLean, but this led to a permanent contract, with her sharing duties with McLean following her return.

In 2001 Nasir was made weather producer and presenter being responsible for all weather output and weather-related features on GMTV. GMTV forecasts include outside broadcasts, the most famous of which involves Nasir reporting from Bridlington seafront. Being lashed by wind and rain, in the middle of the report an enormous wave burst over the harbour wall, completely covering her and sending her flying out of shot. Undeterred, she picked herself up and finished her report, having to speak directly into the boom microphone as she had lost her microphone pack.

As well as presenting the weather on GMTV, Nasir has hosted several series, including "Interactive Wedding", the travel series "Great Escapes", and "Extreme Weather", wherein she investigated globally changing weather patterns.

In 2007 Nasir served as one of many panelists on Through the Keyhole.

On 1 August 2010, the Daily Mirror announced Nasir was to quit GMTV prior to the following month, to launch a fitness DVD. On 3 September 2010, on the final broadcast of GMTV, Nasir presented her last weather forecast.

From 20 November 2010 until 27 October 2013, Nasir presented weather forecasts for the ITN produced regional news programme ITV News London on ITV London.

In 2011, Nasir completed a diploma in International Environmental Policy from the Open University.

In February 2012, Nasir appeared as a celebrity guest on the Channel 5 TV show, "Live With ..." and spoke of her journey of having achieved her goal of having a baby.

Nasir has written a regular weather-related blog column for The Huffington Post (UK).

In June 2012 Nasir presented weather forecasts for the ITN produced 5 News on Channel 5 to cover for Sian Welby while she is on holiday or a break.

As of 4 October 2013, Nasir has presented weather forecasts for the BBC North West produced regional news programme BBC North West Tonight as well as Look North for Yorkshire and Look North for Lincolnshire and Yorkshire.

Since 2016, Nasir has hosted the weather bulletins for the Met Office online. Nasir has also written a series of children's books including Colin The Cloud.

On 31 October 2016, Nasir joined as full-time weather forecaster for 5 News on Channel 5.

== Filmography ==
Television
Year	Title	Role
1997–1998	Anglia News	Weather Presenter
2000–2010	GMTV	Weather Presenter/Producer
2007	Through the Keyhole	Panelist
2010–2013	London Tonight	Weather Presenter
2012	Live with...	Herself
2012–2015, 2016–	5 News	Weather Presenter
2013	CBBC Fierce Earth	Presenter
2013–2016	BBC North West Tonight	Weather Presenter
2014–2016	BBC Look North (East Yorkshire and Lincolnshire); BBC Look North (Yorkshire and North Midlands)	Weather Presenter

== Personal life ==
Nasir has been married to DJ Chris Hawkins since March 2005. She gave birth to a daughter on 11 November 2009, seven weeks early.

In 2012, Nasir and Hawkins moved to Wilmslow as Hawkins continues working for BBC Radio 6 Music at MediaCityUK.

== Books ==
- COLIN THE CLOUD. (2014) Rudling House.
- STEVE THE STRATUS. (2015) Rudling House.
- What Does Rain Smell Like? (2019)
