= Chris Hawkins =

British DJ and radio presenter

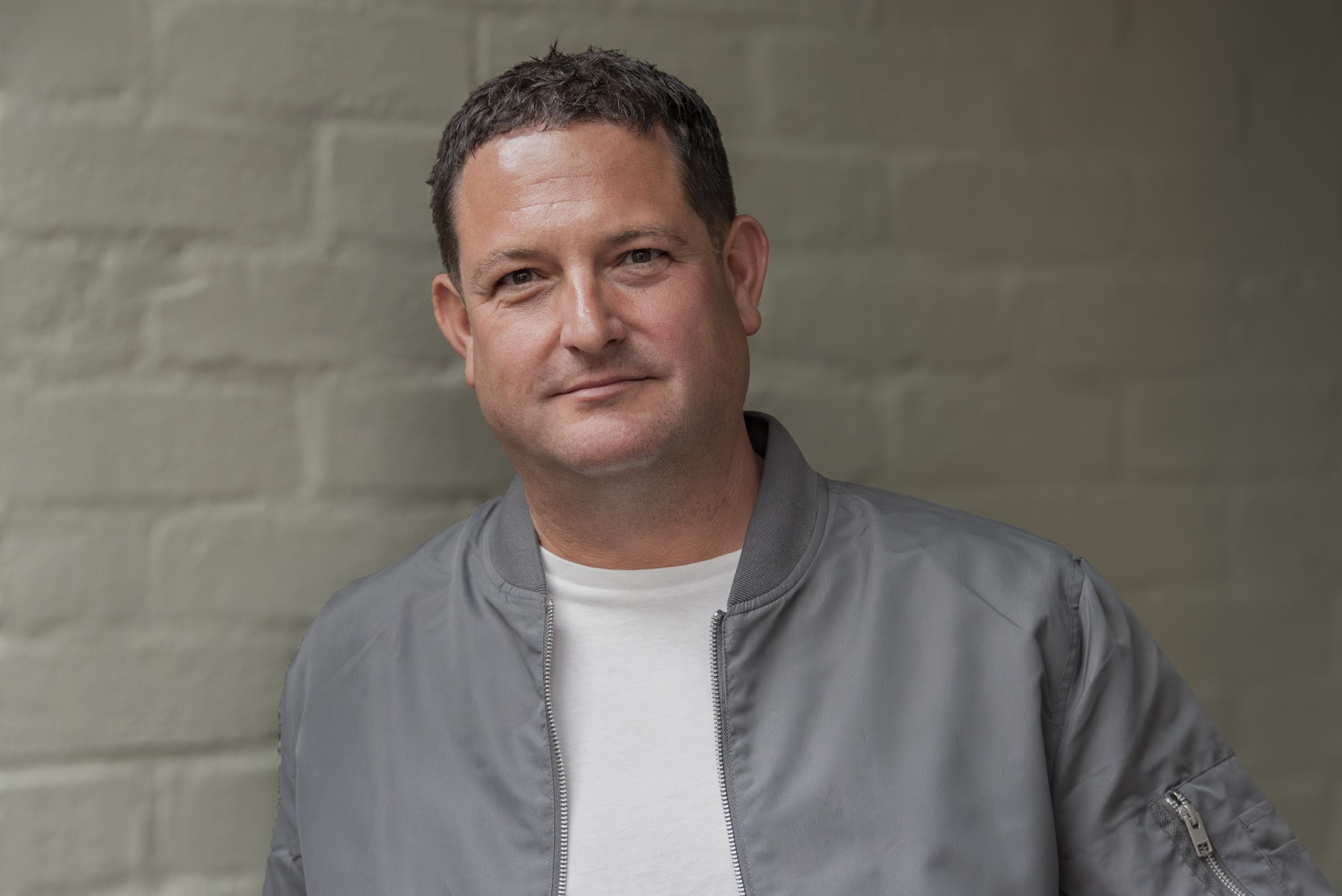
- Hawkins in 2025
- Born: Christopher Charles Hawkins; 23 September 1975 (age 51); Loppington, Shropshire, England
- Education: University of Nottingham; Ellesmere College
- Occupations: Disc jockey; Broadcaster
- Known for: Presenting the early breakfast show on BBC Radio 6 Music
- Spouse: Clare Nasir (m. 2005)
- Children: 1

Chris Hawkins (born September 23, 1975) is a British radio presenter on BBC Radio 6 Music and the host of the podcast How To DJ.

He can also be heard presenting documentary programmes on BBC Radio 4 and makes occasional appearances on BBC Radio 2 and BBC Radio 5 Live.

He makes frequent TV appearances as a personality pundit and pop-culture expert.

== Early life and education ==
Hawkins was born in Loppington, Shropshire, England.

He attended Ellesmere College in Ellesmere, Shropshire, and Tabor Academy in the United States, on an English-Speaking Union scholarship.

He studied at the University of Nottingham, where he obtained a degree in American Studies, and spent time at Middlebury College in the United States.

== Career ==
Hawkins started his radio career on BBC Radio Shropshire. He went on to BBC Radio Nottingham and BBC GLR.

He has also worked for the BBC World Service, Talk Radio UK, Real Radio, Jazz FM in London, Classic Gold and LBC 97.3.

Hawkins has appeared on Celebrity Mastermind (his specialist subject was Coronation Street), he represented the University of Nottingham on Celebrity University Challenge, winning their heat, but failing to make the semi-finals.. He has also appeared on Pointless Celebrities with Amy Macdonald.

In 2021 he launched the podcast How To DJ where he interviews the world's biggest DJs about their lives and careers. The podcast achieved great success becoming one of the UK's most popular music podcasts.

He regularly DJs and hosts and venues and festivals around the UK and Europe.

== Personal life ==
Hawkins is married to meteorologist Clare Nasir, with whom he had a child in 2009. In 2012, the family moved to Wilmslow near Salford City.
