= Deanshanger Athletic F.C. =

Association football club in England

- Full name: Deanshanger Athletic Football Club
- Founded: 1946 (80 years ago)
- Ground: Folly Road, Deanshanger
- League: North Bucks & District League Intermediate Division
- 2025–26: North Bucks & District League Intermediate Division, 5th of 12
- Website: http://www.deanshangerathletic.com
Home colours	Away colours

Deanshanger Athletic Football Club is an amateur football club based in Deanshanger, on the outskirts of Milton Keynes. Founded in 1946, the club is affiliated to the Northamptonshire Football Association. They are currently members of the North Bucks & District League Intermediate Division and play at Folly Road.

The club achieved FA Charter Standard in 2014; as well as having three teams from Under 18's upwards they also provide ladies football from 16+ there is also a youth section run by the Deanshanger Colts who are also FA Charter Standard. This incorporates boys and girls between the ages of 6–16.

== History ==
Deanshanger Athletic has played in the United Counties League and more recently the North Bucks & District League. Recent times have seen Deanshanger Athletic win League and Cup doubles in consecutive seasons and in 2013-14 Deanshanger Athletic won the North Bucks & District League Intermediate division.

== Ground ==
Deanshanger Athletic play their home games at Folly Road, Deanshanger, Milton Keynes, MK19 6HU.

== Honours ==
League

- North Bucks & District League Division One/Premier
  - Winners (9): 1950–51, 1951–52, 1952–53, 1954–55, 1956–57, 1958–59, 1959–60, 2001–02, 2002–03,
- North Bucks & District League Intermediate Division
  - Winners (1): 2013–14
- United Counties League Division Three
  - Winners (2): 1970–71, 1971–72
- Northamptonshire Women's & Girls Football League - Women's Division 2
  - Winners (1): 2017–18

Cups

- Buckingham Charity Cup
  - Winners (7): 1950–51, 1951–52, 1956–57, 1957–58, 1959–60, 1970–71, 2018–19
- North Bucks & District League Premier Division Cup
  - Winners (2): 2000–01, 2001–02
- Northamptonshire Junior Cup
  - Winners (1): 1955–56
- Northamptonshire Lower Junior Cup
  - Winners (1): 1982-83

== Current squad ==
Note: Flags indicate national team as defined under FIFA eligibility rules; some limited exceptions apply. Players may hold more than one non-FIFA nationality.

No.	Pos.	Nation	Player
-	MF	ENG	Ross Baldwin
-	MF	ENG	Sam Barker
-	DF	ENG	Luke Beaney
-	FW	ENG	Rhys Bonsell
-	DF	ENG	Michael Brown
-	DF	ENG	Darren Butters
-	DF	ENG	Terry Charlton
-	DF	ENG	Jamie Cooke
-	DF	ENG	Steve Darwin
-	-	ENG	Jack Davies
-	GK	ENG	David Elder
-	DF	ENG	Aiden Ennis
-	MF	ENG	Ethan Flanagan
-	-	ENG	Michael Frisby
-	-	ENG	Ashley Gill
-	MF	ENG	Josh Graves
-	GK	ENG	Peter Griffiths
-	GK	ENG	Simon Hall
-	-	ENG	Harry Hammond
-	MF	ENG	Jack Harris
-	-	ENG	Michael Hebley
-	CF	ENG	Rob Kettle
-	CF	ENG	Jason Lathwell

No.	Pos.	Nation	Player
-	-	ENG	Josh Lewis
-	MF	ENG	Ross Lloyd
-	-	ENG	Lewis McDade
-	FW	ENG	Rhys Merriman
-	CM	ENG	Scott Moore
-	-	ENG	Scott Parsons
-	-	ENG	David Pollard
-	FW	ENG	Conor Roberts
-	MF	ENG	Jack Rowe
-	MF	ENG	Antony Sherwood
-	-	ENG	Sam Sibley
-	-	ENG	James Spencer
-	MF	ENG	Dean Valentine
-	CM	ENG	Scott Valentine
-	MF	ENG	George Viard
-	MF	ENG	Michael Viard
-	-	ENG	Harry Wakeling
-	CB	ENG	David Walker
-	-	ENG	Matty Walkling
-	-	ENG	Jake Watkinson
-	-	ENG	Evan Wooding
-	MF	ENG	Adam Wynne-Williams
-	MF	ENG	Toby Wynne-Williams
10	FW	ENG	Josh Harris
