= Blisworth Arch =

Wolverton Viaduct
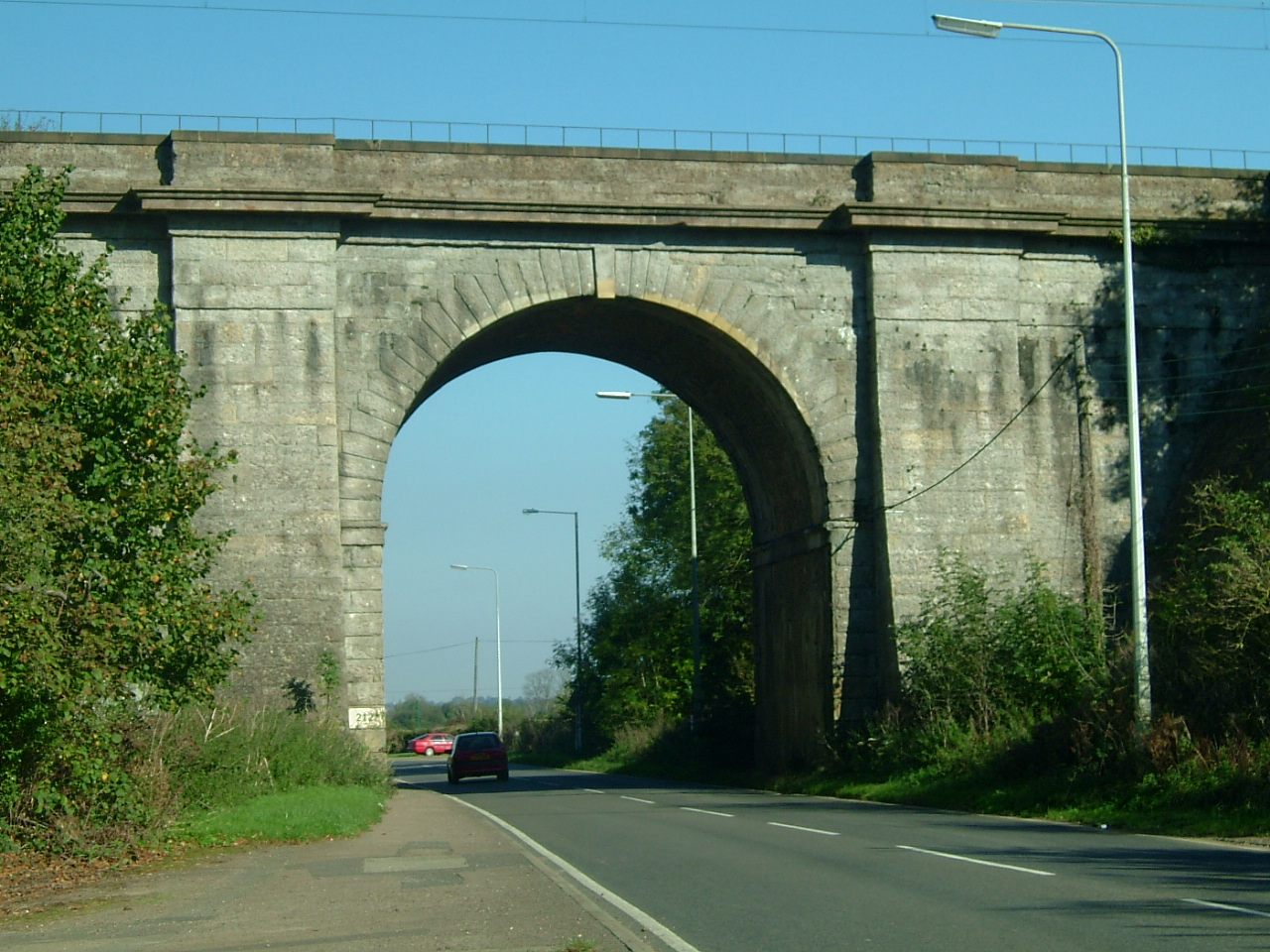
- Coordinates: 52.180883°N 0.936221°W
- Carries: West Coast Main Line
- Crosses: Northampton Road
- Locale: Blisworth, Northamptonshire, England
- Maintained by: Network Rail
- Heritage status: Grade II listed building

Characteristics
- Material: Brick

History
- Opened: 1837

Location
- Interactive map of Wolverton Viaduct

The Blisworth Arch is a railway bridge in Blisworth, Northamptonshire, in eastern England. It was designed by Robert Stephenson for the London and Birmingham Railway and completed in 1837. It is a grade II listed building and a significant local landmark.

== History ==
The name "Blisworth Arch" is a local name given to the bridge, which crosses the main Northampton to Towcester road just north of the village of Blisworth. The arch was built by 1837 for the London and Birmingham Railway (LBR), whose chief engineer was Robert Stephenson. The LBR was one of the first long-distance railways and its route became the southern section of the West Coast Main Line. As such, the Blisworth Arch remains in use. It featured in several contemporary illustrations of the construction of the LBR, including one by Thomas Roscoe.

== Description ==
The bridge is built from red brick and faced with grey lias stone. The round-headed arch is 32 feet (10 metres) tall to the crown. It has a keystone in the centre and is flanked by pilasters and imposts where these meet the arch. On either side are 10-foot (3-metre) wide tapering buttresses. A moulded cornice runs the length of the bridge above the arch and below a parapet, which is finished with stone coping. The bridge has vertical wing walls running parallel, and similar perpendicular retaining walls supporting the embankment. The bridge has undergone little alteration since it was built as neither the road nor the railway have been widened—the A43 was rerouted to bypass Blisworth and the bridge is just west of the point where the Northampton loop deviates from the main line. Up to this junction, the line was quadruple-tracked in the 1880s but the Northampton loop added capacity, negating the need to modify structures between Roade and Rugby, including the Blisworth Arch. The National Transport Trust describes it as "an elegant and lofty arch". E. A. Labrum, in the Eastern and Central England volume of Civil Engineering Heritage, calls it "a fine example of the attention to detail in bridge design which was typical of the early railway engineers".
