= Deanshanger =

Village and civil parish in England

Coordinates: 52.0473°N 0.8928°W

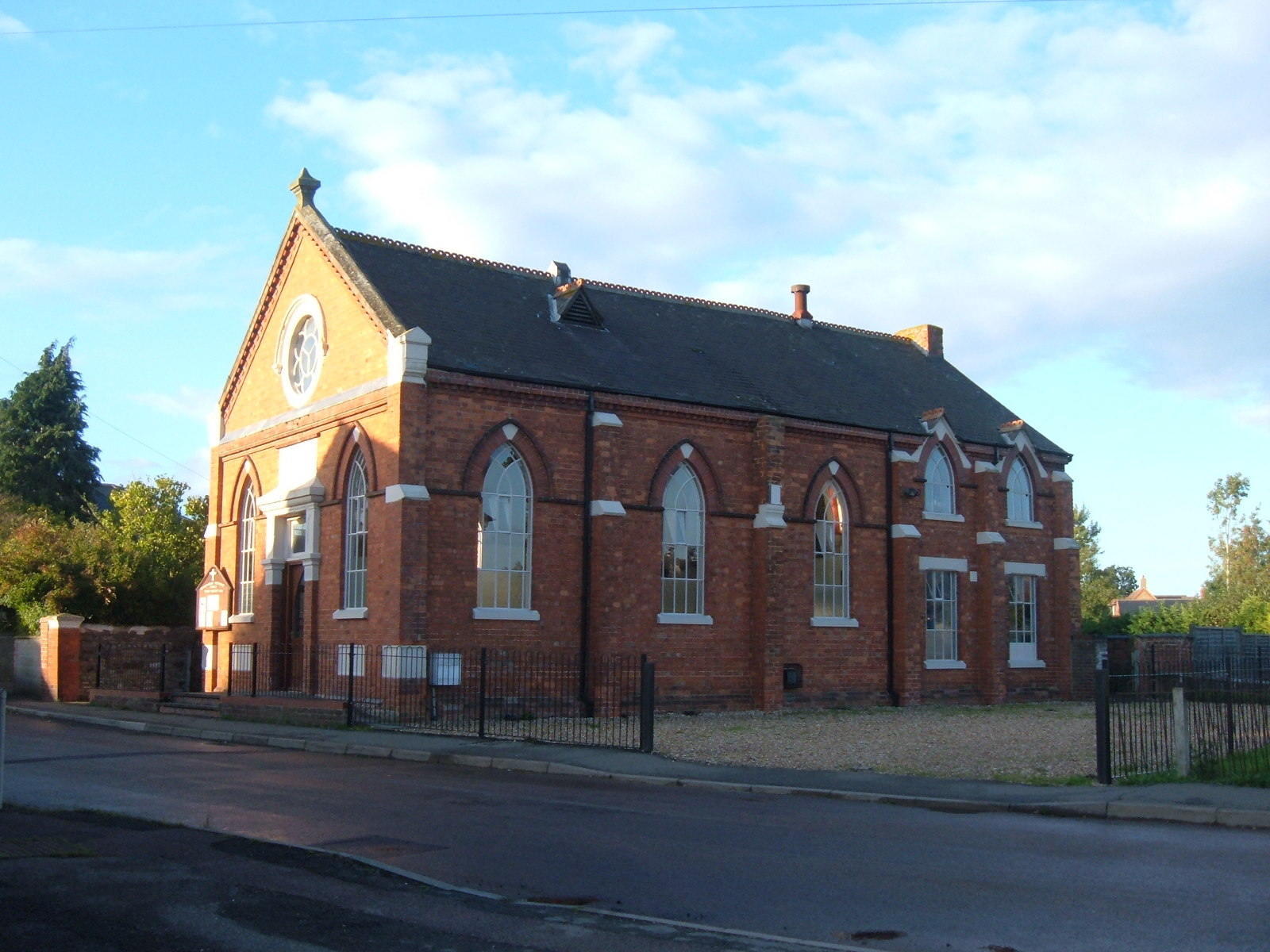
- Methodist Chapel

- Location within Northamptonshire
- Interactive map of Deanshanger
- Population: 3,817 (2011)
- OS grid reference: SP7639
  - London: 50 miles
- Civil parish: Deanshanger
- Unitary authority: West Northamptonshire
- Ceremonial county: Northamptonshire
- Region: East Midlands
- Country: England
- Sovereign state: United Kingdom
- Post town: Milton Keynes
- Postcode district: MK19
- Dialling code: 01908
- Police: Northamptonshire
- Fire: Northamptonshire
- Ambulance: East Midlands
- UK Parliament: South Northamptonshire

Deanshanger (/ˈdiːnzˌhæŋər/) is a village and civil parish in West Northamptonshire, England, near Milton Keynes. The population of the civil parish (including Puxley) at the 2011 census was 3,817. Deanshanger is 50 miles (80 km) northwest of London, 5 miles (8.0 km) northwest of Milton Keynes and 52 miles (84 km) southeast of Birmingham.

== History ==
Deanshanger used to be called Daneshanger, "hanger" being an old English word, meaning a clearing in the woods – hence Daneshanger was a clearing in the woods where the Danes lived.

The original population centre of the parish was the hamlet of Passenham. However, from the late 18th century the coming of the Grand Union Canal to the east made Deanshanger an agricultural industrial centre causing it to grow quickly. This growth accelerated with the building of the London and Birmingham Railway in the first half of the 19th century which had stations nearby in Wolverton and Roade.

After a fall out with Henry II in 1170 AD, Thomas Becket is said to have sought refuge in the Gilbertine Monastery in Deanshanger (or Dinneshangra as it was then known). Although disguised as a peasant, he was nevertheless recognised by a farm labourer. At the time the only water supply in the village was foul and brackish, and having heard of the miracle that Becket was said to have performed at nearby Northampton, the farm labourer pleaded with Becket to repeat the performance. Becket is said to have looked towards Heaven, struck the ground with his staff, and immediately a fresh spring appeared. This is one of 703 miracles that is said to have led to his canonisation.

The first public school in Deanshanger was opened in 1833 in a converted Baptist chapel. In 1858, a new village school (dubbed 'The Big School' by locals) was opened for students up to the age of thirteen. This school would later go on to be named Deanshanger Primary School.

On 11 November 1948 the civil parish of "Passenham" was renamed "Deanshanger". The eastern part of the parish was ceded to the new parish of Old Stratford which was established on 1 April 1951, also taking in parts of the parishes of Furtho and Cosgrove.

In 1958, a century after the founding of the primary school, a secondary school was established in the village. Originally called Deanshanger School, it was later renamed Kingsbrook School, after the local river, Kings Brook (a tributary of the River Great Ouse). The school, a sports college, merged with former Roade school in September 2011, and was renamed The Elizabeth Woodville School.

== Demography ==
At the time of the 2001 census, Deanshanger parish had a population of 2,900 citizens and 3,817 at the 2011 census.

Since 2007, it shares the "Deanshanger ward" of West Northamptonshire Council with Wicken parish, returning two councillors.

== Industry ==
From the 1820s, the main industry in the village was an iron foundry and later an iron oxide works (making pigment for paint). This gave some of the surrounding area a red colouration from the oxide dust. However, in 1999, the works closed and was demolished. By 2008, most of the works land has been replaced by the construction of several new housing estates. Extensive remedial work was needed to reverse the harmful effects of the previous industrial use of the site there are still signs of the red stained oxide all around the village. Some land has designated for light industrial use.

== Local amenities ==
The village has a village hall and community centre, The Deanshanger Memorial Community Centre, which was extended in 2008 to provide a venue for events and facilities for community groups, a doctor's surgery and a library. Other amenities include two pre-schools, a primary school. The secondary school (the Elizabeth Woodville School) is split over two sites across the village. The school's grounds include the site of a Roman villa.

There is a parish church (Holy Trinity, Church of England) and a Methodist chapel, a cafe, a post office, a pub and two members' clubs (sports and social, Conservative club), a pharmacy, a hairdresser, a pizza and kebab takeaway, a Chinese and fish and chips takeaway, a mobile takeaway, and other village stores.

In December 2015, The Co-operative Food opened a store on the High Street, where The Fox & Hounds Public House was situated. On the edge of the village on the A422, is a golf and country club, a hotel, an Indian restaurant and a petrol and service station. The village has a Parish Council office, which is a former school and Baptist Church, which was renovated in 2008.

=== Football ===
The village is home to Deanshanger Athletic Football Club, founded in 1946. The club consists of two men's teams (First and Reserves) who play in the North Bucks & District Football League, an under 18's team, competing in the Milton Keynes Youth Football League, and as of June 2017, a Ladies team, the first time the club has offered ladies football at a senior level. For children, there is a pre-school playgroup, youth club, and the junior football club, Deanshanger Colts.

=== Village Heritage ===
There is an active village heritage society that works to record the history of the village and record its heritage. The society organises events in the village including the planting of spring flowers on the roads into the village and the cleaning of the stream (the King's Brook).

== Transport ==
There is a regular bus service between Deanshanger and Milton Keynes and between Deanshanger and Towcester. It is the X91 service operated by Stagecoach.

Finally, there is the 83, a school service open to the public which runs from Deanshanger to Buckingham once a day (8:00AM), and Buckingham to Deanshanger (5:30PM). This bus also stops at Silverstone UTC, and is operated by a Stagecoach double decker. School bus services operate additionally between Deanshanger and Buckingham, stopping at Buckingham School and The Royal Latin School. This is the 943, operated by Bucks County Council. It leave Deanshanger in convoy at 8:10, and generally leave Buckingham (Via RLS) at about 15:45, arriving back at 16:00.

The nearest railway station is Wolverton for services to London Euston railway station, Bletchley, Milton Keynes, Northampton, Birmingham and north. Milton Keynes railway station (on the same line) is the nearest station to give access to fast trains to London (40 minutes), intercity and cross-country services. There are several private hire taxi services.

The A422 road used to pass through Deanshanger, curving sharply at the Beehive pub. As Milton Keynes expanded through the 1970s and 80s, traffic counts increased sharply through the village and calls for a bypass grew. In November 1991, local newspapers reported permission had been granted for a new bypass to be built. The new road opened in March 1993. The A422 now takes a more direct route past Deanshanger from Old Stratford towards Buckingham.

== See also ==
- Wolverton and Stony Stratford Tramway
