= North Bucks & District Football League =

Association football league in England

- Founded: 1911
- Country: England
- Divisions: Premier Division; Intermediate Division; Division One
- Number of clubs: 45 (2025-26)
- Promotion to: Spartan South Midlands Football League Division Two; United Counties Football League Division One
- Domestic cup(s): Inter Divisional Challenge Cup; Premier Division Challenge Trophy; Intermediate Division Challenge Trophy; Division One Challenge Trophy; Reserve Team Challenge Trophy
- Current champions: Premier Division – Stewkley FC (2025–26) Intermediate Division – Silverstone FC (2024–25) Division One – MK City FC (2024–25)
- Website: Official website

The North Bucks & District Football League, commonly referred to as the North Bucks League, is a competition affiliated to the Berks & Bucks County Football Association featuring amateur association football clubs primarily in Northern Buckinghamshire, England, although there are members from the surrounding counties of Oxfordshire, Northamptonshire and Bedfordshire. The league was established in 1911 and is split into three divisions: the Premier Division, the Intermediate Division, and Division One, which sit in the 12th to 14th tiers of the English football league system. The Premier Division sits immediately below the lowest level of the National League System – Step 7. Promotion to Step 7 is not automatic, but can be applied for by the Premier Division winner and runner-up, and granted if meeting the ground/facility requirement of the league.

The current champions of the Premier Division are Stewkley FC, who won the league for the second time in their history in the 2024–25 season, and then went on to retain the title in 2025-26. Along with the league title win, Stewkley secured both the Premier and Interdivisional cups to become the first side in league history to win all three trophies in one season.

== Format ==
Locations of all the league's football clubs for the 2014–15 season in relation to the county of Buckinghamshire.

=== League ===
The North Bucks League's teams are grouped into three divisions: the Premier Division, the Intermediate Division, and Division One. In any given season a club plays each of the others in the same division twice, once at their home ground and once at that of their opponents. Many of the league's teams are reserve teams of North Bucks League clubs. These second teams are barred from competing in the same division, while any club that fields only one side in the North Bucks League but has a first team at a higher level may not enter a team in the lower two divisions of the North Bucks League.

Clubs gain three points for a win, one for a draw, and none for a defeat. At the end of the season, clubs towards the top of their division may win promotion to the next higher division, while those at the bottom may be relegated to the next lower one. The top club in the Premier Division may be promoted to the Spartan South Midlands Football League Division Two, but in practice application to the South Midlands League is separate from this, and is more dependent on the club facilities than on league position. Sometimes clubs are promoted to leagues which better suit their location, such as the United Counties Football League Division One for more northerly-based teams. Clubs are promoted to and relegated from the component leagues of the North Bucks League at the end of each season, but relegation from Division Two is not possible because there is no lower-level football competition in the region in the league system. Division size is capped at eighteen.

The more demanding requirements of the South Midlands League have led to some clubs remaining in the North Bucks League despite continued dominance, as they do not meet or do not wish to meet the standards required off the pitch. Other teams have moved to the South Midlands League from a lower level, skipping the Premier Division. Both Bletchley Town and MK Wanderers moved from the North Bucks Division One to the Spartan South Midlands Division Two for the 2008–09 season, although Milton Keynes Wanderers did resign early in the following season after a string of heavy defeats and resumed membership of the North Bucks & District League.

=== Cups ===
The North Bucks & District Football League organises knock-out cup competitions. For example, the three Challenge Trophy competitions, the Inter Divisional Challenge Cup and the Reserve Team Challenge Trophy. The Challenge Trophy is open to all of the league's teams, but is split into three sections, so that there is a separate competition for each division. The final of each tournament is played at a neutral venue. The Inter Divisional Challenge Cup is competed in by all first-team members of the North Bucks League and was re-introduced for the 2010–11 season. The Reserve Team Challenge Trophy is organised in the same manner as the Inter Divisional Challenge Cup but only the reserve teams are eligible. Additionally, clubs may be invited to play in the Buckingham Charity Cup and can enter County Cups organised by the Berks & Bucks FA, although some teams fall under the auspices of other county authorities. Reserve sides whose first teams compete at a higher level (for example in the Spartan South Midlands League) are not considered reserve sides for the purpose of the 2 inter-divisional cup competitions.

== History ==
The league was established in 1911 to serve a similar area that it does today.

== Governance ==
The League Management Committee meets monthly and consists of the following members as of 2013:

- Kelly Hawkins – League Secretary – League County Rep
- Phillip Houghton – Chairman and Referee Secretary
- John Fenner – Treasurer
- Kelly Hawkins – Registration Secretary
- Brian Stuchbury
- Paul Hammond

== Clubs ==
Below were the listed member clubs of the North Bucks & District Football League for the 2025–26 season.

=== Premier Division ===
| Club | Founded | Affiliation | Position in 2025-26 |
|---|---|---|---|
| Olney FC | 2001 | Berks & Bucks FA | 2nd |
| Woburn & Wavendon FC | 1976 | Bedfordshire FA | 10th |
| Great Horwood | 1966 | Berks & Bucks FA | 1st |
| AFC Carpathians | 2020 | Berks & Bucks FA | 4th |
| Hanslope | 1911 | Berks & Bucks FA | 7th |
| Marsh Gibbon | 1938 | Berks & Bucks FA | 9th |
| MK United | 2020 | Berks & Bucks FA | 5th |
| Wing Village | 1896 | Berks & Bucks FA | 6th |
| Real MK | 2022 | Berks & Bucks FA | 11th |
| Stewkley | 1946 | Berks & Bucks FA | 2nd |
| Twyford United | 1903 | Berks & Bucks FA | 8th |

=== Intermediate Division ===
| Club | Founded | Affiliation | Position in 2025-26 |
|---|---|---|---|
| Milton Keynes Athletic | 2020 | Berks & Bucks FA | 2nd |
| Silverstone FC | 1903 | Northamptonshire FA | 1st |
| Finmere FC | 1985 | Berks & Bucks FA | 3rd |
| Grendon Rangers | 1947 | Berks & Bucks FA | 8th |
| Newport Pagnell Town Athletic | 2008 | Berks & Bucks FA | 4th |
| Grid City Warriors | 2015 | Berks & Bucks FA | 5th |
| Stewkley Development | 1946 | Berks & Bucks | 6th |
| Emberton United | 2025 | Berks & Bucks FA | 7th |
| Deanshanger Athletic | 1946 | Berks & Bucks FA | 9th |
| MK Royals | | Berks & Bucks FA | 10th |
| Hanslope Reserves | 1911 | Berks & Bucks FA | 11th |
| Buckingham FC Saturday 'A' | 1933 | Berks & Bucks FA | 12th |

=== Division One ===
| Club | Founded | Affiliation | Position in 2025-26 |
|---|---|---|---|
| Deanshanger Athletic Reserves | 1946 | Berks & Bucks FA | 1st |
| Milton Keynes City FC | 1986 | Berks & Bucks FA | 2nd |
| Wing Village Development | 1896 | Berks & Bucks FA | 3rd |
| Great Horwood Reserves | 1966 | Berks & Bucks FA | 4th |
| Tattenhoe FC | 2025 | Berks & Bucks FA | 5th |
| Milton Keynes Athletic Reserves | 2020 | Berks & Bucks FA | 6th |
| Olney FC Reserves | 2001 | Berks & Bucks FA | 7th |
| MK United Development | 2020 | Berks & Bucks FA | 8th |
| Real MK Reserves | 2022 | Berks & Bucks FA | 9th |
| Silverstone FC Reserves | 1903 | Northamptonshire FA | 10th |
| Marsh Gibbon Development | 1938 | Berks & Bucks FA | 11th |
| Bletchley Scot Reserves | | Berks & Bucks FA | 12th |

=== Division Two (No longer in place as of 2022-23) ===
| Club | Founded | Affiliation | Position in 2015–16 |
|---|---|---|---|
| Brackley Sports Reserves | 2004 | Northamptonshire FA | 7th |
| Hanslope Reserves | 1911 | Berks & Bucks FA | 8th |
| Marsh Gibbon Reserves | 1938 | Berks & Bucks FA | 9th |
| Padbury Village Reserves | 2011 | Berks & Bucks FA | 11th |
| Silverstone Reserves | 1971 | Northamptonshire FA | 6th |
| Westbury | 1948 | Berks & Bucks FA | 5th |
| Wing Village Reserves | — | Berks & Bucks FA | 3rd |
| Willen Reserves | 1989 | Berks & Bucks FA | New Entry |
| Yardley Gobion Reserves | 1906 | Northamptonshire FA | 10th |
| Deanshanger Athletic Reserves | 1946 | Northamptonshire FA | 12th, Division One |
| MK Wanderers Reserves | — | Berks & Bucks FA | Withdrew, Intermediate Division |
| Tattenhoe Reserves | 2006 | Berks & Bucks FA | New Entry |
| Buckingham United Reserves | 2011 | Berks & Bucks FA | New Entry |
| Steeple Claydon Reserves | 1952 | Berks & Bucks FA | New Entry |

=== Notable members ===
Current Premier Division sides Bow Brickhill and Buckingham Town Reserves along with Intermediate Division side Grendon Rangers have competed at a higher level. Bow Brickhill spent two years in Spartan South Midlands League Division One, while Buckingham Town's second string spent a year in the United Counties League Division Two before its departure to a dedicated reserve league. Grendon Rangers spent 4 seasons in the Spartan South Midlands League Division 2.

Former members Buckingham Athletic, Buckingham Town, Brackley Town, Olney Town, Mursley United, Cranfield United, Newport Pagnell Wanderers – now called Newport Pagnell Town following a name change, and Padbury Village FC – are among the clubs which have competed at a higher level. Buckingham Athletic are currently competing in Spartan South Midlands League Division One and last competed in the North Bucks & District Football League in 1985, having enjoyed membership for seven seasons following relegation from the Hellenic League. Mursley United played in the division below Buckingham Athletic, having left the North Bucks League in 1996, three years after joining it. Buckingham Town and Newport Pagnell Town compete in the United Counties League, Buckingham Town and Olney in Division One and Newport Pagnell in the Premier Division. Olney were founder members of the North Bucks League in 1911, but left for the East Northants League after the Second World War before returning in the 1930s. The early 1960s saw the club move back to the East Northants League, then known as the Rushden District League. Shortly after that, they gained promotion to the United Counties League, where they have remained ever since. Newport Pagnell joined the North Bucks League after formation in 1963 before gaining promotion in 1972. Brackley Town are the ex-North Bucks League side that play at the highest level; they currently participate in the Conference North and hold the record the ex-North Bucks League member making the longest run in the FA Cup, achieving appearances in the FA Cup Second Round Proper in 2013 and 2024. Brackley played in the League in two spells: from post-World War II until 1968 and from 1974 until 1983. Cranfield United, who never won the North Bucks League, compete in the Spartan South Midlands League Division One.

== Past winners ==
=== 1911–1932 ===
The League originally consisted of just one division. Three seasons of competition were held before the outbreak of the First World War. Competition re-commenced two years after the First World War ended. This is a list of winners for the period in which the League had one division, which ended in 1932.

| Year | League |
|---|---|
| 1911–12 | Cosgrove St Peter |
| 1912–13 | Stantonbury St Peter |
| 1913–14 | Stantonbury St Peter |
| 1914–20 | League suspended due to World War I |
| 1920–21 | Newport Autos |
| 1921–22 | Newport Autos |
| 1922–23 | Wolverton Town |
| 1923–24 | Newport Autos |
| 1924–25 | Buckingham Town |
| 1925–26 | Stony Stratford S. |
| 1926–27 | Winslow United |
| 1927–28 | Cosgrove St Peter |
| 1928–29 | Buckingham Town |
| 1929–30 | Bletchley L.M.S. |
| 1930–31 | Winslow United |
| 1931–32 | Wolverton Town |

=== 1932–1973 ===
In 1932, the Second Division was introduced. Seven years later, competition was interrupted by global conflict for the second time in the form of the Second World War. Competition was halted in 1939 and begun again in 1946. This section documents the champions of both divisions until the introduction of a third tier in 1973.

| Year | Division One | Division Two | |
| 1932–33 | Salmon Sports | Olney Town | |
| 1933–34 | Buckingham Town | Newport Athletic | |
| 1934–35 | Potterspury | Wolverton Congs | |
| 1935–36 | Buckingham Town | Cranfield United | |
| 1936–37 | Buckingham Town | Yardley Gobion | |
| 1937–38 | Potterspury | Old Bradwell | |
| 1938–39 | Stantonbury St Peter | Emberton | |
| 1939–46 | League suspended due to World War II | | |
| 1946–47 | Bletchley L.M.S. | Stony Stratford S. | |
| 1947–48 | Towcester Town | Cosgrove St Peter | |
| 1948–49 | Buckingham Town | Roade | Cranfield United(Shield) |
| 1949–50 | Buckingham Town | Bletchley B.O.B.B. | |
| 1950–51 | Deanshanger Athletic | Silverstone British Legion | |
| 1951–52 | Deanshanger Athletic | Castlethorpe | |
| 1952–53 | Deanshanger Athletic | Tingewick Sports | |
| 1953–54 | Castlethorpe | C.A.D. Buckingham | |
| 1954–55 | Deanshanger Athletic | Roade | |
| 1955–56 | Castlethorpe | C.A.D. Buckingham | Castlethorpe Reserves (Div 3) |
| 1956–57 | Deanshanger Athletic | Stony Stratford Town | |
| 1957–58 | Castlethorpe | Steeple Claydon | |
| 1958–59 | Deanshanger Athletic | Blakesley & Woodend | |
| 1959–60 | Deanshanger Athletic | Cosgrove St Peter | |
| 1960–61 | Silverstone British Legion | North Crawley | Buckingham Athletic (Inter-Div) |
| 1961–62 | Olney Town | Yardley Gobion | |
| 1962–63 | Hanslope | Syresham | |
| 1963–64 | Yardley Gobion | Mursley United | |
| 1964–65 | Hanslope | Winslow United | Newport Pagnell Wanderers (Div 3) |
| 1965–66 | Yardley Gobion | Roade | |
| 1966–67 | Towcester Town | Newport Pagnell Wanderers | |
| 1967–68 | Newport Pagnell Wanderers | Towcester Town Reserves | |
| 1968–69 | Newport Pagnell Wanderers | Newport Pagnell Wanderers Reserves | |
| 1969–70 | Newport Pagnell Wanderers | Newport Pagnell Wanderers Reserves | |
| 1970–71 | Yardley Gobion | Syresham | |
| 1971–72 | Sherington | Blakesley United | |
| 1972–73 | Yardley Gobion | Cosgrove St Peter | |

=== 1973–1994 ===
1973 witnessed the introduction of a third division. Named the Premier Division, it sat above Division One and Division Two. This section lists the champions of all three divisions until a fourth tier was introduced in 1994.

| Year | Premier Division | | Division One | | Division Two | |
| Year | League | Cup | League | Cup | League | Cup |
|---|---|---|---|---|---|---|
| 1973–74 | Grendon Rangers | | Yardley Gobion | | Yardley Gobion Reserves | |
| 1974–75 | Grendon Rangers | Buckingham Town | Yardley Gobion | | Yardley Gobion Reserves | |
| 1975–76 | Middleton Cheney | | Yardley Gobion | | Galley Hill | |
| 1976–77 | Middleton Cheney | Middleton Cheney | Galley Hill | | Blakesley | |
| 1977–78 | McCorquodale | | Old Bradwell United | | North Crawley | |
| 1978–79 | | | | | | |
| 1979–80 | | | | | | |
| 1980–81 | | | | | | |
| 1981–82 | | | | | | |
| 1982–83 | Newport Town | | | | | |
| 1983–84 | | Buckingham Athletic | | | | |
| 1984–85 | Buckingham Athletic | | | | | |
| 1985–86 | | | | | | |
| 1986–87 | | | | | | |
| 1987–88 | | | | | | |
| 1988–89 | Shenley & Loughton | | | | | |
| 1989–90 | Kettering Nomads | | | | | |
| 1990–91 | | | | | | |
| 1991–92 | Roade | | | | | |
| 1992–93 | Stewkley | | | | | |
| 1993–94 | Earls Barton utd | | | | | |

=== 1994–2010 ===
The most recent expansion of the league involved the introduction of a fourth division, the Intermediate Division, in 1994.

| Year | Premier Division | | Intermediate Division | | Division One | | Division Two | |
| Year | League | Cup | League | Cup | League | Cup | League | Cup |
|---|---|---|---|---|---|---|---|---|
| 1994–95 | Potterspury | | Mursley United | | Potterspury Reserves | | Milton Keynes Athletic Reserves | |
| 1995–96 | Potterspury | | | | | | | |
| 1996–97 | Newport Athletic | | Milton Keynes Athletic | | Westbury | | Sherington Reserves | |
| 1997–98 | Padbury United | | | | | | | |
| 1998–99 | Padbury United | | | | | | | |
| 1999–00 | | Padbury United | | | | | | |
| 2000–01 | | | | | | | | |
| 2001–02 | Roade | Roade | | | | | | |
| 2002–03 | Deanshanger Athletic | Deanshanger Athletic | | Castlethorpe | | | | |
| 2003–04 | | | | | | | PB (Milton Keynes) or Steeple Claydon Reserves | |
| 2004–05 | Steeple Claydon | Stewkley | Heath Panthers United | | PB (Milton Keynes) | Loughton Athletic | Brickhill Rangers | Brickhill Rangers |
| 2005–06 | Potterspury | | PB (Milton Keynes) | | Brickhill Rangers | Brickhill Rangers | Brackley Sports Reserves | |
| 2006–07 | PB (Milton Keynes) | PB (Milton Keynes) | Thornborough Athletic | | Brackley Sports Reserves | Great Linford | Lavendon Sports Reserves | |
| 2007–08 | PB (Milton Keynes) | PB (Milton Keynes) | Brickhill Rangers | | Rangers XI | Wolverton Town | Wolverton Town Reserves | E&H |
| 2008–09 | Lavendon Sports | Brickhill Rangers | Sherington | Sherington | Woburn Sands Wanderers | | Westbury | Heath Panthers United |
| 2009–10 | Steeple Claydon | | Potterspury | | Heath Panthers United | Heath Panthers United | Stewkley Reserves | |

=== 2010–present ===
At the end of the 2009–10 season, the League decided to re-introduce the Inter Divisional Cup for the 2010–11 season.

| Year | Premier Division | | Intermediate Division | | Division One | | Division Two | | Inter Divisional Cup |
| Year | League | Cup | League | Cup | League | Cup | League | Cup | Inter Divisional Cup |
|---|---|---|---|---|---|---|---|---|---|
| 2010–11 | Brackley Sports | Hale Leys United | Milton Keynes Wanderers Reserves | Great Linford | Celtic Milton Keynes | Celtic Milton Keynes | Olney Town Colts | Olney Town Colts | Potterspury |
| 2011–12 | Milton Keynes Wanderers Reserves | Potterspury | Great Horwood | Great Horwood | Potterspury Reserves | Charlton & District | City Colt Reserves | Wolverton Town Reserves | Potterspury |
| 2012–13 | Potterspury | Loughton Manor | Woburn Sands Wanderers | Denbigh Hall Sports & Social | Bow Brickhill Reserves | Bow Brickhill Reserves | Comet MK | Comet MK | City Colts |
| 2013–14 | City Colts | Potterspury | Deanshanger Athletic | Milton Keynes Titans | Stantonbury Social Elite | Stantonbury Social Elite | Syresham Reserves | Syresham Reserves | Stantonbury Social Elite |
| 2014–15 | Potterspury | Loughton Manor | Milton Keynes Titans | Southcott Village Residents Association | Twyford United | Syresham Reserves | Milton Keynes Wanderers 'A' | City Colts 'A' | Milton Keynes Wanderers |
| 2015–16 | Potterspury | Potterspury | Milton Keynes Gallacticos | Milton Keynes Gallacticos | Wing Village | University of Buckingham | Southcott Village Residents Association Reserves | Padbury Village Reserves | Towcester Town |
| 2016–17 | Potterspury | Great Horwood | Wing Village | Willen | City Colts | City Colts | Hanslope Reserves | MK Wanderers Reserves | Great Horwood |
| 2017–18 | Potterspury | Duston Dynamo | Olney | Stoke Hammond Wanderers | Bletchley Park | Buckingham United | Tattenhoe Reserves | Tattenhoe Reserves | Silverstone |
| 2018–19 | Duston Dynamo | Potterspury | Marsh Gibbon | Wing Village | Willen | Hanslope Reserves | Silverstone Reserves | MK Wanderers Reserves | Potterspury |
| 2019–20 | League suspended due to COVID-19 pandemic | | | | | | | | |
| 2020–21 | Great Horwood | Hanslope | Willen | MK Irish Athletic | Silverstone | Westbury | Stony Stratford | Olney Reserves | Potterspury |
| 2021–22 | Great Horwood | Hanslope | Stoke Hammond | Stoke Hammond | Stony Stratford Town | Stony Stratford Town | MK City | Olney Reserves | Willen |
| 2022-23 | Stony Stratford Town | Great Linford FC | Silverstone FC | Hanslope Reserves | Wing Village FC | FC Impact | - | - | Stony Stratford Town |
| 2023-24 | MK United | Olney FC | Marsh Gibbon | Woburn & Wavendon | AFC Carpathians | Silverstone FC Reserves | - | - | Old Bradwell United Development |
| 2024-25 | Stewkley | MK United | Olney | Grendon Rangers | Grid City Warriors | Stewkley Development | - | - | Silverstone |
| 2025-26 | Stewkley | Stewkley | Silverstone | Emberton | MK City | Wing Development | - | - | Stewkley |

=== Titles by club ===
This is an incomplete list of clubs that have been North Bucks League champions in order of success.

| Club | Titles | Years |
|---|---|---|
| Potterspury | 10 | 1934–35, 1937–38, 1994–95, 1995–96, 2005–06, 2012–13, 2014–15, 2015–16, 2016–17, 2017–18 |
| Deanshanger Athletic | 9 | 1950–51, 1951–52, 1952–53, 1954–55, 1956–57, 1958–59, 1959–60, 2001–02, 2002–03 |
| Buckingham Town | 7 | 1924–25, 1928–29, 1933–34, 1935–36, 1936–37, 1948–49, 1949–50 |
| Yardley Gobion | 4 | 1963–64, 1965–66, 1970–71, 1972–73 |
| Castlethorpe | 3 | 1953–54, 1955–56, 1957–58 |
| Newport Autos | 3 | 1920–21, 1921–22, 1923–24 |
| Newport Pagnell Town | 3 | 1967–68, 1968–69, 1969–70 |
| Stantonbury St Peter | 3 | 1912–13, 1913–14, 1938–39 |
| Stewkley | 3 | 1992-93, 2024-25, 2025-26 |
| Bletchley L.M.S. | 2 | 1929–30, 1946–47 |
| Cosgrove St Peter | 2 | 1911–12, 1927–28 |
| Grendon Rangers | 2 | 1973–74, 1974–75 |
| Hanslope | 2 | 1962–63, 1964–65 |
| Middleton Cheney | 2 | 1975–76, 1976–77 |
| PB (Milton Keynes) | 2 | 2006–07, 2007–08 |
| Padbury United | 2 | 1997–98, 1998–99 |
| Steeple Claydon | 2 | 2004–05, 2009–10 |
| Towcester Town | 2 | 1947–48, 1966–67 |
| Winslow United | 2 | 1926–27, 1930–31 |
| Wolverton Town | 2 | 1922–23, 1931–32 |
| Great Horwood | 2 | 2020–21, 2021–22 |
| Stony Stratford | 2 | 1925–26, 2022-23 |
| Buckingham Athletic | 1 | 1984–85 |
| City Colts | 1 | 2013–14 |
| Duston | 1 | 2018–19 |
| Kettering Nomads | 1 | 1989–90 |
| Lavendon Sports | 1 | 2008–09 |
| McCorquodale | 1 | 1977–78 |
| Milton Keynes Wanderers | 1 | 2011–12 |
| Newport Town | 1 | 1982–83 |
| Newport Athletic | 1 | 1996–97 |
| Olney Town | 1 | 1961–62 |
| Salmon Sports | 1 | 1932–33 |
| Shenley & Loughton | 1 | 1988–89 |
| Sherington | 1 | 1972–73 |
| Silverstone British Legion | 1 | 1960–61 |
| Brackley Sports | 1 | 2010–11 |
| MK United | 1 | 2023-24 |

== See also ==
- English football league system
