= Puxley =

Coordinates: 52.0691°N 0.8998°W

- Location within Northamptonshire
- OS grid reference: SP755417
  - London: 50 miles
- Civil parish: Deanshanger
- Unitary authority: West Northamptonshire
- Ceremonial county: Northamptonshire
- Region: East Midlands
- Country: England
- Sovereign state: United Kingdom
- Post town: Towcester
- Postcode district: NN12
- Dialling code: 01908
- Police: Northamptonshire
- Fire: Northamptonshire
- Ambulance: East Midlands
- UK Parliament: Daventry

Puxley is a hamlet in the West Northamptonshire civil parish of Deanshanger. England. It is 6 miles (10 km) west of Milton Keynes

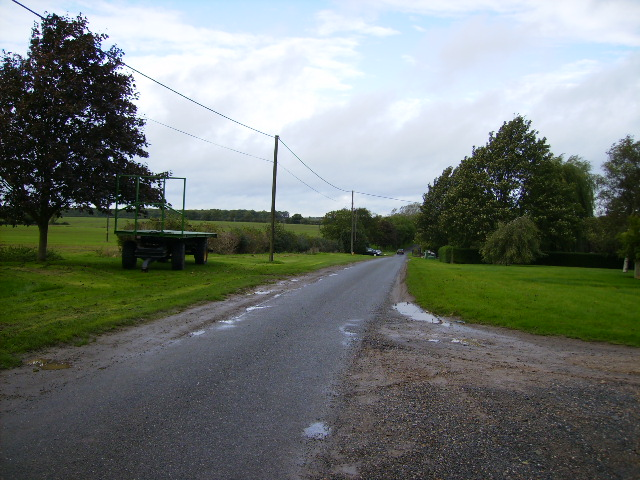
Lane through Puxley photographed October 2006
