= Blisworth =

Village in Northamptonshire, England

Coordinates: 52.175°N 0.937°W

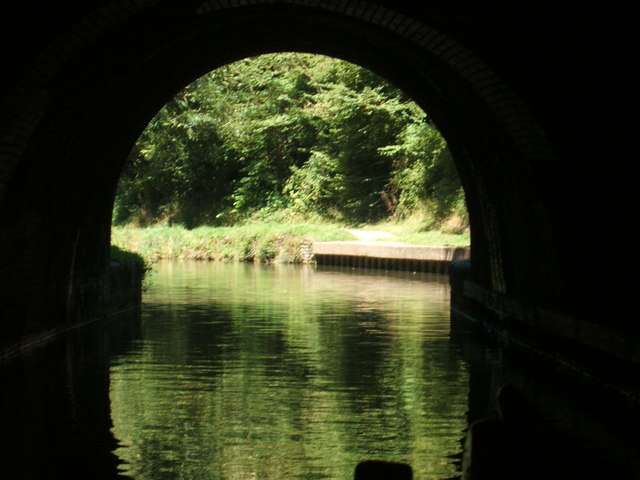
- Blisworth Tunnel on the Grand Union Canal - north entrance from inside the tunnel

- Location within Northamptonshire
- Population: 1,786 (2001 Census); 2,867 (2011 Census)
- OS grid reference: SP727534
  - London: 66 mi (106 km)
- Civil parish: Blisworth
- Unitary authority: West Northamptonshire
- Ceremonial county: Northamptonshire
- Region: East Midlands
- Country: England
- Sovereign state: United Kingdom
- Post town: NORTHAMPTON
- Postcode district: NN7
- Dialling code: 01604
- Police: Northamptonshire
- Fire: Northamptonshire
- Ambulance: East Midlands
- UK Parliament: South Northamptonshire

Blisworth is a village and civil parish in West Northamptonshire, England. The West Coast Main Line, from London Euston to Manchester and Scotland, runs alongside the village partly hidden and partly on an embankment. The Grand Union Canal passes through the village and the north portal of the Blisworth Tunnel is near Stoke Road.

The village's name means 'Blith's enclosure'.

== Location ==
It is about 5 miles (8.0 km) south of Northampton, 4 miles (6.4 km) north of Towcester and 10 miles (16 km) north of Milton Keynes. The M1 motorway junction 15 is about 2 miles (3.2 km) north east.

== Demographics ==
The 1961 census showed a population of 1,192. By the 2001 census there were 1,786 people in the parish (the 2010 estimated population is 1,870), 880 male and 906 female, and 792 dwellings. There are also a few small businesses in and around the village. Just to the north of the village on Northampton Road there is a large derelict site, the location of a former abattoir, a garage and small industrial estate.

=== Administration ===
The local council is currently governed by West Northamptonshire council. Before local government reform in 2021 the local district council was South Northamptonshire Council (SNC) where Blisworth was in Blisworth and Roade ward together with the small hamlet of Courteenhall. The ward elected two members, the last ones being from the Conservative Party. From the 2013 election until its abolition, the parish was in the division of Bugbrook of Northamptonshire County Council (NCC) with one member, who was also Conservative. There is also a local Parish Council with eleven elected members.

The parliamentary constituency was Daventry before the 2010 general election, when the Boundary Commission put the village in the new parliamentary constituency of South Northamptonshire.

== Facilities ==
The village has its own primary school, Blisworth Community Primary School, with around 200 children. The school takes in a number of children from surrounding areas including the southern outskirts of Northampton. The local secondary school is Elizabeth Woodville School with sites in Roade and Deanshanger. Apart from Blisworth, the catchment area includes Collingtree, Hardingstone, Hackleton, Stoke Bruerne and several other villages.

There is a small supermarket/post-office/newsagent, being the only shop. There is a modern well-equipped doctor's surgery in Stoke Road serving several surrounding villages as well as Blisworth itself.

The village has a pub, The Royal Oak. A second pub, The Sun, Moon and Stars, near the canal closed at least 50 years ago. A third pub, the Grafton Arms, is now a private dwelling. After several years of neglect the listed building was the subject of a compulsory purchase order by South Northamptonshire Council in 2007 and may now be restored partly for accommodation and perhaps some community use. There is also a hotel – The Walnut Tree Inn – which was the original Blisworth Station Hotel. It is opposite the site of the former station.

The village has two churches, one Church of England, where the church parish includes Stoke Bruerne and the other a Baptist Chapel. The Baptist Chapel was enlarged in 1871.

Blisworth also has a football club, Blisworth F.C., founded 1898.

There is an annual Canal Festival held in the village every August, held to help celebrate the part that the canal has played in Blisworth's history. This festival is organised by the Blisworth Canal Partnership whose aims are to promote, maintain and improve Blisworth's Canal environment.

== Transport ==
=== Canal ===
The village is the site of the Blisworth Tunnel of the Grand Union Canal and one of the longest on the English canal system. The tunnel runs south to the nearby village of Stoke Bruerne. The canal runs to the south-west side of the village and there is a bridge over it in the village which carries the main road . The bridge is partly original, partly widened, as the main road carried the A43 trunk road until a by-pass was constructed.

=== Roads ===
The A43 (Northampton-Oxford M1 to M40 link road) Milton Malsor and Blisworth by-pass was opened on 21 May 1991. The by-pass runs to the west of the two villages, now following a newly created route from Tiffield. The road joins the M1 London to Yorkshire motorway at a new junction created at that time, 15A, at West Hunsbury, Northampton. From Northampton to Blisworth the by-pass closely follows the trackbed of the Blisworth to Northampton railway, long since closed. The new road makes a slight detour near the Northampton arm of the canal at the 'staircase' of locks near Rothersthorpe. The road's construction followed many years of long campaigns in the two villages.

=== Railways ===
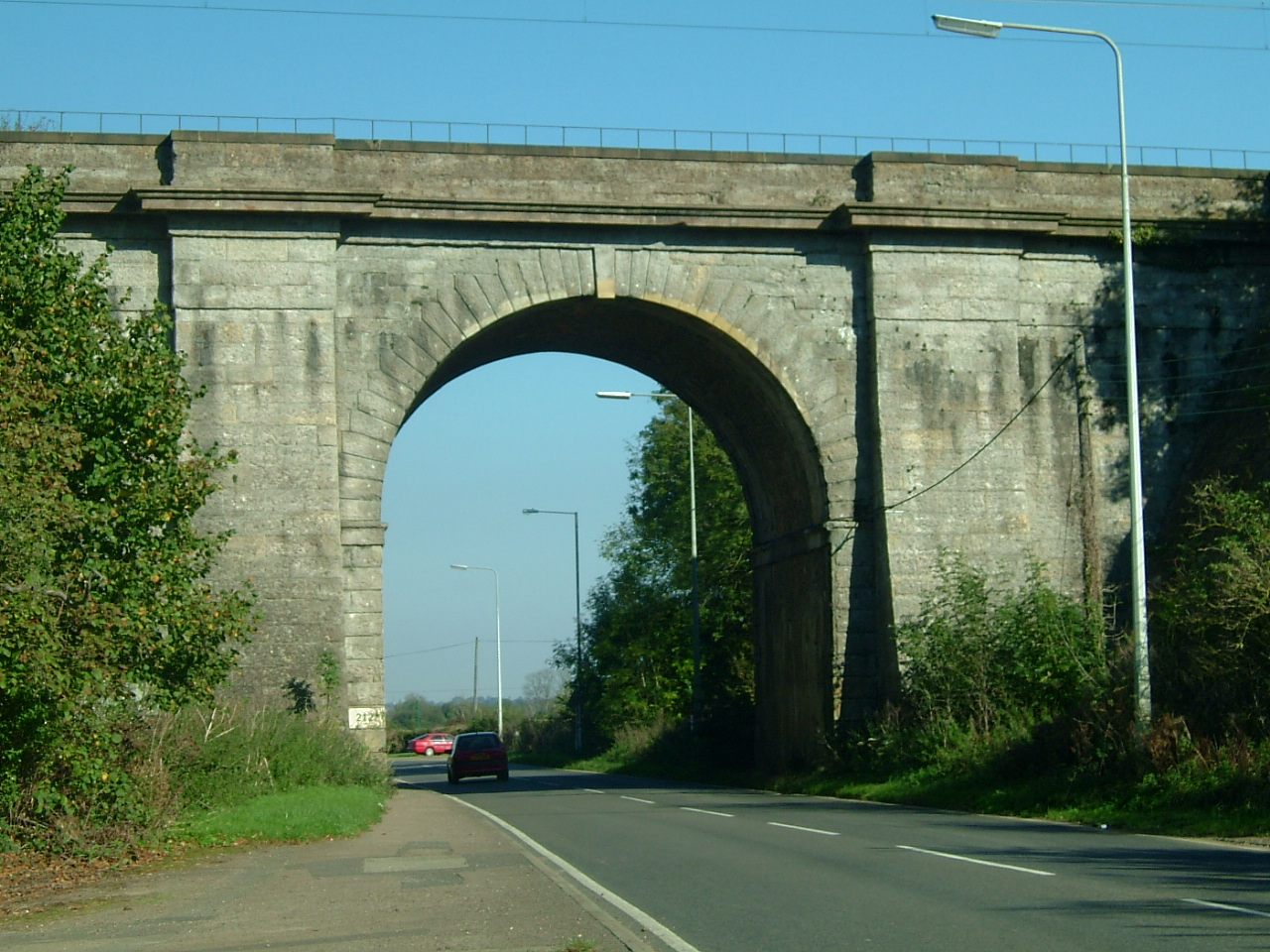
Robert Stephenson's railway arch built 1837-8

The London and Birmingham Railway, under the surveying and construction control of Robert Stephenson, bypassed Northampton and opened a station in Blisworth in 1839. In 1842, after much discussion, Lord Grafton agreed to fund a new station as long as it was a "first class" station - i.e., all trains stopped at it. Ford Lane became Station Road, the location of Blisworth station. In 1845 a branch line on to Peterborough was completed via Northampton, and in 1866 a single-track line was built to Banbury. Blisworth station closed in January 1960 and both branch lines have also long since gone. The main railway line remains. It was electrified in the 1960s and is now part of the West Coast Main Line running 125 mph trains from London Euston to Glasgow. The Northampton Loop of the line leaves the main line at Roade, north of Roade cutting and just south of Blisworth, taking trains on into Northampton and further north to re-join the main line at Rugby. The Stratford-upon-Avon and Midland Junction Railway ran from Blisworth station south to Towcester, Banbury and Stratford upon Avon but closed in the 1960s. Much of the infrastructure such as cuttings and bridges remain along the route.

== Notable buildings ==
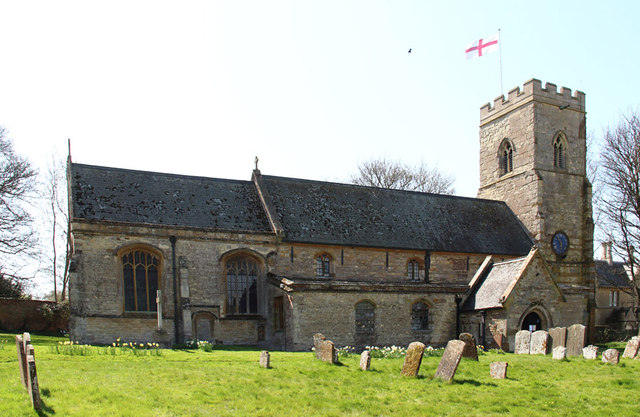
Church of St John the Evangelist

- Blisworth Station Hotel: opposite the site of the former Blisworth station is the former Blisworth Station Hotel, now called the 'Walnut Tree Inn', built by Richard Dunkley for Thomas Shaw, the proprietor of the former Angel Hotel, later Fat Cats Café Bar at 23 Bridge Street in Northampton destroyed by fire in 2011.
- Robert Stephenson's railway bridge, (known as the Blisworth Arch) 1837-8, between Milton Malsor and Blisworth, about 5 miles (8 km) south of Northampton. A viaduct was the original intention.
- Many traditional Northamptonshire local stone cottages, often thatched, and other buildings line the Towcester and Stoke Roads. All, including the following, are private houses for viewing from public roads and paths only:
- Grafton House, Towcester Road (1797)
- Village Hall, Stoke Road. The original school building (rebuilt 1799 after fire)
- Blisworth House, Church Lane (rebuilt 1702)
- Blisworth Stone Works, Stoke Road (c. 1821)
- The Old Toll House, Blisworth Arm (c. 1800)
- Blisworth Mill, Gayton Road. An old steam powered flour mill, built in 1879 by Joseph Westley, now converted into apartments but used over the period 1900 to c. 1985 as a warehouse, a Second World War food storage building, a wine-bottling factory and a spice and herb processing and packaging factory
- Grafton Villas, Northampton Road, near the railway bridge (built 1820)
- Sun, Moon and Stars, Northampton Road, near the canal. A former pub, derelict since ca.1990 and subject of a compulsory purchase order from SNC awaiting sale as of 2012
- The Anglican church of St John the Baptist, as built in the 13th to 15th centuries and was restored in 1856 by Edmund Francis Law. It is a Grade II* listed building.
- The Rectory, west of the church (1841)
- Stoneacres, Stoke Road, C17, "one of the best examples in the county of enthusiastic use of local materials with bands of limestone and sandstone"

== Quarrying ==
During the nineteenth and twentieth centuries, iron ore and limestone were quarried at Blisworth. A limestone quarry began in 1821 north east of the canal tunnel and was connected to a canal wharf at the west end of the tunnel by horse-drawn tramway. The tramway ran from the quarry, across the Stoke Bruerne Road and above the west end of the tunnel. Trains of loaded wagons descended by gravity and empty ones were pulled up by a horse. There was a chute for filling the canal boats from the stone wagons. The quarry was closed in 1912 or 1913.

A trial iron ore quarry operated in 1852, probably close to the east side of the Towcester road. The ore was sent to an ironworks in Staffordshire. The ore was probably taken by horse and cart to the canal for despatch to the ironworks. Quarrying began seriously in 1853 or 1855 to the north of the road to Stoke Bruerne near the west end of the canal tunnel. The quarry was connected to the canal wharf by a tramway worked probably by hand and with a cable worked incline running through a bridge beneath the road and over a wooden bridge over the canal. At the canal, the ore was loaded by hand into canal boats for transport to Staffordshire. This quarry closed in 1855 but was reopened in 1859 closed again in 1861 and reopened in 1863. At this time the ore was taken by horse and cart through the village to be loaded into railway wagons at Blisworth Station. In 1863 however, the tramway was reopened and canal boats took the ore to Blisworth Station for transshipment to railway wagons. Steam cranes were installed at the canal wharf and at the station. The ore was now taken to South Wales. In 1903 the ore was taken by canal to furnaces at Hunsbury, near Northampton later by canal and railway. The iron ore workings were extended northwards and a further quarry opened north of the Courteenhall Road. the tramway was extended to cater for these quarry extensions and was worked by horses upwards and gravity downwards above the incline. These quarries closed in 1921. Part is still visible in some allotments. Part has been filled in and built on. Part has been smoothed over for agriculture. On Courteenhall Road the level of the fields is lower than the road. Traces of the tramway route remain.

Further iron ore quarries were opened to the west of the village in about 1873, operating to the north of the Gayton Road until 1895 and south of the road from 1895 to about 1913. Horse Tramways connected these quarries eastwards to the canal and westwards to the railway. A new quarry operated to the south of these in 1942 and 1943 and between 1954 and 1967. This was the only iron quarry at Blisworth to use mechanical diggers. They were electric and diesel-powered. The quarry was connected by standard gauge steam-operated tramway to sidings on the railway at Gayton south of Blisworth Junction on the line to Towcester. The ore was taken to Scunthorpe and South Wales for smelting. A few traces of all of these quarries remain mainly in the form of depressed field levels and some buildings connected with the later quarry.

Lastly, another limestone quarry was opened near Rectory Farm west of the Towcester Road to provide stone for use in connection with construction of the M1 motorway. This remains and is now a nature reserve.

== Notable people ==
Christian singer-songwriter Graham Kendrick (born 1950) was born at Blisworth.

== Image gallery ==
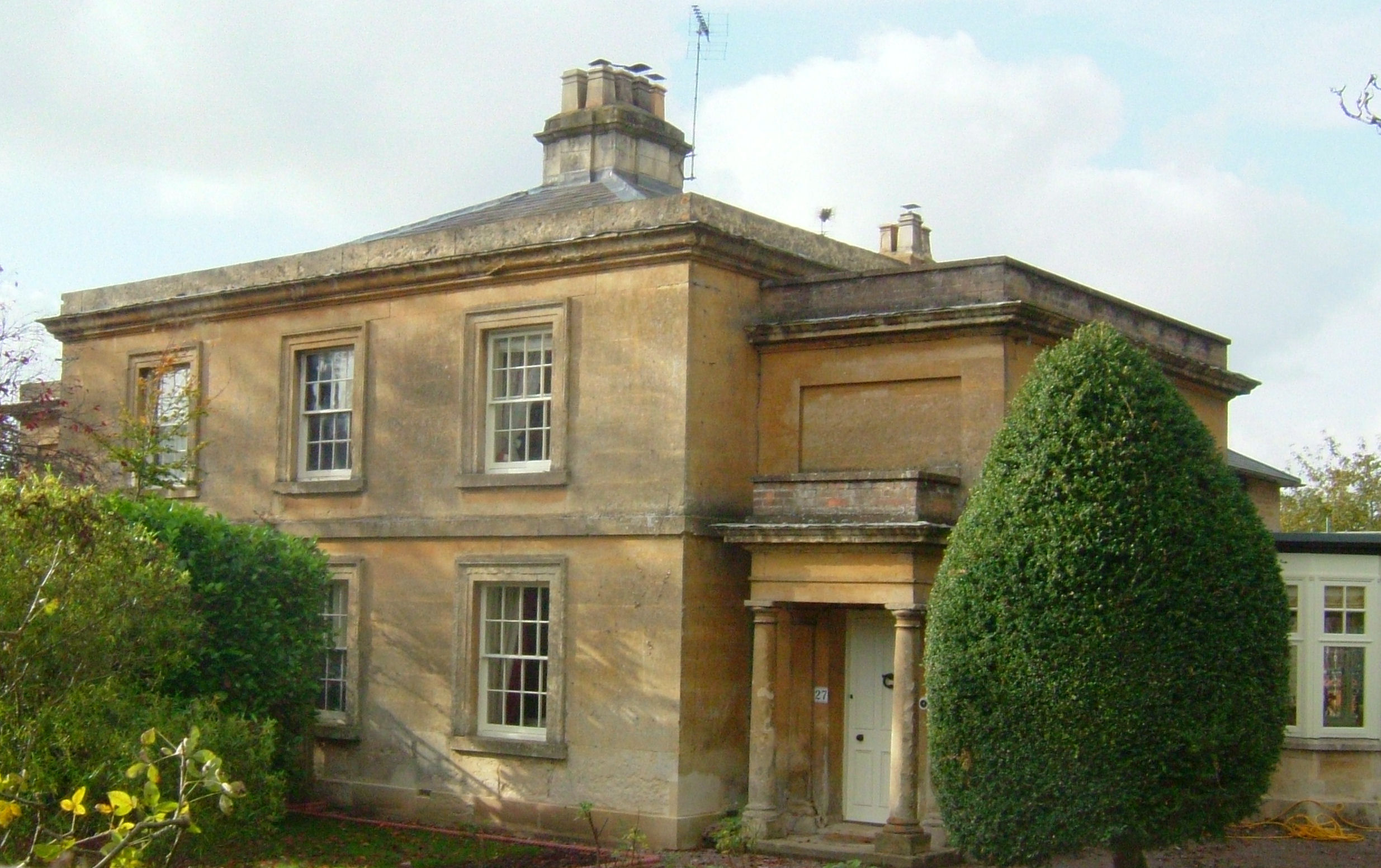
Grafton Villas, Northampton Road, in November 2007

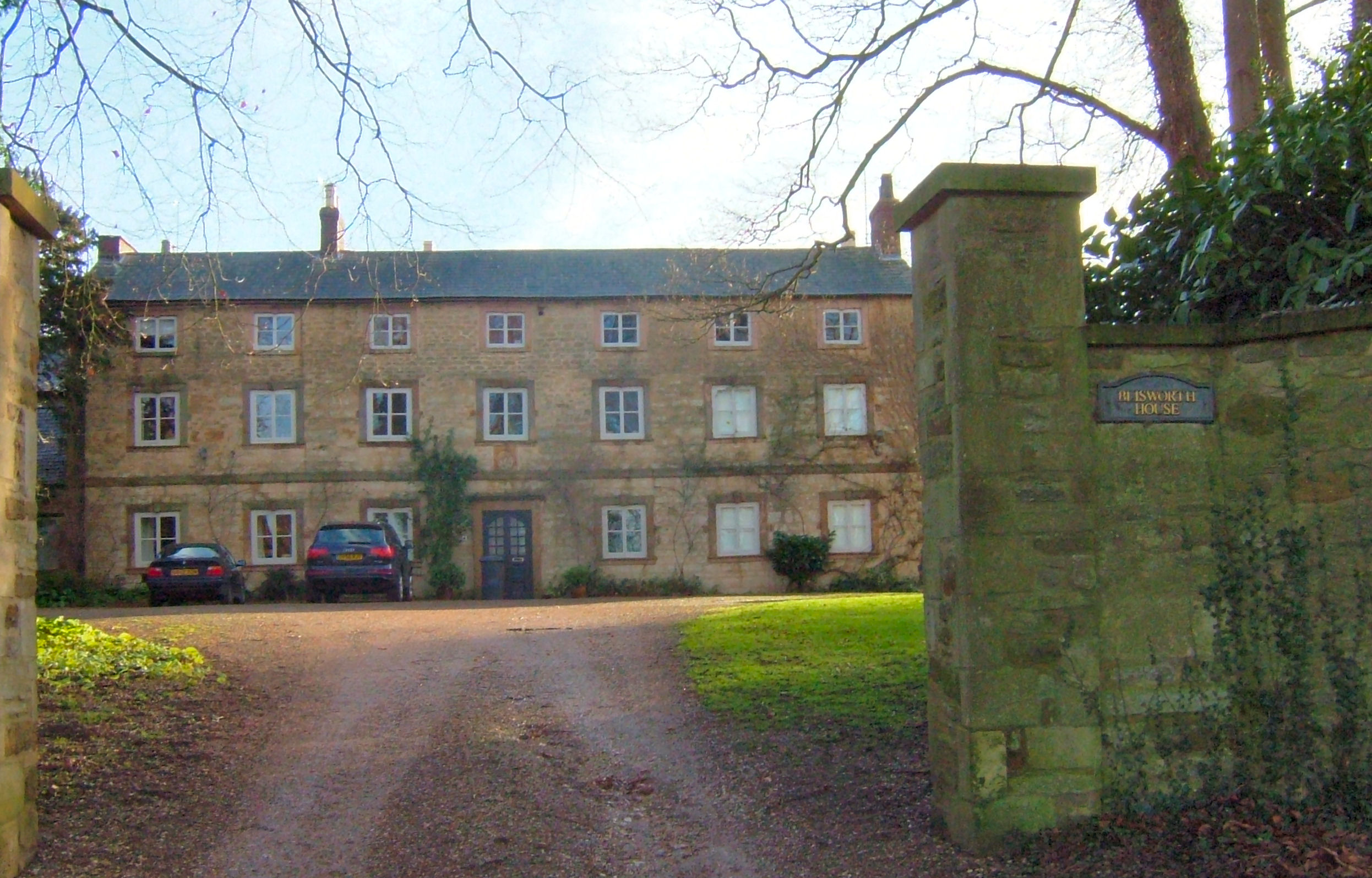
Blisworth House main entrance, in January 2008

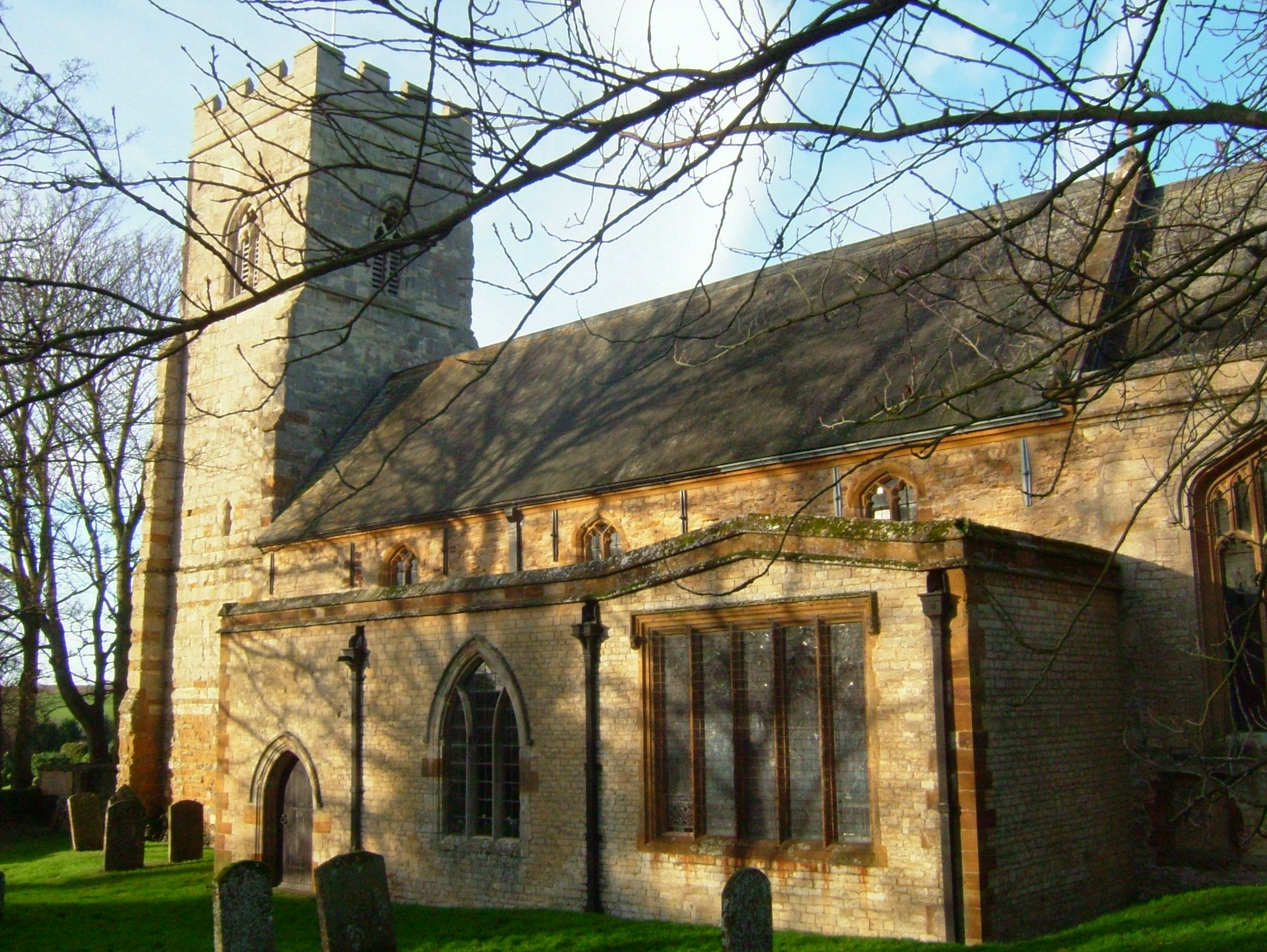
St John the Baptist Church, Blisworth, in January 2008
