= Roade =

Village in West Northamptonshire, England

Coordinates: 52.156°N 0.897°W

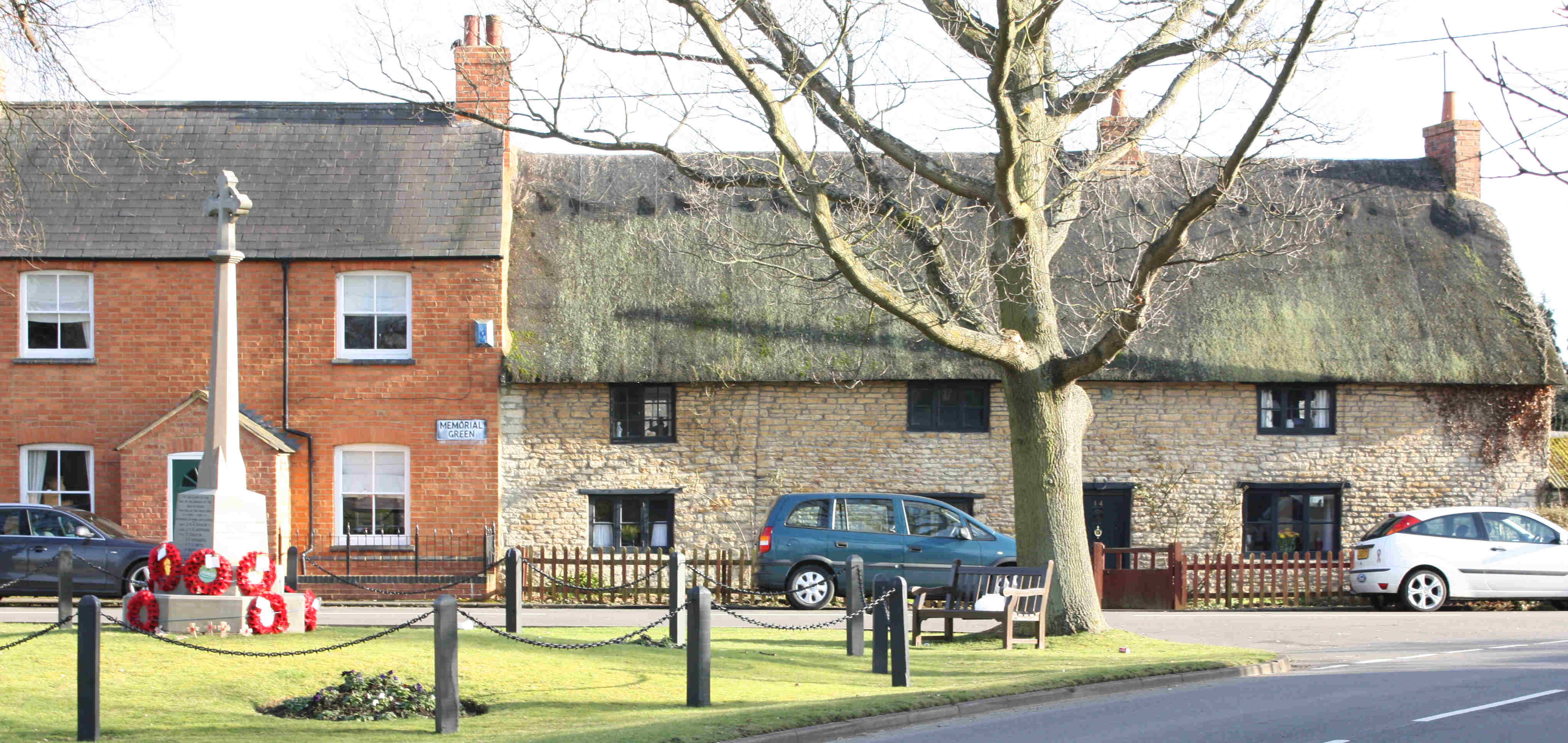
- War Memorial, Memorial Green

- Location within Northamptonshire
- Interactive map of Roade
- Population: 2,254 (2001 census); 2,312 (2011 census).
- OS grid reference: SP755515
  - London: 66 miles (106 km)
- Civil parish: Roade
- Unitary authority: West Northamptonshire
- Ceremonial county: Northamptonshire
- Region: East Midlands
- Country: England
- Sovereign state: United Kingdom
- Post town: NORTHAMPTON
- Postcode district: NN7
- Dialling code: 01604
- Police: Northamptonshire
- Fire: Northamptonshire
- Ambulance: East Midlands
- UK Parliament: South Northamptonshire

Roade is a village and civil parish in Northamptonshire, England.

Roade village has a long medieval history dating as far back as 1066.

The village's name means 'clearing'.

== Location ==
Roade straddles the busy Northampton to Milton Keynes A508, ca. 2 miles (3 km) south of junction 15 of the M1 motorway, 5 miles (8 km) south of Northampton and 12 miles (19 km) north of Milton Keynes. The road bisects the village into the eastern, older part, and the western part, which is mostly 20th-century housing.

== Demographics ==
The 2001 census shows 2,254 people living in the parish, 1,117 male and 1,137 female, in 962 dwellings. In 2011 the population had increased to 2,312.

== Governance ==
The parish is in the West Northamptonshire unitary authority area, in the two-member Blisworth and Roade ward.

== West Coast Main Line ==
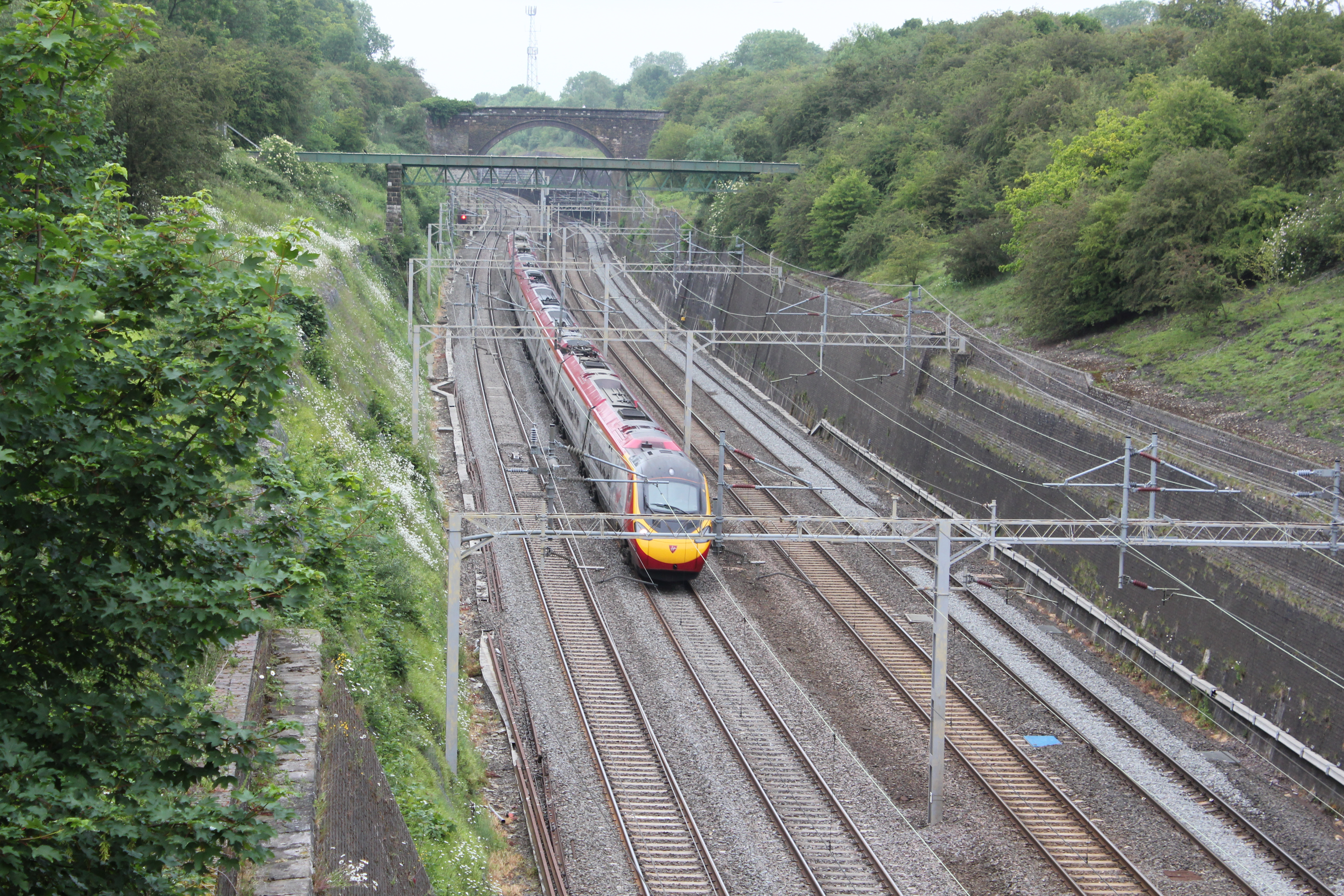
Roade cutting looking north from a pedestrian bridge with a Virgin Trains Pendolino travelling south on the fast lines with the Northampton loop lines on the right

Four tracks of the West Coast Main Line from London Euston to Manchester and Scotland go through the village in a deep cutting. The cutting bisects the village into the older part on the east side and the more recent west side. However, there are two main road bridges and four others for pedestrians, some for minor traffic and farm vehicles. The line dates from 1838 and was electrified in the 1960s.

The cutting is a geological Site of Special Scientific Interest (SSSI) listed by English Nature.

Roade railway station was situated at the southern end of the village and the cutting, but closed in 1964. The four lines split at the north end of the cutting, with the two 'slow' lines forming the slower Northampton loop via Northampton and Long Buckby, and the other two 'fast' lines heading directly north via Rugby. There was a campaign in the 1990s to have the station re-opened for commuter traffic to London, Milton Keynes and Northampton, but there are no current plans to do so.

=== 1969 rail accident ===
An accident occurred at the northern end of the cutting, at the junction, on 31 December 1969 when a northbound goods train on the slow lines derailed. A southbound passenger train from Northampton was passing at the time at about 75 mph and collided with the derailed wagons and was partly derailed itself. The driver of the passenger train was killed. The cause of the derailment was the failure of a main bearing spring on an empty 16-ton mineral wagon, and very similar to a previous incident on the Northampton loop in 1967.

== Facilities ==
The local secondary school, Elizabeth Woodville School is the one of two Sports Colleges in Northamptonshire, the other being Kingsthorpe College. The school is on the A508 Stratford road at the south-west end of the village and has around 1,150 pupils. The catchment area extends to Grange Park, Blisworth, Stoke Bruerne and several other villages in the area. The school opened in 1956 as Roade Secondary Modern School changing to a Comprehensive School in 1975. The School merged with Kingsbrook Business and Enterprise school in Deanshanger in September 2011. The merged school was renamed Elizabeth Woodville School. Woodville was born in Grafton Regis which is halfway between the two schools and was Queen consort of King Edward IV.

Roade Primary School in Hartwell Road has about 166 pupils and the original school was built in 1876.

There is a main post office in the High Street offering most services including the payment of Vehicle Excise Duty.

The village pub is The Cock Inn, at the junction of the High Street with Hartwell Road.

The village has its own football team who play in the Premier Division of the Northamptonshire Combination Football League, known as Roade FC.

== Notable people ==
- Bernard Donoughue (born 1934), Labour Party politician
- Glenys Kinnock (1944–2023), Labour Party politician, was born in Roade
- David Capel (1963-2020), cricketer
- Joe Stockdale (born 1999) equestrian

== Freedom of the Parish ==
The following people and military units have received the Freedom of the Parish of Roade.

=== Individuals ===
- Cecil Bottomley: 8 May 2014.
- Shamsher "Sam" Chatur: 19 November 2022.
- Nilufa "Lucy" Chatur: 19 November 2022.
- William John McLaren Marshall: 26 November 2022.
