= Weedon Bec =

Village in Northamptonshire, England

Coordinates: 52.23101°N 1.08045°W

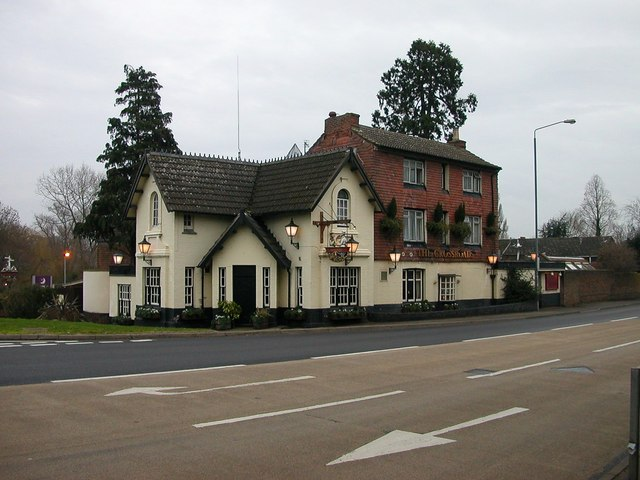
- The Crossroads public house

- Location within Northamptonshire
- Population: 2,706 (2011 Census)
- OS grid reference: SP629596
  - London: 68 miles (109 km)
- Civil parish: Weedon Bec
- Unitary authority: West Northamptonshire
- Ceremonial county: Northamptonshire
- Region: East Midlands
- Country: England
- Sovereign state: United Kingdom
- Post town: NORTHAMPTON
- Postcode district: NN7
- Dialling code: 01327
- Police: Northamptonshire
- Fire: Northamptonshire
- Ambulance: East Midlands
- UK Parliament: Daventry

Weedon Bec, usually just Weedon, is a village and civil parish in West Northamptonshire, England. It is close to the source of the River Nene. The population of the civil parish at the 2011 Census was 2,706.

== Geography ==
Weedon is around 4 miles (6.4 km) southeast of Daventry, 7 miles (11.3 km) west of Northampton. It was at the crossroads of the A5 and former A45 until a bypass opened on 15 November 2018. The Grand Union Canal (1796) and West Coast Main Line both pass through the village.

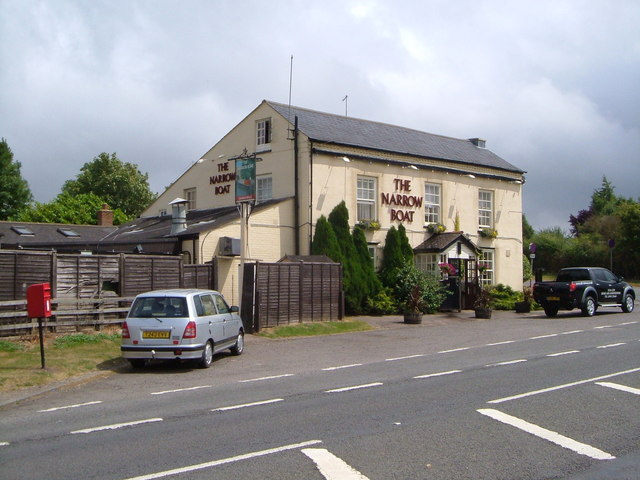
Narrow Boat public house

Lower Weedon and Upper Weedon are to the south. The northern boundary of the village follows the old A45 to the west, then south to just outside Everdon. It skirts Everdon Wood and Everdon Stubbs, and borders Stowe Nine Churches to the southeast, and lies to a short distance east of the A5 up to the A45, next to Flore parish.

=== Demographics ===
The 2001 census the village had a population of 2,485, 1,248 male and 1,237 female, 1,237 households and average age 38.34 years. The population at the 2011 Census was 2,706.

== History ==
The village's name comes from the Old English Wēo-dūn meaning 'heathen temple hill'. Just to the south of the parish is the 162 metres (531 ft) Weedon Hill: this may be the hill in question. In the Domesday Book of 1086, the village is named 'Wedone' and located in the ancient hundred of Gravesend. In the 12th century, lordship of the village was granted to the monks of the abbey of Le Bec-Hellouin in Normandy. The 'Bec' part of the name 'Weedon Bec' is derived from the Abbey of Bec-Hellouin in Normandy, France, which owned most of the village until the dissolution of the monasteries, when King Henry VIII granted the village to Eton College.

By the mid-12th century, Gravesend Hundred had been absorbed into Fawsley Hundred, The Fawsley Hundred was disused in the late 19th century as other administrative units superseded its functions, although it continued to appear on early 20th century censuses for statistical purposes. The ancillary villages of Lower Weedon and Upper Weedon formed south of Weedon Bec.

The settlement along the A5, the Roman road called Watling Street, was known as 'Road Weedon' and earlier 'Weedon on the Street'. To avoid confusion with the village of Weedon Lois, the complete village name 'Weedon Bec' is used in many circumstances. The village is usually locally nicknamed 'Weedon' (closer to its ancient name) when including 'Lower Weedon' and 'Upper Weedon' with old 'Weedon Bec', which were three distinct villages now merged into one. The settlement patterns of the three villages have been distorted by the presence of the major road, canal, military establishments and railway station and present an unusual example of urban sprawl in an otherwise rural part of England.

=== Experiments with radar in 1935 ===
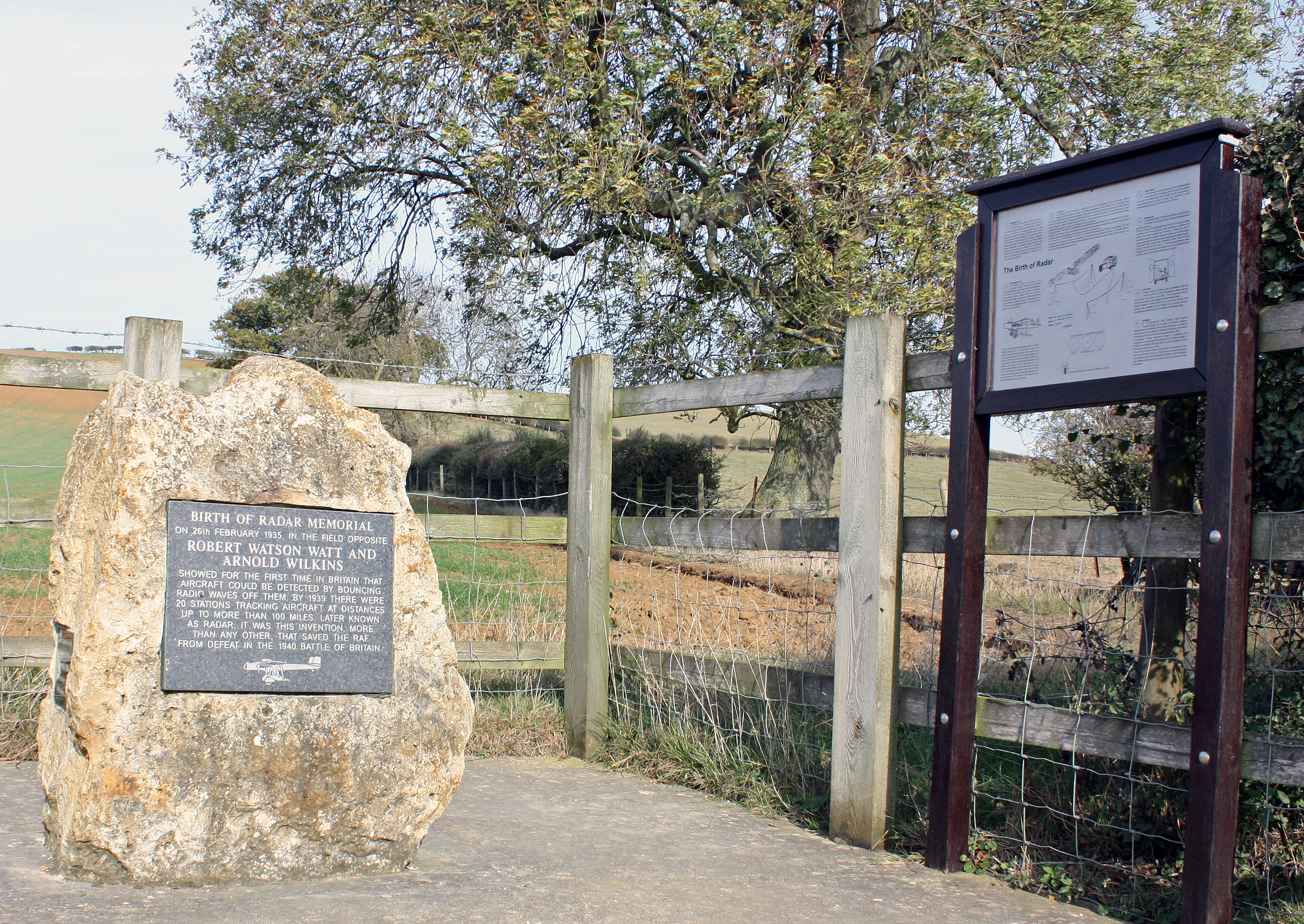
Radar memorial on the road between the A5 and Litchborough south of Weedon Bec

Arnold Frederic Wilkins demonstrated radar, from radio waves from the Borough Hill transmitter on 26 February 1935. It is often stated as taking place near Weedon Bec, but actually took place in a field just off the A5, towards Litchborough, in the parish of Stowe Nine Churches (Upper Stowe).

A memorial to the event is located off the A5 just south of Weedon on the Litchborough Road (NGR SP650557).

On 26 February 2010, the event was re-enacted 75 years after the event by radio amateurs from the Coventry Amateur Radio Society and the Northampton Radio Club. A working RADAR set was constructed using the two-metre amateur radio band. As with the original experiment the source signal was transmitted from Borough Hill in Daventry. The four target aircraft were flown by pilots with amateur radio licences.

=== Weedon rail crashes ===
Weedon has been the site of two serious rail crashes in 1915 and 1951 in which a total of 25 people were killed.

=== Churches ===
The parish church, St Peter and St Paul's, is at the south of the village, overlooked from both the Grand Union Canal embankment and the West Coast Main Line viaduct. According to Pevsner, it has a Norman west tower, with the main body of 1825 (chancel rebuilt in 1863 by Edmund Francis Law). This church is a Grade II* listed building. There is a United Reformed Church (former Congregational Chapel) of 1792: this is also a listed building, Grade II.

Richard Bate was named as the vicar of "Wedon Beke", in 1452.

=== Weedon Bec Primary School ===
Weedon Bec Primary school on West Street and is part of Innovate Multi Academy Trust with Badby, Kilsby and Woodford Halse Primary School.

=== Other buildings ===
The Priory in Oak Street is all that remains of a larger house. The Firs on Queen Street is a house dated 1692.

At the crossroads there are a number of pubs, cafés and shops. It is now growing as a centre for the antique trade and more specialist shops.

=== Ordnance depot ===
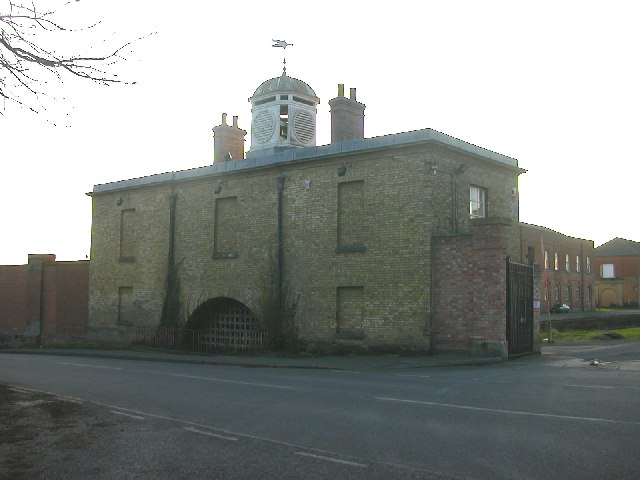
Ordnance depot: former canal gateway

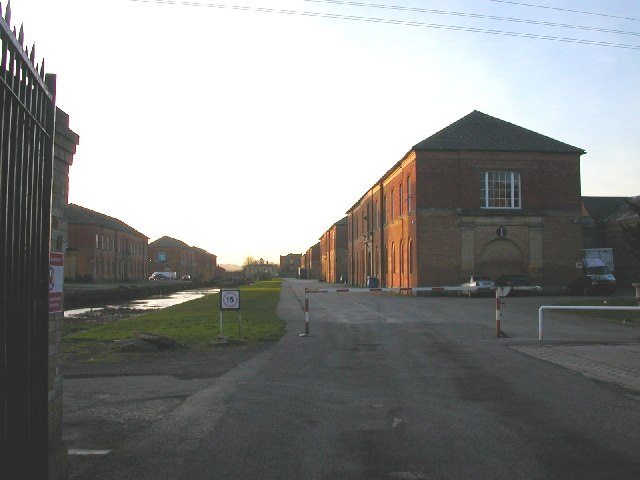
Ordnance buildings flanking the canal arm

Next to the canal is the former Napoleonic War era Military Ordnance Depot, established by Act of Parliament in 1803, as part of the British anti-invasion preparations of 1803–05. Designed by Colonel Pilkington of the Royal Engineers, the depot was largely built between 1805 and 1806. It was the central small arms depot for the British Army and was originally served by a branch off the canal that entered through a portcullis. When the railway was built, it also had a branch into the depot.

The depot had eight large storehouses built either side of the central canal and was surrounded by a high stone wall. The upper floors were used for storage of small arms and the ground floors for larger items such as field artillery. There were canal gatehouses at each end of the precinct; beyond which, at a safe distance, the canal entered a further walled area, gated at either end, which contained a row of four gunpowder magazines, each separated from the next by a 'blast house' filled with earth as a precaution against explosions. Later, another magazine was added as was a large clothing store between the precincts in 1902. All the buildings survive and together with the enclosure walls are listed Grade II*.

There was a barracks in the village, holding a standing battalion, a troop of cavalry and a troop of horse artillery. The barracks were demolished in the 1950s. Three large pavilions were built between the depot and barracks to house senior civilian officers of the depot. These were demolished in the 1970s. Next door to the barracks was the Army School of Equitation, also demolished in the 1960s. The depot became redundant in 1965 and was sold by the Ministry of Defence in 1984. It is now used for storage, office accommodation and light industry.

Ordnance Depot Ltd is working with volunteers to interpret the site’s history and in 2018 a visitor centre was opened in the Eastern Gatehouse. The project received a £66,300 grant from the Heritage Lottery Fund.

=== Fire Services National Museum ===
The Fire Services National Museum collection was stored at the former ordnance depot and the trust had been working for many years to secure planning approval for the museum to be an integral part of the depot's redevelopment as an out-of-town shopping centre. Following its rejection in 2017 the collection was moved to Hampshire.

== Transport ==
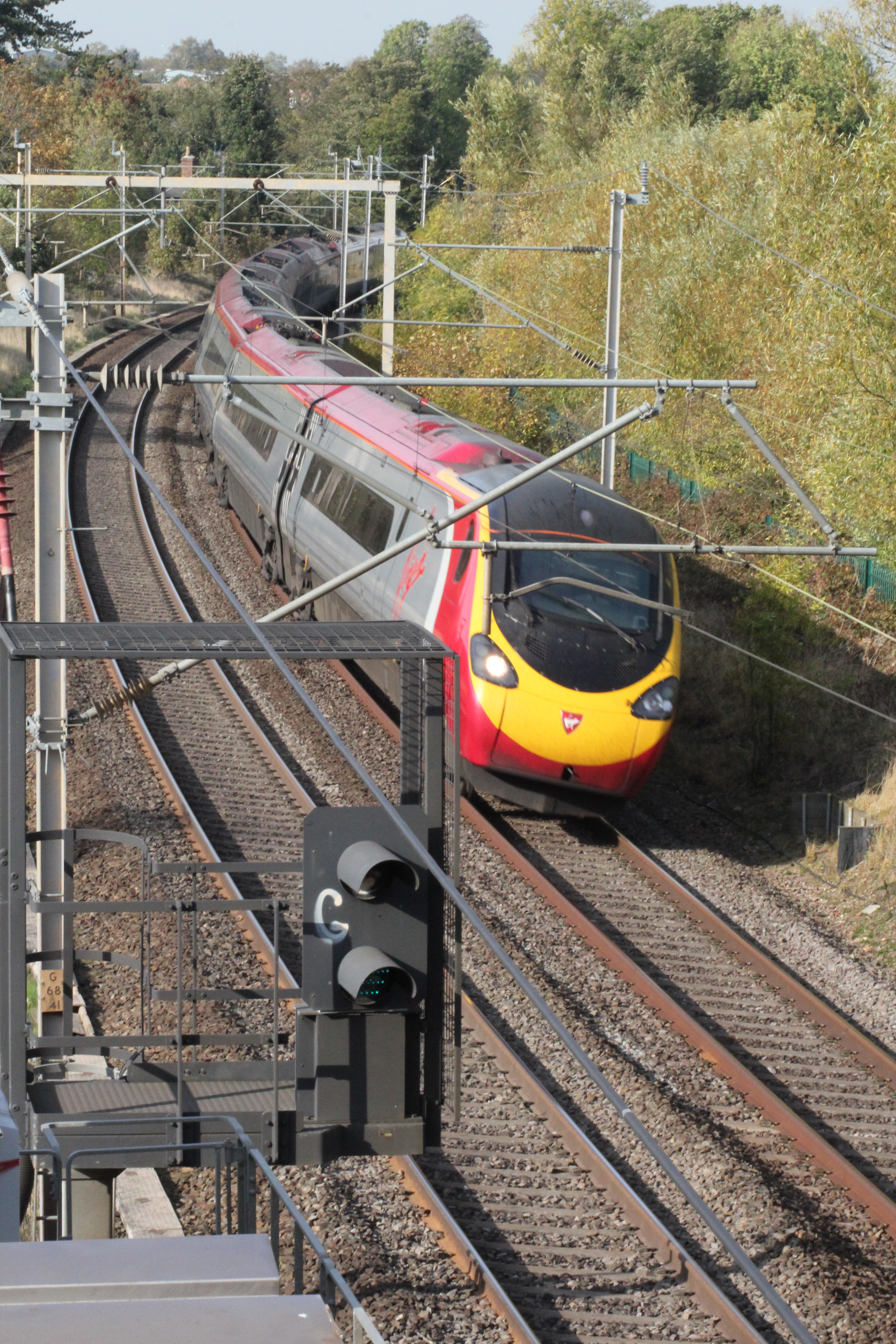
Southbound Virgin Trains Pendolino tilts through the last bend just south of Weedon, about to enter Stowe Hill Tunnel, about 40 minutes to Euston Station, London

The village is served by three bus routes, all operated by Stagecoach Midlands. The D1 and D2 run between Daventry and Northampton, and the D3 also runs between Daventry and Northampton, although it runs through the centre of the village instead of the High Street. Most of the bus stops have bus shelters.

The village is near the junction of the A45 and A5 and is on the Grand Union Canal.

The West Coast Main Line crosses the eastern edge of the village. Stowe Hill Tunnel is just to the south-east of the village and Weedon Viaduct carries the railway across Church Street and the River Nene. Until the 1960s, Weedon had its own station on the fast lines of the West Coast Main Line, just north of the A45 road bridge. Between 1888 and 1963 there was a railway branch line from just north of Weedon to Leamington Spa via Daventry.

'Sustainable Transport Midlands' (a private body) is campaigning for a parkway station in Weedon to serve Daventry (in addition to Long Buckby). In an interview with BBC News, Councillor Phil Larratt, West Northamptonshire Council cabinet member for Transport said 'West Northamptonshire Council supported new stations and a new facility at Weedon could "serve all the villages and communities between Daventry, Northampton and Towcester".'

== Notable residents ==
- Leo G. Carroll (1886–1972), actor (The Paradine Case, North by Northwest and others), was born in Weedon Bec.
- Patrick Leigh Fermor (1915–2011), writer, spent his first four years in Road Weedon.
- Tom MacRae (1980–present), writer, "Rise of the Cybermen", "The Age of Steel" and several other Doctor Who episodes. McRae also wrote the series Threesome. Born and raised in Weedon Bec.
