= Alderton, Northamptonshire =

Village in Northamptonshire, England

Coordinates: 52°06′56″N 00°55′10″W

Alderton
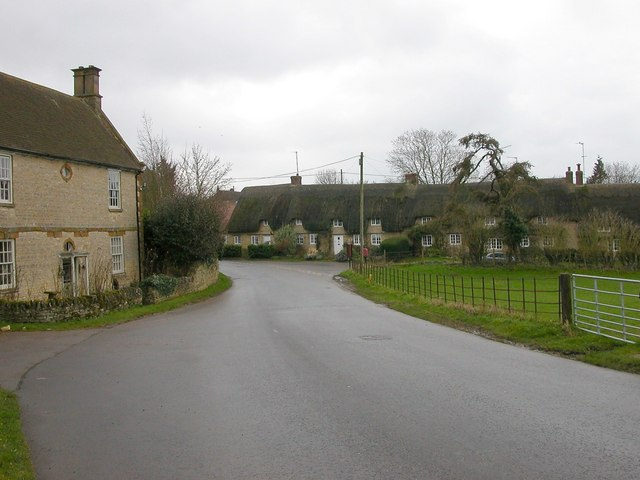
- Alderton

- Location within Northamptonshire
- Population: 248 (with Grafton Regis); 2010 est.109 (Alderton)
- OS grid reference: SP7446
  - London: 62 miles (100 km)
- Civil parish: Alderton
- Unitary authority: West Northamptonshire
- Ceremonial county: Northamptonshire
- Region: East Midlands
- Country: England
- Sovereign state: United Kingdom
- Post town: TOWCESTER
- Postcode district: NN12
- Dialling code: 01327
- Police: Northamptonshire
- Fire: Northamptonshire
- Ambulance: East Midlands
- UK Parliament: Current: Northampton South; from next General election: South Northamptonshire

Alderton is a small village and civil parish in West Northamptonshire, England. The village is about 3 miles (5 km) southeast of Towcester, 9 miles (14 km) south of Northampton, and 10 miles (16 km) northwest of Milton Keynes, along a road between the A5 and A508 main roads. The village is famous for the remains of an English Heritage Scheduled Ancient Monument, a Norman Castle, known locally as "The Mount", which was the subject of an investigation by the Channel 4 programme Time Team.

== Demographics ==
The 2001 census data is grouped with the nearby village of Grafton Regis and showed there were 248 people living in both villages, 134 male, 114 female, in 94 dwellings. The majority of these being in Grafton Regis. In 2009 the estimated population of Alderton itself was 109. At the 2011 census the population continued to be included in the civil parish of Grafton Regis

== Governance ==
The parish was merged with Grafton Regis in 1935. An independent Parish Council for the village was re-established on 1 April 2004.

The local council is West Northamptonshire but was South Northamptonshire and Alderton is in the area of Northamptonshire County Council. until local government reform in 2021.

== Geography ==
Alderton is on the southern ridge of the valley of the River Tove which flows east between the village and Stoke Bruerne to the north. Stoke Bruerne church and Stoke Park Pavilions are clearly visible in the distance.

== History ==
The villages name means 'Farm/settlement connected with Ealdhere'.

There is evidence of settlement at Alderton in the Iron Age. Later the Romans built major roads including Watling Street, the A5, only 0.5 miles (0.8 km) southwest of the village. Domestic Roman artefacts have been found and large villas and farming communities were established nearby. The nearest known Roman villa was the Piddington Roman Villa at the village of Piddington, about 6 miles (10 km) away. Iron Age, Roman and Saxon artefacts have been found on The Mount.

Alderton became a larger Saxon settlement and a Saxon burh is thought to have stood on the high ground and would have included the Mount site. The village lies on what was the frontier between the Saxon kingdoms of the south and the Danelaw in the north.

The 1066 Norman Conquest saw the development of the ringwork castle in the form visible today. This was one of the strongholds owned by Robert, Count of Mortain the half brother of William the Conqueror. It was an imposing earthwork hastily constructed to form part of the defence William's new kingdom. Twenty years later, the Domesday Book entry for Alderton shows the name as "Aldrintone" and the Earl of Ferrers as the local lord and lists land for 8 ploughs.

Recent archaeological research points to the castle being abandoned in the latter half of the 14th century. This was at the time of the Black Death when there appears to have been a sharp reduction in the local population as elsewhere in Britain. Alderton came under the control of the Manor of Stoke Bruerne.

Alderton was a very small community throughout the 14th and 15th centuries. By 1541 King Henry VIII had included the village within the Honour of Grafton. The village population grew in the latter half of the 16th century with the arrival of William Gorges, a nobleman from a distinguished aristocratic line. Gorges built a very large mansion house with landscaped gardens. Through the marriage of Gorges' daughter Frances to Thomas Hesilrige, the Manor House passed to the Heselrige family.

In August 1605, the Queen, Anne of Denmark stayed at Alderton Manor, and she came again in August 1608, when she wore a white satin gown with silver buttons. She rewarded musicians who played for her on 18 August. At this time King James I knighted Thomas Hesilrige at Grafton. He later became a baronet. Hesilrige's son Sir Arthur Hesilrige, 2nd Baronet, a close ally of John Pym and Oliver Cromwell and one of the Five Members, was Lord of the Manor in 1655.

By the early 18th century the village was a thriving agricultural community. The Manor House was demolished and its site was occupied by a substantial farm, known as Manor Farm. The village population remained small and largely involved in agriculture. Recently, it has changed character and is now a dormitory settlement for professional people; it is also a conservation area.

== Historic buildings and structures ==
The Mound in Alderton.

=== The Mount ===
This is the remains of a ringwork castle which is now overgrown with trees. The earthworks are still in a

good state of preservation and comprise an area of about 2 acres (8,100 m^{2}). The ditch is 5 metres deep in parts and still fully accessible. The internal area of the castle has some slightly raised areas interpreted as building platforms.

The castle and Manor of Alderton were sold by Thomas le Sauvage to Pagan de Chaworth during the reign of Edward I. During the first English Civil War there were a number of engagements in the vicinity, most notably the siege and eventual destruction of Grafton Manor House in 1644. Parliamentarian forces involved in this action passed through Alderton. There is little evidence of any significant use of the castle at this time, however. Some civil war musket balls have been discovered but may be associated with musket practice. Certainly it is documented that during the 18th century the site was used as a gentlemen's rifling range.

During the Victorian era the castle appears to have been a popular picnic spot, judging by the recent porcelain and glass finds. This use as a village amenity has continued to the present day. In 1998 Derek Batten, a resident of the neighbouring village of Paulerspury and former County Councillor, purchased the castle site.

=== Time Team visit ===
As The Mount is a scheduled ancient monument, ordinarily Channel 4's archaeological television programme Time Team would not have been given permission to excavate the site. Because so little is known about it, however – and about this type of castle in general – English Heritage did on this occasion grant permission for a dig in three specific areas. One of these was in the ditch surrounding the castle; one on the ramparts; and one inside the castle. The aim, according to Glyn Coppack, the English Heritage inspector with responsibility for the excavation, was to obtain 'the maximum amount of information for the minimum disturbance of the site'. The programme was broadcast on 14 January 2001 and is summarised on the Time Team website.

=== Medieval Castle ===
In August 2009, archaeologists uncovered what they believed were remains of the only medieval stone castle in South Northamptonshire, after they picked up where Time Team's archaeologists left off eight years before.

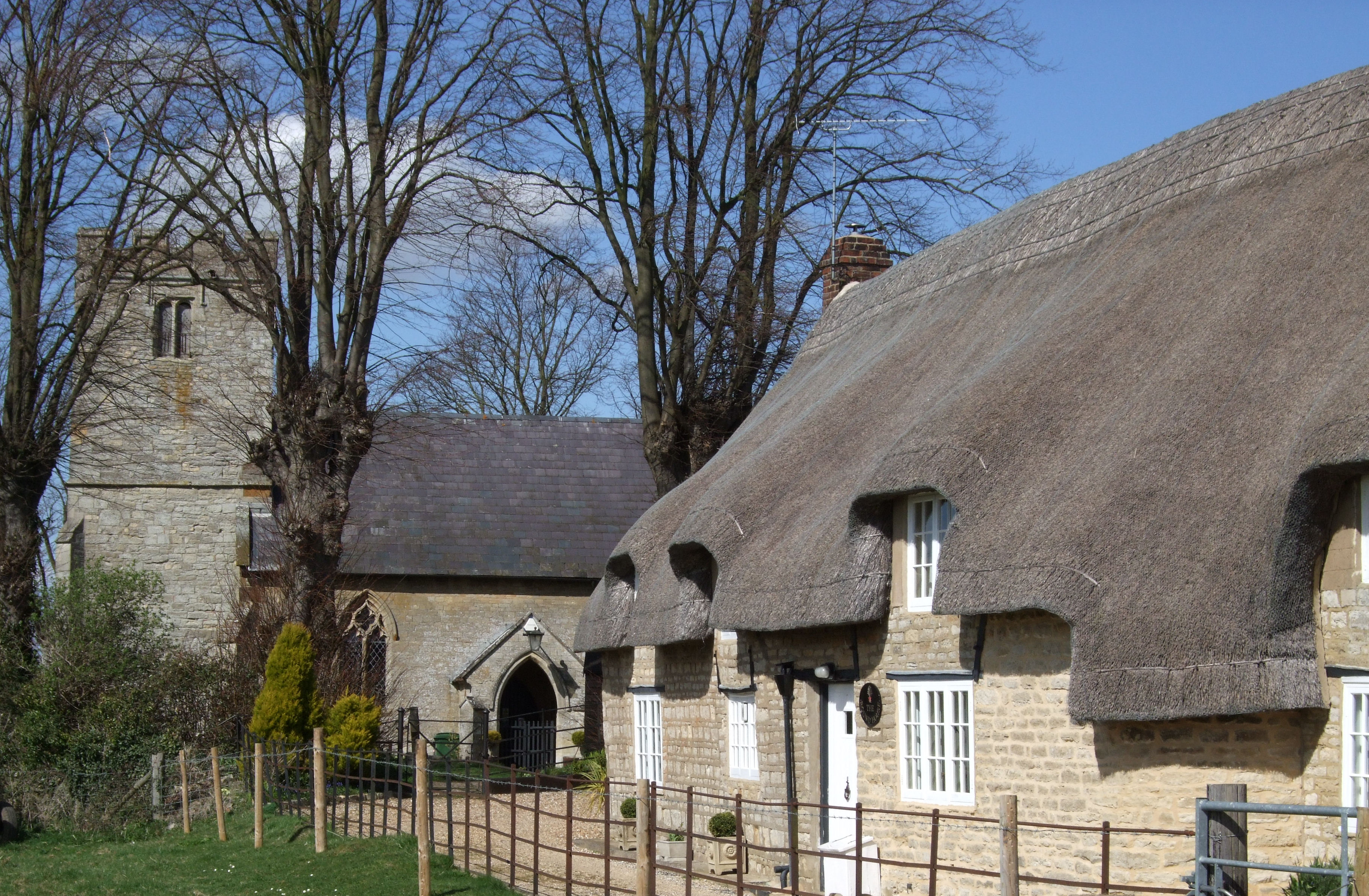
Alderton Church of St Margaret

=== Church of St Margaret ===
The building dates from 1522–1528 and later 1848. There is a monument to Sir William de Combermartin (d. ca. 1318).

=== Manor House ===
The building dates from 1695.

== Notable residents ==
Sir Arthur Hesilrige, of Alderton, was one of the five MPs impeached by King Charles I in 1642.
