= Stoke Park Pavilions =

Coordinates: 52.1321°N 0.9191°W

Stoke Park Pavilions are all that remain of the stately house and grounds of Stoke Park near the village of Stoke Bruerne, Northamptonshire, England, approximately 8 miles (13 km) south of Northampton and 11 miles (18 km) north of Milton Keynes.

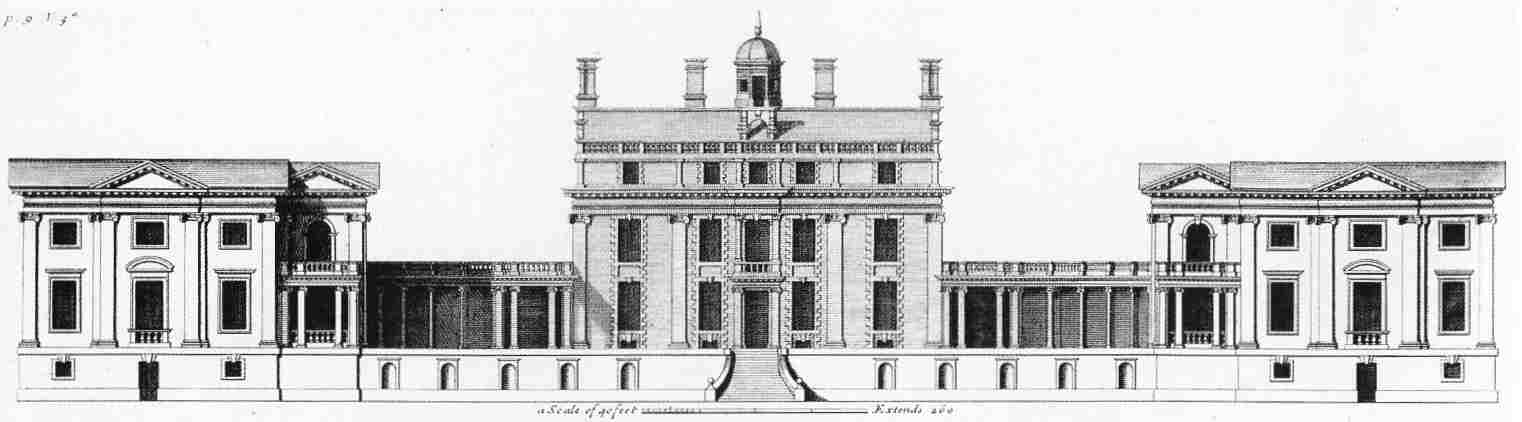
Stoke Park: the house ca.1700 ss pictured in Colen Campbell's Vitruvius Britannicus (meaning British Architect).

== Stoke Park ==
Stoke Park is listed grade II in English Heritage's Register of Parks and Gardens of Special Historic Interest in England and contains two listed buildings, the pavilions, of 'outstanding architectural or historic interest' . Surrounding farmland contains areas of late parliamentary enclosure, ridge and furrow earthworks and four model farms built by the 4th Duke of Grafton c. 1840. The pavilions are the two wings of the former stately house, east and west. The house is long since gone but the pavilions remain as fine examples of the Palladian style.

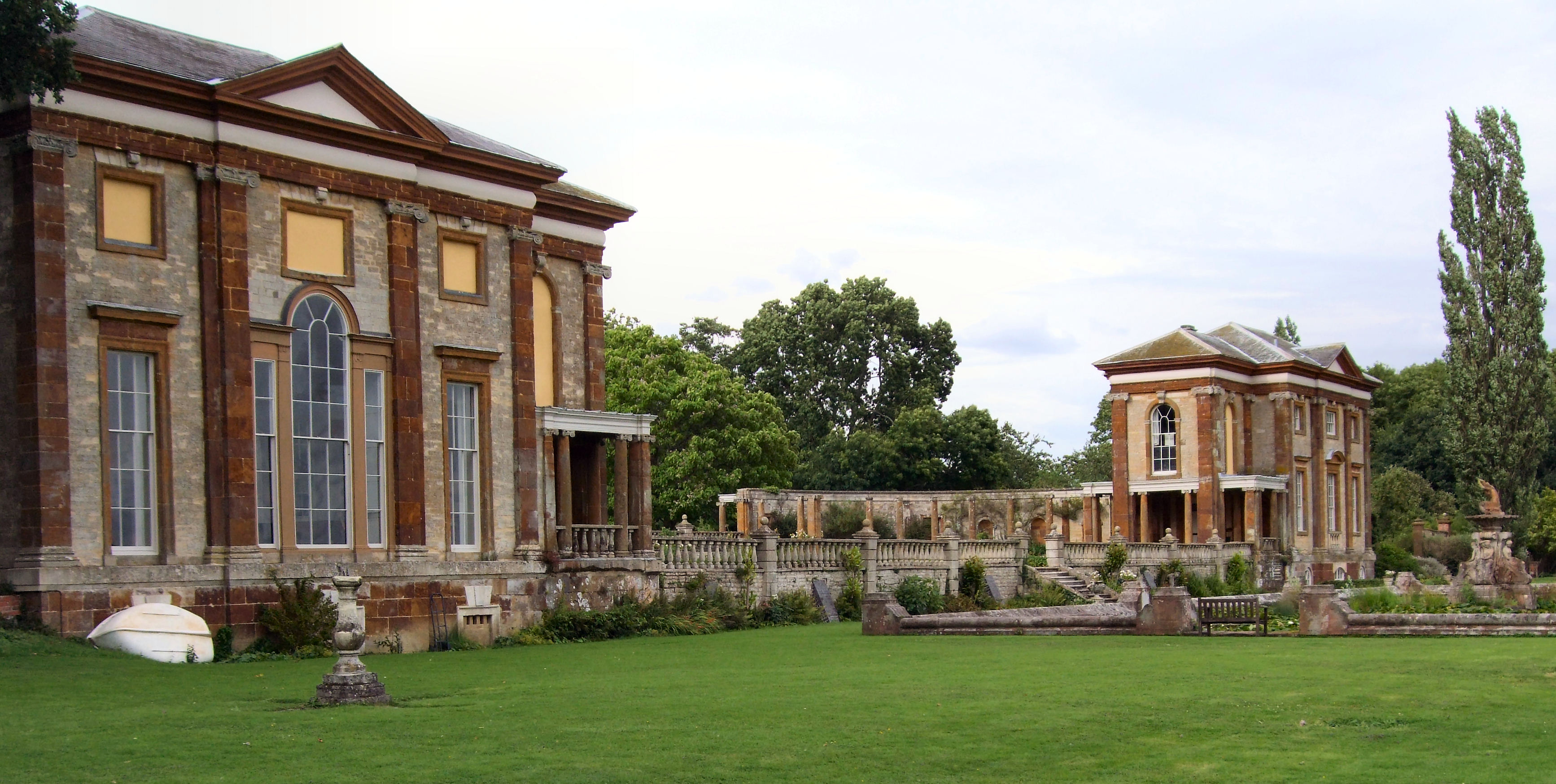
Stoke Park pavilions from the garden Stoke Bruerne looking northwest in 2008

Although formerly a single landholding, the park has now been divided between several properties, which include a large area of farmland, as well as a number of private residences accommodated within several converted farm and estate buildings as well as the remaining pavilions of the great house of Stoke Park. Access to the park is restricted. One footpath, which runs from the village at the bottom of Bridge Road, crosses the farmland to the south west of the village, and runs through the park and then continues to Alderton to the south west. Stoke Park Lane runs southwards from Shutlanger Road, through the farmland to the park, passing through Stoke Park Woods and approaches the group of buildings surrounding the pavilions at the heart of the Park.

Stoke Park preserves the remains of a formal designed landscape, built on a late medieval hunting park. Much of the character of the parkland has been lost since the Second World War, largely as a result of changing agricultural use and felling of trees. An avenue of trees running along the drive (Stoke Park Lane) from Stoke Park Woods to the house is on the alignment of an avenue recorded on an early 18th-century map of the area.

The area of Stoke Bruene and the grounds of the park became property of the Crown when the Longueville family were forced to surrender it to Henry VIII.

== Stoke Park – the original house ==
Stoke Park was the first English country house to display a Palladian plan: a central house with balancing pavilions linked by colonnades or screen walls. Palladio was the 16th-century Italian architect on whose work the design was based. The Palladian style became a standard type of country house construction in 18th century England under Lord Burlington. However, 80 years earlier Stoke Park in Northamptonshire was the first example, believed to have been constructed by Inigo Jones. The house ca.1700 is pictured in Colen Campbell's (sic) Vitruvius Britannicus (meaning British Architect).

Charles I granted the park and Manor House to Sir Francis Crane, director and founder of the Mortlake Tapestry Works established on the estate of John Dee, the mathematician, at Mortlake, in 1619, later the site of the Queen's Head pub. Crane was made Secretary to Charles I when he was Prince of Wales and was knighted in 1617. With grants of land, money and high prices charged for tapestries, Crane became very wealthy. He was granted ca.400 acres of Stoke Bruerne in 1629.

Crane brought the design of the house from Italy and had assistance from Inigo Jones to build it.

== The pavilions ==
The surviving portions of the house built by Robert Crane in the late 1620s, consist of two pavilions and remains of a curving colonnade, form the centrepiece of the park, with an attractive terraced 17th-century garden with views across the parkland to the south. The pavilions represent some of the earliest Palladian structures built in England and, despite some remodelling in the 18th century and modern conversion for residential use of the eastern pavilion, they are of great historic and architectural significance. The associated house was destroyed by fire in the late 19th century, although details of its design have survived in drawings from the 18th century. It was almost immediately replaced with a large Neo-Jacobean building, which, in turn was largely demolished in the late 1940s following its use by the army during the Second World War.

The standing Neo-Jacobean building is the service wing of this house, now forming a discrete private dwelling. The structures of a home farm form a group of interesting historic buildings surrounding the pavilions, but are largely screened from it by mature trees, garden hedges and the bulk of the service wing of the late 19th-century house. They include a stableblock, a 17th-century dovecot, barns, farmhouse and several former tied cottages (ie owned by the farm for use by farmworkers). All are now used for residential purposes, which has involved some loss of historic character from the agricultural structures. As a group of buildings, they have a particularly interesting mixture of historic architectural detailing in their construction from the 17th, 18th and 19th centuries.

The west pavilion contained the library, the east the chapel. The gardens have a statue of Sir George Cooke of Harefield, d.1740, probably by Henry Cheere, with a pose derived from James Cragg by Guelfi at Westminster Abbey.

== Public access ==
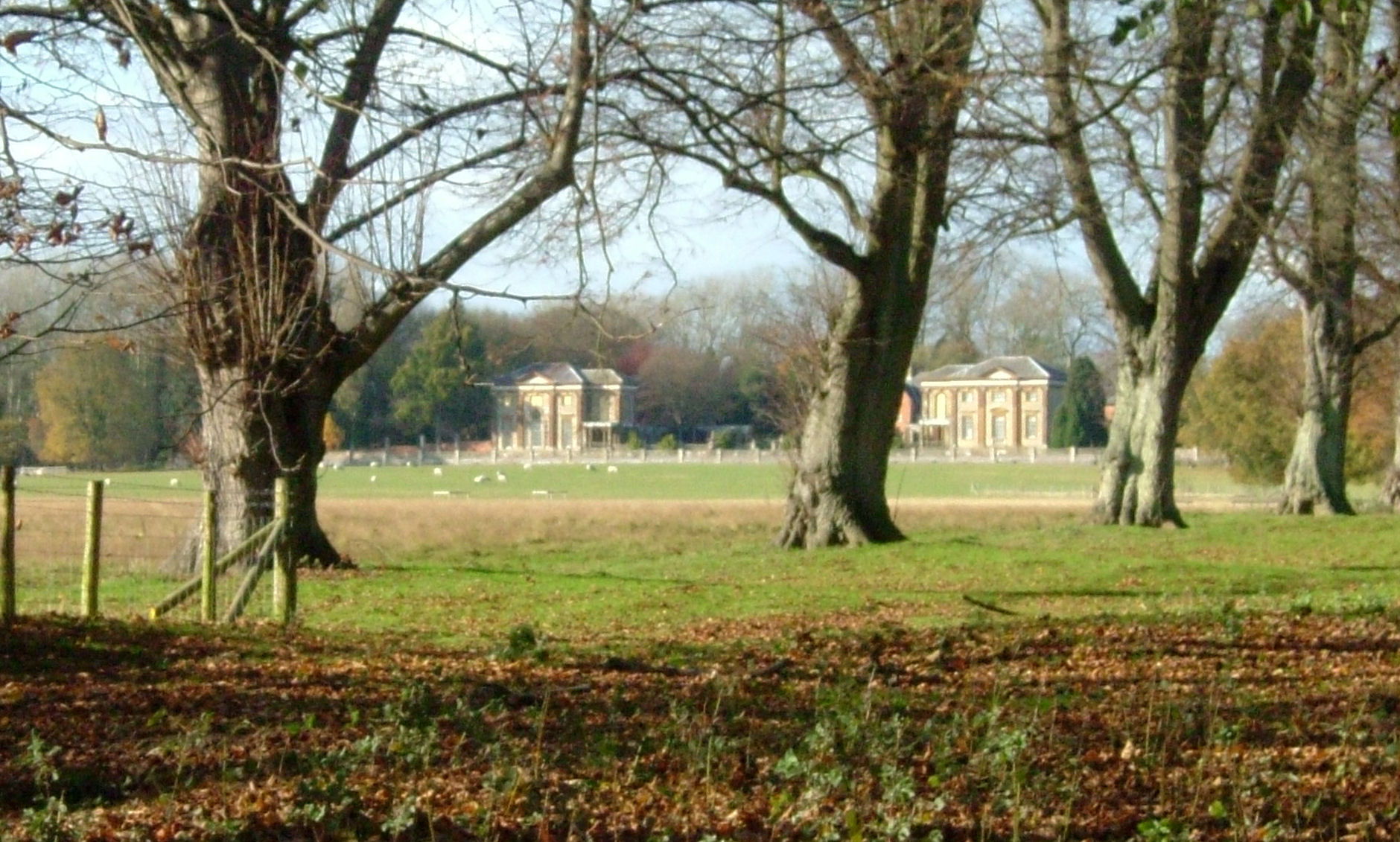
View from the A508 road

The pavilions and park are currently private property and only occasionally accessible to the public from the narrow road between the villages of Stoke Bruerne and Shutlanger opposite the turn north to Blisworth. There is some limited permitted public access to the buildings during afternoons in August for a small fee. There are usually signs indicating this at the entrance along Shutlanger Road around this time. Access to the public is required as a condition of funding by English Heritage to continue preservation activity.

The buildings can also be seen from the A508 Northampton to Milton Keynes road about two miles south of the village of Roade and one mile before the hills at Grafton Regis. If you wish to stop at this spot, there is a lay-by on the east side of the road accessible only from the southbound direction; if travelling north you can turn in the lay by on the right just past the canal bridge at the turn for Stoke Bruerne. Note: the lay-by is one-way only southbound but exit north or south is permitted. Take care crossing the road which is always busy with fast traffic.

The pavilions are also visible from an elevated position on the ridge of the River Tove valley which is just south of the site. Take to right turn to the village of Alderton on the A508 just before Grafton Regis and just after the lay-by referred to above.

== Conservation Area ==
The area of Stoke Bruerne village and surroundings, including Stoke Park, are the subject of an extensive Conservation exercise by South Northants Council where most of this text originates. Extensive additional documentation, including maps, pictures and historical documentation, is available on the South Northants Council's Planning website.
