= Crane baronets =

Extinct baronetcy in the Baronetage of England

There have been two Baronetcies created for persons with the surname Crane, both in the Baronetage of England. Both creations are extinct.

The Crane Baronetcy, of Chilton in the County of Suffolk, was created in the Baronetage of England on 11 May 1627 for Robert Crane, Member of Parliament for Sudbury and Suffolk. The title became extinct on his death in 1643.

The Crane Baronetcy, of Woodrising in the County of Norfolk, was created in the Baronetage of England on 20 March 1643 for Richard Crane. He was the brother of Sir Francis Crane, founder of Mortlake Tapestry Works. The title became extinct on Sir Richard's death in 1645.

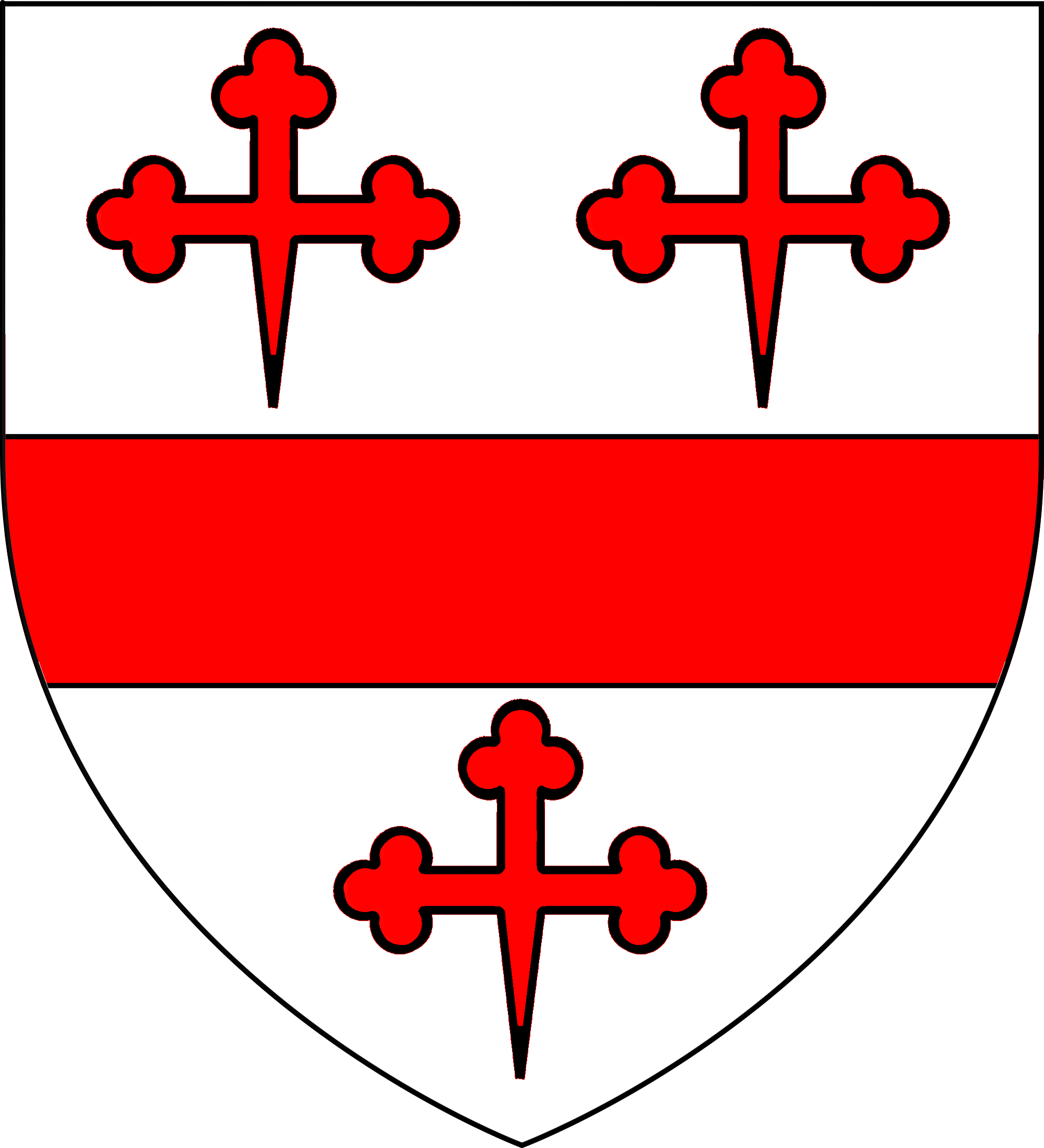
Escutcheon of the Crane baronets

== Crane baronets, of Chilton (1627) ==
- Sir Robert Crane, 1st Baronet (died 1643)

== Crane baronets, of Woodrising (1643) ==
- Sir Richard Crane, 1st Baronet (died 1645)
