= The Story of Abraham (tapestries) =

16th-century tapestries

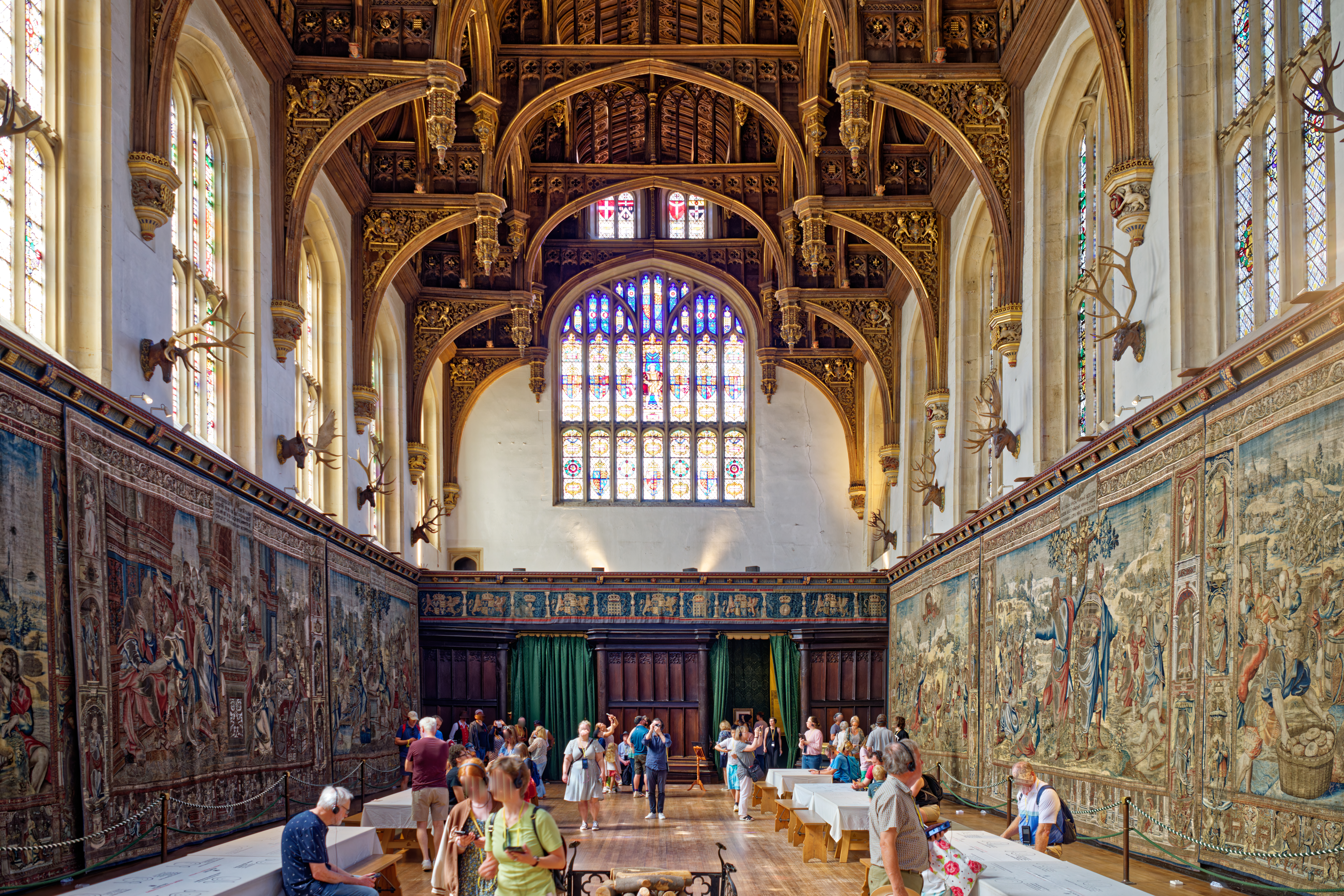
- Artist: Attributed to Pieter van Aelst III
- Year: 1540 - 1543
- Type: Tapestry
- Dimensions: 482.0 cm × 770.0 cm (189.76 in × 303.15 in)
- Location: Hampton Court, Greater London

The Story of Abraham is a set of ten Brussels tapestries depicting stories from the life of the biblical prophet Abraham. They appear to have been designed by Bernaert van Orley initially, but completed by Pieter Coecke van Aelst around 1537, both artists who were leading designers for the Brussels workshops. Three sets survive.

One set was delivered to King Henry VIII of England in 1543; it now hangs in what was probably the original intended location, the Great Hall in Hampton Court Palace near London. Two other matching sets are known, one from the Spanish royal collection, now in Madrid and one in Vienna from the Austrian imperial collection; these sets do not feature the same gilt-thread, and their lower quality when compared to the Hampton Court set suggests that Henry's was the original weaving.

== Description ==
The scenes depicted are taken from chapters 12-24 of the Book of Genesis and feature "Departure of Abraham; the Return of Sarah; the Separation of Abraham and Lot; the Meeting of Abraham and Melchizedek; God appears to Abraham; the Circumcision of Isaac and the Expulsion of Hagar; the Sacrifice of Isaac; the Purchase of the Field of Ephron; the Oath and Departure of Eliezer; and Eliezer and Rebekah at the Well."

Each tapestry is surrounded by a wide, highly decorated border. The upper section of each border features a Latin summary of the story depicted; for example, in the upper section of the Sacrifice of Isaac, a central cartouche, among scrolling acanthus leaves, bears the inscription "abraham divino oracvlo ivbetvr immolare vnigentivm svvm filivm issac" ("Abraham, at God's command, sacrifices his only begotten son, Isaac"). The side and lower sections are divided into a series of architectural niches, featuring allegorical figures with an accompanying Latin description. Across the whole series there are a total of 110 figures, each relating in some way to the central image of their tapestry. For example, "the Meeting of Abraham and Melchizedek", depicting the meeting between King Melchizedek and a victorious Abraham who is returning from defeating the King Chedorlaomer, features the personification of Fame and Honour. Other figures include fides (Faith), spes (Hope) and animi promptitude (Willingness of Spirit). This border design is believed to be derived from Raphael's Acts of the Apostles, which employs a similar scheme; Raphael, however, only relates his figures to the central scene in a general way and The Story of Abraham is believed to first set of tapestries to include borders integral to its design.

== History of the English set ==
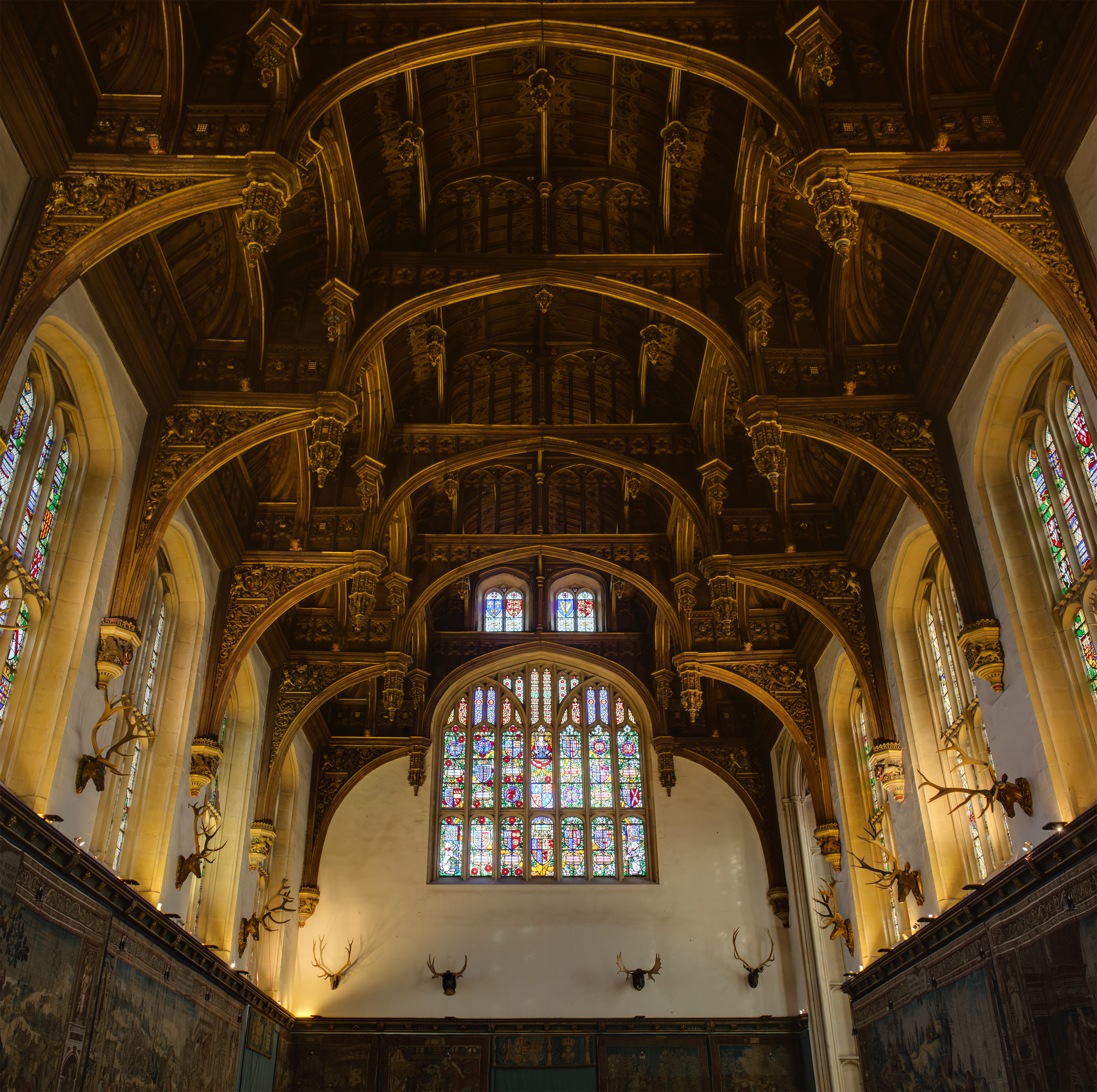
The tapestries have hung, at varying intervals, in the Great Hall of Hampton Court Palace. The top halves of a number of the sections are visible below windows.

=== Origins and context ===
Several of the Hampton Court tapestries carry the Brussels town mark and that of one of the most successful Brussels tapestry merchants of the 1530s and 1540s, Willem de Kempeneer. But no documentation relating to its purchase has yet emerged. The works were woven in the workshop of Willem de Pannemaker, one of the leading Brussels weavers. Apart from Bernaert van Orley and Pieter Coecke van Aelst, a number of designers have been suggested in the past, including Giulio Romano and Raphael (the latter wildly improbable as he died in 1520).

Originally hung in the great hall of Hampton Court Palace and delivered sometime in December 1543 or early 1544, several years after the design process began in 1537. Possibly they were commissioned to celebrate the birth of his only son, later Edward VI, by Jane Seymour. Henry's reign was one of political turmoil. He needed a son to bolster his fledgling dynasty and he had recently split with the Roman Catholic Church. He may have used the Old Testament imagery of Abraham's Covenant with God in attempt to legitimise his new position as head of an independent church, and the story of The Circumcision of Isaac to represent his desire for a much awaited male heir.

The "ten pieces of new Arras of the history of Abraham" were listed with measurements in the 1547 inventory taken after Henry's death. They were at Hampton Court in the care of David Vincent. The tapestries are recorded as being hung in the palace during the reign of Elizabeth I. German Paul Hentzner described the series in 1598 as shining with "gold and silver and silk of difference colours" and being "hung up when the Queen gives audience to foreign Ambassadors".

=== Later royal use ===
The tapestries were probably among those described as "scenes from Genesis" used with the Acts of the Apostles to decorate Westminster Abbey for the coronation of Elizabeth I. They were frequently displayed in the following centuries and Charles I hung them at a number of state occasions, including the celebration of St. George's Feast in April 1635, and the receptions of the Moroccan and of the Spanish ambassadors in 1637 and 1649. Following his deposition in 1649, an inventory of Charles I's goods valued the series at "£10 per yard or £8260". However, rather than sell them, as he did with a number of Charles's valuable possessions, Oliver Cromwell decided to retain the series for his own use. In 1656, he ordered the artist Francis Cleyn to make designs for new tapestries based on the set, and one of these suites survives at Blickling Hall.

Following the demise of the Commonwealth of England, the tapestries were once again put to state use. Both Charles II and his successor, James II of England, hung parts of the series at their coronations in Westminster Abbey. It was at this time that Charles II commissioned a second set of lesser quality, replicating the Story of Abraham series, which still hang in Jerusalem Chamber of Westminster Abbey; the reason for this commission remains unknown. Repairs were carried out on the originals in 1663 and 1664. During the reign of William III, some of the series was hung in the King's Bedchamber. By 1742 they were recorded as being set in the Audience Chamber and Drawing Room at Hampton Court.

Whilst some of the tapestries were used at the coronations of George I and George II, the tapestries 'languished' during the Hanoverian era. They were still in a good state of repair by 1727, being described as "very large and very rich with silver and gold", but by this point Hampton Court had ceased to be a regular residence for the monarch a great number of the palaces treasures were transported elsewhere to furnish other palaces. With little interest from succeeding monarchs, the palace was converted into a museum by William IV in 1830.

=== Victorians to the present day ===
By the coronation of Queen Victoria, Hampton Court had suffered massive deterioration. Both the queen and Prince Albert took an interest in improving standards at the palace and a new scientific approach to conservation was emerging. Five of the tapestries were rehung in the great hall in 1841, with a further two being rehung at the Chapel Royal, St James's Palace. By 1884 the condition of a number of tapestries at Hampton Court, including the Story of Abraham series, had reached parliament and the Treasury granted a sum of £400 for 13 needle-women to complete restoration on some 37 works. In 1887 they were valued at £200,000. George V set up a committee tasked with preserving the tapestries in 1912. The committee was established at Hampton Court, judging the tapestries too fragile and valuable to be moved. Restoration continued through the First World War, with each tapestry taking an estimated five years to complete. By 1961, The Meeting of Abraham and Malchizedek remained the only unrestored tapestry.

== Restoration and conservation ==
When conservation work was being completed on the windows of the Great Hall, it was decided that the tapestries would remain in situ, with the risks of placing them in storage considered too great. The works were first covered in a protective material, before specially commissioned copies were hung over, allowing the Great Hall to keep its previous appearance.

=== Digital restoration ===
In 2006, researchers at the University of Manchester began to create a digitally restored version of the series. By removing the lining of the tapestry, the back, which was much less affected by sunlight, was able to be used to more accurately assess what the original colours may have been. Detailed photographs were taken of both the front and the back, allowing a high-quality digital archive of the current condition of the tapestry to be created. In 2009, the recoloured images were projected onto the faded tapestries to allow visitors to see what they may have looked like when first woven. In order to minimise the chance of damage to the series, the projection only lasted six minutes at a time and was shown a maximum of five times a day. To further reduce any risk, rather than direct white light, single colours were projected onto localised areas.
