= Shutlanger =

Village in Northamptonshire, England

Coordinates: 52.1390°N 0.9421°W

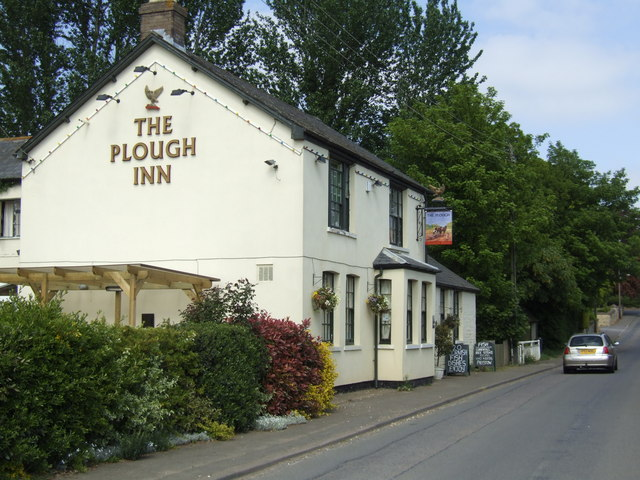
- The Plough Inn, Shutlanger

- Location within Northamptonshire
- Population: 290 (2011)
- OS grid reference: SP7249
- Unitary authority: West Northamptonshire
- Ceremonial county: Northamptonshire
- Region: East Midlands
- Country: England
- Sovereign state: United Kingdom
- Post town: Towcester
- Postcode district: NN12
- Dialling code: 01604
- Police: Northamptonshire
- Fire: Northamptonshire
- Ambulance: East Midlands
- UK Parliament: Daventry

Shutlanger is a small village and civil parish in south Northamptonshire, England. The village is 5 miles (8 km) east of Towcester and 7 miles (11 km) south of Northampton.

The village's name means 'Shuttle sloping-wood', maybe alluding to where shuttles, bolts or bars were made or acquired.

Shutlanger was originally a chapelry in the parish of Stoke Bruerne. It maintained its own poor and compiled its own census returns, and so became an independent civil parish in 1866.

In 1881 Shutlanger parish's total population was 403. In 1901 it was 339 and by 1971 it had dropped to 233. At the time of the 2001 census, it was 270 people, increasing to 290 at the 2011 census.

There was a great medieval house here called the Monastery, but it was just a house and not a monastery in the normal sense. The village is close to Stoke Park Pavilions and originally part of the Stoke Park estate with the first Palladian-style English country house. The building is a Grade I listed Building. Famous residents includes ancestors of the Richardson gang.

Shutlanger has its own Parish Council and belongs to the church grouping with Stoke Bruerne and Grafton Regis. The village has a pub (named The Plough) and a village hall. The nearest primary school and church are at Stoke Bruerne one mile east of Shutlanger.
