= Francis Cleyn =

German painter

- Frantz or Franz Klein
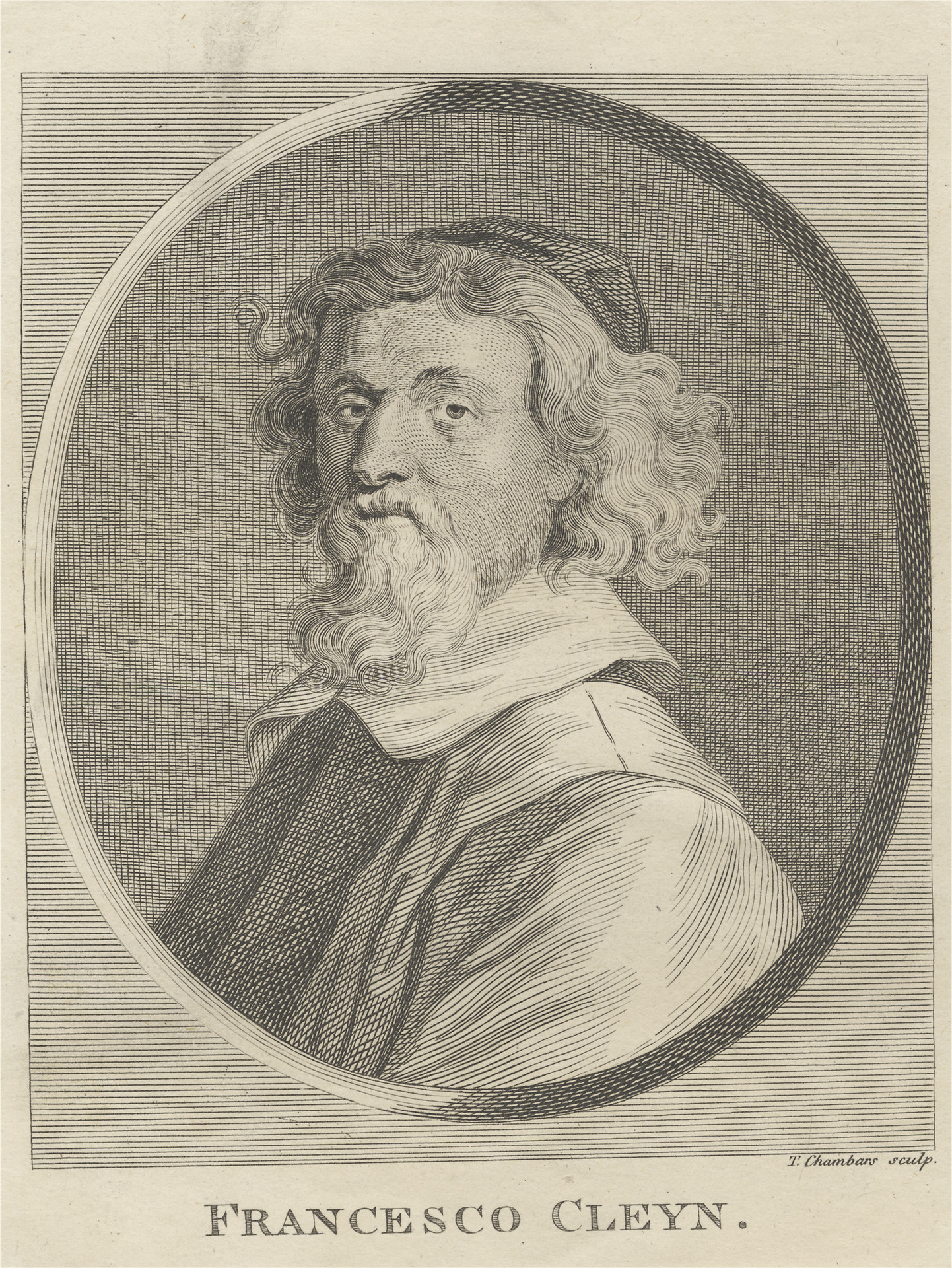
- Cleyn in an 18th-century (1762?) etching by Thomas Chambars
- Born: c. 1582; Rostock, Germany
- Died: 1658 (aged 75–76); London, England
- Known for: designing tapestries at the Mortlake Tapestry Works, Mortlake, London
- Patrons: Christian IV of Denmark, Charles I of England

Francis Cleyn (or Francesco Cleyn or Clein; also Frantz or Franz Klein; c. 1582 – 1658) was a German-born painter and tapestry designer who lived and worked in England.

== Life and career ==
Francis Cleyn was born in Rostock in Germany, and while a youth displayed such abilities that he was retained in the service of Christian IV of Denmark. During this time he painted, in 1611, a half-length portrait of Christian, now in the gallery of Copenhagen, and executed decorative works in the castle of Rosenborg and other places. Here, too, he met Sir Robert Anstruther, then ambassador extraordinary from England to the court of Denmark.

He was sent to Italy to study, and remained there four years, studying at Rome and Venice; at Venice he was introduced to Sir Henry Wotton, then English ambassador to the republic. After returning to Denmark, he proceeded to England with letters of introduction from Anstruther and Wotton to Charles, prince of Wales. He found Charles away on his expedition with Buckingham to Spain, but was warmly received by James I, who saw in him the very man he wanted for the Mortlake Tapestry Works, the new tapestry manufactory which he had recently set up under Sir Francis Crane at Mortlake, London.

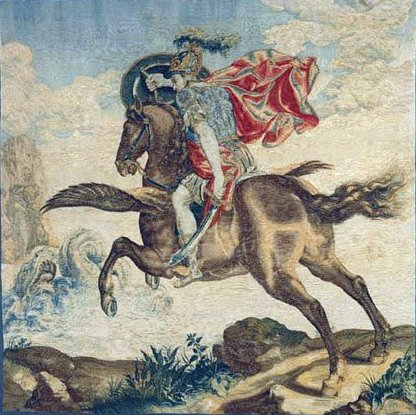
Perseus and Andromeda (1635–1645) by Francis Cleyn

So anxious was he to obtain Cleyn's services that he wrote in person to the king of Denmark, requesting that Cleyn, who had to return to Denmark to finish some work for the king, might be allowed to return to England, and offering to pay all expenses. The request was granted, and Cleyn returned to England to enter the service of Prince Charles, and was immediately employed at Mortlake.

On the accession of Charles I to the throne in 1625, he rewarded Cleyn by granting him denization and a pension for life of £100 per annum. He also built for him at Mortlake a residence near the tapestry manufactory. Here Cleyn settled with his family, and superintended the copying of cartoons, and designed the frames in which the subjects were enclosed in the tapestry.

Charles sent down five out of the seven original cartoons of Raphael from the Acts of the Apostles, then recently acquired, to be copied and reproduced in tapestry under Cleyn's direction. Copies of these were made by Cleyn's sons, Francis and John, and they were worked into tapestry at Mortlake. These and the other productions of the Mortlake manufactory were held in high estimation, especially in France, and dispersed over the continent.

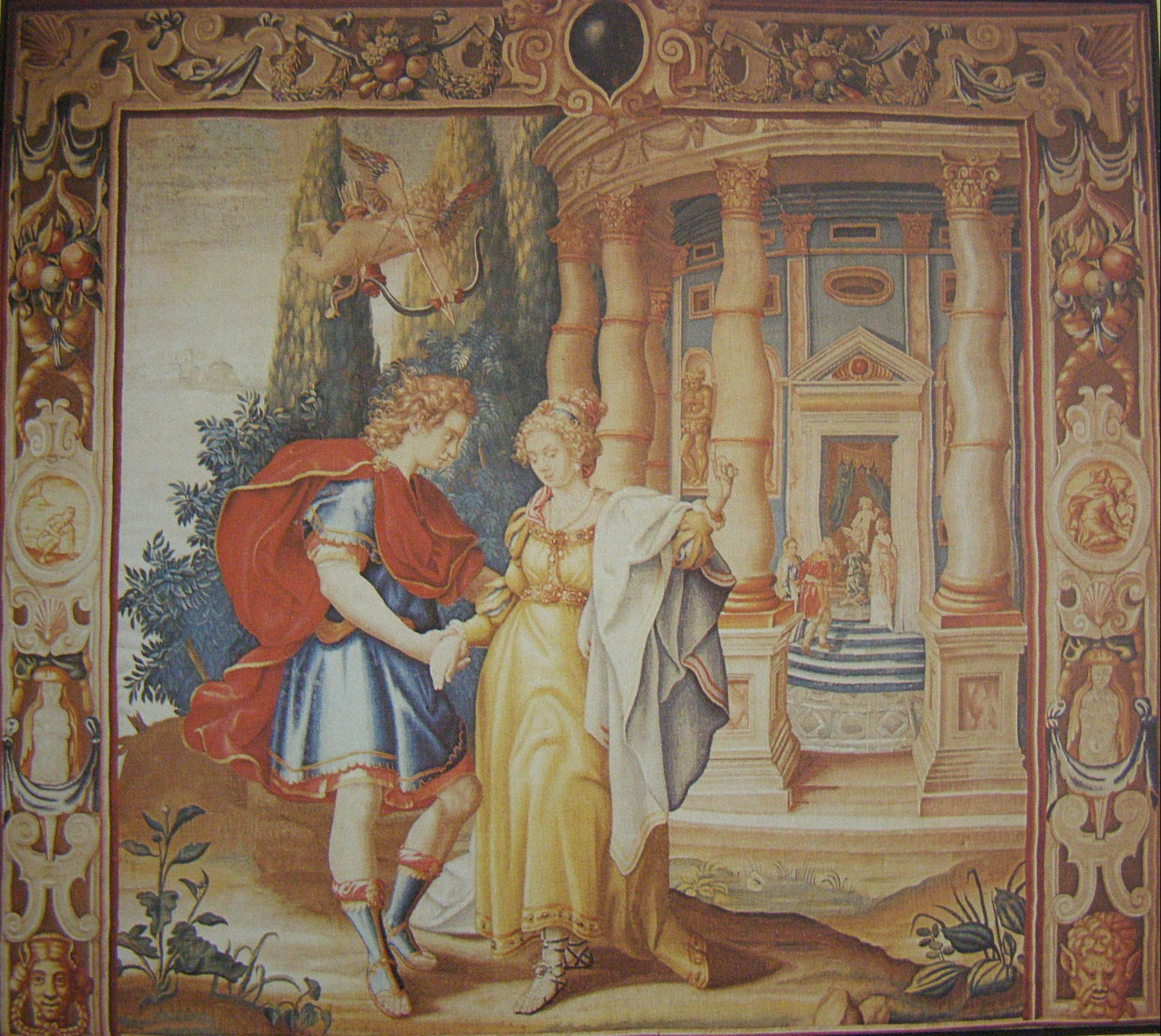
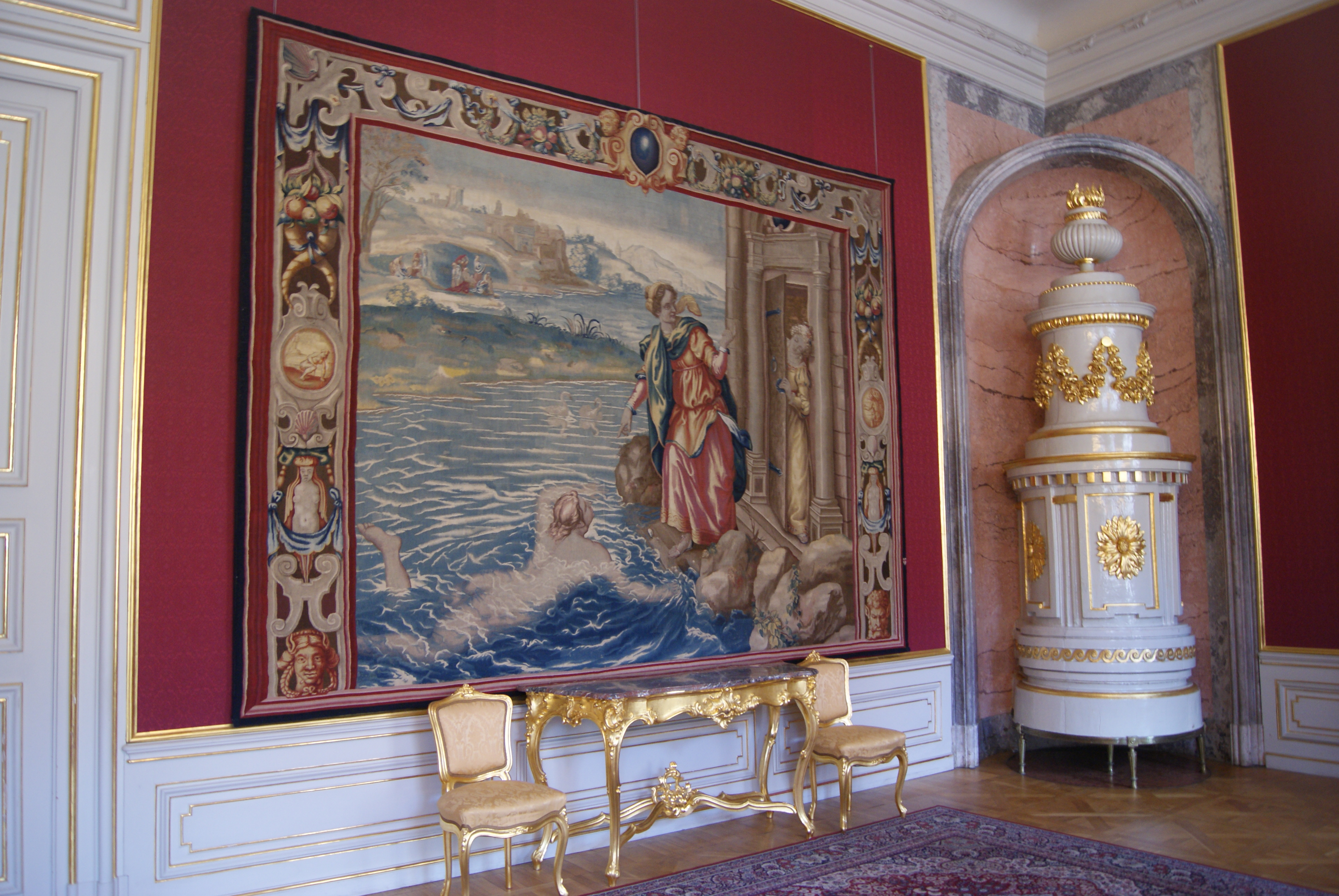
Tapestries depicting the story of Hero and Leander designed by Cleyn and woven in the 1630s at the Mortlake Tapestry Works on display at the Primate's Palace in Bratislava, Slovakia

A set of six pieces, representing the history of Hero and Leander from Cleyn's designs were at the Louvre in Paris; and there are some fine pieces of grotesque at Petworth House. The grotesques and other ornaments in these works, a line in which Cleyn appears to have been unrivalled, have always been greatly admired, and some modern authorities have had no hesitation in ascribing them to the hand of Anthony van Dyck or some more famous painter, ignoring the fact that Cleyn was spoken of at the time as a second Titian, and as "il famosissimo pittore, miracolo del secolo". Cleyn was also largely employed by the nobility to decorate their mansions. Samples of his work in this line were to be seen at Somerset House, Carew House, Parson's Green, Hanworth Palace, Wimbledon Palace, Stone Park, Northamptonshire, Bolsover Castle, and the Gilt Room at Holland House, London. Cleyn's name has become attached to the design of chairs with scallop shells backs which furnished these interiors.

With the civil war there came a check to Cleyn's prosperity, and he was chiefly employed in etching and designing illustrations for books; in 1632 he had already provided the illustrations (engraved by Pierre Lombart and S. Savery) to Sandys's edition of Ovid's Metamorphoses, of which an edition was published in Paris in 1637. He designed the illustrations, ornamental head-pieces, and so on, to the editions of the classics published by John Ogilby, namely Æsop's Fables (1651), Virgil (English edition 1654, Latin 1658), and Homer, (1660). His designs were engraved by Pierre Lombart, William Faithorne, and Wenceslaus Hollar, and were so much admired that the king of France had those for Virgil copied in a special edition of his own. Cleyn etched title-pages for E. Montagu's Lacrymæ Musarum (1650), Thomas Fuller's A Pisgah-sight of Palestine (1650), a frontispiece to Lysis, or the Extravagant Shepherd, and perhaps the etchings in the 1654 and 1660 editions of that work. He published in the form of grotesques some sets of original etchings, namely Septem Liberates Artes (1645), Varii Zophori Figuris Animalium ornati (1645), Quinque Sensuum Descriptio (1646); and a friend and contemporary artist, a Mr. English, etched some grotesques (1654), and a humorous piece from Cleyn's designs.

There are other etchings in the print room at the British Museum, attributed with great probability to Cleyn. An album of original drawings by Cleyn, held by the University of Southampton, includes studies for tapestry and two drawings for the surviving capricci of putti in the Green Room at Ham House.

In 1656, Cleyn was paid by the Commonwealth for new tapestry designs based on Henry VIII's tapestry suite of The Story of Abraham and Mantegna's Triumphs of Caesar. Although Cleyn retained his house at Mortlake, he resided for some time in Covent Garden, and died in London in 1658 at an advanced age.

== Family ==
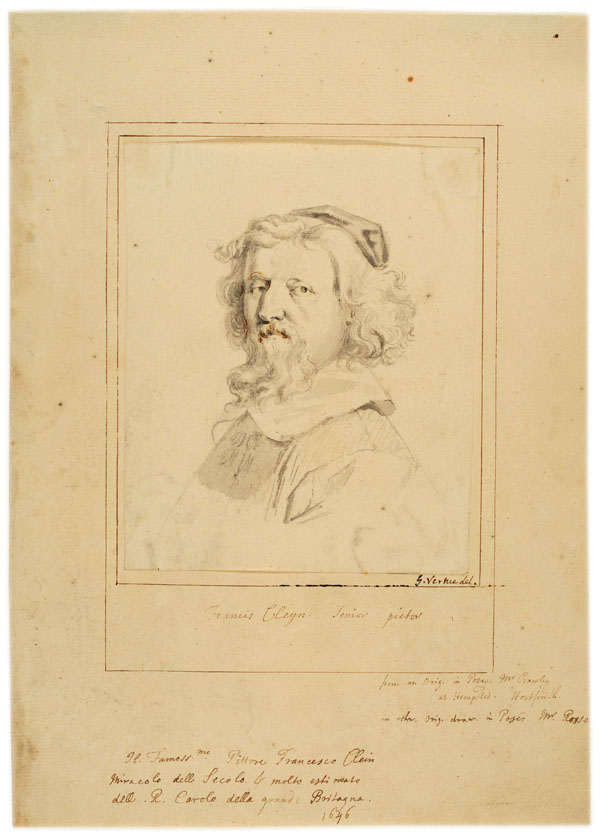
A 17th– or 18th-century drawing of Cleyn by George Vertue, possibly based on a 1646 portrait

On his death, Cleyn left three sons, Francis, John (both mentioned above), and Charles; and three daughters, Sarah, Magdalen, and Penelope. Francis Cleyn the younger was born in 1625, and was buried at Covent Garden on 21 October 1650. With his brother John he followed his father's profession, and they both attained repute as draughtsmen and miniature painters.

It is difficult to distinguish their work from that of their father. A series of drawings of the cartoons of Raphael were found at Kensington Palace; they bear the dates 1640–1646, are executed on a large scale, and highly finished; some are signed by John Cleyn, and were evidently executed by him and his brother at Mortlake. They were seen by John Evelyn, who states that the brothers were then both dead. Penelope Cleyn appears to have been also a miniature painter, and to her have been ascribed two miniatures of Cecil, Lord Roos (1677), and Dorothea, daughter of Richard Cromwell (1668), signed P.C.

== Notes ==
Attribution

This article incorporates text from a publication now in the public domain: Cust, Lionel Henry (1887). "Clein, Francis". In Stephen, Leslie (ed.). Dictionary of National Biography. Vol. 11. London: Smith, Elder & Co. pp. 26–27.
