= Francis Crane =

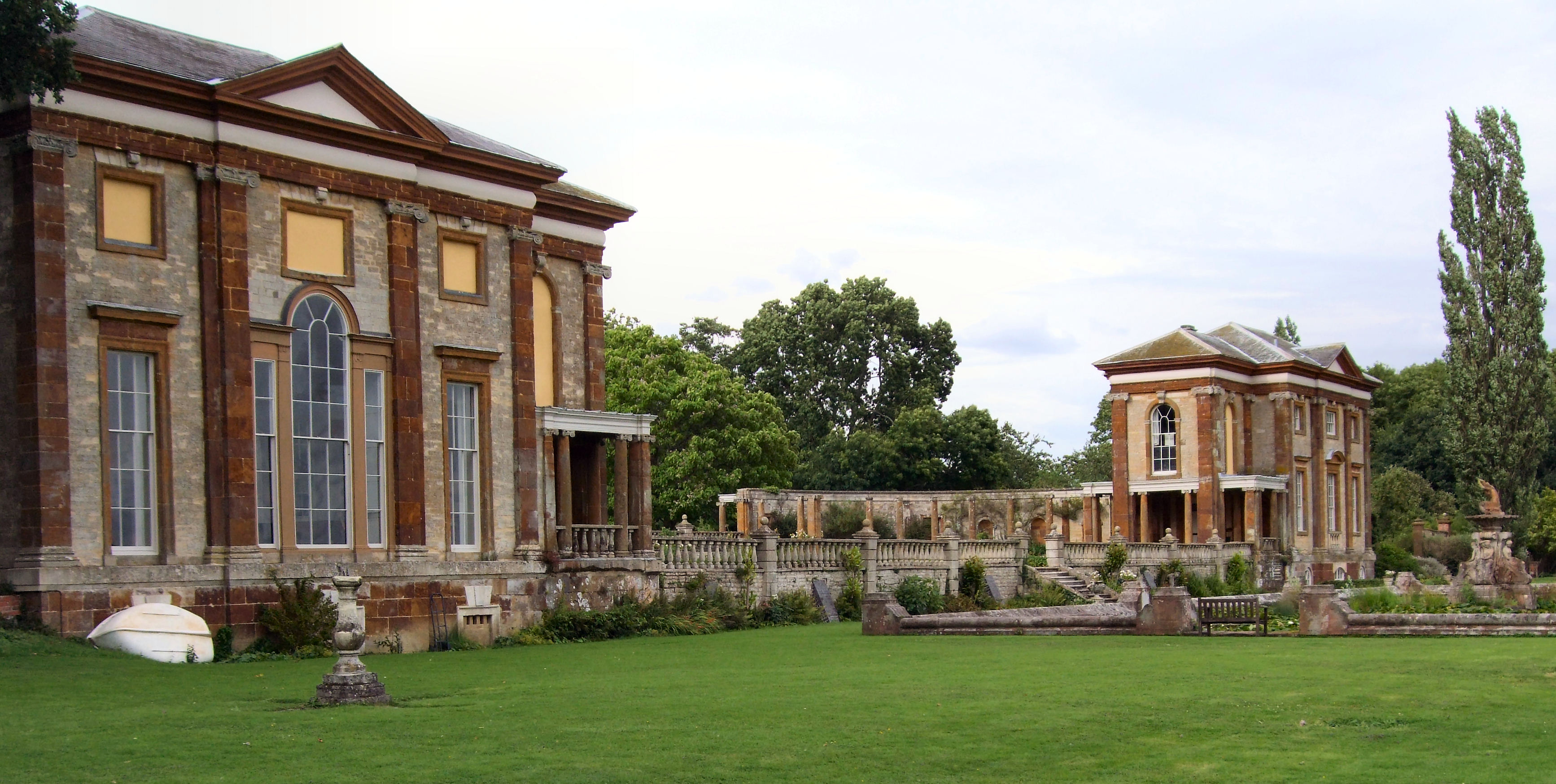
- Stoke Park pavilion
- Occupation: Businessman

Sir Francis Crane (c. 1579 – c. 1636) was the founder of Mortlake Tapestry Works at Mortlake on the south bank of the river Thames in South West London.

== Biography ==
His parentage is obscure, but his family had close links to Cornwall, and both his sisters married Cornishmen.

In April 1606 he had a grant for life of the office of Clerk of the Parliaments. He was appointed clerk to the council of Henry Frederick, Prince of Wales on 6 July 1611, and was later secretary to Charles I when the latter was Prince of Wales. During his secretaryship, he was knighted at Coventry on 4 September 1617.

Crane obtained royal patronage for a project to make tapestry and arras in 1619. The tapestry works at Mortlake almost ruined Crane, as it involved him in the considerable outlay of capital for an inadequate return, and in 1623 he was forced to appeal to the King, James I for financial help. In that year Crane was making a suite of tapestries for Prince Charles. James I died in 1625 and Crane was given much more favourable terms by the new King, Charles I, whose secretary he had been since 1617. He sat in the Parliaments of 1614 and 1621 as MP for Penryn and that of 1624 for Launceston.

In 1629 the King gave him the Manor of Stoke Bruerne in Northamptonshire, where he built Stoke Park, a fine Palladian house, possibly with assistance from Inigo Jones. Building materials for Stoke Bruerne were brought from Grafton Regis where Crane demolished a house built by Henry VIII. He was also appointed c. 1632 the Chancellor of the Order of the Garter.

He died in Paris in 1636 after an operation for bladder stones and was buried at Woodrising in Norfolk, an estate he had purchased from Thomas Southwell.

== Crane's building ==
In January 1632, Crane had obtained a legacy from his brother-in-law, Peter le Maire, for charitable purposes, and began to build a kind of almshouse for poor knights at Windsor Castle. After the death of Francis Crane, his brother Richard Crane was supposed to oversee the project, which was incomplete on his death in 1645. The building at Windsor was completed in 1658 after litigation in the Court of Chancery. It survived long enough to be drawn by Paul Sandby and was probably designed for Francis Crane by Nicholas Stone.

== Family ==
In 1618 Crane married Mary le Maire, daughter of David le Maire of Tournai, and widow of Henry Swinnerton, but had no issue. He inherited a considerable sum from Mary's brother Sir Peter le Maire, who died in 1631. A rumour that he had been pre-contracted to the Countess of Exeter, which circulated in 1618, was simply one of an extraordinary web of lies spread to damage the Countess by her enemy Lady Lake, wife of Sir Thomas Lake.

His brother and heir, Richard Crane, was created a baronet in 1643. He also left property to his niece Frances Bond. Most of the Crane estates eventually passed to the heirs of his sister Edith, who married Gregory Arundell of Sheviock.

== See also ==
- Crane baronets
