= Penelope Cleyn =

German miniature painter

Penelope Cleyn (or Clein or Klein; active 1668–1677) was a miniature painter active in London. Her exact birth and death dates are not known.

Cleyn was the youngest daughter of the German painter and tapestry designer Francis Cleyn. She was trained by her father along with her older three brothers Francis, John, and Charles, and two sisters Sarah and Magdalen, who took up their father's profession and became draughtsmen and miniature painters as well. They continued his workshop after their father died in 1658 and all died in London. Attributions of works have sometimes been difficult because of the similarities in style between Francis and his children. Penelope has been ascribed two miniatures of William Cecil, 2nd Earl of Exeter (1677), and Dorothea, daughter of Richard Cromwell (1668), signed P.C.

== Notes ==
Attribution

This article incorporates text from a publication now in the public domain: Cust, Lionel Henry (1887). "Clein, Francis". In Stephen, Leslie (ed.). Dictionary of National Biography. Vol. 11. London: Smith, Elder & Co. pp. 26–27.
