= David Vincent (courtier) =

David Vincent (died 1565) was an English courtier. He served in the Royal Wardrobe of Henry VIII, Edward VI, Mary I, and Elizabeth I.

== Career ==
David Vincent was a son of John Vincent of Barnack and his wife Anne Hill.

He was first appointed a page of the king's beds and groom of the privy chamber. In 1531, he was made keeper of the wardrobe at Richmond Palace, and in 1532, keeper of the wardrobe at Greenwich Palace. In 1536, he was appointed warden of the Royal Mint at the Tower of London, in reversion. In 1539, Henry VIII appointed him keeper of the wardrobe at Hampton Court.

In 1540, Vincent and a colleague, Roland Rugely, yeoman of the wardrobe made an inventory of tapestry at Greenwich and Hampton Court. This does not survive. In that year, the Privy Council settled a dispute between Vincent and Robert Cecil of the wardrobe. Cecil was found to be at fault and the pair were exhorted to be friends.

Vincent was given clothes that had been confiscated from Thomas Cromwell, Earl of Essex. In 1542, Vincent and Richard Bocher were rewarded with former monastic properties in Grantham and Stamford.

Vincent was made keeper of "Shene alias Richemonde" and the New Park (now called the "Old Deer Park"), by the authority of Anne of Cleves. He was asked to be a witness to the will of Henry VIII. Henry left Vincent £100 and left 100 marks to his colleague Robert Cecil.

He became a groom of the bedchamber to Edward VI, who gave him the manor of Long Ditton in 1552. An inventory was made of royal possessions in 1548. The contents of the Hampton Court wardrobe "in the charge of David Vincent" were listed. This included wall hangings and tapestries (with their subjects and measurements, including The Story of Abraham), window pieces, cloths of estate, chairs, stools, cushions, carpets, bedsteads (carved and painted), bed hangings and bedding, and furniture placed in the rooms of Hampton Court. Vincent was also responsible for a variety of items from the Secret Jewel House that had belonged to Henry VIII including dog collars, hawking equipment, sweet gloves, purses, embroidered sleeves from women's gowns, and a piece of so-called unicorn's horn mounted with silver gilt. He had been responsible for several items of silver gilt plate used by Henry VIII at Hampton Court, including an impressive table conduit or fountain suitable for use as a container of salt which had "a woman in the top holding in th'one hand a shield and in th'other hand three pearls".

David Vincent was sent to Kew to take a "view" or inventory of the confiscated goods of John Gates in August 1553. Gates was a supporter of Lady Jane Grey. As keeper of the royal wardrobe, David Vincent was involved in preparations for the reception of Philip of Spain in 1554 and the royal marriage. Thomas Cawarden was ordered to deliver any items of potential use at Nonsuch Palace to Vincent.

== Later years ==
Vincent received New Year's Day gifts in the wardrobe at Hampton Court in 1559, including a pearl-embroidered cushion given by the Duchess of Suffolk. The Duchess also gave a velvet-covered copy of Ecclesiastes which Elizabeth kept herself.

In 1560, the wardrobe goods and Vincent's records were reviewed and compared with the 1548 inventory by Nicholas Bristowe, William Note, and Edward Pigeon.

Vincent married Elizabeth Spencer from Northamptonshire, and secondly Jane Rotsey, a daughter of William Rotsey of King's Norton, Worcestershire and his wife Margaret Walsh of Shelsley Walsh. Jane was the widow of William Greensmith.

David Vincent died at Richmond in 1565. The keeper of wardrobe at Hampton Court was now Richard Todd. By his will, Vincent left a gold ring and a tablet or locket with an engraved agate depicting Saint Michael to his daughter Anne Vincent, which her mother had worn. Anne subsequently married Edward Heron.

His eldest son Thomas Vincent (died 1613) was knighted by Elizabeth I when she visited his house at Stoke d'Abernon on 25 September 1601. David Vincent's daughter Jane married John Chaworth of Cropwell Butler and was the mother of George Chaworth, 1st Viscount Chaworth.
