= Mortlake Tapestry Works =

Historical tapestry manufactory in England

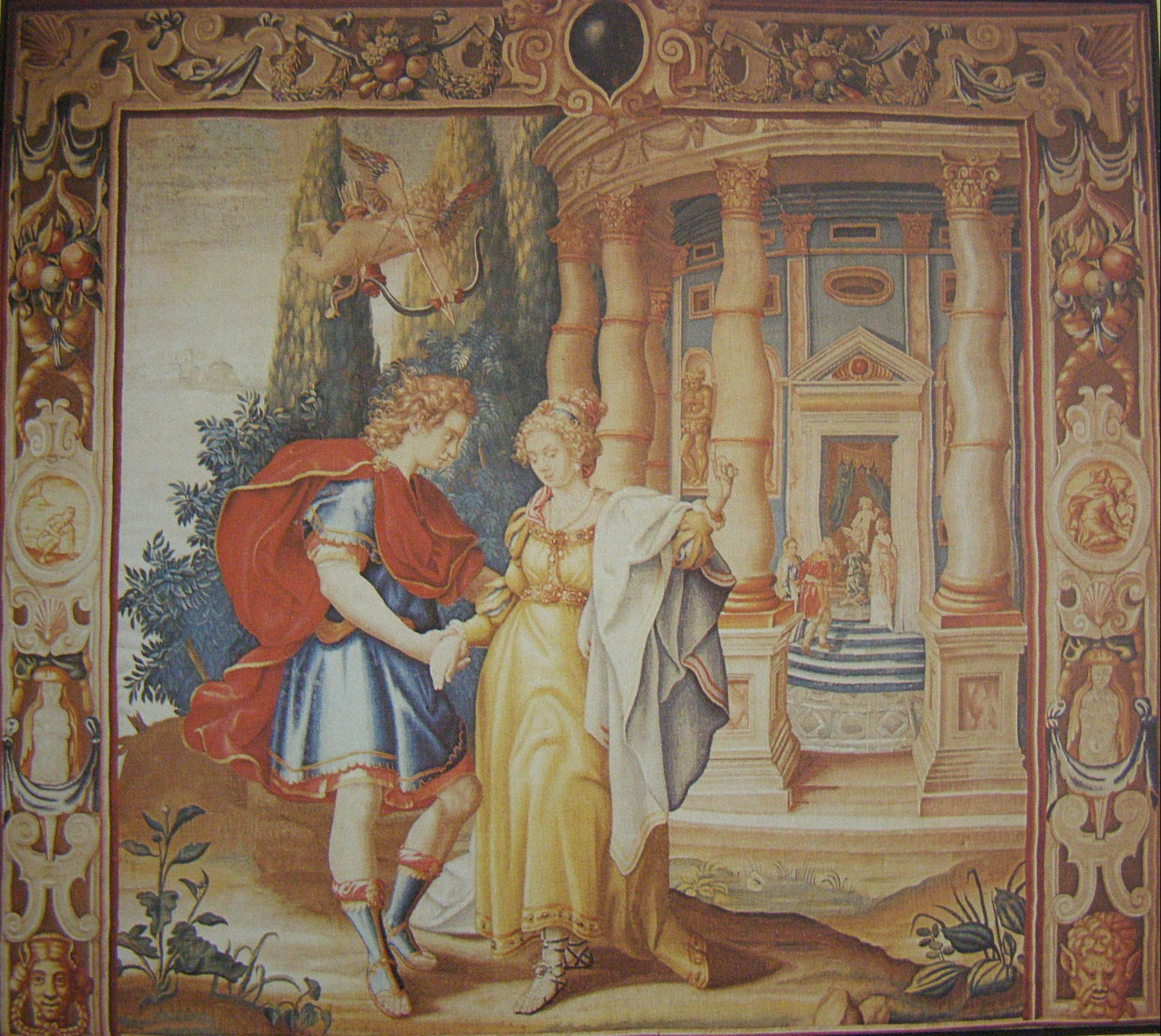
One of the Hero and Leander series, in the Primate's Palace, Bratislava, Slovakia. Designed by Francis Cleyn (c. 1582–1658) and woven in the 1630s

The Mortlake Tapestry Works was established alongside the River Thames at Mortlake, then outside, but now in South West London, in 1619 by Sir Francis Crane. It produced lighter, if vastly more expensive, decoration for rooms than the previously favoured Elizabethan wood panelling. King Charles I was a heavy investor and it prospered. The English Civil War disrupted all luxury goods businesses. Oliver Cromwell tried to help. Charles II imposed heavy duties on competitive imports, but the decline could not be reversed. It closed in 1704; some of the weavers continued to work privately.

== Royal patronage ==
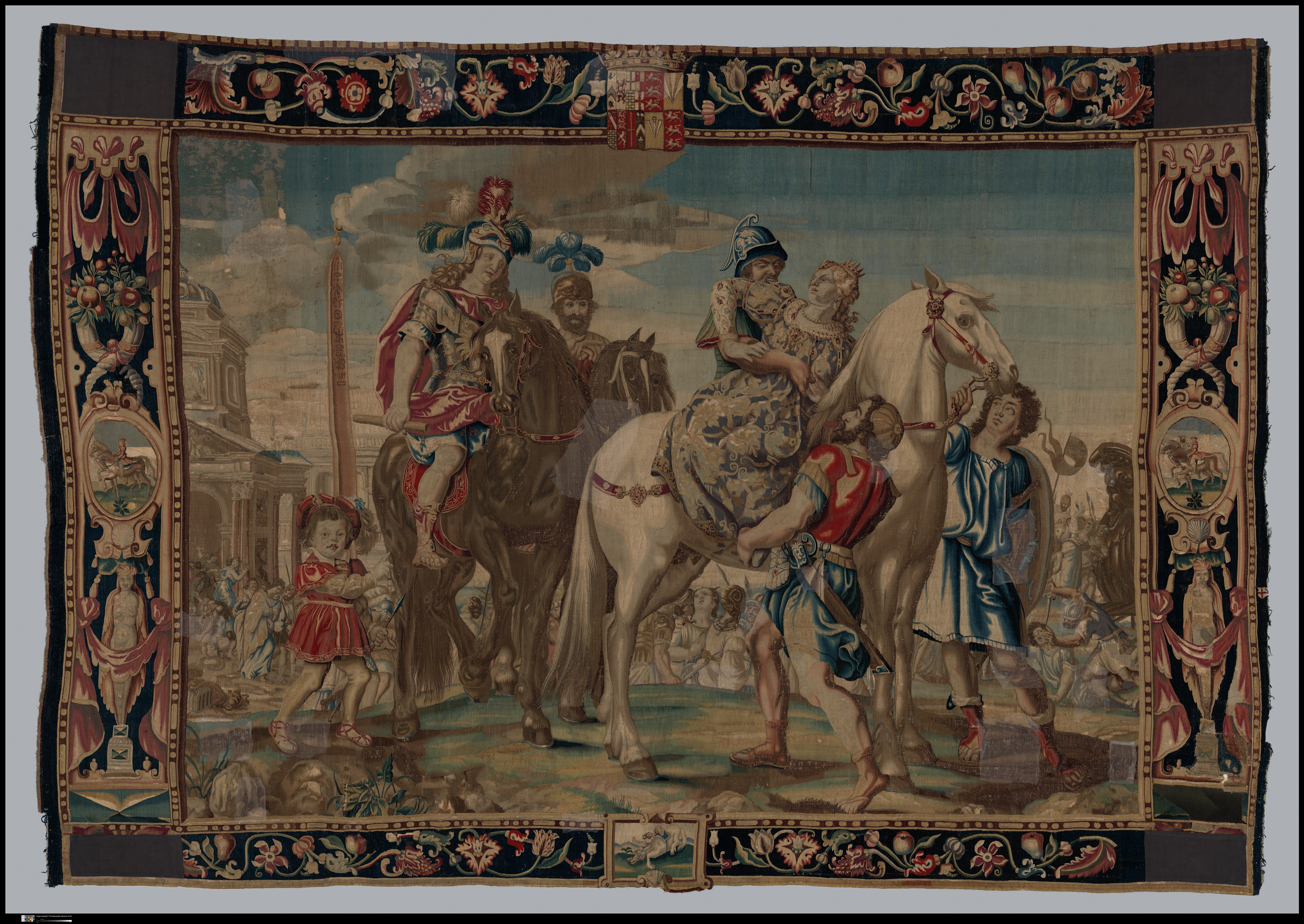
The Seizure of Cassandra by Ajax from a set of The Horses, c. 1650–70, another Cleyn design

The proposal to establish a tapestry works at Mortlake came from King James I in 1619. It was to be under the management of Sir Francis Crane who undertook the recruitment of weavers and to meet the cost of building and fitting up premises. In return he was to receive a fee, the exclusive right to weave tapestries of all sorts for 21 years and they were to be free of customs duties. Since there was no effective pool of labour in England, some 50 Flemish workers were brought in great secrecy, mainly from Brussels and the Low Countries (Belgium) where tapestry weaving was a major industry. It was agreed that some of the masters would be naturalised on the word of Sir Francis. The craft was to be taught to suitable boys in the orphanages of the City of London. The City agreed to pay their maintenance during the seven-year apprenticeship and Sir Francis would supply the looms and the materials.

The works were first established on John Dee's estate in Mortlake, later the site of the Queen's Head pub. Initially, the factory mostly copied designs from the large collection assembled by Henry VIII, with updated borders in more contemporary styles.

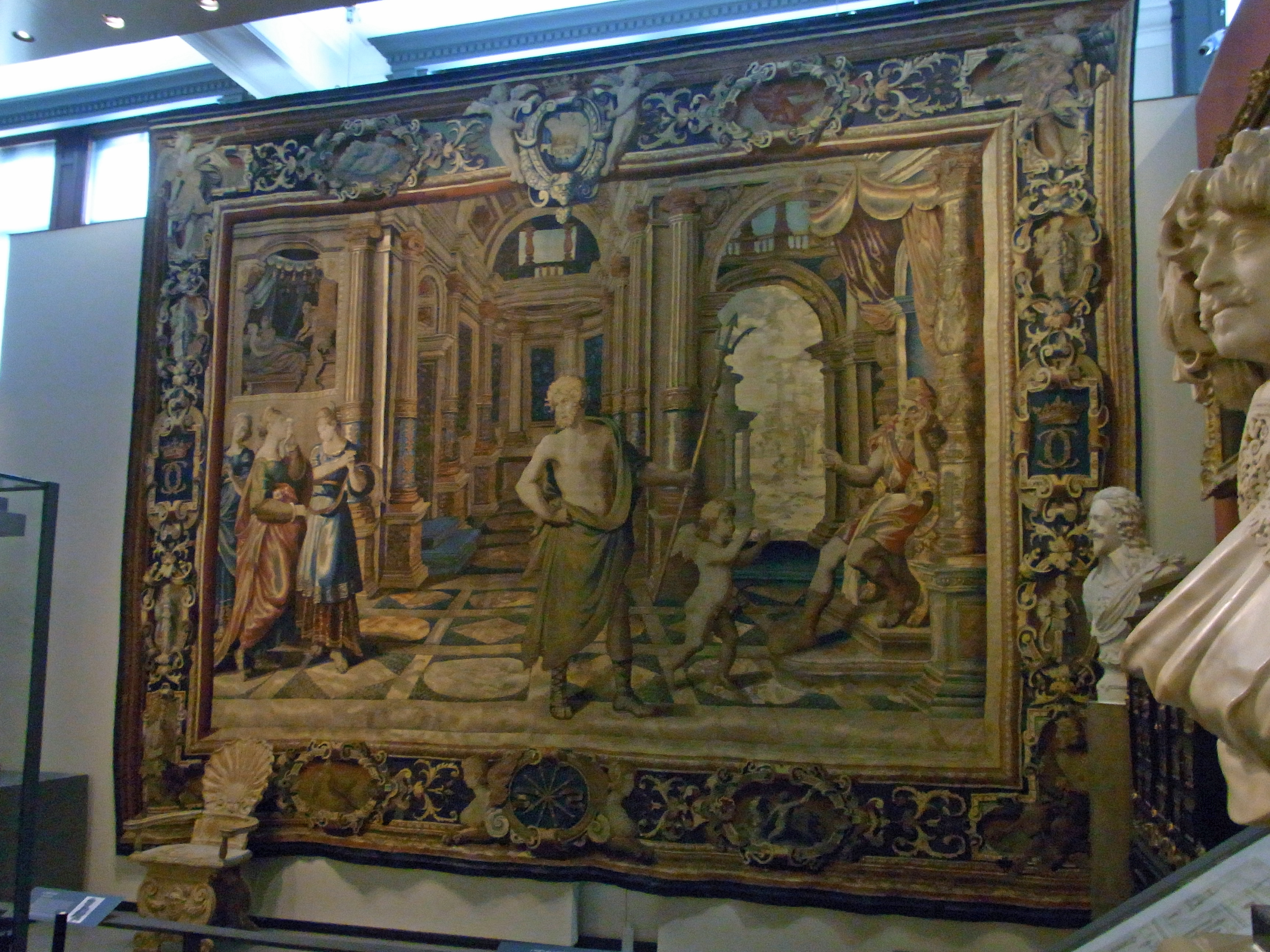
Vulcan and Venus; Neptune and Cupid Plead for the Lovers, 1620-25, Wool, silk and metal thread; Height: 453 cm, Width: 578 cm. Victoria and Albert Museum

Knighted in 1617, Crane later became Secretary to Charles I when he was Prince of Wales. However, it was the arrival of an able designer, Francis Cleyn, Clein or Klein, German-born and previously in the service of the king of Denmark, together with the patronage of Charles both when Prince of Wales and later as king which gave the works a good start. In 1629, Charles I granted Crane c. 400 acres of Stoke Park at Stoke Bruerne in Northamptonshire, England, together with a manor house. Although Crane became very wealthy when he died in 1637 his brother Captain Richard Crane found himself unable to pay the weavers and eventually sold the project to the Crown.

The Mortlake workshop continued to function for the rest of the century though its fortunes fluctuated. The English Civil War was a difficult period, but the Commonwealth supported the workshop, and in 1656 Francis Cleyn was paid for making new designs. Royal patronage was revived under Charles II. When the Royal Collection was valued before being broken up under the English Commonwealth, a third of the most valuable items were sets of Mortlake tapestries.

Accounts of the cost of materials, wages and details of the way in which the work was apportioned between named weavers survive for a few tapestries.

== Tapestries ==
The Mortlake weavers were highly skilled in depicting natural textures and effects such as flesh and water. Their products can be seen in many museums and English country houses. In 2020, Mortlake tapestries from the Royal Collection were on display at St James's Palace, Kensington Palace and the Palace of Holyroodhouse.

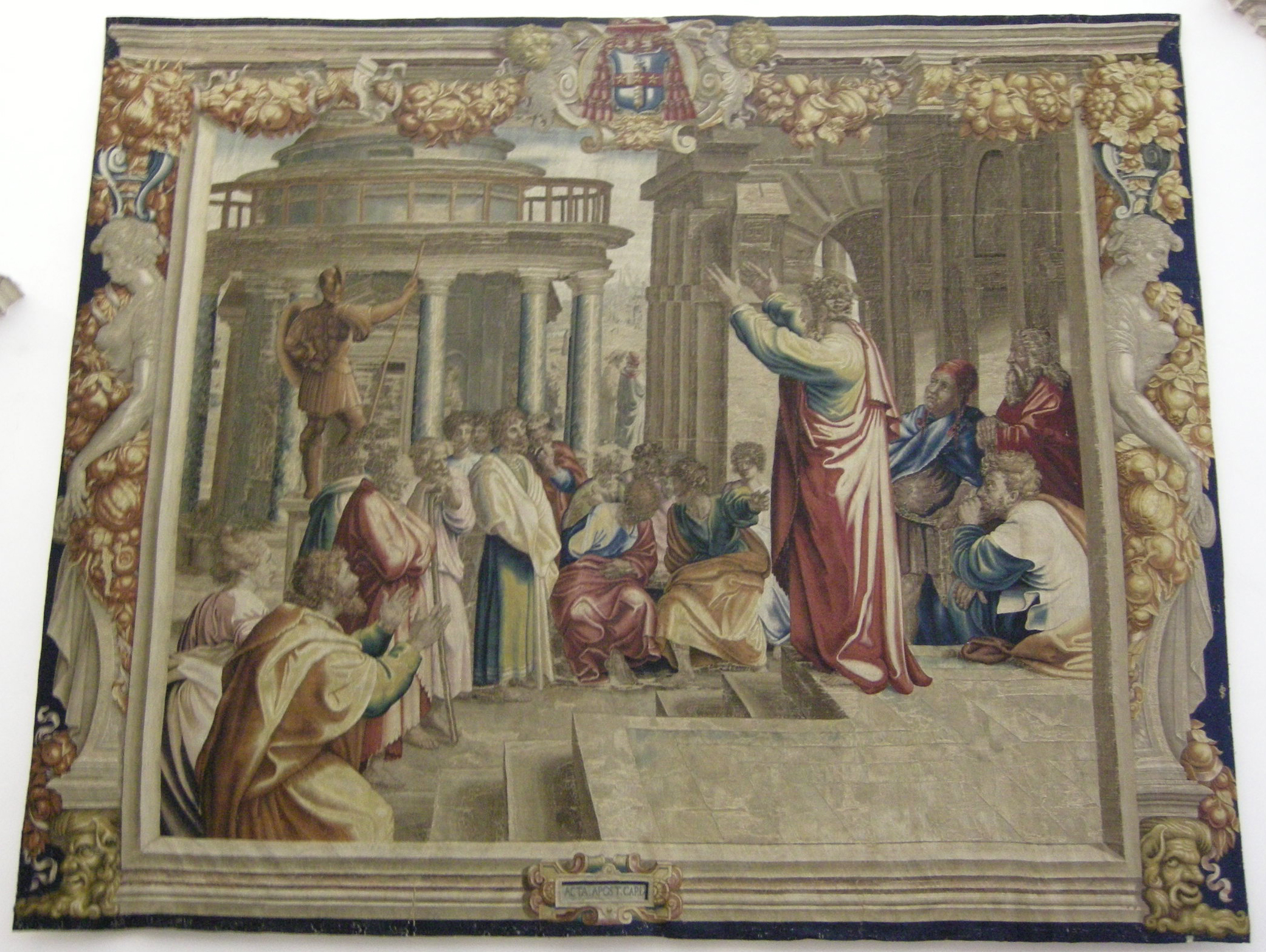
Saint Paul Preaching in Athens, from one of the sets after the Raphael Cartoons, now in the Ducal Palace, Urbino

One of their most grand and popular sets was the seven tapestries based on the Raphael Cartoons made for the Sistine Chapel tapestries, and a century later bought in Genoa by Charles I in 1623. He paid £500 each for a set, with new baroque borders; the Royal Collection already had a set made in Brussels for Henry VIII. Several other sets were made in Mortlake, and the Royal Collection now has another set, which is displayed at Hampton Court Palace. Charles I's set was bought by Cardinal Mazarin when his collection was broken up under the English Commonwealth, and now belongs to the French government. Forde Abbey, Chatsworth House, the Duke of Buccleuch and others have sets. A set of six tapestries is now in the Gemäldegalerie Alte Meister in Dresden.

Lord Leverhulme acquired a Mortlake tapestry series in 1918 from Stella Hall, near Newcastle, home of the family of the industrialist Sir Joseph Cowen (1800–73). This was a complete set of six of one of the most popular tapestry series woven by Mortlake, illustrating the ancient Greek story of the tragic love of the priestess Hero for Leander. Leander swam the dangerous currents of the Hellespont, the straits between Europe and Asia at the Bosphorus, in order to see his love, but was drowned one stormy night. The set may have been woven for Stella Hall, which was demolished in 1955. In the 17th century, it was the home of the Tempest family, a wealthy Catholic courtier family, loyal throughout the reigns of the Stuart kings. It is now in the Lady Lever Art Gallery, Port Sunlight, Merseyside Mortlake's chief designer Francis Cleyn designed the series in 1625 and the first set was woven for James I. A further set was discovered folded up behind wallpaper in the Primate's Palace, Bratislava, Slovakia, which is now on display there.

The Metropolitan Museum of Art in New York has a larger and later set known as The Horses, with various mythological subjects featuring horses. These belonged to the Cavalier Henry Mordaunt, 2nd Earl of Peterborough and his descendants until 1920. Ten pieces are kept at Musée Labenche at Brive-la-Gaillarde.
