= Grafton Regis =

Village in Northamptonshire, England

Coordinates: 52.1145°N 0.8965°W

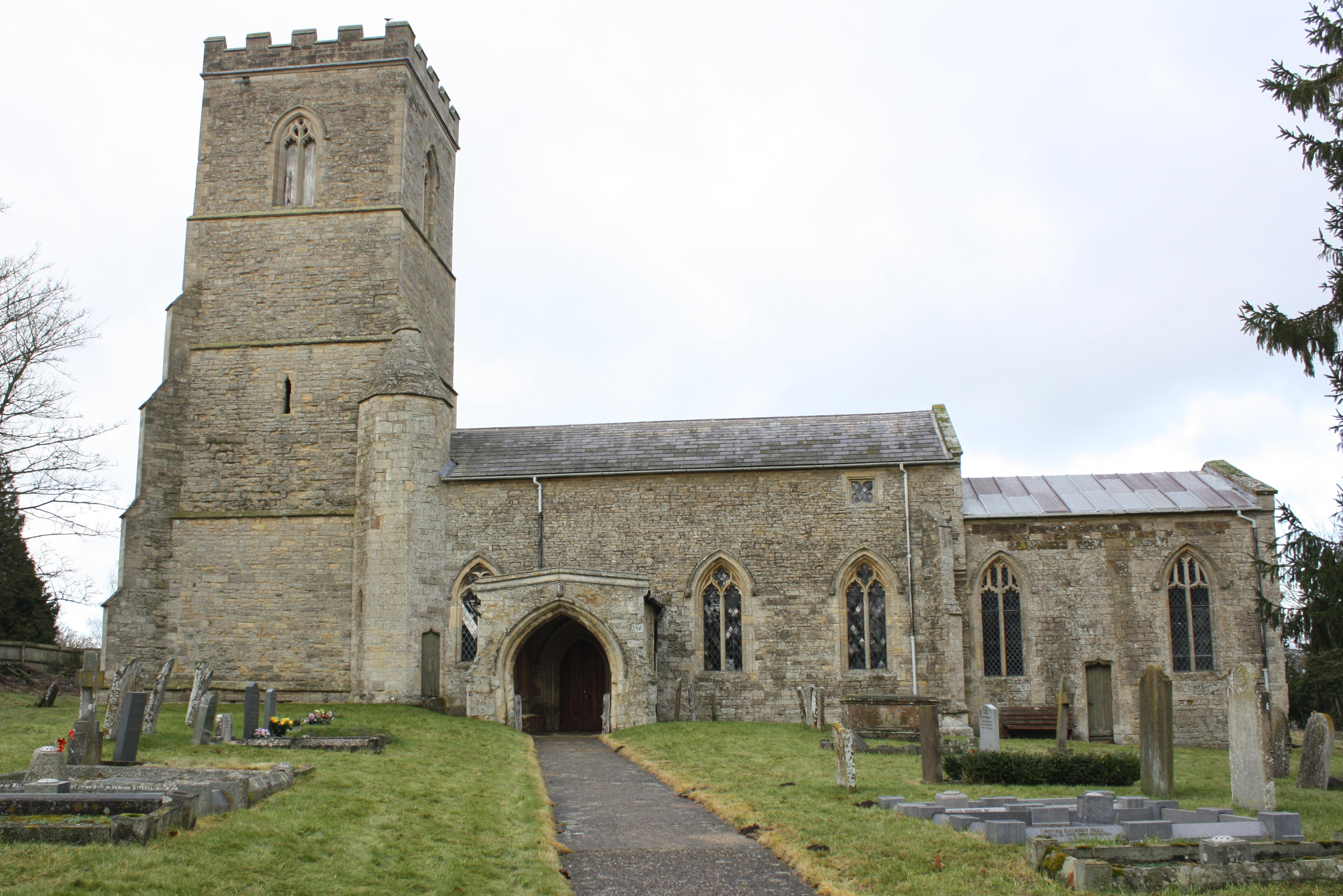
- St Mary's Church, Grafton Regis

- Location within Northamptonshire
- Population: 152
- OS grid reference: SP7546
  - London: 64 miles (103 km) SE
- Unitary authority: West Northamptonshire
- Ceremonial county: Northamptonshire
- Region: East Midlands
- Country: England
- Sovereign state: United Kingdom
- Post town: TOWCESTER
- Postcode district: NN12
- Dialling code: 01908
- Police: Northamptonshire
- Fire: Northamptonshire
- Ambulance: East Midlands
- UK Parliament: Daventry

Grafton Regis is a village and civil parish in the eastern edge of West Northamptonshire, England, on the border with Buckinghamshire. The village is east of the A508 road, on which it has a short frontage and two bus stops, and is around 8 miles (13 km) south of Northampton and 9 miles (14 km) northwest of Milton Keynes. The population of the civil parish (including Alderton) at the 2001 census was 152. This increased to 253 at the 2011 census.

The peerage title Duke of Grafton is named for this village.

== History ==
The village's Old English name, grāftūn, means "Grove farm/settlement". The village was a crown possession, hence the "Regis" addition, likely added by later Norman lords to distinguish it from the nearby Grafton Underwood.

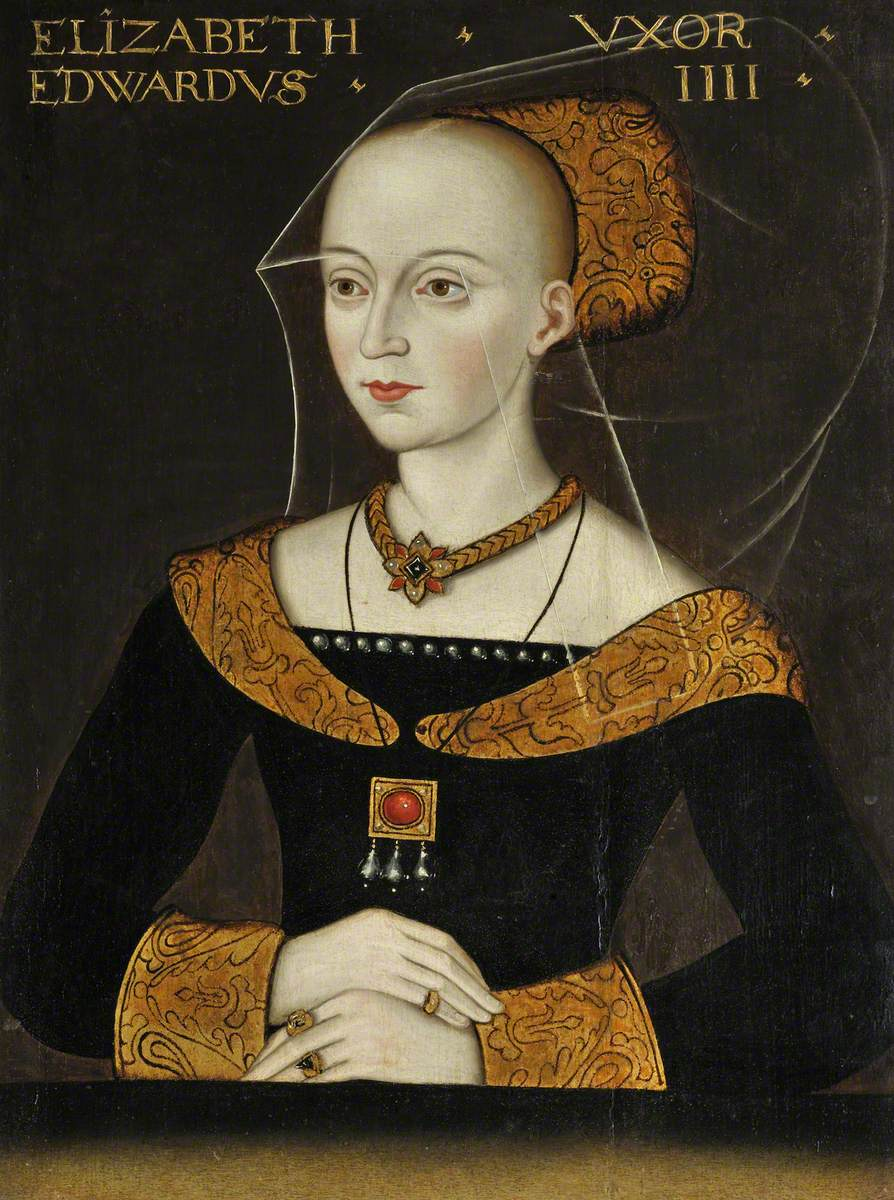
Elizabeth Woodville, queen consort to King Edward IV and mother of Edward V, was born in Woodville Manor House, west of the current village

A prehistoric site in Grafton dates back to circa 2500 BC according to Iron Age pottery which was found to the west of the main Northampton Road and to the south of Grafton Lodge, which was a Roman site which produced pottery.

During the Anglo-Saxon period, Grafton Regis was part of the Hundred of Cleyley, with a population of merely one household by the Norman conquest. Recorded also in the Domesday book are 2 ploughlands and 1 lord's plough teams.

After 1066, the village was part of, and probably the namesake of, the Honour of Grafton held by Count Robert of Mortain. Lordship changed hands from William to Godwin from 1066-1086. A substantial capital messuage stood west of the Church in the Middle Ages. From 1100 to 1348, the manor was in the hands of a Norman monastery whose bailiff or lessee probably occupied the house. 62 people are recorded in that period.

In 1440, the mansion officially became a 'manor house' which belonged to the Woodville family, during which time the village was known as Grafton Woodville. The manor was the birthplace of Elizabeth Woodville, queen consort to King Edward IV. Also born at the manor was Elizabeth's younger brother, Anthony Woodville, 2nd Earl Rivers KG (ca.1440 –1483), a courtier, bibliophile and writer.

The house and manor passed to the Grey Marquesses of Dorset, who were descendants of queen consort Elizabeth Woodville by her first marriage to Sir John Grey. At the end of the 15th century, the house and manor passed to King Henry VIII, grandson of Elizabeth Woodville by Edward IV.

Anne of Denmark and King James stayed at Grafton Regis in June 1603 and travelled on to Salden Manor at Mursley in Buckinghamshire. They were hosted at Grafton by George Clifford, 3rd Earl of Cumberland, Keeper of Grafton Regis since 1602, who organised a tournament involving the Alexander or Zinzan brothers. Lady Anne Clifford later wrote that her father lived in the "old house at Grafton" and entertained the king and queen with "great magnificence". The Duke of Lennox was steward of the manor, and the manor was granted to Prince Henry. The old great hall was dismantled in 1606, but most of the buildings were repaired. King James visited four times. Prince Henry rewarded musicians at Grafton with £1 on 19 August, 1610.

== Geography ==
The ancient parish of Grafton Regis occupied some 1,300 acres on the west bank of the river Tove. The village extends back some distance from the road, albeit at a very low density, towards a church at the eastern edge of the village. Grafton is on the southern ridge of the valley of the River Tove which flows east between the village and Stoke Bruerne to the north and then to the east of the village. Stoke Bruerne church and Stoke Park Pavilions are clearly visible in the distance. The Grand Union Canal passes close by to the east.

Almost all the village on the east side of the A508 is a conservation area.

== Buildings ==
Woodville Manor House appears to have stood on the west side of the A508 road according to excavation in 1964-5. These revealed a medieval of monastic origin with a cloister and small church. They were converted to secular use in the 15th century. Tiles with the Woodville family arms were discovered in the church.

Another Manor House is on the east side of the A508 road near the parish church. It is the remains of a house built by Henry VIII. Francis Crane demolished a part of the house in the 1620s for materials to build Stoke Park at Stoke Bruerne.

The parish church is dedicated to St Mary and of early 13th-century origin.

== See also ==
- The White Queen (novel), a novel by Philippa Gregory
- The White Queen (TV series), a BBC TV series based on the Gregory novels
- Elizabeth Woodville Secondary School, Northamptonshire (2011)
- Regis (place)
- List of place names with royal patronage in the United Kingdom
