= A508 road =

Road in Leicestershire and Northants

A508

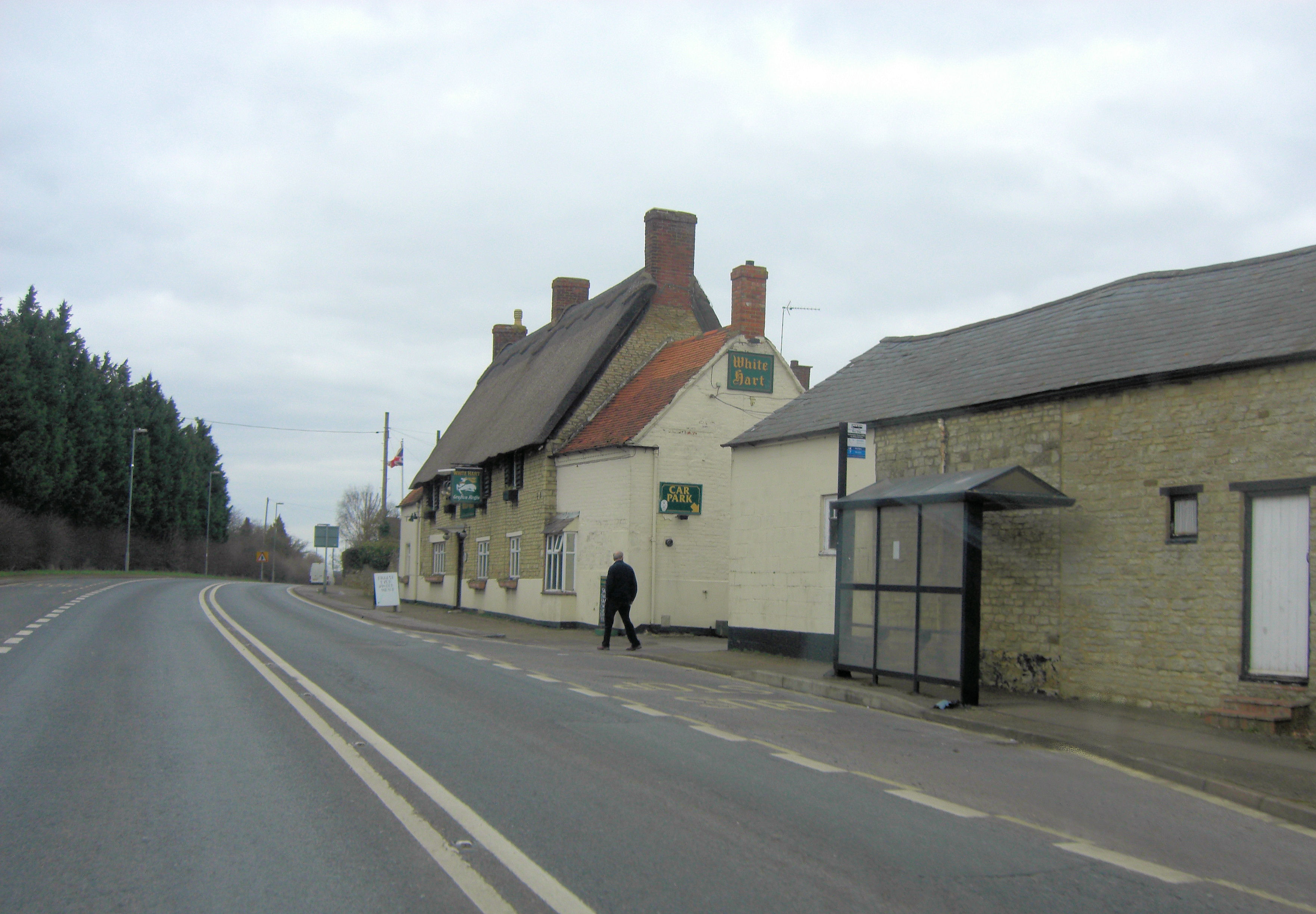
- A508 in Grafton Regis

Major junctions
- North end: Market Harborough; 52.4782°N 0.9136°W

Location
- Country: United Kingdom
- Primary destinations: Market Harborough; Northampton; Milton Keynes

Road network
- Roads in the United Kingdom; Motorways; A and B road zones
← A507	→ A509

The A508 is a north-south A-class road in central England, forming the route from Market Harborough in Leicestershire, via Northampton, to Old Stratford in Northamptonshire, just outside Milton Keynes.

== History ==
The route of the A508 follows a long-established route from Northampton to Market Harborough, crossing medieval bridges, or their replacements, at Pitsford and Great Oxendon.
