= Stoke Bruerne =

Village and civil parish in England

Coordinates: 52.1424°N 0.91569°W

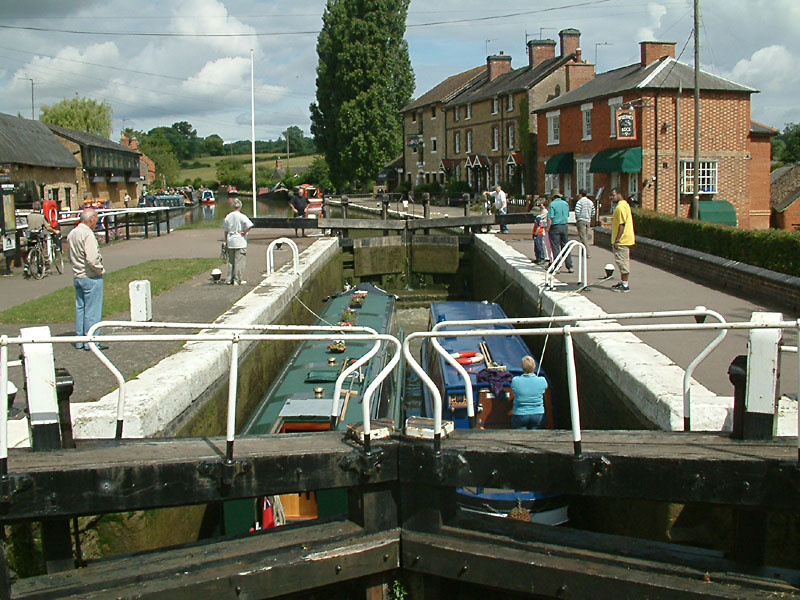
- Narrowboats in the top lock of the Stoke Bruerne flight

- Location within Northamptonshire
- Population: 395 (2001 Census); 373 (2011 census)
- OS grid reference: SP7450049500
  - London: 64 miles (103 km)
- Civil parish: Stoke Bruerne
- Unitary authority: West Northamptonshire
- Ceremonial county: Northamptonshire
- Region: East Midlands
- Country: England
- Sovereign state: United Kingdom
- Post town: Towcester
- Postcode district: NN12
- Dialling code: 01604
- Police: Northamptonshire
- Fire: Northamptonshire
- Ambulance: East Midlands
- UK Parliament: Current: Northampton South; from next General election: South Northamptonshire

Stoke Bruerne is a village and civil parish in West Northamptonshire, England, about 10 miles (16 km) north of Milton Keynes and 7 miles (11 km) south of Northampton.

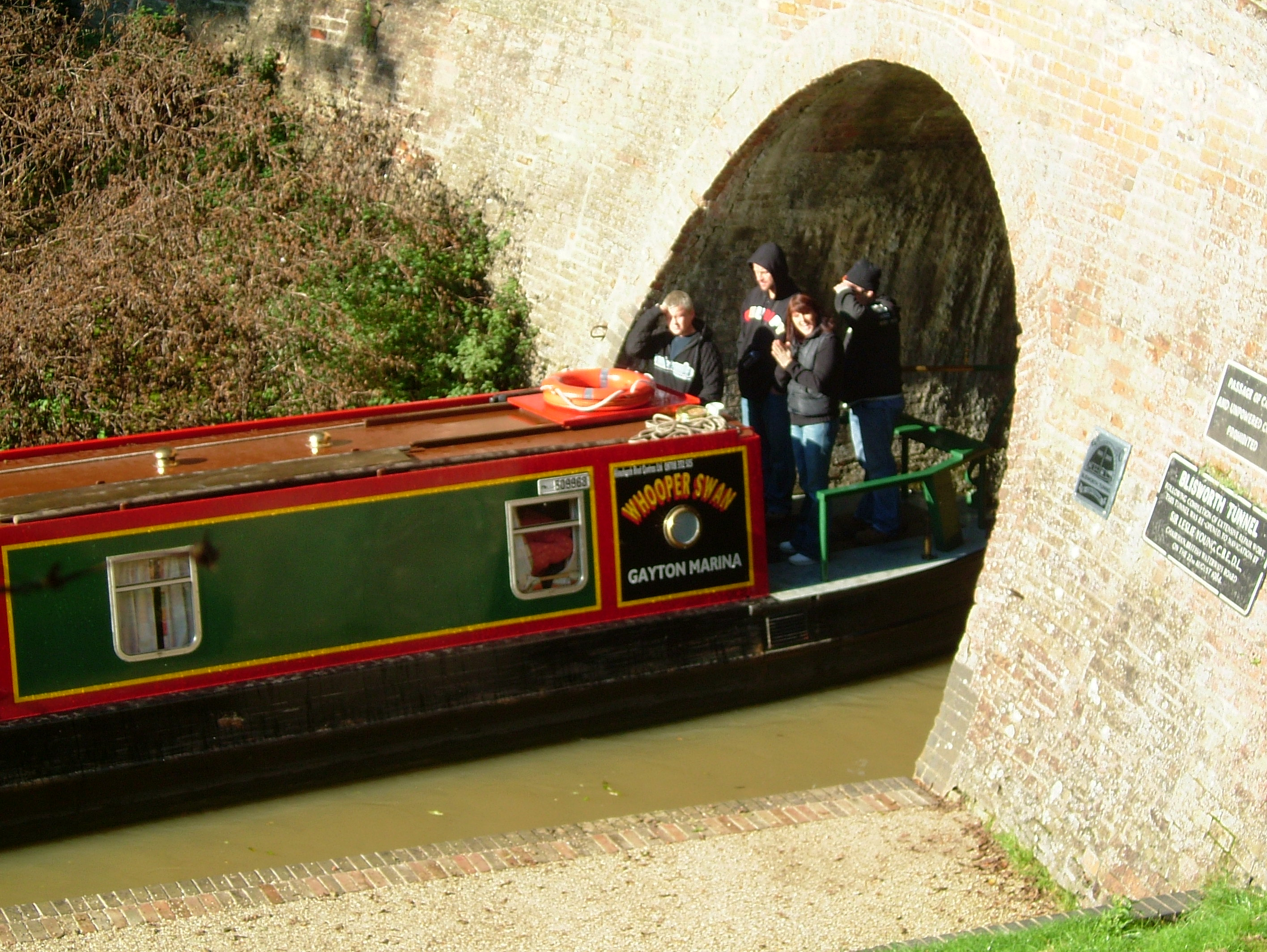
Narrowboat emerging from the south portal of the Blisworth Tunnel just north of Stoke Bruerne

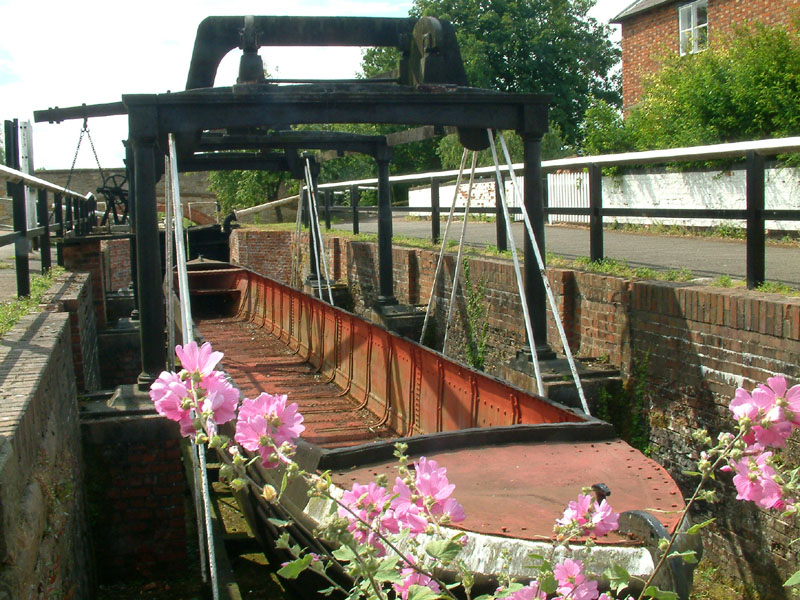
Boat-weighing machine at Stoke Bruerne, originally from the Glamorganshire Canal

The civil parish population at the 2011 Census was 373.

== History ==
Stoke Bruerne is mentioned in the Domesday Book of 1086 as "Stoche" meaning "an outlying farmstead or hamlet". The form "Stokbruer" is used in 1254 being a suffix by the "Briwere" family of the Manor House. The village contains many traditional stone and thatched cottages. It is situated on the Grand Union Canal.

The parish is currently governed as part of West Northamptonshire. Before local government changes in 2021 it was part of Tove Ward, named after the River Tove, of the district council of South Northamptonshire.

The nearby country estate of Stoke Park along Shutlanger Road is occasionally open to the public in August, but all that remains of the main house are the two east and west wings known as Stoke Park Pavilions.

In December 2008, the conservation project won the East Midlands' Royal Town Planning Institute (RTPI) Award, alongside Foxton Locks, another major canal restoration project in Leicestershire, near Market Harborough.

== Culture and tourism ==
=== Walks ===
Many public footpaths cross the area around Stoke Bruerne. One such walk, taking in Grafton Regis, was the subject of a Daily Telegraph article. Other walks in and around Northampton are mentioned in the County Council Right of way site.

=== Canal Museum ===
The village is home to one of the three museums owned and run by Canal & River Trust. The others are at Ellesmere Port and Gloucester Docks.

=== Blisworth tunnel ===
About half a mile north of the village is the south portal of Blisworth tunnel - accessible by a walk along the old towpath (on the eastern side of the canal - north of the village, the western side is either private property or inaccessible.) The tunnel is 3,075 yards (2,812 m) long and is the longest wide, freely navigable tunnel in Europe. The tunnel was awarded a Transport Trust 'Red Wheel' in recognition of its industrial heritage and importance on 22-August-2014 (30th anniversary of the reopening of the tunnel in 1984). The Red Wheel is on the blacksmith's forge in Stoke Bruerne.

=== Facilities ===
There are two canalside public houses, The Boat Inn, and The Navigation, both serving a variety of meals and drinks. There is a restaurant/takeaway, The Spice of Bruerne, various bed and breakfast facilities and tearooms. The village attracts many visitors all year round and especially during the summer months. There are parking restrictions at all times, except for residents, on village roads which are all marked with double yellow lines. There is, however, a pay and display car park close to the Museum (charge £3 or 50p after 6pm). The parking restrictions are strictly enforced. A variety of boat trips may be booked from the canalside. Most of the time there is plenty of activity on the canal with boats going through the locks regularly and plenty going in and out of the tunnel.

=== Cricket Club ===
The village has a cricket club with three sides competing in the Northamptonshire Cricket League, a Sunday side and a multiple junior sides. In 2014, Stoke Bruerne CC merged with a Northampton-based Spencer CC to form Spencer Bruerne Cricket Club.

== Conservation area consultation ==
In November 2007 the area of the village and surroundings, including Stoke Park, were the subject of an extensive conservation consultation by South Northants Council. Extensive additional documentation, including maps, pictures and historical documentation, is available from the South Northants Council's Planning website.

== Railway ==
Stoke Bruerne had its own railway station, part of the Stratford-upon-Avon and Midland Junction Railway (SMJR) and misnamed Stoke Bruern. This ran close to the village over Blisworth tunnel near the south portal. The station building has been converted to a private house and is along the road to Blisworth just outside the village. The line of the railway, and station platform, are still visible and the Blisworth road has a railway bridge still in position near the former station. The railway ran east to join the West Coast Main Line and then into Bedfordshire.

== Film ==
The village appears, with Blisworth, in the Ealing Studios film Painted Boats (1945), filmed at the end of World War II and directed by Charles Crichton.

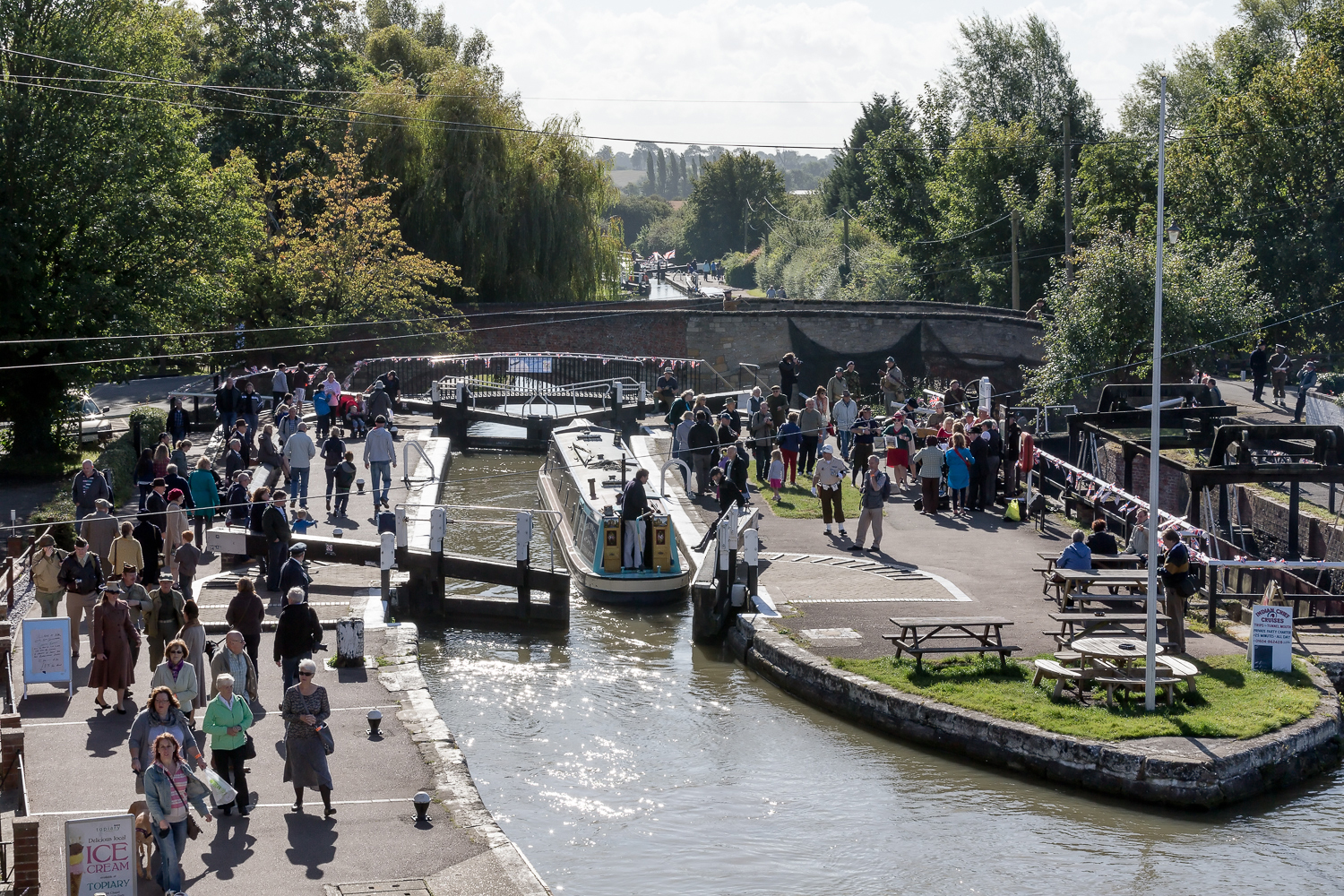
Fifth year of Bruerne's successful Village at War weekend

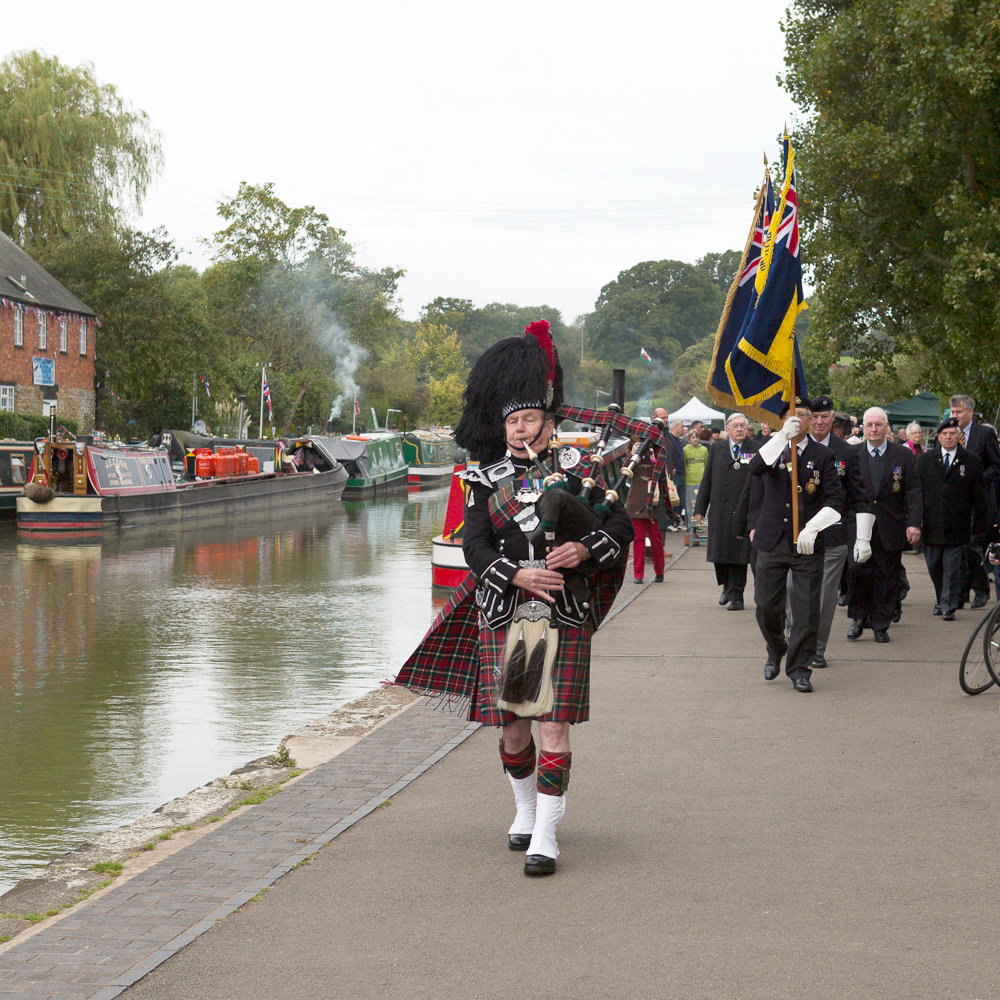
A Drumhead Service of Remembrance is held annually at Stoke Bruerne
