= Church of St James the Less, Sulgrave =

Coordinates: 52.1036°N 1.1883°W

St James the Less, Sulgrave
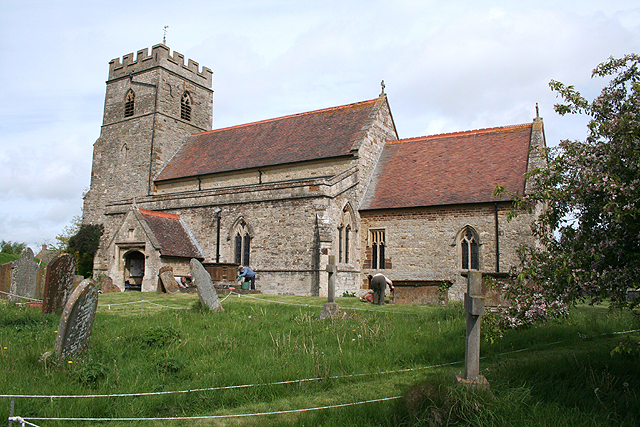
- St James the Less, Sulgrave

- Location within Northamptonshire
- Location: Sulgrave, Northamptonshire
- Country: England
- Denomination: Church of England
- Previous denomination: Roman Catholic
- Website: St James the Less, Sulgrave

Architecture
- Heritage designation: Grade II*
- Designated: 4 February 1969
- Style: Anglo-Saxon; Early English Gothic; Decorated Gothic; Perpendicular Gothic; Gothic Revival

Administration
- Province: Canterbury
- Diocese: Peterborough
- Archdeaconry: Northampton
- Deanery: Brackley
- Parish: Sulgrave

Clergy
- Vicar: Rev Christopher Whiteman

The Church of St James the Less, Sulgrave, is the Church of England parish church of Sulgrave, a village and civil parish about 5 miles (8 km) north of Brackley, Northamptonshire. The present church dates largely from the 13th and 14th centuries and is recorded in the National Heritage List for England as a designated Grade II* listed building.

== Architecture ==
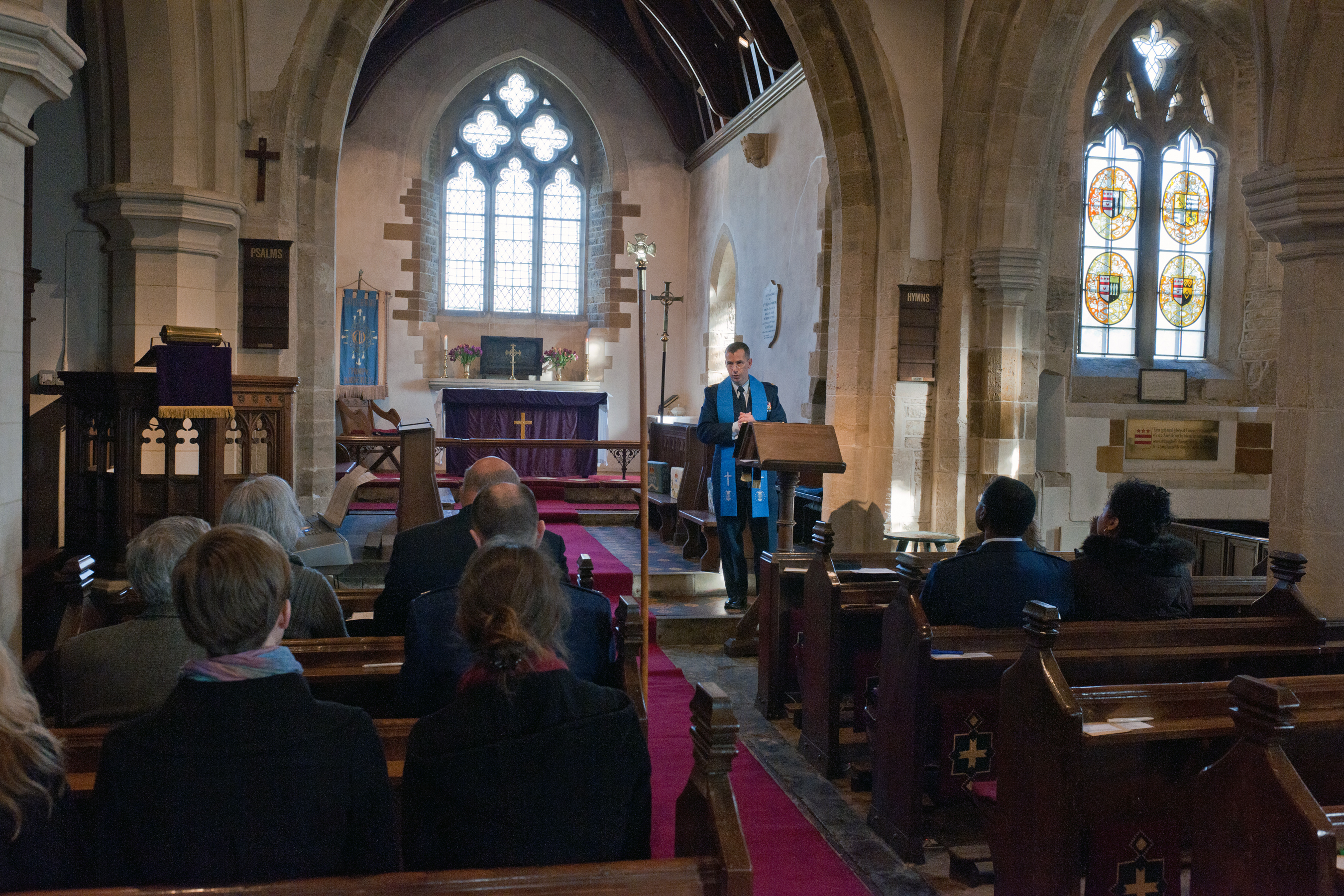
Interior of the nave, looking east towards the chancel. A USAF chaplain is addressing a small congregation.

Sulgrave has had a church since the Anglo-Saxon era, although not on the current site. An earlier stone church is believed to have stood about 1/4-mile (400 m) north of the present one, on higher ground near the windmill.

The church on the present site was built in the 13th century, when the Cluniac Priory of St Andrew, Northampton held the advowson. At least some material from the original church was used in the rebuilding. Most notable is a triangular-headed doorway, characteristic of Anglo-Saxon architecture, that has been re-set as the west door of the west tower. This may date from the 10th century. The bell-openings to the top stage of the tower and the trefoiled lancet windows to the ground stage are Early English Gothic features that date it to the 13th century.

The tower had a spire, but it collapsed in the 14th century. A record from about 1340 reports the church as "destroyed", and 20 carts being at "Helmydene" (Helmdon, 2 miles (3 km) southeast of Sulgrave) to collect stone for its repair. Helmdon stone is a fine freestone and was certainly the best building stone in the area.

The work for which Helmdon stone was supplied may therefore have included the south aisle. This was added in the middle of the 14th century and retains all of its original Decorated Gothic windows. The four-bay arcade between the south aisle and the nave is Perpendicular Gothic and therefore somewhat later. Also in the south aisle is a squint to the high altar in the chancel, and a 14th- or 15th-century piscina, both of which were installed when the aisle had a side altar. The squint was blocked after the Reformation but reopened in 1885. The south door is 14th century. Outside it is the south porch, which is 16th-century Elizabethan with a characteristically Tudor four-centred arch. Over it is a datestone with the initials ER and year 1564. Elizabeth I visited Northampton that year so the initials may commemorate her visit.

The chancel has two south windows: the more easterly is Decorated Gothic and therefore earlier; the more westerly is Perpendicular Gothic. The baptismal font is octagonal and may date from the 1660s.

In 1840 the nave walls were raised by about 6 feet (1.8 m), the ancient oak roof was replaced with a new deal one and the windows were reduced in height, all to accommodate the installation of galleries to increase the church's capacity. In 1885 the galleries were removed and the oak roof was restored. In the same year to compensate for the loss of the galleries the north aisle was added, re-using the 14th-century north doorway. The three-light east window of the chancel is also 19th-century Gothic Revival.

The two-light east window of the south aisle includes four stained glass coats of arms of successive generations of the Washington family. Each is surrounded by strapwork in white and yellow glass and they are probably 16th-century.

== Furnishings ==
St James' has an ancient wooden chest, hewn from a solid oak trunk and said to be 14th-century. It has two compartments and is bound with closely spaced iron bands.

In the south aisle is the Washington Pew, a 17th-century pew that was installed when the Washington family held Sulgrave Manor.

In 1929 a wooden screen was installed separating the ground stage of the tower from the nave to create a vestry. It was funded by the Women's Committee of the George Washington Institute and made by craftsmen of Broadway, Worcestershire.

The Colonial Dames of America presented the church with a pipe organ in 1930. This was replaced with a new one in 1975.

== Monuments ==
Under the floor of the east end of south aisle is the tomb Amee Washington who died in 1564, and her husband Lawrence who died in 1584. The tomb is covered by a 6 feet (1.8 m) slab of Hornton ironstone with monumental brasses set into it. There were originally six brasses in the set: a pair of 21-inch (530 mm) figures of Lawrence and Amee Washington; a pair of smaller brasses, one their four sons, and one of their seven daughters; a brass of a family coat of arms and one with an inscription. The brasses of Amee Washington, the family coat of arms and the inscription are missing. In 1889 the two brasses of the children and the head of the brass of Lawrence Washington were stolen. They were recovered in 1923 and reinstalled in 1924 but no-one was ever charged with their theft.

In 1659 the Washingtons sold Sulgrave Manor, and in about 1673 it passed to a member of the Hodges family. On the south wall of the south aisle above the Washington pew are three neoclassical wall monuments to members of the Hodges family. The largest and most ornate is that to the brothers John and Rev Moses Hodges, both of whom died in 1724. It is of grey and white marble and has fluted pilasters.

== Bells and clock ==
In 1552 during the Edwardine Reformation the church was listed as having four bells in the west tower plus a sanctus bell. The churchwardens, John Humfrey and John Mayo, had sold one of the bells for £16 to pay for road and ford repairs in the parish. The buyers, Thomas Stuttesbury and Lawrence Washington, had so far paid £6, and the bell remained in the belfry until the balance was paid.

None of the bells listed in 1552 survives, but their metal may have been re-used in casting the present ones. The Sanctus bell was medieval, but in 1806 it was recast by John Briant of Hertford. One of the Newcombe family of bellfounders of Leicester cast the present third bell in 1610 and the fourth in 1612. Edward Hall of Drayton Parslow in Buckinghamshire cast the fifth bell in 1744. Matthew Bagley of Chacombe cast the second bell in 1769. John Briant of Hertford cast the tenor bell in 1808, making a ring of five. Gillett & Johnston of Croydon recast all five of the ring in 1928. This was increased to six when John Taylor & Co of Loughborough cast the present treble bell in 1932.

The present turret clock in the west tower was made and installed in 1928.

== Benefice ==
The parish is part of the benefice of Culworth, with Sulgrave and Thorpe Mandeville, and Chipping Warden, with Edgcote and Moreton Pinkney. It is in the deanery of Brackley, the archdeaconry of Northampton, and the Diocese of Peterborough.

== Future ==
The church hall is to be refurbished and upgraded with a grant from HS2 Ltd, which will include the installation of accessible toilets.

== Sources ==
- Anonymous (1995). "The Parish Church of St. James the Less". The Chronicles of a Country Parish.
- Parry, Edward (1986–87). "Helmdon Stone". Northamptonshire Past and Present. VII (4). Northamptonshire Record Society: 258–269.
- Pevsner, Nikolaus; Cherry, Bridget (revision) (1973) [1961]. Northamptonshire. The Buildings of England (2nd ed.). Harmondsworth: Penguin Books. p. 421. ISBN 0-14-071022-1.
- Serjeantson, R.M.; Adkins, W.R.D., eds. (1906). "The Priory of St. Andrew, Northampton". A History of the County of Northampton. Victoria County History. Vol. 2. Westminster: Archibald Constable & Co. pp. 102–109.
