= Thorpe Mandeville =

Village in Northamptonshire, England

Coordinates: 52.100°N 1.224°W

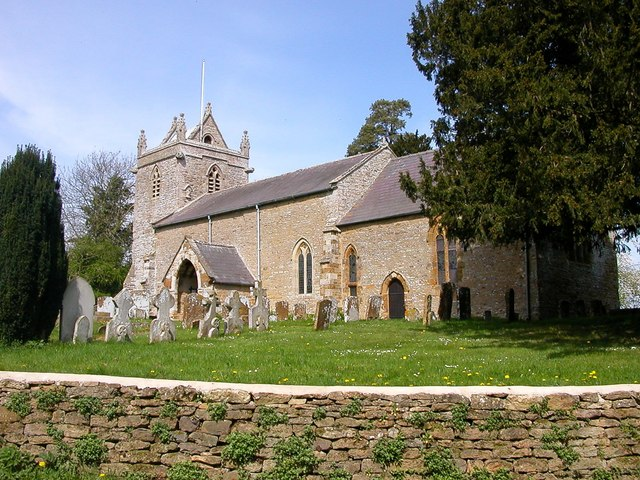
- St John the Baptist parish church

- Location within Northamptonshire
- Population: 327 (2011 Census)
- OS grid reference: SP5344
- Civil parish: Thorpe Mandeville
- Unitary authority: West Northamptonshire
- Ceremonial county: Northamptonshire
- Region: East Midlands
- Country: England
- Sovereign state: United Kingdom
- Post town: Banbury
- Postcode district: OX17
- Dialling code: 01295
- Police: Northamptonshire
- Fire: Northamptonshire
- Ambulance: East Midlands
- UK Parliament: Daventry
- Website: Thorpe Mandeville Today

Thorpe Mandeville is a village and civil parish in West Northamptonshire, England about 6 miles (10 km) northeast of Banbury in neighbouring Oxfordshire. The hamlet of Lower Thorpe is just north of the village.

The village's name means 'Outlying farm/settlement'. The village was held by Richard de Amundevill in 1252.

The population of the parish has grown slowly over the centuries. It was recorded as 137 in the 1801 Census, 178 in the 1991 Census, 194 in the 2001 Census and 327 (including Edgcote) in the 2011 Census.

== Manors ==
The Domesday Book of 1086 records the village as Thorp. "Mandeville" is a corruption of Amundeville. Richard de Amundeville was lord of the manor in the 13th century.

In 1346 a house and 9 acres (3.6 ha) of land at Thorpe Mandeville were listed amongst the estates of the Augustinian priory at Chacombe.

The Kirton family lived at Thorpe Mandeville manor house from 1554 to 1685. Thomas Kirton (1537–1601) of Thorpe Mandeville was Common Serjeant of London. The current ironstone manor house was built early in the 18th century. The south front of the house is of five bays and is in the style of Thomas Archer. It is a Grade II* listed building.

== Parish church ==
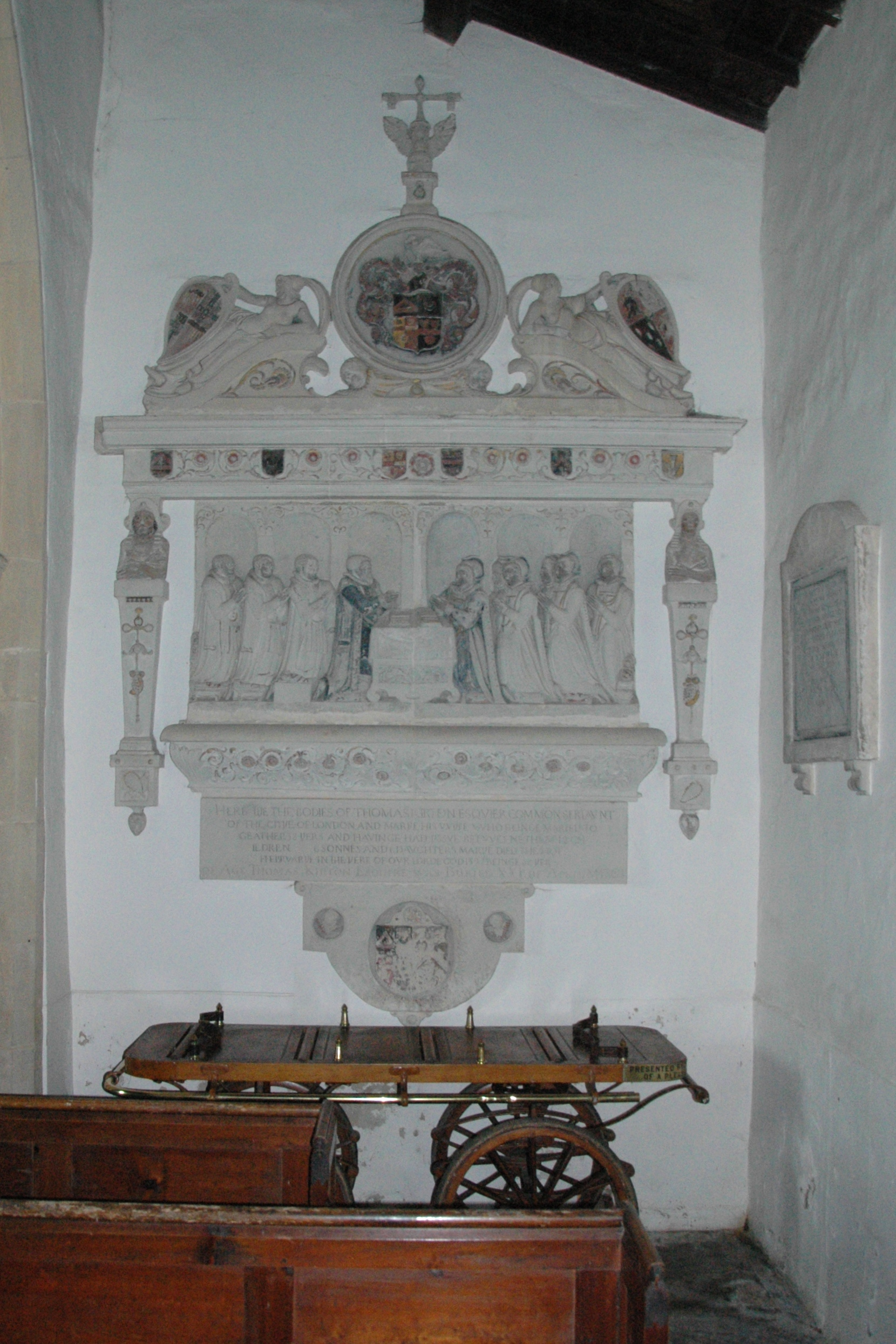
Late Elizabethan monument in the parish church to Sir Thomas and Lady Margaret Kirton

By the end of the 11th century Thorpe Mandeville had a parish church, which was included in the early endowments to a Cluniac priory of the Abbey of La Charité-sur-Loire that had been founded at Preston Capes in 1090 and moved to Daventry shortly thereafter.

The present Church of England parish church of Saint John the Baptist, built of local ironstone, dates largely from the early part of the 14th century. The north aisle has Decorated Gothic windows and an arcade of three bays. The chancel has windows dating from about 1300, the middle of the Decorated Gothic period. The chancel was restored in 1872 under the direction of the architect Albert Hartshorne.

High on the east wall of the west tower is a small stone relief of a man under a hood mould. On the north wall of the north aisle is a 14th-century painting of Saint Christopher carrying Jesus. On the west wall of the north aisle is a monument to Sir Thomas Kirton (died 1601) and his wife Margaret (died 1597). The church is a Grade I listed building.

The tower has a saddleback roof and three bells. Henry I Bagley of Chacombe cast the second bell in 1636. John Briant of Hertford cast the treble bell in 1790. Robert Taylor, who had foundries at Oxford and St Neots, cast the tenor bell in 1826.

The parish is now part of the benefice of Culworth with Sulgrave and Thorpe Mandeville and Chipping Warden with Edgcote and Moreton Pinkney.

== Social and economic history ==
Thorpe Mandeville had a Church of England school that was built in 1864 and enlarged in 1898. It was closed in 1967 and the building has been the village hall since 1970.

The Hill, about 1 mile (1.6 km) west of Thorpe Mandeville village, is a house designed by C.F.A. Voysey and built in 1897–98 for a member of the Hope Brooke family.

In 1900 the Great Central Railway completed a line linking its new main line at Culworth Junction with the Great Western Railway at Banbury Junction. The link line passed through the northern part of Thorpe Mandeville parish. In 1911 the Great Central opened Chalcombe Road Halt 2.5 miles (4 km) west of Thorpe Mandeville and in 1913 it added Eydon Road Halt at Culworth 1.5 miles (2.4 km) north of Thorpe Mandeville. British Railways closed both halts in 1956 and closed the line between Culworth Junction and Banbury Junction in 1966.

The planned High Speed 2 railway line will pass through the area. The House of Lords Select Committee on the bill to construct the line reported that the hamlet of Lower Thorpe would be virtually destroyed by the construction of a viaduct.

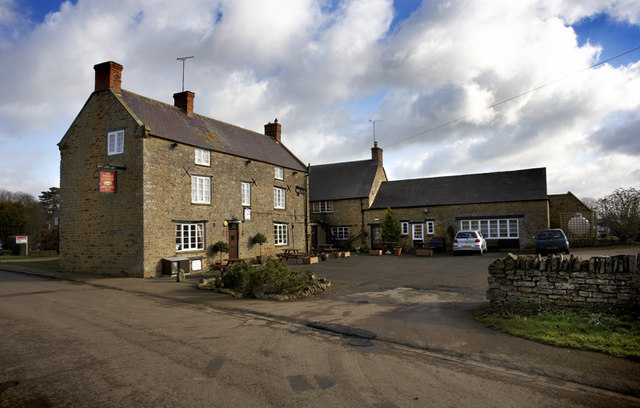
The Three Conies

== Amenities ==
The village has a public house, the Three Conies, that is controlled by the Hook Norton Brewery. Thorpe Mandeville is on an important former drovers' road called Banbury Lane. The Three Conies was built in the 17th century as a drovers' inn, providing overnight accommodation for drovers and their livestock.
