= Culworth =

Village in Northamptonshire, England

Coordinates: 52.118°N 1.206°W

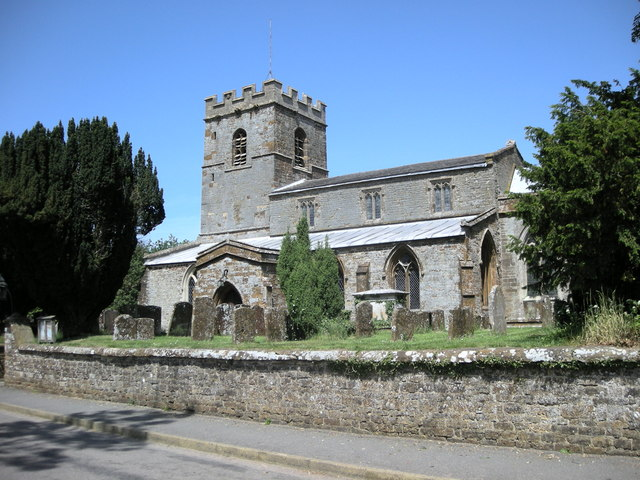
- St Mary the Virgin parish church

- Location within Northamptonshire
- Population: 445 (2011 Census)
- OS grid reference: SP5446
  - London: 73 miles (117 km)
- Civil parish: Culworth
- Unitary authority: West Northamptonshire
- Ceremonial county: Northamptonshire
- Region: East Midlands
- Country: England
- Sovereign state: United Kingdom
- Post town: Banbury
- Postcode district: OX17
- Dialling code: 01295
- Police: Northamptonshire
- Fire: Northamptonshire
- Ambulance: East Midlands
- UK Parliament: Daventry
- Website: Culworth Village

Culworth is a village and civil parish about 7 miles (11 km) north of Brackley in West Northamptonshire, England. Culworth is also about 7 miles (11 km) northeast of the north Oxfordshire town of Banbury.

The village stands on the brow of a hill about 540 feet (160 m) above sea level. The 2011 Census recorded the parish's population as 445.

== History ==
=== Toponymy ===
The villages name means 'Cula's enclosure'.

=== Roman coin ===
A third-century Roman coin from the brief reign of the Roman emperor Quintillus was found in the parish before 1841.

=== Manor ===
Berry Hill, just north of the parish church, is a medieval ringwork, built probably late in the 11th century. It is a scheduled monument. On its southwest side, part of its circular ditch was cut away in the 19th century to make the garden of the Old Rectory, but otherwise it survives intact. There are similar ringworks at Sulgrave, Weedon Lois and Weston.

William de Culworth was sheriff of Hertfordshire and Constable of Hertford Castle in 1230 and 1234.

The D'Anvers family held the manor of Culworth by 1643, when Samuel D'Anvers (1611–1683) was created a baronet. The D'Anvers Baronetcy became extinct with the death of Sir Michael D'Anvers, 5th Baronet, in 1776.

The Old Manor is a 17th-century courtyard house, enlarged in the 18th century. Sir John D'Anvers, 3rd Baronet (1673–1744) had a large mansion built, but it has not survived. There is a newer Danvers House that is reputed to include materials from the mansion, and certainly includes window frames that may date from about 1700.

=== Church and chapel ===
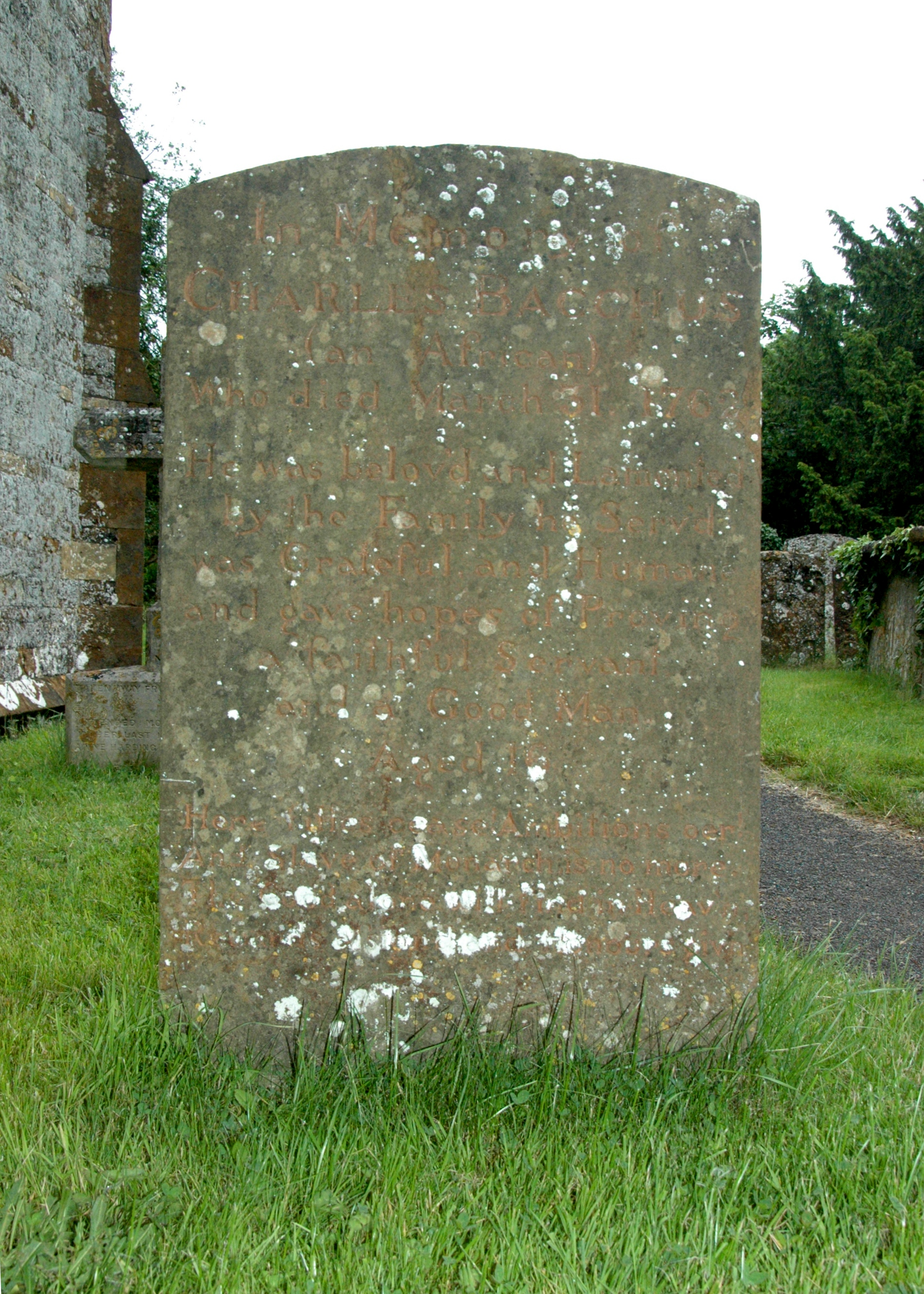
Gravestone of Charles Bacchus, an African servant who died in 1762 aged 16

The Church of England parish church of Saint Mary the Virgin has north and south aisles with three-bay Norman arcades dating from about 1200. Late in the 13th century the arcades were lengthened and the lower part of the west tower was built. The upper part of the tower is Perpendicular Gothic and therefore was built later. The chancel was rebuilt in 1840 and the building was altered and refitted in 1880 to designs by the architect E.F. Law of Northampton. The church is a Grade II* listed building.

By 1254 the Augustinian Canons Ashby Priory held "the spiritualities" of St. Mary's parish. Early in the 14th century there was a dispute between Roger de Mussynden and Prior Adam of the Priory for possession of the advowson, which was settled in 1325 in favour of the Priory.

A marble monument inside the church to the D'Anvers baronets was erected in 1790. Graves in the churchyard include that of Charles Bacchus, an African servant who died in 1762 at the age of 16.

The tower has a ring of five bells. One of the Newcombe family of bell-founders of Leicester cast the oldest bell in 1612. Henry I Bagley of Chacombe cast the tenor bell in 1636. Other bells were cast by Edward Hemins of Bicester in 1741 and John Briant of Hertford in 1806. John Taylor & Co of Loughborough cast the treble bell in 1931. St. Mary's has also a sanctus bell that was cast by an unidentified founder in about 1700.

St Mary's parish is a member of the Benefice of Culworth with Sulgrave and Thorpe Mandeville and Chipping Warden with Edgcote and Moreton Pinkney.

The Rectory is a Gothic Revival house built in 1854. It was enlarged and altered in 1869 to designs by E.F. Law.

East of Danvers House is a Moravian Chapel that was built in 1810.

=== Social and economic history ===
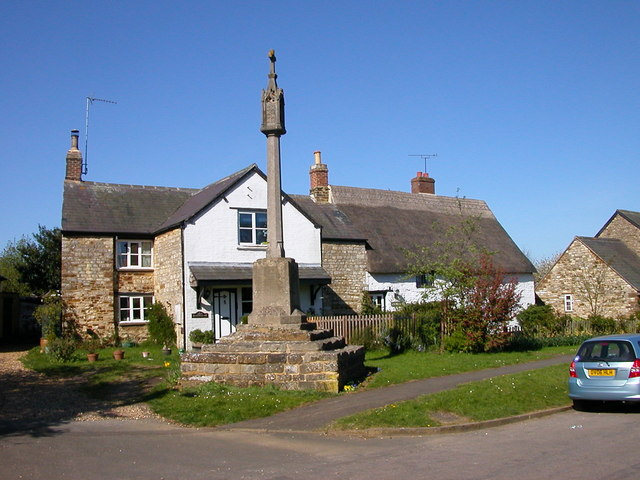
Culworth war memorial: a 20th-century Gothic Revival shaft and top on the steps and base of a former Medieval preaching cross or market cross

The parish's common fields were enclosed by agreement in 1612. Most of the ridge and furrow pattern of the common fields is still visible.

Culworth is at the crossing point of two former drovers' roads, the Welsh Road and Banbury Lane.

The village has shrunk, leaving earthworks at its northwest and southeast ends marking the sites of former houses. On the stream south of Culworth house is a pond with a dam 5 feet (1.5 m) high. It was a mill pond, but the watermill has been lost.

After the extinction of the Danvers baronetcy Meriel Danvers, a spinster of the family, endowed Danvers Free School in 1789 and it was built in about 1795. It is now Culworth Church of England Primary School.

Westhill House is 17th-century with 18th-century additions, and has a 17th-century barn and granary.

The Great Central Main Line from Nottingham Victoria to London Marylebone was built through the neighbouring parish of Moreton Pinkney. In 1899 a station was opened in Moreton Pinkney parish, 1 1/2 miles (2.4 km) from Culworth and only 3/4-mile (1.2 km) from Moreton Pinkney village. However, there was already a Morton Pinkney railway station so the Great Central Railway called the new station Culworth.

In 1900 the Great Central opened a branch from Culworth Junction on the main line just over a mile north of the station to Banbury. It passed through Culworth parish just west of the village and in 1913 the Great Central opened a halt for the village. As the company already had a Culworth railway station it called the new halt Eydon Road Halt.

British Railways closed the halt in 1956 and Culworth station in 1958. The 1963 The Reshaping of British Railways report recommended that BR close the line through Eydon Road, which it did in 1966.

=== 'Culworth Gang' ===
The Culworth Gang of highwaymen were active in south Northamptonshire and surrounding areas from the mid-1760s until 1787. Originally a gang of poachers trying to feed their families, they later turned to more serious crimes of burglary, highway robbery, and the rustling of farm animals.

Their reign of terror came to an end when two of the gang, Richard Law and William Pettifer, stayed over in a tavern in Towcester, and the innkeeper found some of the gang's masks and other ‘Highwayman’ apparel in a bag. A constable was called who decided to put the pair under surveillance. Following a further robbery, a posse was raised to round up the other gang members; as a result seven members went to trial where five were convicted and sentenced to death by hanging.

John Smith the elder, Richard Law, William Pettifer and William Bowers were hanged on the Racecourse Northampton on 4 August 1787. William Abbot's sentence was commuted to transportation to Australia.

William Smith, Benjamin Smith and William Tyrell were all released. John Smith junior, Thomas Malsbury, and John Tack all absconded before arrest. Tyrell and John Smith junior were later hanged at Warwick for highway robbery in 1788.

== Amenities ==
Culworth has one public house, the Red Lion. Also, The Forge Coffee shop, The Red Lion Barn shop and the Butchers.

== Sources ==
- Page, W.H., ed. (1912). "The borough of Hertford: Castle, honour, manors, church and charities". A History of the County of Hertford. Victoria County History. Vol. 3. pp. 501–511.
- Pevsner, Nikolaus; Cherry, Bridget (1973) [1961]. Northamptonshire. The Buildings of England. Harmondsworth: Penguin Books. pp. 171–172. ISBN 0-14-071022-1.
- RCHME, ed. (1982). An Inventory of the Historical Monuments in the County of Northamptonshire. Vol. 4, Archaeological Sites in South-West Northamptonshire. London: Her Majesty's Stationery Office. pp. 39–40.
- Serjeantson, R.M.; Adkins, W.R.D., eds. (1906). "The Priory of Canons Ashby". A History of the County of Northampton. Victoria County History. Vol. 2. Archibald Constable & Co. pp. 130–133.
