= Woodford Halse railway station =

Former GCML Railway Station in Northamptonshire

Coordinates: 52.1681°N 1.2115°W

Woodford Halse
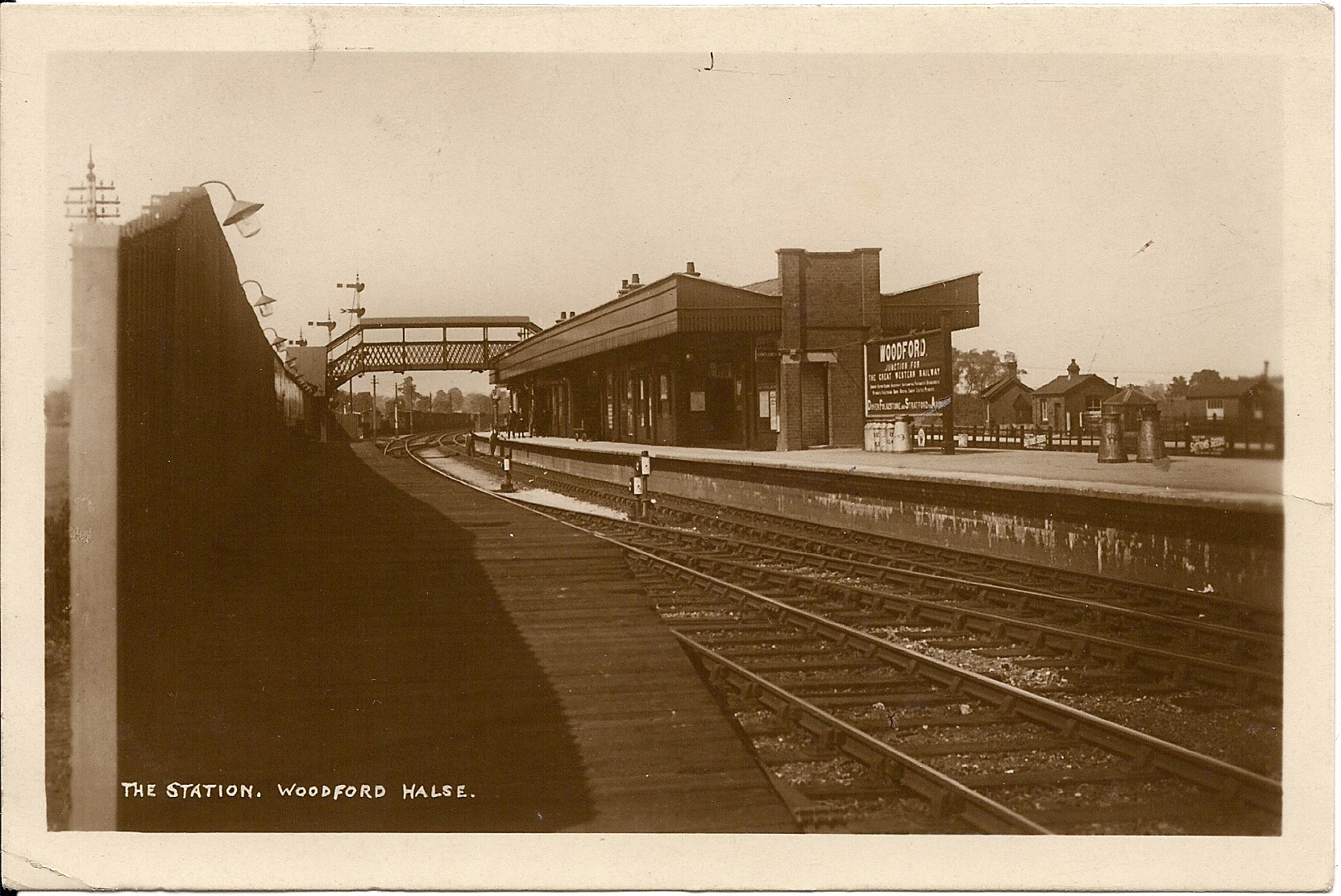
- Woodford Halse station in 1929

General information
- Location: Woodford Halse, Northamptonshire; England
- Grid reference: SP540525
- Platforms: 3

Other information
- Status: Disused

History
- Original company: Great Central Railway
- Pre-grouping: Great Central Railway
- Post-grouping: London and North Eastern Railway; London Midland Region of British Railways

Key dates
- 15 March 1899: Opened (Woodford and Hinton)
- 1 November 1948: Renamed (Woodford Halse)
- 5 September 1966: Closed
Location

Woodford Halse railway station stood on the Great Central Railway (GCR) main line, the last main line to be built from the north of England to London. The station opened with the line on 15 March 1899 under the name Woodford and Hinton and served the adjacent villages of Woodford Halse to the east and Hinton to the west, both in Northamptonshire. The station was renamed Woodford Halse on 1 November 1948.

== History ==
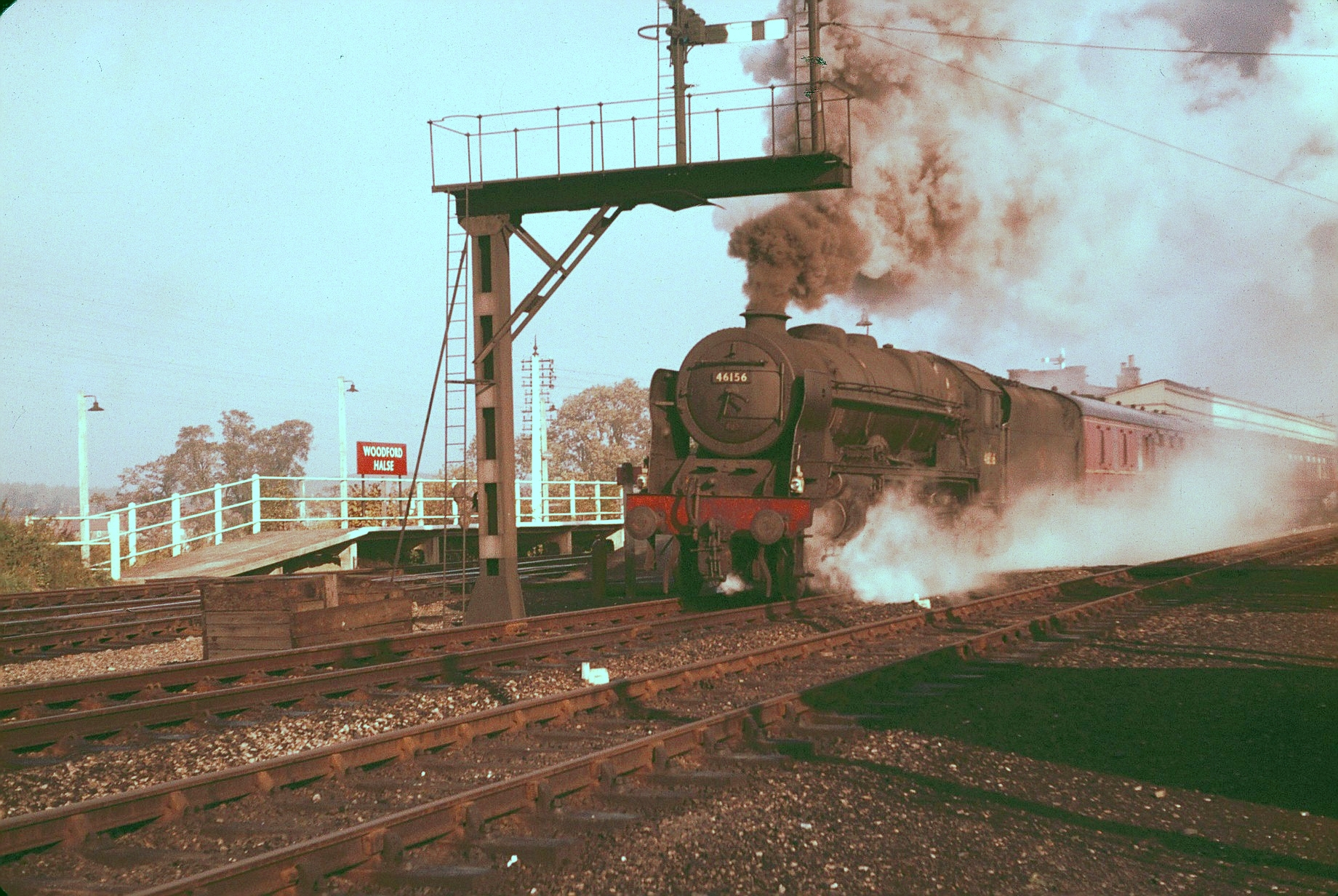
Royal Scot 6156 at Woodford Halse railway station

The village of Woodford Halse became notable for the role it played as an important railway centre. Originally it had seemed destined not to have a railway at all, as the nearest stations were at Byfield (about two miles west), and Moreton Pinkney (three miles south-east), both on the East and West Junction Railway (later part of the Stratford-upon-Avon and Midland Junction Railway), opened in July 1873, and no other lines seemed likely to be built in such a thinly populated area. However, in the late 1890s the village found itself on a major trunk route, the Great Central Railway's London Extension.

The station was a variation on the standard island platform design typical of the London Extension, and was the less common "embankment" type reached from a roadway (Station Road), that passed beneath the line. It also differed from the usual design in that, since it served what was effectively a four-way junction, it was provided with a more extensive range of platform buildings and facilities beneath a longer awning.

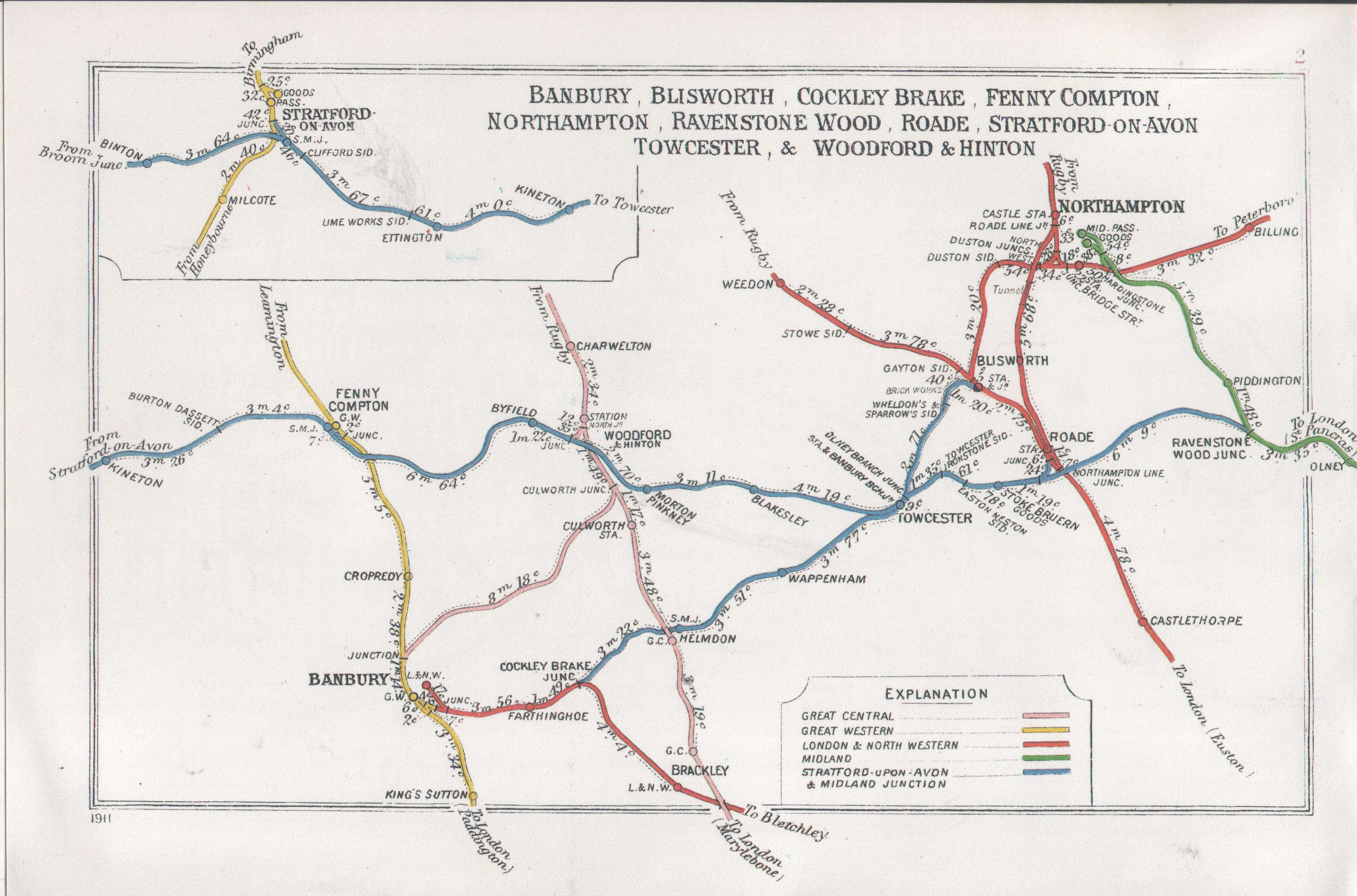
A 1911 Railway Clearing House map of railways in the vicinity of Woodford Halse (centre, in pink, shown here as Woodford & Hinton)

The station was situated near Woodford Halse North Curve Junction linking the GCR with the Stratford-upon-Avon and Midland Junction Railway (SMJ) route between Stratford-upon-Avon and Towcester, and a separate platform was provided on the west side for SMJ trains, a timber structure later replaced by a concrete slab construction although still referred to as the "wooden platform". Further south however was the more important Culworth Junction, divergence point for a stretch of line 8.25 miles (13.28 km) in length linking the GCR with the Great Western Railway at Banbury, enabling some extensive and varied cross-country workings to take place.

=== Motive Power Depot ===
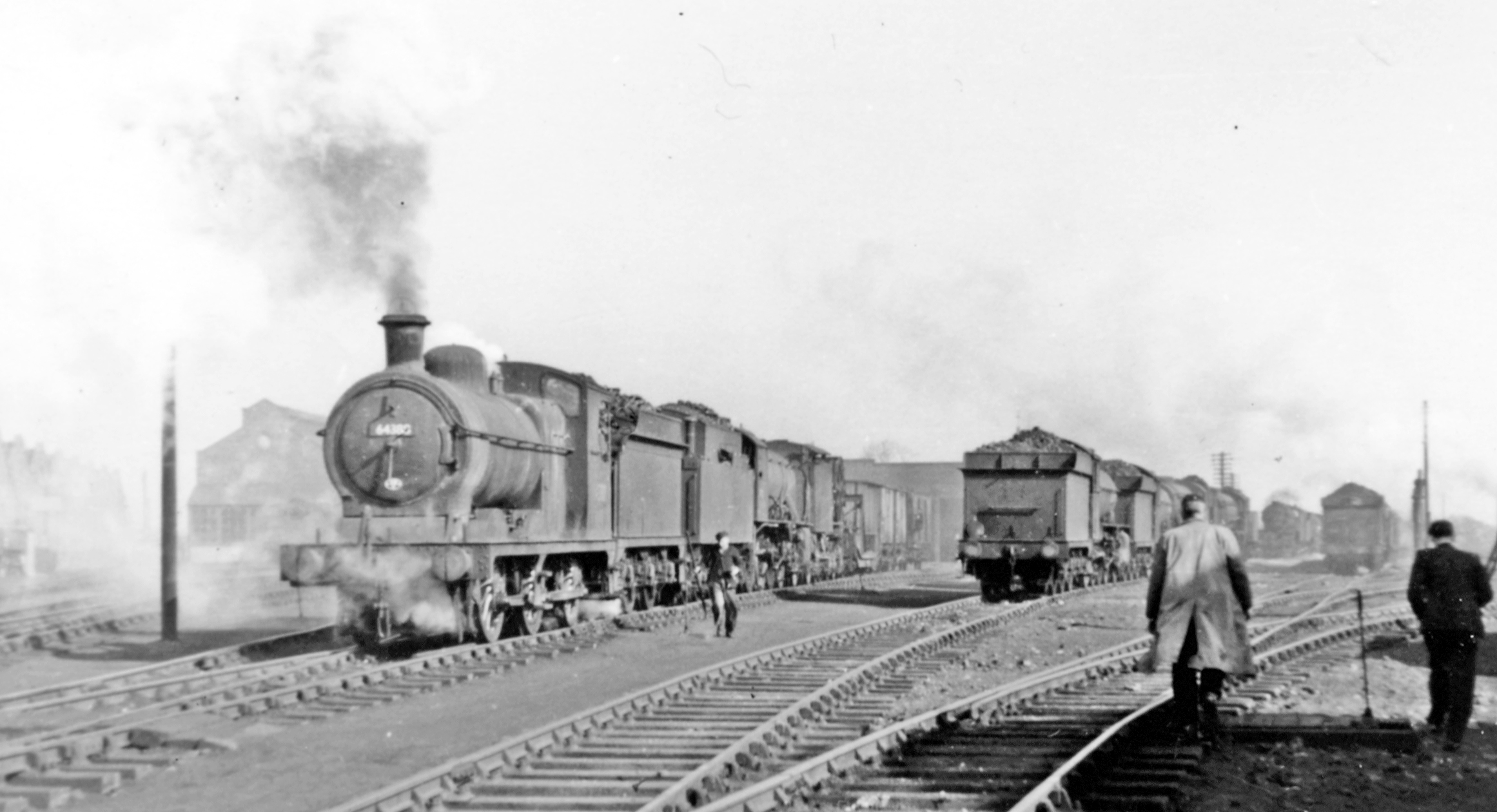
Woodford Halse Locomotive Yard in 1953

To the north of the station, a major locomotive depot housing up to 30 locos with space to double that number, also wagon and sheet repair shops, plus extensive marshalling yards, were also sited at Woodford Halse (plans to construct carriage sheds there too were dropped). The originally intended location for these facilities was Brackley until local opposition forced a change in plans and the site moved to Woodford Halse. Much of this was located on top of a vast embankment covering some 35 acres (14.2 hectares), formed mainly from spoil taken from Catesby Tunnel a few miles to the north. The infant River Cherwell flowed (and still flows) beneath this embankment in a north-east to south-west direction in a culvert approx. 165 yards (150 metres) in length. Several roads containing 136 terraced dwellings to house the railway workers were built on the east side of the embankment, together with a street of shops. This gave a small previously rural village an industrial look that seemed alien to its surroundings. The Woodford-cum-Membris parish's population eventually peaked at just under 2,000, at which time Woodford Halse had its own cinema and railway workers' social club.

=== Closure ===
The GCR was, at times, a busy route and the depot and yards at Woodford Halse were a hive of activity, but not busy enough to ensure survival when the Beeching Axe closures of the 1960s took place. The Stratford & Midland Junction had already closed on 7 April 1952 although the Woodford North to West Curve which gave access to it had actually gone earlier, on 31 May 1948. On 5 April 1965 the marshalling yards closed, and on 5 September 1966, most of the GCR was closed completely, including all remaining lines converging on Woodford Halse.

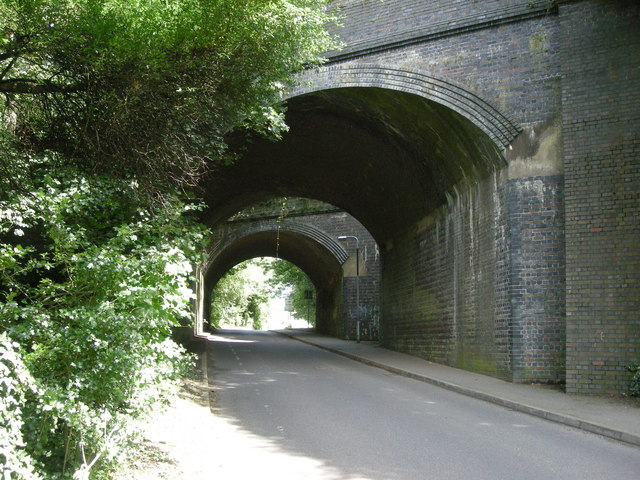
Bridges of the former Great Central main line at Woodford Halse, Northamptonshire

All tracks and most railway buildings were later cleared leaving behind a wasteland (in 1971 one building withstood four attempts by the Royal Marines to blow it up - they only succeeded in removing its roof). The population fell sharply too, as many former railway workers and their families left the area, but new developments in later decades have increased it (the parish's population was 3,493 at the 2011 UK census, slightly up on the 2001 UK census figure of 3,456).

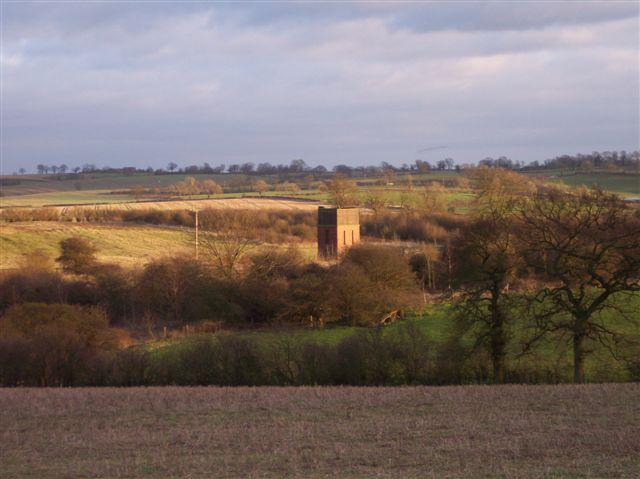
Charwelton water tower which fed the troughs at the north end of the Woodford Halse railway station New Yard

Woodford Halse is once again a quiet place, though visitors can still see evidence of its railway past. The twin bridges over Station Road can still be seen; below and between them is the bricked-up station entrance, but up on top everything has gone - the station site itself is now a temporary winter home for travelling showmen. To the north, where the depot and yards were sited, is now a tree plantation and the Great Central Way Industrial Estate, currently being enlarged to create the Manor Business Park. Further north still, one solitary railway structure survives amid fields: the water tower that served the Charwelton Watertroughs.

== Routes ==
Preceding station	Disused railways	Following station
Culworth; Line and station closed	Great Central Railway; London Extension	Charwelton; Line and station closed
Eydon Road Halt; Line and station closed	Great Central Railway; Banbury branch	Charwelton; Line and station closed
Byfield; Line and station closed	GCR & SMJR	Terminus

== Proposal ==
In August 2000, Chiltern Railways suggested reopening the former Great Central Main Line through Woodford Halse and Rugby Central to a parkway station in Leicestershire. This proposal is a "secondary aspiration" of Chiltern's franchise agreement. However, Chiltern stated in 2013 that the plan is "no longer active".

== Model ==
A model of the station and the goods yards exists in the social club building near the site. The building itself was purchased by BR for use as a recreational building for railway workers. The models includes Woodford Halse station in 1930s condition, and a model of Byfield station is under construction.

== See also ==
- List of British Railways shed codes
