= Woodford Halse Nature Reserve =

Nature reserve in the United Kingdom

Coordinates: 52.161°N 1.215°W

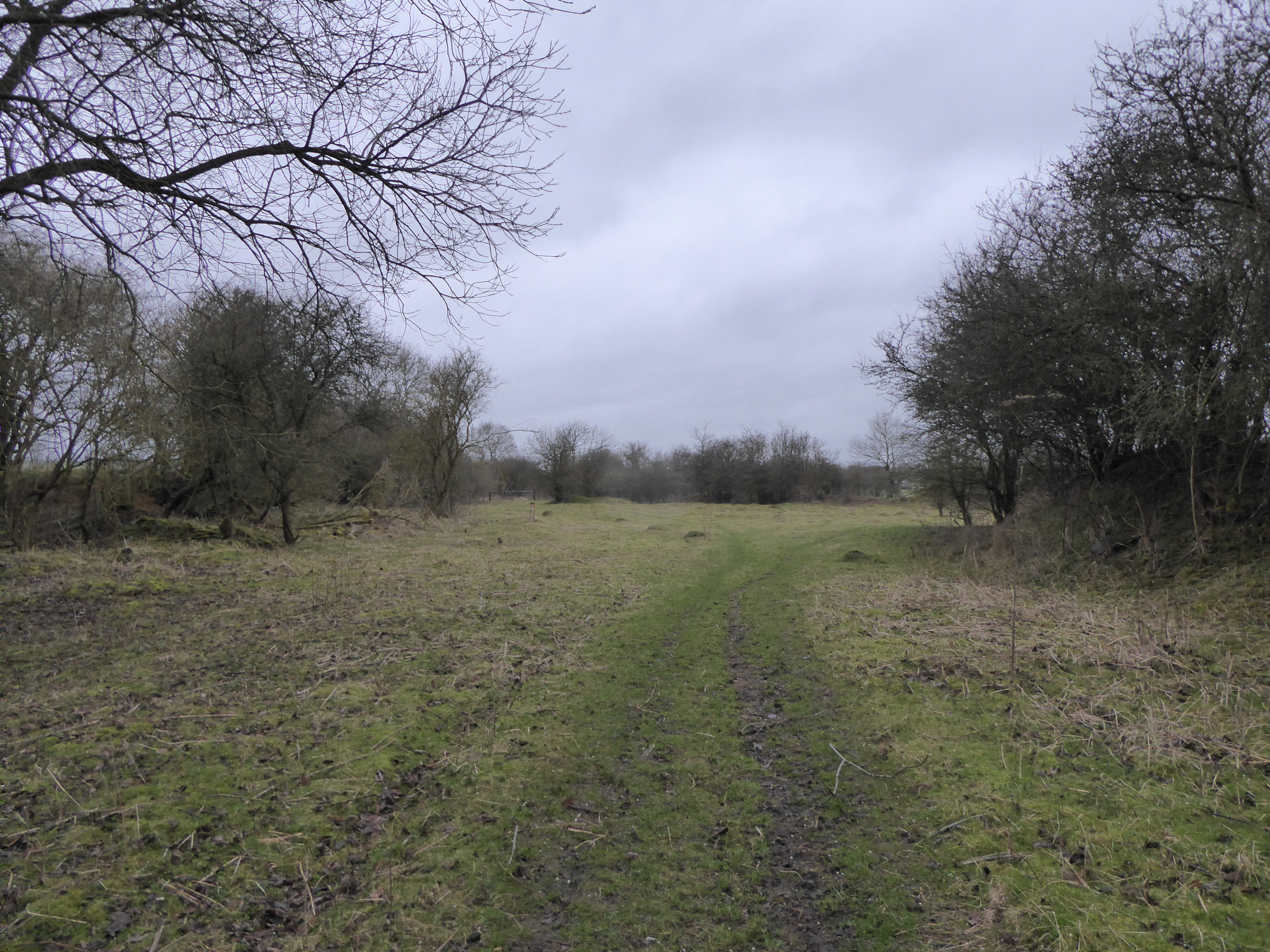
- Interactive map of Woodford Halse Nature Reserve
- Type: Nature reserve
- Location: Woodford Halse, Northamptonshire
- OS grid: SP 538 517
- Area: 5.7 hectares (14 acres)
- Manager: Wildlife Trust for Bedfordshire, Cambridgeshire and Northamptonshire

Woodford Halse Nature Reserve is a 5.7-hectare (14-acre) nature reserve south of Woodford Halse in Northamptonshire. It is managed by the Wildlife Trust for Bedfordshire, Cambridgeshire and Northamptonshire.

This site in two disused railway cuttings has some plant species which are rare in Northamptonshire. Over 100 flower species have been recorded, including knapweed and devil's bit scabious. There are birds such as fieldfare, redwing, wheatear, lesser whitethroat, yellowhammer and linnet.

There is access by a footpath from Woodford Halse.
