= Chalcombe Road Halt railway station =

Former railway station in England

Coordinates: 52.09488°N 1.28616°W

Chalcombe Road Halt
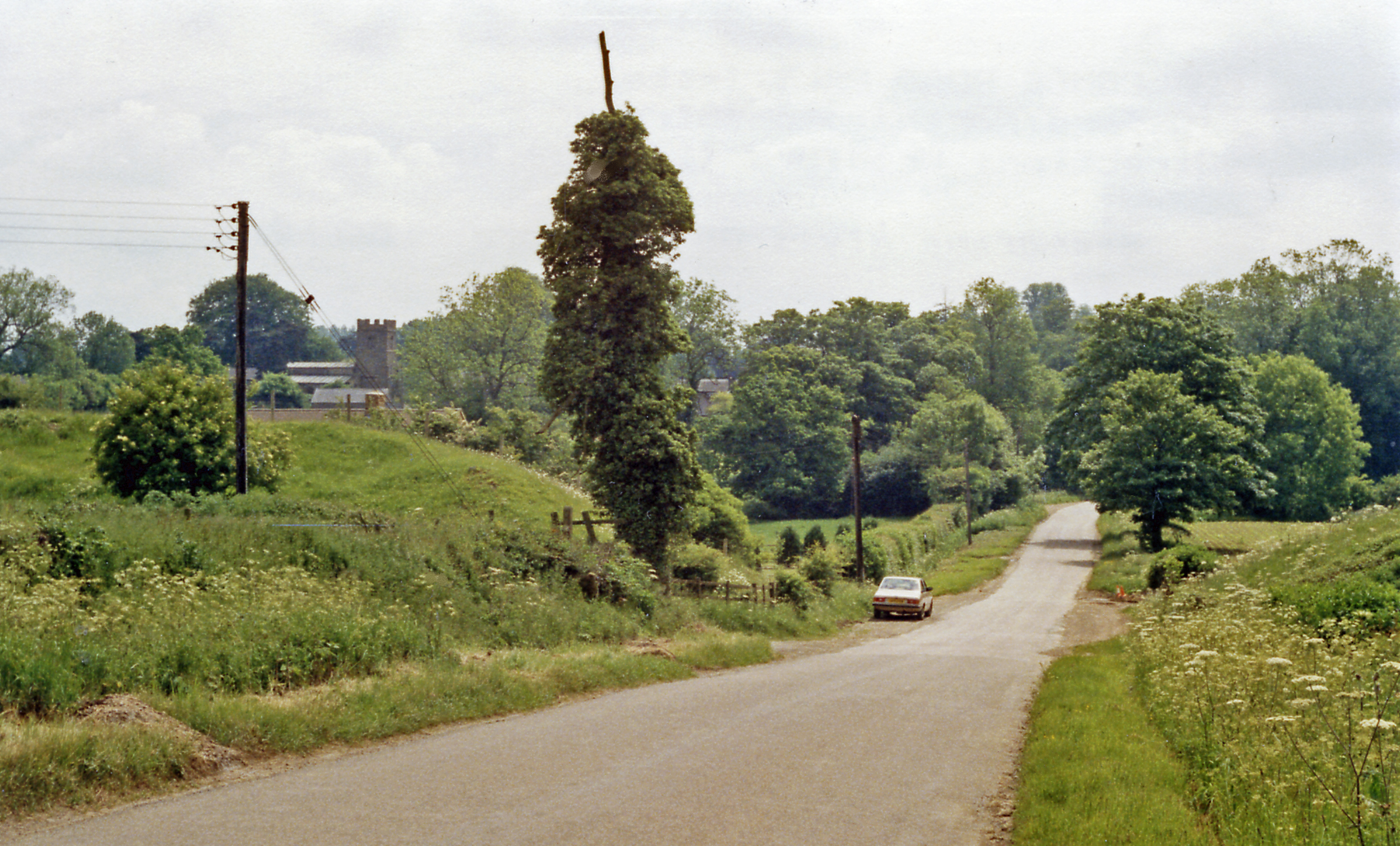
- Location in 1988

General information
- Location: Chacombe, Cherwell; England
- Grid reference: SP490442
- Platforms: 2

Other information
- Status: Disused

History
- Original company: Great Central Railway
- Pre-grouping: Great Central Railway
- Post-grouping: London and North Eastern Railway; London Midland Region of British Railways

Key dates
- 1 June 1900: Culworth Junction-Banbury line opened
- 17 April 1911: Station opened
- 6 February 1956: Station closed
- 4 September 1966: Culworth Junction-Banbury line closed
Location

Chalcombe Road Halt was a railway station on the link line between the Great Central Railway and the Great Western Railway's Birmingham - London line, leaving the Great Central at Culworth Junction to connect with Banbury Junction. The station, which served the nearby Northamptonshire village of Chacombe, opened in 1911 and closed in 1956.

== History ==
In 1893, the Manchester, Sheffield and Lincolnshire Railway (MS&LR) obtained legal powers in the Manchester, Sheffield and Lincolnshire Railway (Extension to London, &c.) Act 1893 (56 & 57 Vict. c. i) for the extension of its line from Annesley in Nottingham to London. The final section of the extension saw the line connect with Metropolitan Railway's line at Quainton Road before returning to MS&LR metals at Finchley Road and continuing to Marylebone. Negotiations with the Metropolitan regarding running rights over its line came to deadlock prompting Sir William Pollitt, the MS&LR's general manager, to reach agreement with the Great Western Railway in March 1896 for a route to London via Banbury which would avoid the Metropolitan.

The link line, which ran for a distance of 8 1/4 miles (13.3 km), was opened without formality on 1 June 1900. The route had no intermediate stations but soon became an important freight route with 60,796 wagons exchanged between the MS&LR (now known as the Great Central) and the Great Western within the first six months of operation; by 1904 this figure had risen by 50%. Two passenger services each way were initially provided by the Great Western, with the Great Central later supplementing this service with three additional trains in each direction. The link was subsequently used for cross-country services, including Aberdeen to Penzance, Oxford to Leicester and Newcastle to Bournemouth.

The line crossed the Northamptonshire–Oxfordshire county boundary five times between Eydon Road Halt and Banbury; at its closest approach to Chacombe, it was on the Oxfordshire side of the boundary, within the parish of Cropredy. A small halt (situated between Chacombe and Coton Farm) was opened on 17 April 1911 and named Chalcombe Road Halt. Serving a rural area, the halt closed on 6 February 1956, and the line itself closed on 4 September 1966.

Preceding station	Disused railways	Following station
Banbury; Line closed, station open	Great Central Railway; Banbury branch	Eydon Road Halt; Line and station closed
