= Morton Pinkney railway station =

Former railway station in Northamptonshire, England

Coordinates: 52.144009°N 1.160867°W

Morton Pinkney

General information
- Location: Moreton Pinkney, West Northamptonshire; England
- Grid reference: SP575498
- Platforms: 2

Other information
- Status: Disused

History
- Original company: East and West Junction Railway
- Pre-grouping: Stratford-upon-Avon and Midland Junction Railway
- Post-grouping: London, Midland and Scottish Railway; London Midland Region of British Railways

Key dates
- 1 July 1873: Opened
- 1 August 1877: Closed
- 22 February 1885: Reopened
- 7 April 1952: Closed
Location

Morton Pinkney (also known as Morton Pinkney for Sulgrave) was a railway station on the Stratford-upon-Avon and Midland Junction Railway (SMJ) which served the Northamptonshire village of Moreton Pinkney between 1873 and 1952. It was situated not far from Sulgrave Manor, the ancestral home of George Washington's family.

== History ==
A line from Greens Norton junction near Towcester to Stratford-upon-Avon and the junction with the Great Western Railway's Honeybourne branch line was first authorised in June 1864, but due to a lack of funds it took a further nine years for the line, built by the East and West Junction Railway (E&WJ), to be fully open to traffic. A station was opened at Moreton Pinkney, a Northamptonshire village 11 1/2 miles (18.5 km) from Blisworth. As with other E&WJ stations, Morton Pinkney had a passing loop with two platforms and a single goods siding without a goods shed. Goods handled included milk collection and coal deliveries; in addition, as many as 40 loads of cattle were dispatched on weekly Tuesday marketdays, the railway company laying on special trains to run to Blisworth and Broom. To the west of the small brick station building lay a 12-lever signal box which was switched out at night to create a long section from Woodford West junction and Blakesley when services were signalled in both directions on the Up line.

A special gating crossing existed near the station for the use of local huntsmen, a key being provided to the local Master of Foxhounds. In 1912, the Stratford-upon-Avon and Midland Junction Railway, which had amalgamated with the E&WJ in 1908, agreed to cover all drains along the line and to replace barbed wire with ordinary wire in order to minimise the risk of injury to horse and hound. In an attempt to boost passenger traffic, the station began to appear as Morton Pinkney for Sulgrave in timetables from January 1913, the railway company hoping that the mention of Sulgrave, the location of the home of George Washington's ancestors, would encourage tourists to use the line. Passenger traffic continued to tail off and the station was finally closed in 1952, though the line through the station remained open for freight trains between Woodford West junction and Blisworth until 7 February 1964.

== Routes ==
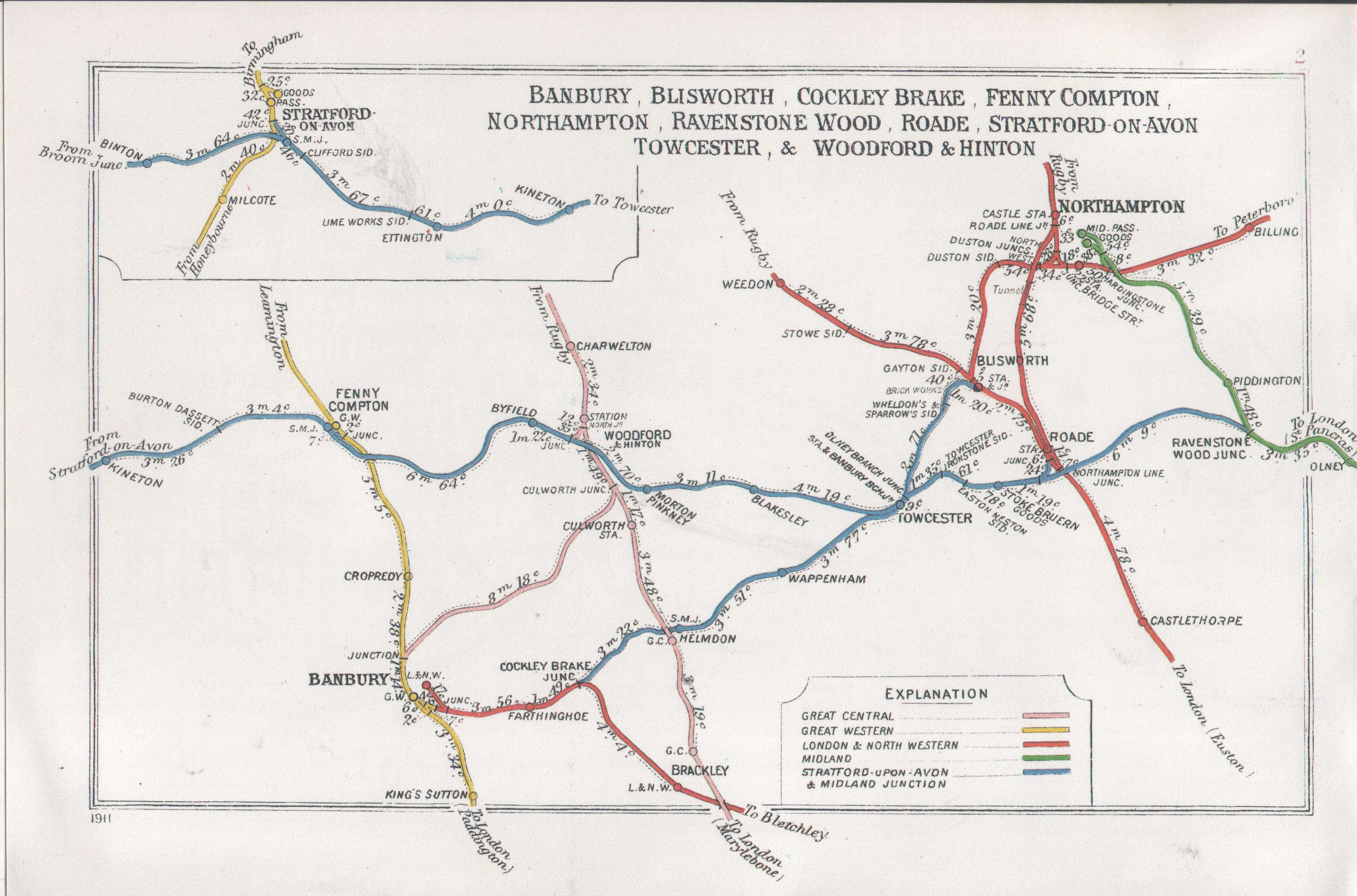
A 1911 Railway Clearing House map of railways in the vicinity of Moreton Pinkney (centre, in blue)

Preceding station	Disused railways	Following station
Byfield	SMJR; East and West Junction Railway	Blakesley

== Present day ==
The station site has been redeveloped into light industrial use and the station buildings have been removed. The gate leading to the site does however carry a sign bearing the station's name.
