= Eydon Road Halt railway station =

Former railway station in England

Coordinates: 52.1201°N 1.2171°W

Eydon Road Halt
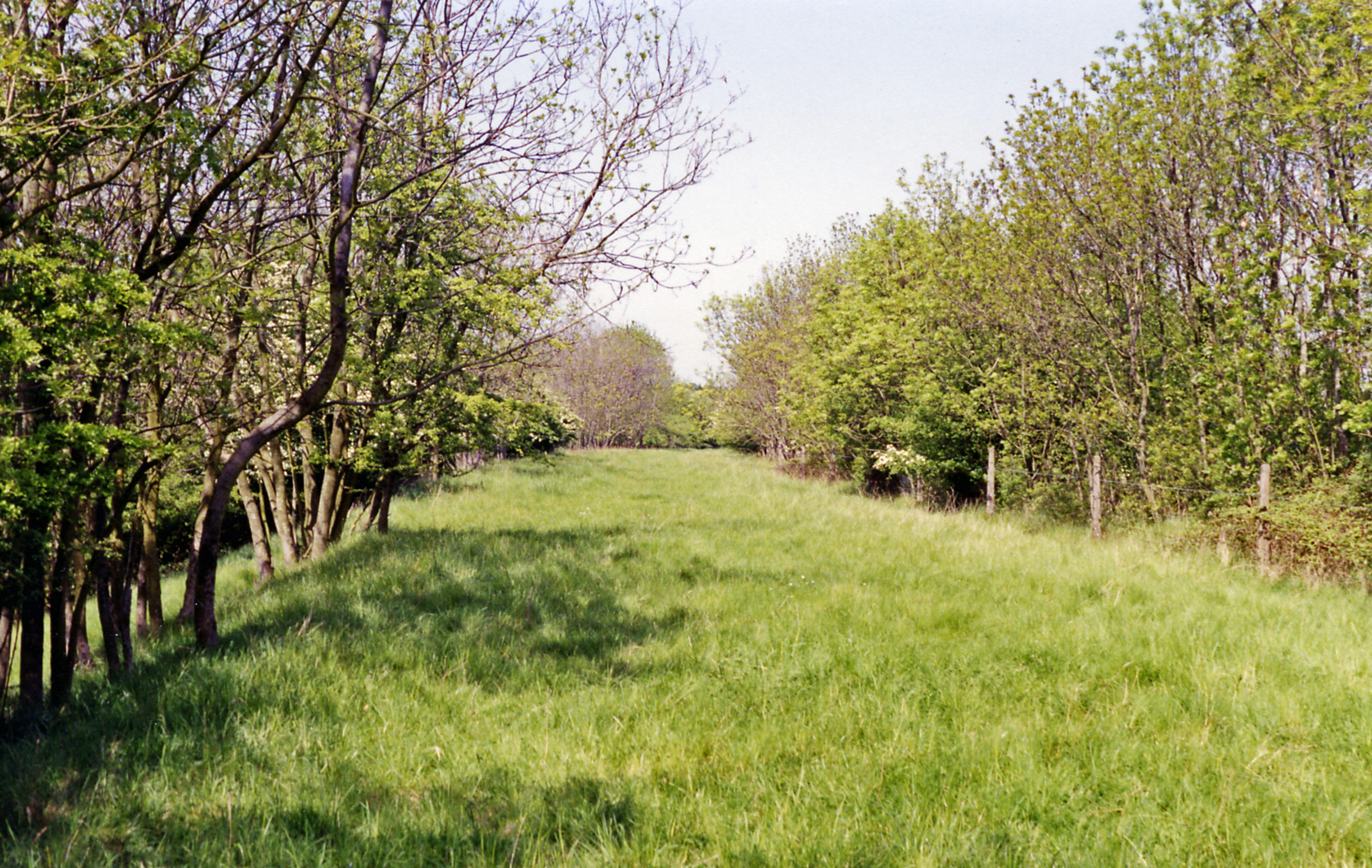
- Site of the halt (1992)

General information
- Location: Eydon, West Northamptonshire; England
- Grid reference: SP537472
- Platforms: 2

Other information
- Status: Disused

History
- Original company: Great Central Railway
- Pre-grouping: Great Central Railway
- Post-grouping: London and North Eastern Railway; London Midland Region of British Railways

Key dates
- 1 October 1913: Opened
- 2 April 1956: Closed
Location

Eydon Road Halt was a railway station on the link line between the Great Central Railway and the Great Western Railway's Birmingham - London line, leaving the Great Central at Culworth Junction to connect with Banbury Junction. The station opened in 1913 and closed in 1956.

== History ==
In 1893, the Manchester, Sheffield and Lincolnshire Railway (MS&LR) obtained legal powers in the Manchester, Sheffield and Lincolnshire Railway (Extension to London, &c.) Act 1893 (56 & 57 Vict. c. i) for the extension of its line from Annesley in Nottingham to London. The final section of the extension saw the line connect with Metropolitan Railway's line at Quainton Road before returning to MS&LR metals at Finchley Road and continuing to Marylebone. Negotiations with the Metropolitan regarding running rights over its line came to deadlock prompting Sir William Pollitt, the MS&LR's general manager, to reach agreement with the Great Western Railway in March 1896 for a route to London via Banbury which would avoid the Metropolitan.

The link line, which ran for a distance of 8 1/4 miles (13.3 km), was opened without formality on 1 June 1900. The route had no intermediate stations but soon became an important freight route with 60,796 wagons exchanged between the MS&LR (now known as the Great Central) and the Great Western within the first six months of operation; by 1904 this figure had risen by 50%. Two passenger services each way were initially provided by the Great Western, with the Great Central later supplementing this service with three additional trains in each direction. The link was subsequently used for cross-country services, including Aberdeen to Penzance, Oxford to Leicester and Newcastle to Bournemouth.

In October 1913, a halt was opened on the line at Eydon Road near Culworth and was in fact closer to the village than the Culworth station on the Great Central's main line, which was nearer Moreton Pinkney. Serving a rural area, the halt closed in April 1956, and the last services to use the line ran in September 1966.

Today nothing remains of the halt at its former site, but one of its wooden platform shelters was rescued and can be seen today on an allotment behind the Social Club at Woodford Halse.

Preceding station	Disused railways	Following station
Chalcombe Road Halt; Line and station closed	Great Central Railway; Banbury branch	Woodford Halse; Line and station closed
