= Byfield railway station =

Former railway station in Northamptonshire, England

Coordinates: 52.17088°N 1.24143°W

Byfield
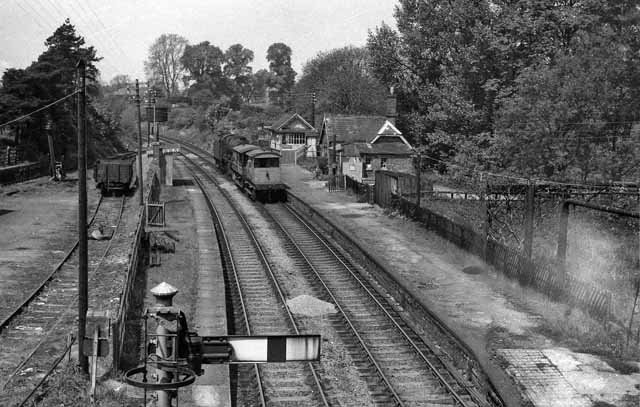
- Remains of the station in 1963

General information
- Location: Byfield, West Northamptonshire; England
- Platforms: 2

Other information
- Status: Disused

History
- Original company: Stratford-upon-Avon and Midland Junction Railway
- Pre-grouping: Stratford-upon-Avon and Midland Junction Railway
- Post-grouping: London, Midland and Scottish Railway

Key dates
- 1 July 1873: Station opens
- 1 August 1877: Station closes
- 22 February 1885: Station reopens
- 7 April 1952: Station closes
Location

Byfield railway station was a railway station serving Byfield in the English county of Northamptonshire.

== History ==
The line was opened by the East and West Junction Railway between Stratford-upon-Avon and Towcester in 1873. It was not very successful and in 1877 the two trains a day in each direction were discontinued. However, in 1899 the London extension of the Great Central Railway was opened through Woodford Halse which brought extra traffic. Great Central services reached Byfield via Woodford South Curve which was built at the same time. Bradshaw's timetable for August 1899 shows the 5.20pm from Marylebone terminating at Byfield, where it arrived at 7.36pm, 11 minutes after calling at Culworth. The curve was officially closed on 22 October 1900, but the rails remained in-situ for many years afterwards although the points were disconnected.

The line was also helped by a partial reorganisation in 1908 and its merger into the Stratford-upon-Avon and Midland Junction Railway The group of lines carried on unsteadily until grouping in 1923 when they became part of the London Midland and Scottish Railway By 1905 there were four trains off the Great Central line and two Woodford to Stratford services.

However demand reduced until in 1946 there was one morning through train each way, and one each way between Towcester and Byfield. The station closed on 5 April 1952, with freight finishing on 1 March 1965,

The design of the station buildings was virtually the same as all the others on the line, with two platforms serving a passing loop in the otherwise single line. There was a single line siding with a goods shed and a timber signal box. To avoid having a crossing, the station was built close to an overbridge carrying the A361 road.

The signal box's main function was to operate the ETS token system, although there was a facility to switch Byfield box out and operate a long block. Today, virtually all trace of the line and the station has disappeared

== Remains ==
A single platform which is partly buried, and the foundations for the old goods shed which are in a severe state of decay, are all that remains of the railway station.

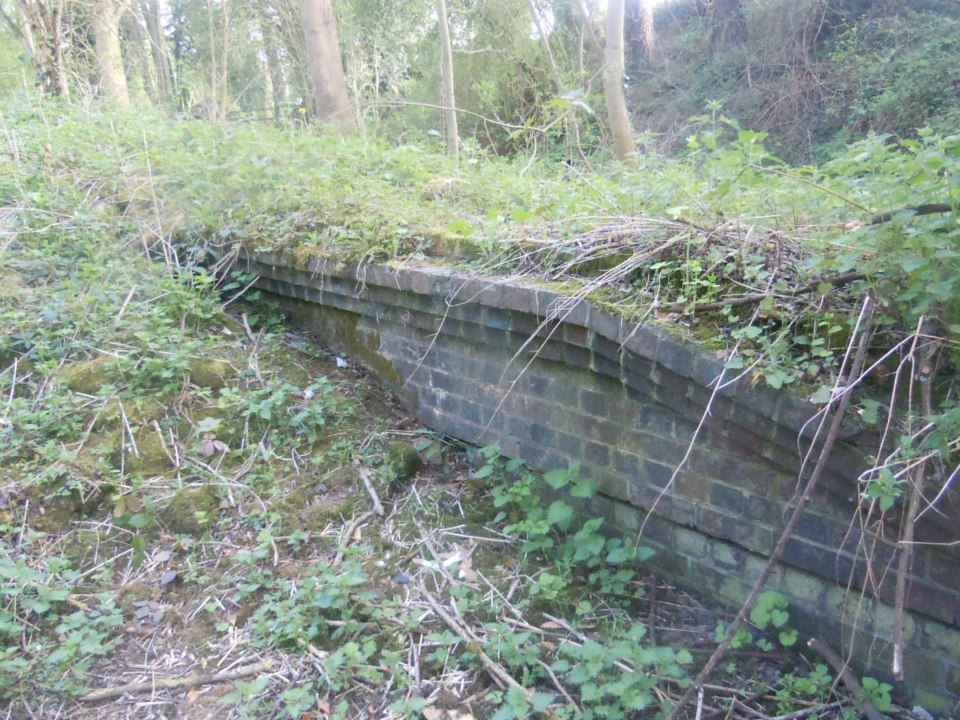
Byfield station platform remains

== Routes ==
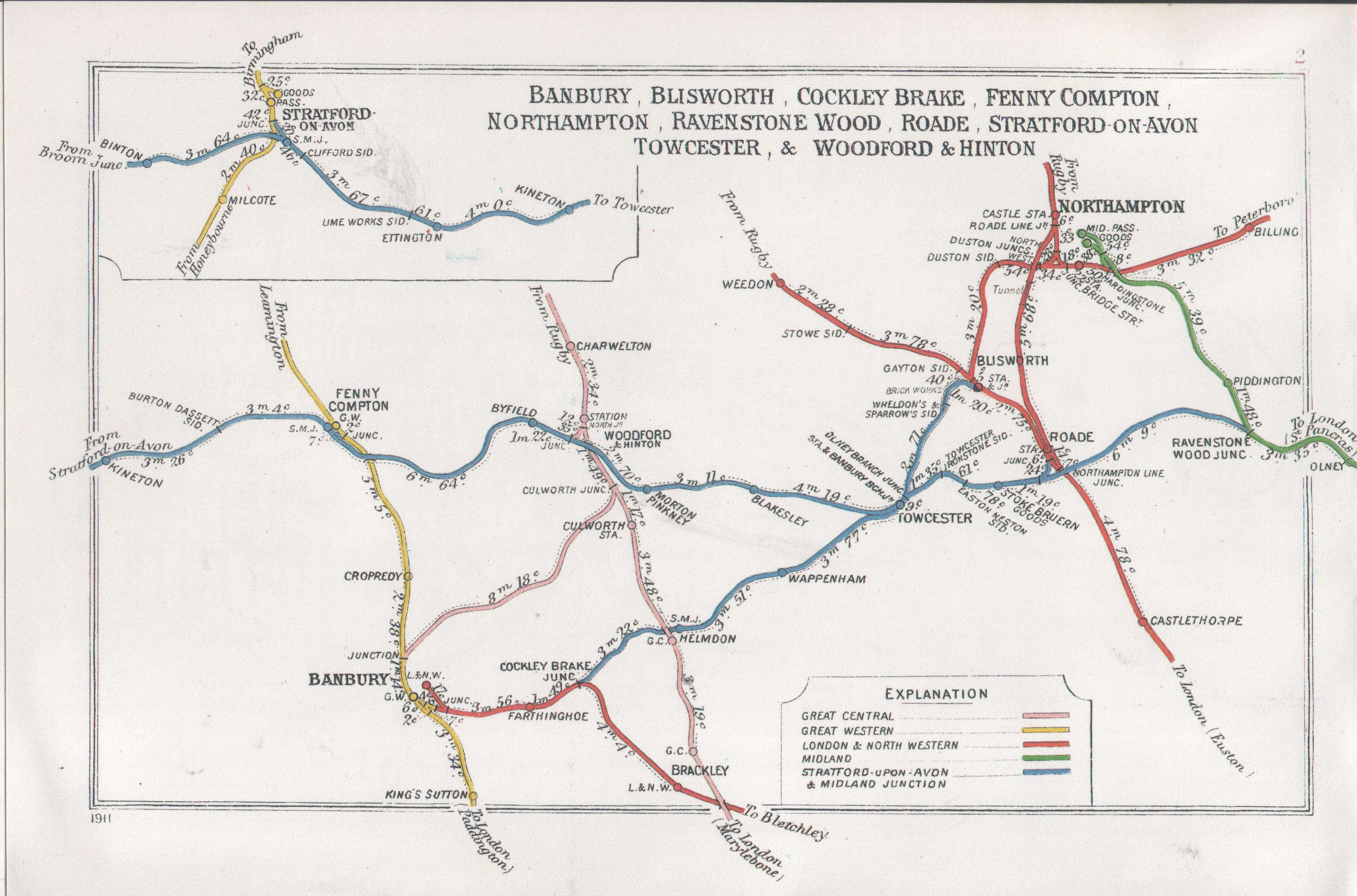
A 1911 Railway Clearing House map of railways in the vicinity of Byfield (left centre, in blue)

Preceding station	Disused railways	Following station
Fenny Compton West	SMJR; East and West Junction Railway	Morton Pinkney
Terminus	SMJR & GCR	Woodford Halse

== See also ==
- Beeching Axe
