= Woodford Halse =

Village in Northamptonshire, England

Coordinates: 52.171°N 1.207°W

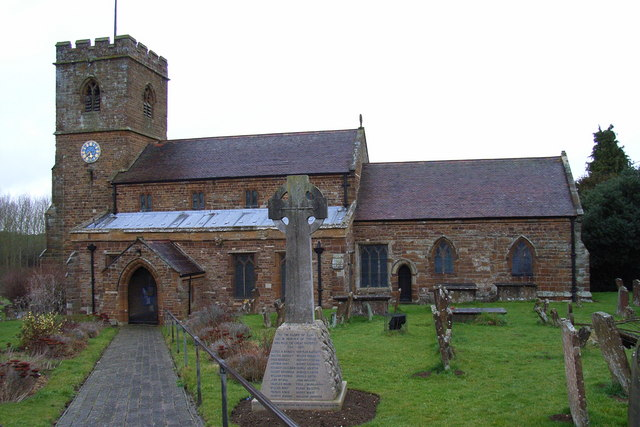
- St Mary the Virgin parish church

- Location within Northamptonshire
- OS grid reference: SP5452
- Civil parish: Woodford cum Membris
- Unitary authority: West Northamptonshire
- Ceremonial county: Northamptonshire
- Region: East Midlands
- Country: England
- Sovereign state: United Kingdom
- Post town: Daventry
- Postcode district: NN11
- Dialling code: 01327
- Police: Northamptonshire
- Fire: Northamptonshire
- Ambulance: East Midlands
- UK Parliament: Daventry
- Website: Woodford cum Membris

Woodford Halse is a village in West Northamptonshire, England, about 6.5 miles (10.5 km) south of Daventry. It is in the civil parish of Woodford cum Membris, which includes also the village of Hinton and the hamlet of West Farndon. Hinton and Woodford Halse are separated by the infant River Cherwell and the former course of the Great Central Main Line railway. The village was formerly served by the Great Central Railway, which provided significant local employment, including Woodford Halse railway station which opened in 1899 and closed in 1966.

== Churches ==
The earliest parts of the Church of England parish church of Saint Mary the Virgin include the chancel, west tower and south doorway, which date from about 1300. The arcade of the south aisle is 14th or 15th century.

St Mary's has a ring of six bells plus a sanctus bell. One of the Watts family of bell-founders, who had foundries in Bedford and Leicester, cast four of the bells including the tenor in 1613. John Taylor & Co of Loughborough cast a fifth in 1909 and the present treble in 1976.

St. Mary's parish is a member of the Benefice of Woodford Halse with Eydon, Byfield, Northamptonshire, Aston Le Walls and Boddington, Northamptonshire.

Woodford Halse has also a Moravian Church.

== Economic history ==
A flight of four lynchets survive south of the village: a rare survival in Northamptonshire. In 1758 the open field system of farming around Woodford Halse was ended by enclosure. The ridge and furrow pattern of the common fields is visible in parts of the parish, and especially just south of the village. Allotments northeast of the village are laid out along the ridges and furrows, and follow their uneven widths and reverse S-curve.

In 1848 Woodford Halse's principal landowners included Sir Henry E.L. Dryden, 7th Baronet and Sir Charles Knightley, 2nd Baronet.

=== Railway ===
In July 1873 the East and West Junction Railway (later part of the Stratford-upon-Avon and Midland Junction Railway) was opened through the parish. The line passed just over 1/2-mile (800 m) south of the village but the nearest station on the line was at Byfield almost 2 miles (3 km) away.

On 15 March 1899 the Great Central Railway (GCR) opened its main line from Nottingham Victoria to London Marylebone through the parish, using the valley of the River Cherwell to pass between Woodford Halse and Hinton. The GCR established a new station called Woodford & Hinton, a four-way railway junction, a major locomotive depot and extensive marshalling yards. A plan to build carriage sheds here was not implemented, but between the old village and the new railway several rows of terraced houses for railway workers were built, together with a street of shops.

The Railway Hotel was built in 1900. By 1973 it had become Woodford Halse Social Club.

The parish's population eventually peaked at just under 2,000, at which time the village had its own cinema. The GCR main line was at times a busy route and the depot and yards at Woodford Halse were very active.

British Railways renamed the station Woodford Halse on 1 November 1948. Following the 1963 The Reshaping of British Railways report, BR closed the station, the main line and the Banbury branch of the former GCR on 5 September 1966. All tracks and most railway buildings were dismantled. The population fell sharply as former railway workers left the parish, but new developments in later decades have since increased it. Where the GCR's line, depot and yards were sited is now a tree plantation which was acquired by the Parish Council in 2016 as a public amenity space and a small modern industrial estate, but evidence of the railway is still visible.

Currently, public transport serving Woodford Halse consists of an hourly bus between Banbury and Daventry, operated by Stagecoach Oxfordshire.

== Amenities ==
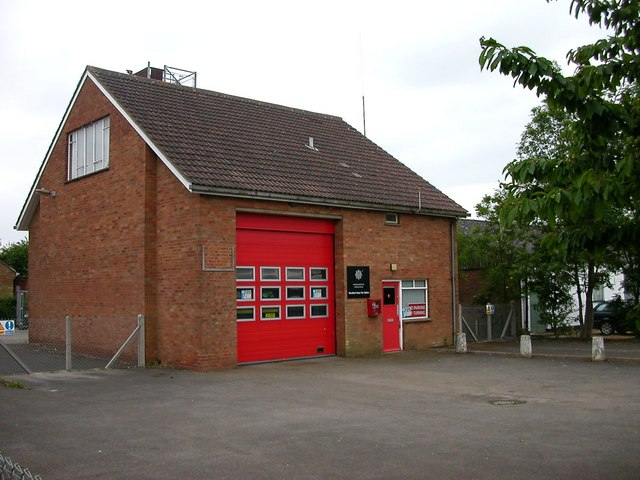
Woodford Halse fire station

Woodford Halse Church of England Primary School serves the parish. The school has one of the largest playing fields of any Northamptonshire school and holds an annual cross-country race, attracting over 700 competitors from more than thirty schools. The village has several shops and businesses. Northamptonshire Fire and Rescue Service has a fire station at Woodford Halse, staffed by retained firefighters. The village's regular social events include the Annual Christmas Street Fair and Summer Boat Races.

== Media ==
Television signals in the village are received from the local relay transmitter which is transmitted via the Sutton Coldfield transmitter. However, signals can also be received from the Sandy Heath and Oxford transmitters.

Local radio stations are BBC Radio Northampton, Heart East, Inspiration FM and Connect Radio.

The local weekly newspaper serving the village is the Daventry Express.

== Sport and leisure ==
Woodford Halse has a non-League football club, Woodford United F.C., which plays at Byfield Road.

== Sources and further reading ==
- Irons, Ruth; Jenkins, Stanley C. (1999). Woodford Halse: A Railway Community. Oakwood Reminiscences. Usk: Oakwood Press. ISBN 0-85361-529-2.
- Lewis, Samuel, ed. (1848). A Topographical Dictionary of England. London: Samuel Lewis & Co. pp. 652–654.
- Pevsner, Nikolaus; Cherry, Bridget (1973) [1961]. Northamptonshire. The Buildings of England. Harmondsworth: Penguin Books. pp. 468–469. ISBN 0-14-071022-1.
- RCHME, ed. (1981). An Inventory of the Historical Monuments in the County of Northamptonshire. Vol. 3, Archaeological Sites in North-West Northamptonshire. London: Her Majesty's Stationery Office. pp. 201–204.
