= Sulgrave =

Village in Northamptonshire, England

Coordinates: 52.103°N 1.184°W

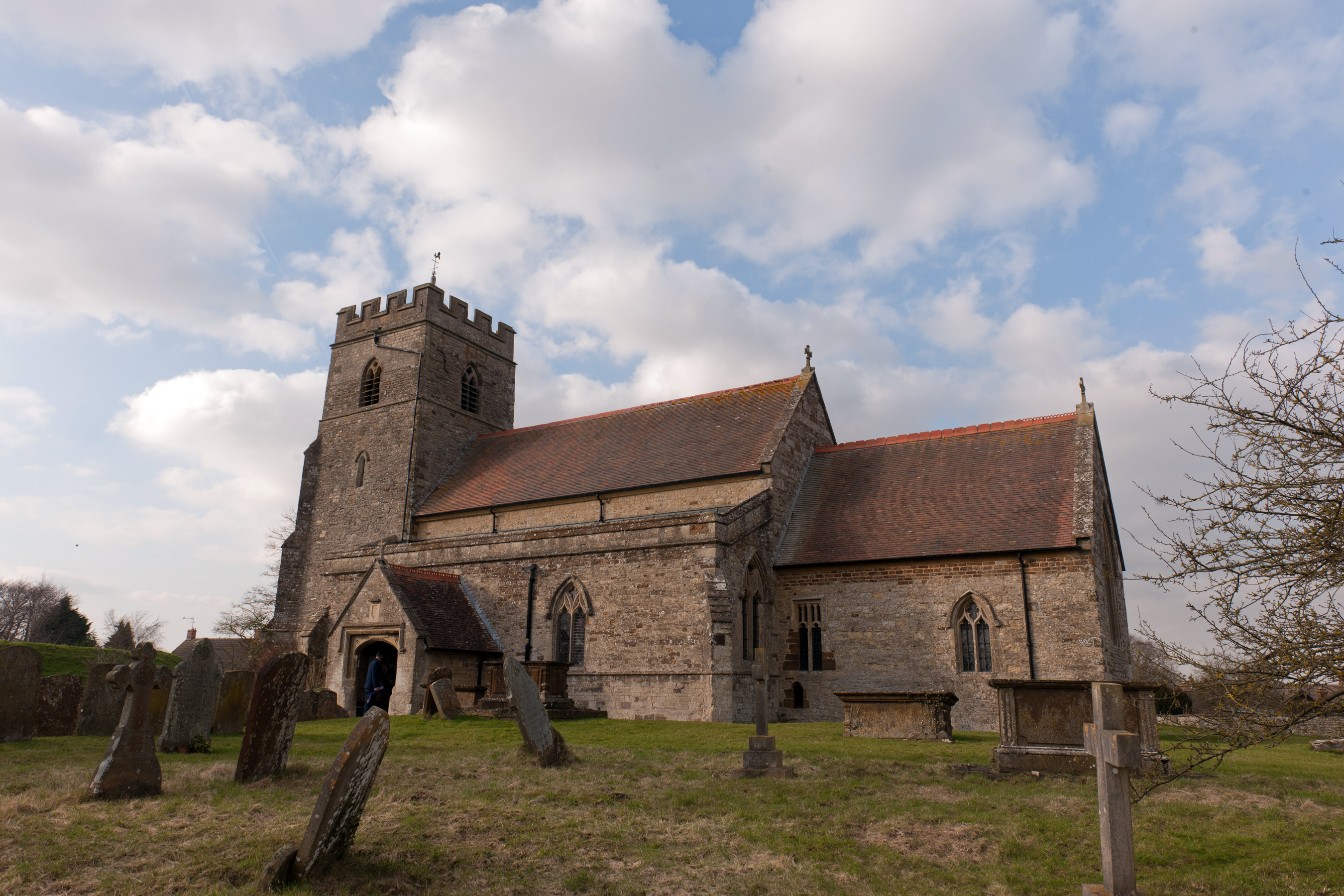
- St James the Less parish church

- Location within Northamptonshire
- Area: 8.3 km^{2} (3.2 sq mi)
- Population: 380 (2011 census)
  - Density: 49.4/km^{2} (128/sq mi)
- OS grid reference: SP557453
  - London: 73 mi (117 km)
- Civil parish: Sulgrave
- Unitary authority: West Northamptonshire
- Ceremonial county: Northamptonshire
- Region: East Midlands
- Country: England
- Sovereign state: United Kingdom
- Post town: Banbury
- Postcode district: OX17
- Dialling code: 01295
- Police: Northamptonshire
- Fire: Northamptonshire
- Ambulance: East Midlands
- UK Parliament: Daventry
- Website: Sulgrave Village Website

Sulgrave is a village and civil parish in West Northamptonshire, England, about 5 miles (8 km) north of Brackley. The village is just south of a stream that rises in the parish and flows east to join the River Tove, a tributary of the Great Ouse.

The village's name means 'grove in a gully' or perhaps, 'pit/trench in a gully'. Alternatively, the specific may be a personal name, 'Sula'.

== Prehistory ==
Just over 1 mile (1.6 km) north of the village is Barrow Hill, a bowl barrow beside Banbury Lane between Culworth and Weston. The barrow is oval, about 130 feet (40 m) long, 80 feet (24 m) wide and up to 6 1/2 feet (2 m) high. It is Bronze Age and may date from between 2400 and 1500 BC. It may have been surrounded by a ditch, but this can no longer be traced. The mound may have been re-used in the Middle Ages as the base for a windmill. The barrow is largely intact, although it has been partly disturbed by badgers. It is a scheduled monument.

== Castle ==
Castle Hill, at the west end of the village southwest of the church, is the earthwork remains of a Saxon and Norman ringwork castle. The northern part of the ringwork was excavated in 1960 and 1976.

Evidence was found suggesting that the first construction on the site was a timber-framed hall about 80 feet (24 m) long and a detached stone and timber building, probably built in the late 10th century. They seem to have been an Anglo-Saxon manor house and separate kitchen. This was followed by the building of the earthen rampart, which is now rounded but may originally have been a straight-sided pentagon.

After the Norman Conquest of England in 1066 the original hall was replaced with a stone one about 40 feet (12 m) long and 18 feet (5.5 m) wide. Small timber buildings were also added. The earthen ramparts were increased in height in the middle of the 11th century, and again early in the 12th century. The site seems to have been abandoned about 1140. It is a scheduled monument.

East-south-east of Sulgrave is Gallow Field, within Stuchbury, the site of the Anglo-Saxon moots for the Domesday-era hundred of Alboldstow. Sulgrave was within the adjoining hundred of Warden.

After the Norman Conquest Sulgrave was one of the manors granted to Ghilo or Gilo, brother of Ansculf de Picquigny. The Domesday Book of 1086 records that three tenants; Hugh, Landric and Othbert; held Sulgrave of him. In the 12th century the manor of "Solegrave" was still in the fee of Gilo. On both occasions the manor was assessed at four hides. In the middle of the 12th century the manor was granted to the Cluniac Priory of St Andrew at Northampton, and the ringwork site was abandoned as a manorial seat.

== Sulgrave Manor ==
In, 1538 St Andrew's Priory was suppressed in the dissolution of the monasteries and surrendered all its estates to the Crown.

=== The Washington family ===
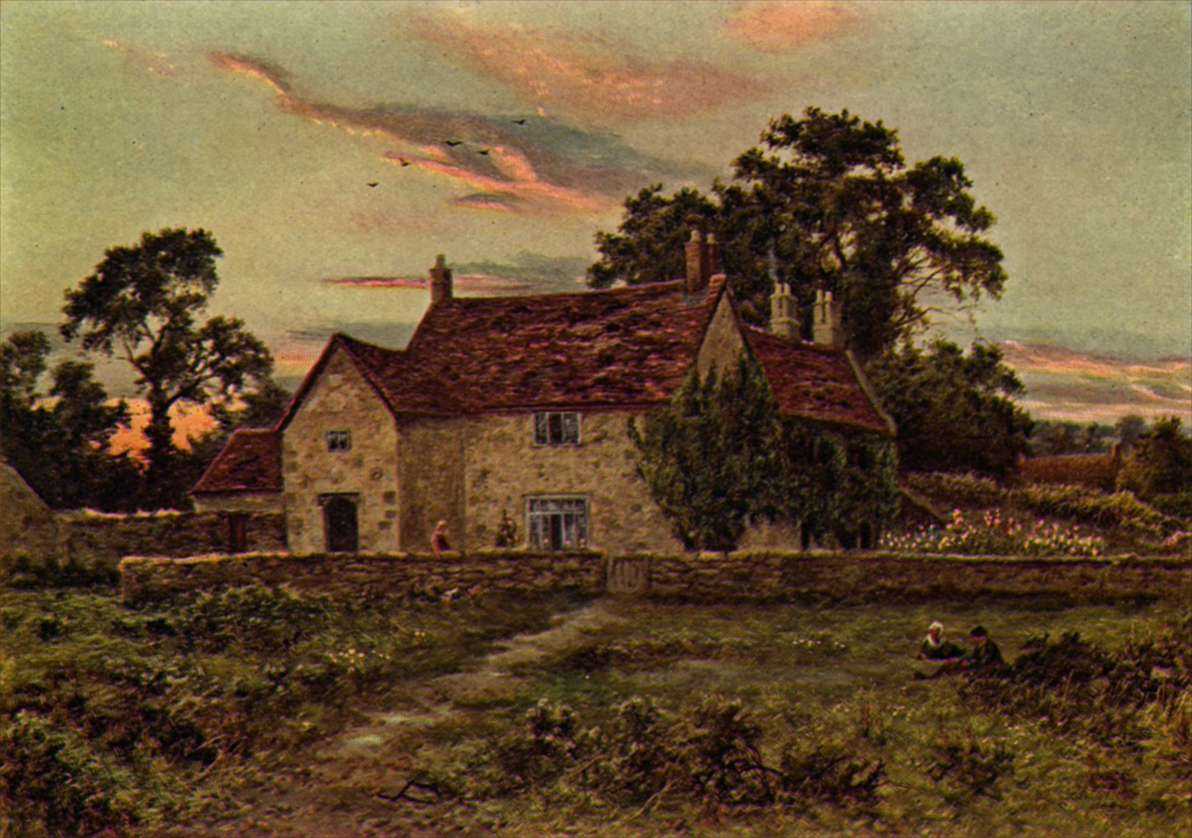
Sulgrave Manor in 1910, before the west wing was reinstated

In 1539 or 1540 the Crown sold three manors, including Sulgrave, to Lawrence Washington, a wool merchant who in 1532 had been Mayor of Northampton. Washington's descendants retained the manor until 1659, when one of them sold it. In 1656 a descendant, John Washington of Purleigh, Essex, emigrated to the Colony of Virginia. He is notable for being the great-grandfather of George Washington, who from 1775 commanded the Continental Army in the American Revolutionary War and in 1789 was elected first President of the United States.

Lawrence Washington had Sulgrave Manor house built in about 1540–60. It is at the northeast end of the village, built of local limestone, with a southwest front, a kitchen and buttery, a great hall, and above it a great chamber and two smaller private chambers. The great hall has a stone floor, and its Tudor fireplace contains a salt cupboard carved with Lawrence Washington's initials.

The house has a projecting two-storey southwest porch, over the doorway of which are set in plaster the royal arms of England and initials "ER" for Elizabeth Regina commemorating Elizabeth I, who acceded to the English throne in 1558. The doorway spandrels are decorated with the Washington family arms: two bars and three mullets or spur-rowels.

=== The Hodges family ===
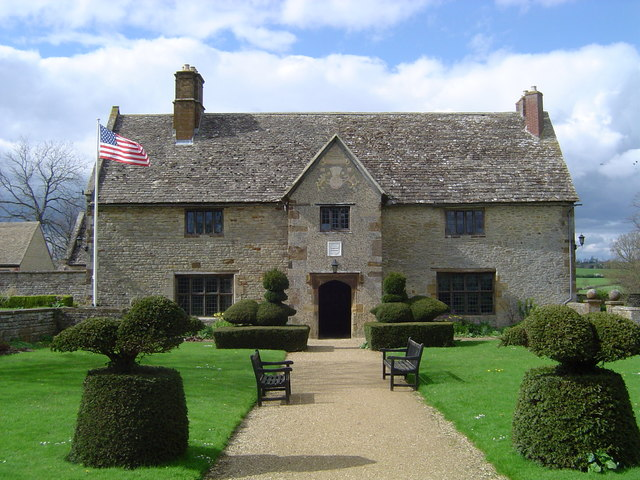
Sulgrave Manor as restored. The west wing (left) is a replica built in the 1920s.

In about 1673 Sulgrave Manor passed to the Rev Moses Hodges, from whom it passed to his son John Hodges. The lands of Sulgrave manor had become divided into three estates, but John Hodges reunited them. Behind the great hall is a staircase with twisted balusters that was added late in the 17th century. In about 1700 John Hodges had the house rebuilt and enlarged by adding a north-east wing at right angles to the original Tudor building. Hodges also had a separate brewhouse built at the same time. The Hodges family had the west part of the original house demolished in about 1780. The Hodges sold the house in 1840, by which time it was a dilapidated farmhouse.

=== Restoration and museum ===
In 1914 the house was bought by public subscription to celebrate a century of peace between the UK and USA since the War of 1812. Under the direction of the architect Sir Reginald Blomfield the house was restored in 1920–30 and a new west wing was added in 1921 in symmetry with the surviving east wing. The house is open to the public and is administered by the Sulgrave Manor Trust (formerly Sulgrave Manor Board). It is a Grade I listed building.

== Church and chapels ==
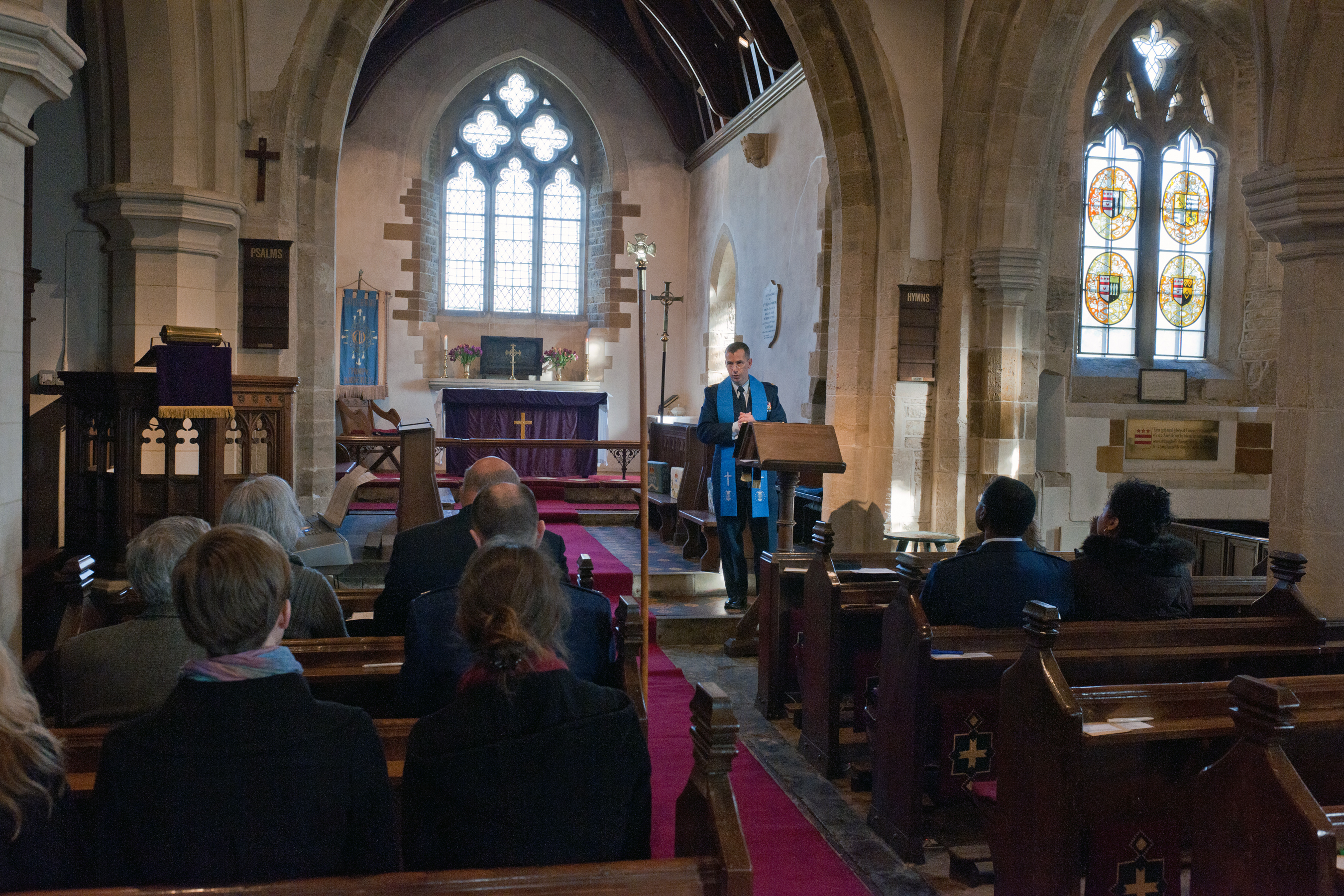
Inside the nave of St James the Less parish church, looking east towards the chancel

=== Church of England ===
The Church of England parish church of St James the Less was built in the 13th and 14th centuries. The Cluniac St Andrew's Priory, Northampton held the advowson from the 13th century until 1538, when the priory was suppressed. St James' church is a Grade II* listed building. It is part of the benefice of Culworth, with Sulgrave and Thorpe Mandeville, and Chipping Warden, with Edgcote and Moreton Pinkney.

=== Baptist and Methodist ===
In the 19th century a Baptist chapel was built in Little Street and a Methodist one was built in Manor Road. They were used for worship until about 1970. The Methodist chapel has been converted into a house; the Baptist one was demolished in 1976 and replaced with a house.

== Economic and social history ==
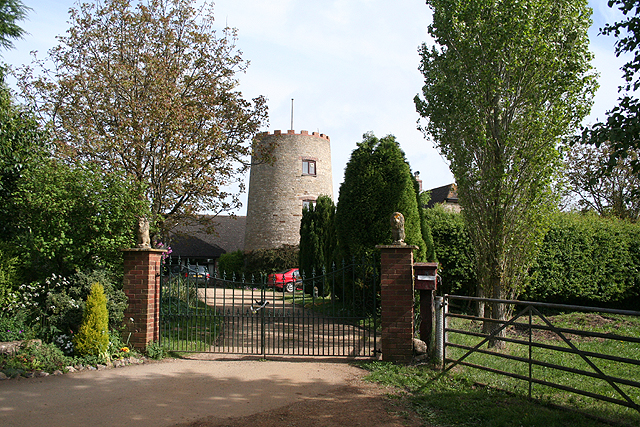
Former tower mill, now a private house

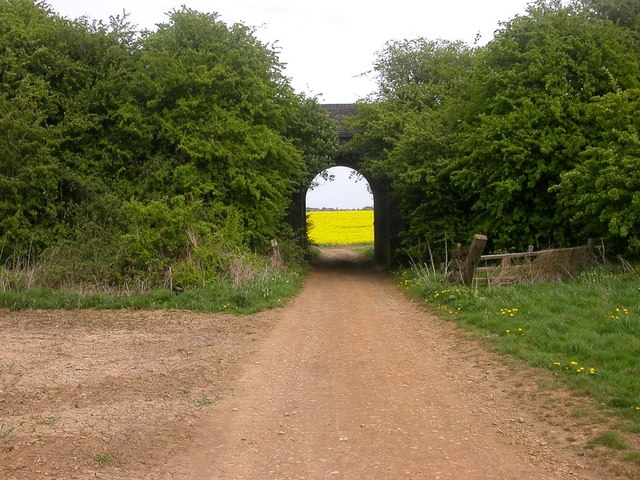
A bridge east of the village where a farm road passes under the former route of the Great Central Main Line

The village has an unusual layout, with two streets (Magpie Road/Manor Road and Little Street) running parallel roughly and joined in a figure of eight. In three places there are traces of former medieval or post-medieval buildings. At the southwest corner of the village, south of the church, are traces of what may have been houses but are more likely to have been part of the manor complex based around the ringwork. Behind houses on the northwest side of the village are low banks and shallow ditches that suggest closes larger than the current gardens. In the northeast part of the village, on the south side of Manor Road, are traces of house platforms and earth banks that surrounded their closes.

About 1/2-mile (800 m) southeast of the village is a pillow mound about 40 feet (12 m) long, 23 feet (7 m) wide and only 10 inches (0.25 m) high, and bounded by a ditch 6 1/2 feet (2 m) wide. It is the remains of an artificial warren for farming rabbits, which the Normans introduced to Britain from mainland Europe.

Sulgrave Inclosure Act 1759
- Act of Parliament
- Parliament of Great Britain
- Long title: An Act for dividing and enclosing the Open and Common Fields, Common Meadows, Common Grounds, and Commonable Lands, within the Parish, Township, and Liberties, of Sulgrave, in the County of Northampton.
- Citation: 33 Geo. 2. c. 5 Pr.
- Territorial extent: Great Britain

Dates
- Royal assent: 24 March 1760
- Commencement: 13 November 1759 (Note: Start of session.)

Status: Current legislation

Traces of traditional ridge and furrow ploughing survive in much of the parish, and particularly south-east of the village. They are evidence of the open field system of farming that prevailed in the parish until Parliament passed the Sulgrave Inclosure Act 1759 (33 Geo. 2. c. 5 Pr.).

John and Mary Hodges founded Sulgrave school in the early 18th century as a charity school for poor boys of the parish. The school building, at the corner of Magpie Road and Stockwell Lane, is a stone building which according to its date stone was completed in 1720. It was probably remodelled in the 19th century. It is now the village hall.

A water mill on the stream just north of the village was built in the 18th century and enlarged in the 19th century. In 1788 the miller was a John Brockliss, who ordered machinery from Boulton and Watt. The mill is now a private house but is said to retain an iron mill-wheel made in about 1840. The mill-pond survives.

There was a tower mill about 600 yards (550 m) northwest of the village. By the 1970s it was derelict but the tower has since been restored as part of a private house.

The parish stocks survive. They are on The Green, at the junction of Magpie Road and Park Lane, and are probably 19th century.

=== Railways ===
In 1872 the Northampton and Banbury Junction Railway was opened between Blisworth and Farthinghoe. It passed roughly east–west through Greatworth parish about 1 1/4 miles (2 km) south of Sulgrave, and its nearest station was at Helmdon about 2 1/4 miles (4 km) away. In 1910 it became part of the Stratford-upon-Avon and Midland Junction Railway (SMJR).

In the 1899 the Great Central Main Line to London Marylebone was built through the east of Sulgrave parish, passing about 3/5-mile (1 km) east of the manor house. The Great Central Railway opened its own Helmdon station, causing confusion with the SMJR's existing Helmdon station. The London and North Eastern Railway succeeded the GC in 1923 and renamed the main line station "Helmdon for Sulgrave" in 1928.

British Railways closed the SMJR station and line in 1951, the GC main line station 1963 and the GC main line in 1966.

== Amenities ==
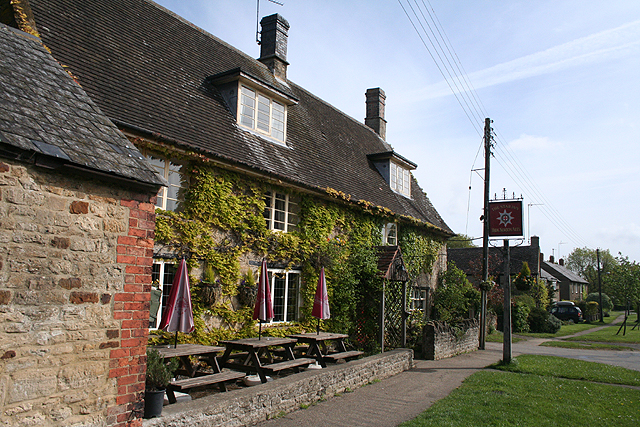
The Star Inn

The Star Inn was built in the 18th century and is now a public house.

Sulgrave Village Shop Association Limited (SVS) is an industrial and provident society, owned by the residents of Sulgrave, to run a shop and post office. Under its constitution, profits are not for distribution to its members but must be reinvested in the enterprise to continue and develop its services to the community.
