= Edgcote =

Village in Northamptonshire, England

Coordinates: 52.126°N 1.265°W

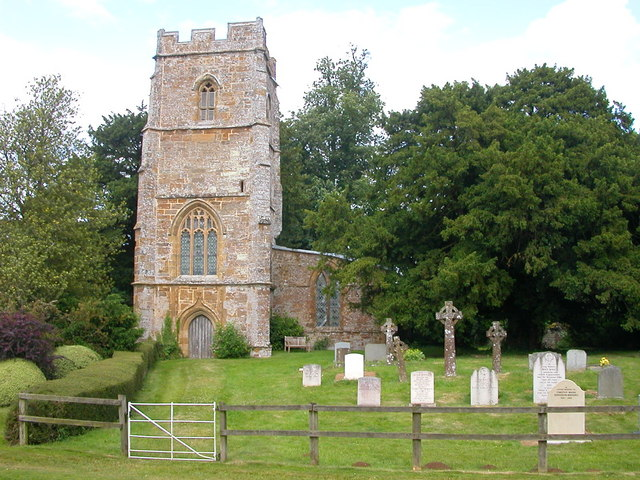
- St. James Church

- Location within Northamptonshire
- Population: 57 (2001 census)
- OS grid reference: SP5047
  - London: 67 miles (108 km)
- Civil parish: Chipping Warden and Edgcote
- Unitary authority: West Northamptonshire
- Ceremonial county: Northamptonshire
- Region: East Midlands
- Country: England
- Sovereign state: United Kingdom
- Post town: Banbury
- Postcode district: OX17
- Police: Northamptonshire
- Fire: Northamptonshire
- Ambulance: East Midlands
- UK Parliament: South Northamptonshire

Edgcote is a village and former civil parish, now in the parish of Chipping Warden and Edgcote, in the West Northamptonshire district, in the ceremonial county of Northamptonshire, England. It is situated on the River Cherwell. The parish was bounded by the river to the north and by one of its tributaries to the east. The village is about 5.5 miles (9 km) north-east of Banbury in neighbouring Oxfordshire, and the south-western boundary of the parish formed part of the county boundary. In 2001 the parish had a population of 57.

== History ==
The village's name possibly means, "cottage(s) of the Hwicce", a tribal name. On 1 October 2008 the parish was abolished and merged with Chipping Warden to form "Chipping Warden & Edgcote".

== Edgcote House ==
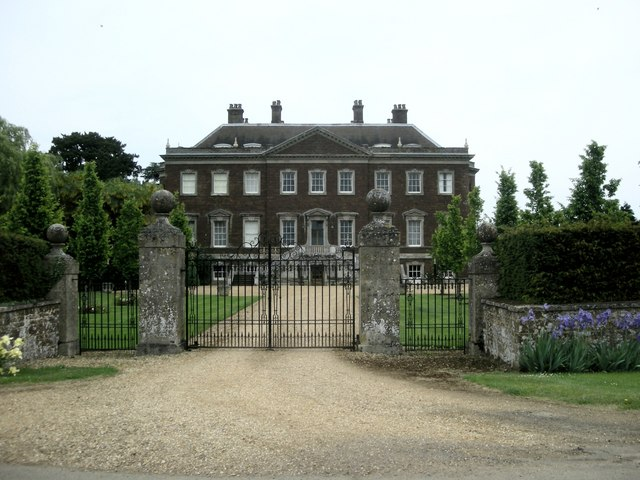
Edgcote (also spelt as Edgecote) Hall

Edgcote House (or Hall) is an 18th-century, 25,900 sq ft (2,410 m^{2}) country house of two storeys plus a basement and a nine bay frontage. The manor house is built of local ironstone with dressings of fine grey stone. Features include a carved mahogany staircase, and a drawing room decorated in a Chinese style. It is a Grade I listed building.

In 1543 the Edgcote estate, which had previously belonged to Anne of Cleves, was bought from the Crown by William Chauncy, MP for Northamptonshire and High Sheriff of Northamptonshire for 1579.

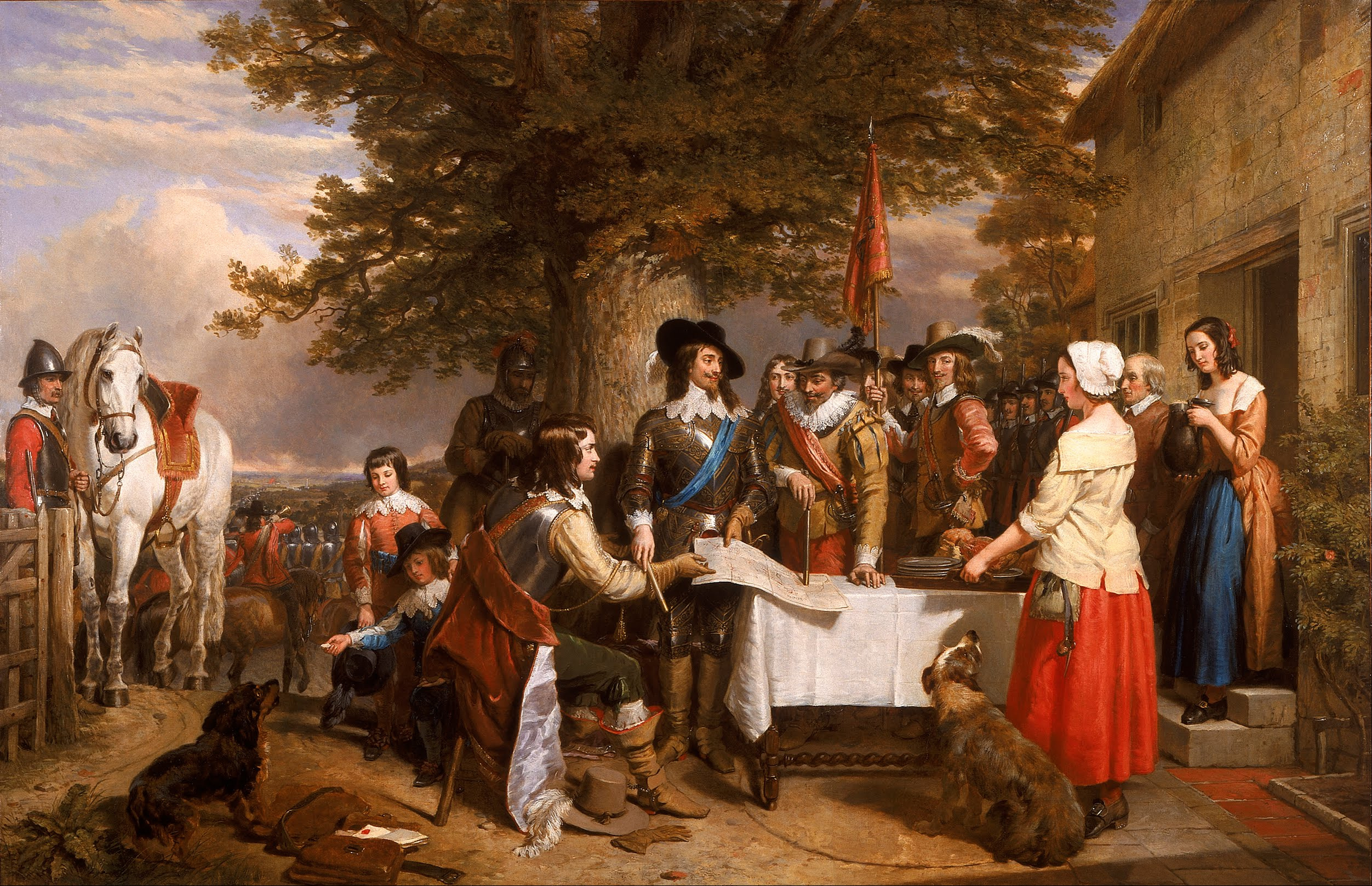
The Eve of the Battle of Edgehill by Charles Landseer, 1845. Charles I (in blue sash) holding a council of war at Edgecote on the day before the Battle of Edgehill. Rupert, seated, commanded the King's cavalry.

In the October 1642 Charles I abandoned Shrewsbury as his temporary headquarters after the battle of Wem, and made for Oxford/London.

On the journey, Edgcote House was used as headquarters by the army of before the Battle of Edgehill on 23 October, the first major battle of the English Civil War.

The poet Mary Leapor worked at Edgcote House at a point in her life, and the poem "Crumble-Hall" was inspired by her time working there.

By 1742 the house had descended to Richard Chauncy, a London merchant, who commissioned the architect William Jones to build the present house in 1747–52 to replace a previous building. He employed the carpenter Abraham Swan, and the plasterer John Whitehead. Initially the stables were surveyed by William Smith of Warwick (1705–1747), and rebuilt 1745–7. The London blacksmith Thomas Stephens (d. 1771) made a cast-iron balustrade, and the house was furnished in the later 1750s by Vile & Cobb (William Vile and John Cobb).

His son William Henry Chauncy caused the village of Edgcote to be resited to improve his view sometime before 1788. The estate then passed to his unmarried sister Anna Maria Chauncy and from her to Thomas Carter, Richard Chauncy’s great-nephew, and from him to a distant cousin, Julia Frances Aubrey, who was married to William Cartwright. They moved in during 1847 and the Cartwrights remained in possession until 1926, when they were obliged to sell it to the Courage family. In 2005 it bought by businessman David Allen.

The 1,700-acre (690 ha) park was laid out in the 18th century and features a lake fed by the River Cherwell and the remains of a Roman villa. The house is heated by heat energy extracted from the lake.

BBC Television used the house in its 1995 television adaptation of Jane Austen's Pride and Prejudice to depict Netherfield House. The estate may be adversely affected by the proposed HS2 high speed railway line.

== Parish church ==
The oldest parts of the Church of England parish church of St. James are the 13th century south doorway and three-bay south arcade. Inside the church is a series of monuments to the Chauncey family. The oldest are to Toby Chauncey (died 1579) and William Chauncey (died 1585). They are followed by four monuments to 17th and 18th century members of the family carved by the Flemish sculptor John Michael Rysbrack.

St. James' has a ring of four bells plus a sanctus bell. The sanctus bell was cast in about 1500 by an unidentified bell-founder. Bartholomew Atton of Buckingham cast the oldest bell in the ring in 1592. His successor Robert Atton cast the tenor bell in 1623. Henry I Bagley of Chacombe cast the third bell in 1660 and the treble bell in 1668. The ring is currently unringable.

St. James' parish is a member of the Benefice of Culworth with Sulgrave and Thorpe Mandeville and Chipping Warden with Edgcote and Moreton Pinkney.

The Vicarage south of the church is a Georgian house of five bays.

== Sources ==
- Pevsner, Nikolaus; Cherry, Bridget (1973) [1961]. Northamptonshire. The Buildings of England. Harmondsworth: Penguin Books. pp. 208–209. ISBN 0-14-071022-1.
