= Culworth railway station =

Former GCML Railway Station in Northamptonshire

Coordinates: 52.1304°N 1.1774°W

Culworth
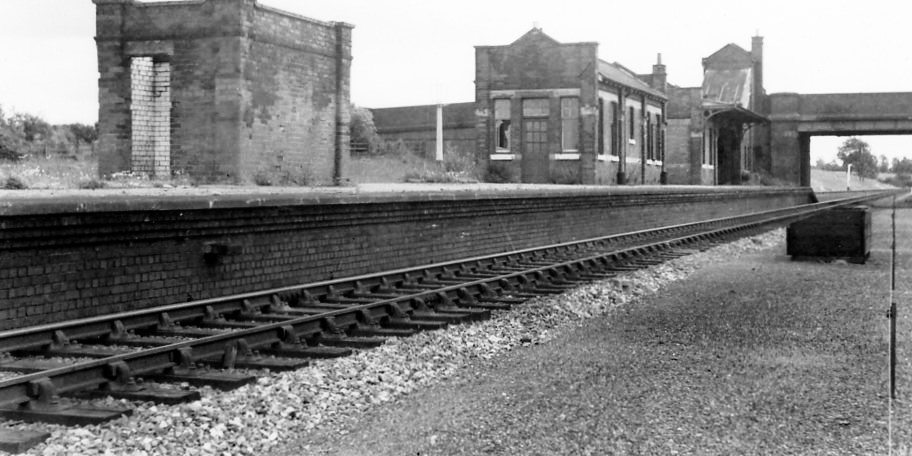

General information
- Location: Moreton Pinkney, West Northamptonshire; England
- Grid reference: SP564483
- Platforms: 2

Other information
- Status: Disused

History
- Original company: Great Central Railway
- Pre-grouping: Great Central Railway
- Post-grouping: London and North Eastern Railway, BR(ER), finally, BR(LMR)

Key dates
- 15 March 1899: Opened
- 29 September 1958: Closed to passengers
- 4 June 1962: Closed to all traffic
Location

This station, near the village of Moreton Pinkney in Northamptonshire, was on the former Great Central Railway's London Extension which ran from the north of England to London and opened in March 1899.

== History ==
Located midway between the stations at Woodford & Hinton and Helmdon near the village of Moreton Pinkney, this name could not be used because there was already a station with this name by the village served by the Stratford-upon-Avon and Midland Junction Railway, built 26 years earlier, in 1873. Instead, the name of the next nearest significant village was chosen, "Culworth".

A year after opening, a branch was built between nearby Woodford Halse and Banbury and in 1913, a small station was added on the western edge of Culworth, which had to be named "Eydon Road Halt".

== Services ==
The two stations near Culworth and the surrounding villages and hamlets lay on different lines and served different purposes. And it has to be said, that with such obliquely given names, there were mix-ups. Culworth station only catered for the smaller stations on the north–south axis, including the neighbouring town of Brackley: for more distant destinations, a change had to be made at Woodford & Hinton or Brackley. Eydon Road Halt station on the Banbury Branch was used to reach the larger town of Banbury or the village of Woodford Halse – at either of which a connection could be made with trains running further afield.

Operationally, the traffic at Culworth was of the rural kind and relatively light. For passengers, only the ordinary passenger trains called; expresses passed through non-stop. The goods traffic was handled by pick-up trains between Woodford & Hinton and Quainton Road or Marylebone. As both traffics declined, Culworth became one of the first stations on the GC Extension to be closed to passenger traffic, on 24 September 1958, and finally to all traffic on 6 June 1962, after which the site reverted to agricultural use.

== Routes ==
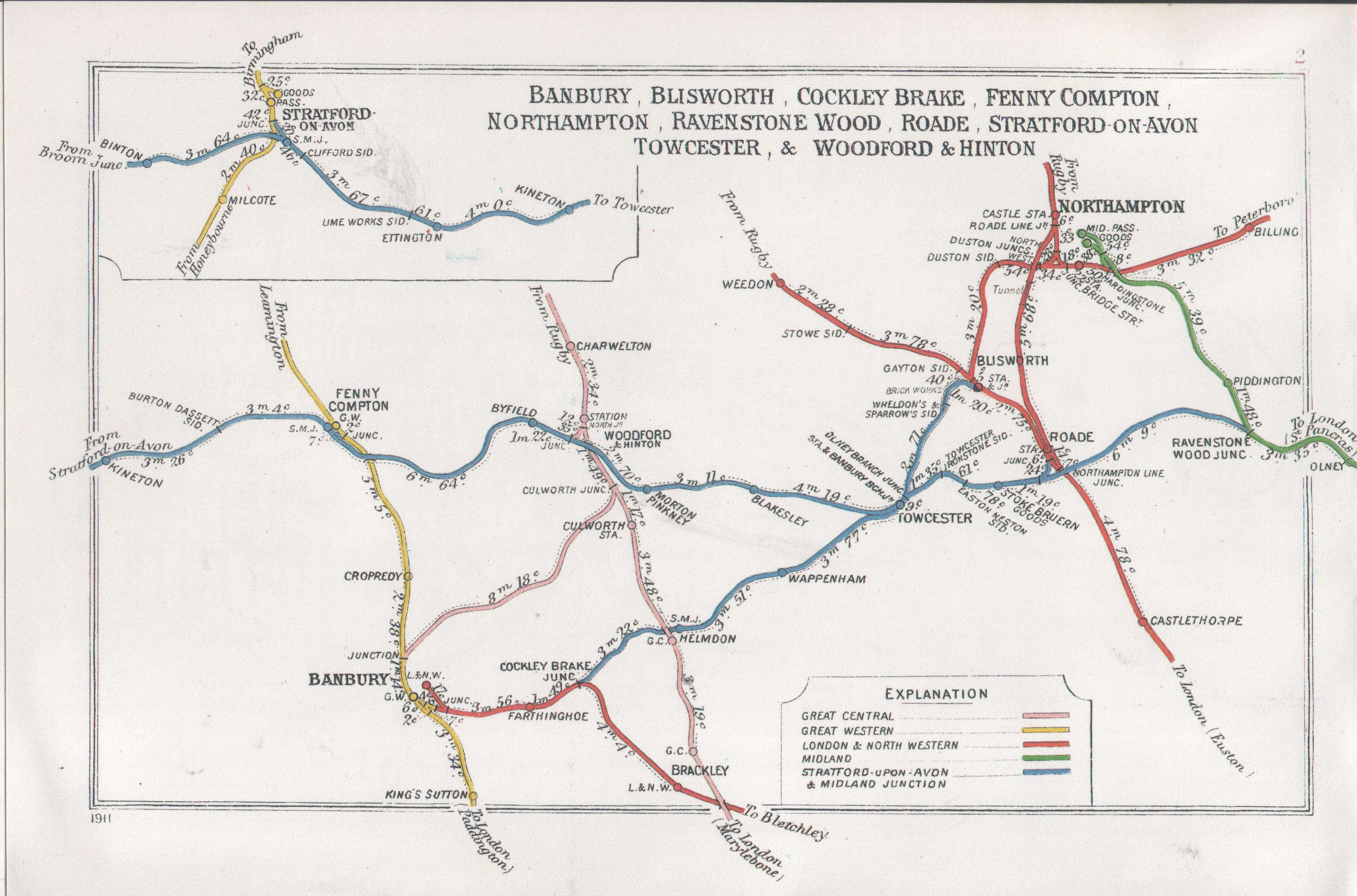
A 1911 Railway Clearing House map of railways in the vicinity of Culworth (centre, in pink)

Preceding station	Disused railways	Following station
Helmdon; Line and station closed	Great Central Railway; London Extension	Woodford Halse; Line and station closed
