= Moreton Pinkney =

Village in Northamptonshire, England

Coordinates: 52.138°N 1.163°W

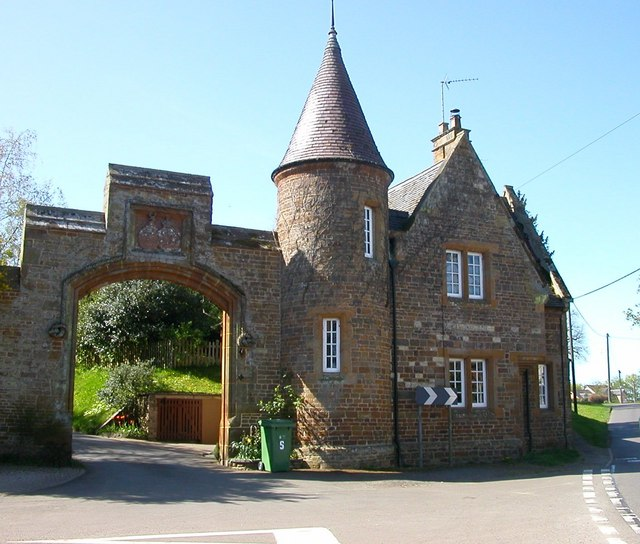
- Lodge and gateway to the manor house

- Location within Northamptonshire
- Population: 371 (2011 census)
- OS grid reference: SP5749
- Civil parish: Moreton Pinkney
- Unitary authority: West Northamptonshire
- Ceremonial county: Northamptonshire
- Region: East Midlands
- Country: England
- Sovereign state: United Kingdom
- Post town: Daventry
- Postcode district: NN11
- Dialling code: 01295
- Police: Northamptonshire
- Fire: Northamptonshire
- Ambulance: East Midlands
- UK Parliament: Daventry
- Website: Moreton Pinkney

Moreton Pinkney is a village and civil parish in West Northamptonshire, about 7.5 miles (12 km) north of Brackley. The 2011 census recorded the parish's population as 371.

The villages name means 'Moor farm/settlement'. It was held by the family of Pinchengi from 1199. In the 13th century, it was known as Geldenmortone, from Old English 'gylden' meaning, 'golden', probably because of its especial wealth.

== Manor ==
In the reign of Edward the Confessor one Leuric held the manor of Moreton "freely", i.e. without a feudal overlord. He was dispossessed after the Norman Conquest of England and the Domesday Book of 1086 records that one Geoffrey held the manor of Gilo, brother of Ansculf de Picquigny. In the 12th century Henry de Pinkeny (sic) held the manor. In both surveys the manor was assessed at one and a half hides.

== Parish church ==
The earliest evidence of Christianity in the parish is a fragment of an Anglo-Saxon stone cross in the churchyard of the Church of England parish church of St Mary the Virgin. The church itself was built in the 12th century, which is the date of its Norman north door and three-bay northern arcade. The piscina and west tower date from about 1300. St Mary's is a Grade II* listed building.

The Augustinian Canons Ashby Priory had appropriated "the spirituality" of St Mary's by 1254. John Dalderby, Bishop of Lincoln, sanctioned this retrospectively in 1309.

The chancel was rebuilt in 1846 in a Gothic Revival of a 13th-century style.

St Mary's has a ring of six bells. Hugh II Watts, who had foundries in Bedford and Leicester, cast the tenor bell in 1629. The Whitechapel Bell Foundry cast the other five bells in 1996.

St Mary's parish is a member of the Benefice of Culworth with Sulgrave and Thorpe Mandeville and Chipping Warden with Edgcote and Moreton Pinkney.

== Social and economic history ==
Moreton Pinkney village is a mixture of traditional houses in grey stone and brown ironstone.

The parish school was built in 1822 and enlarged in 1876. Moreton Pinkney Manor was built in 1859 and altered in 1870. The entrance arch designed by the architect E.F. Law of Northampton, built in 1859 and bears the arms of Lord Sempill. Please note: Historic England Listing, place the Manor earlier than 1859. It notes that irregular gable ends at rear of building existing C17 yet remodelled in 19C.

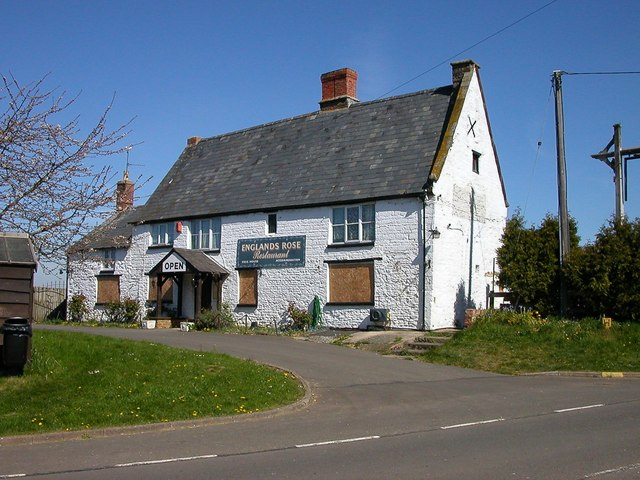
England's Rose pub (formerly The Red Lion) after it closed down

=== Public Houses ===
Moreton Pinkney once had three public houses: The Red Lion and The Dun Cow on Upper Green, and The Crown Inn on Brook Street.

The Red Lion was more recently named England's Rose, a reference to Diana, Princess of Wales, which suddenly closed in 2004 due to serious structural failure. After being closed and remaining derelict for 12 years, the historic Grade II listed public house dating back to 1604 was fully and sympathetically restored as a pub and restaurant which was subsequently renamed The Four Candles by public vote.

The Four Candles which is set within a protected conservation area is now the only pub left in the village and re-opened to the public on 26 May 2016 after a 10 month renovation.

The Four Candles was repossessed from the leaseholders by administrators after the freeholder declared bankruptcy in the summer of 2017. The pub and restaurant freehold was subsequently purchased in February 2019 and is currently under minor renovation and retrofit before being re-opened to an as-yet, undisclosed date.

=== Railways ===
The parish had two railway stations. The East and West Junction Railway (later the Stratford-upon-Avon and Midland Junction Railway) was built through the parish with Morton Pinkney railway station being opened in 1873 1/4-mile (0.4 km) north of the village on the parish boundary with Canons Ashby.

The Great Central Main Line from Nottingham Victoria to London Marylebone was built through the parish in the 1890s and opened in 1899. Its nearest station was Culworth, which was actually in Moreton Pinkney parish about 3/4-mile (1.2 km) southwest of the village on the road to Culworth. In 1900 the Great Central Railway added a branch line from Culworth Junction in the parish to Banbury in Oxfordshire.

British Railways closed Morton Pinkney station in 1952 and Culworth station in 1958. The 1963 The Reshaping of British Railways report recommended that BR close the Great Central main line, which it did in 1966.

== Sources and further reading ==
- Adkins, W.R.D.; Serjeantson, R.M., eds. (1902). A History of the County of Northampton. Victoria County History. Vol. 1. Westminster: Archibald Constable & Co.
- Murphy, Roy (26 November 2016). "Our History, The Four Candles". The Four Candles, Moreton Pinkney. Theoretix Ltd. Archived from the original on 21 December 2016.
- Pevsner, Nikolaus; Cherry, Bridget (1973) [1961]. Northamptonshire. The Buildings of England. Harmondsworth: Penguin Books. p. 307. ISBN 0-14-071022-1.
- RCHME, ed. (1982). "Moreton Pinkney". An Inventory of the Historical Monuments in the County of Northamptonshire. Vol. 4 – Archaeological sites in South-West Northamptonshire. London: Royal Commission on the Historical Monuments of England. pp. 102–103.
- Serjeantson, R.M.; Adkins, W.R.D., eds. (1906). "The Priory of Canons Ashby". A History of the County of Northampton. Victoria County History. Vol. 2. Westminster: Archibald Constable & Co. pp. 130–133.
