= Kineton railway station =

Former railway station in Warwickshire, England

Coordinates: 52.1575°N 1.5181°W

Kineton
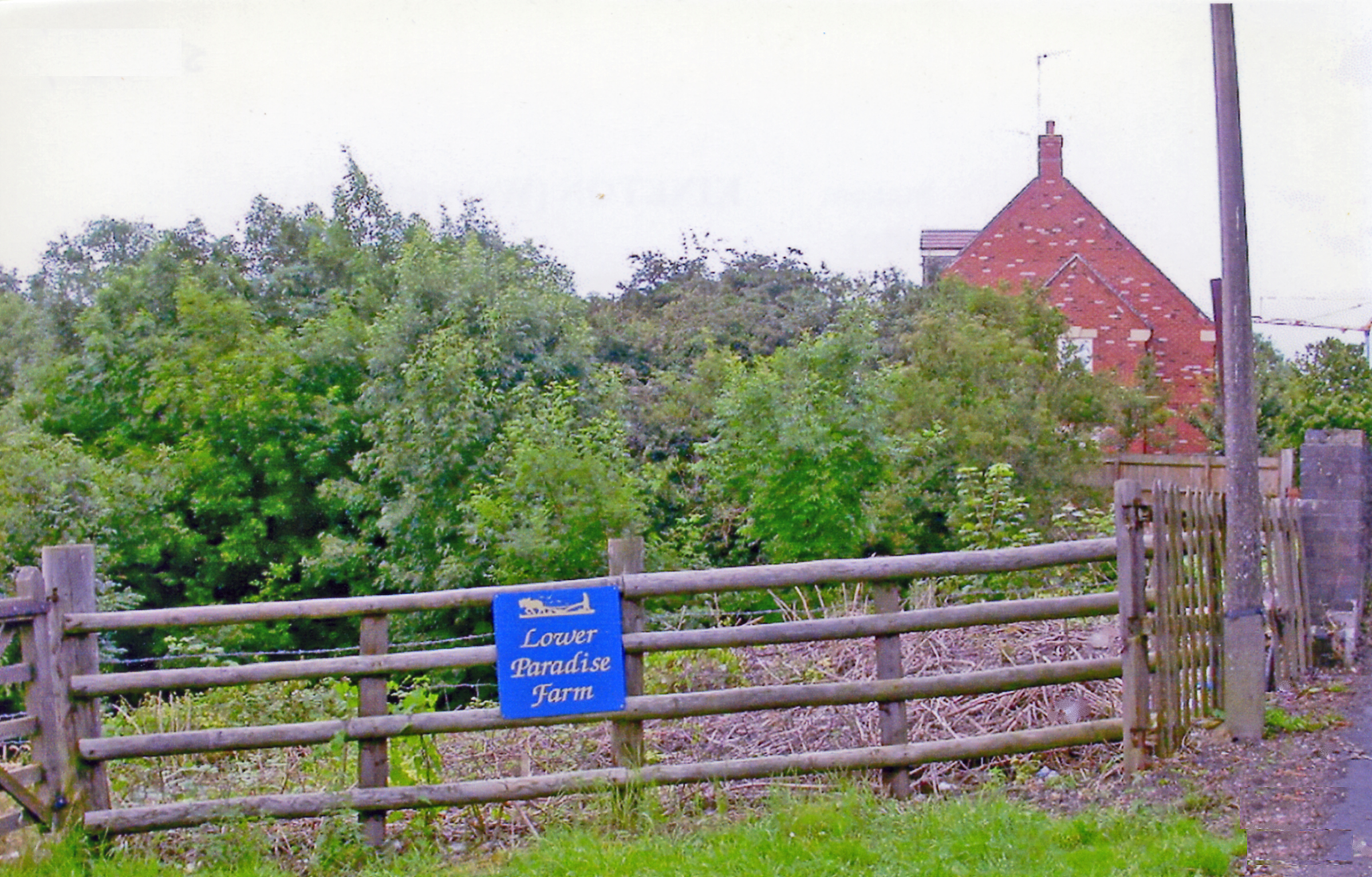
- The site of the station in 2007

General information
- Location: Kineton, Stratford-on-Avon; England
- Platforms: 2

Other information
- Status: Disused

History
- Original company: East and West Junction Railway
- Pre-grouping: Stratford-upon-Avon and Midland Junction Railway
- Post-grouping: London, Midland and Scottish Railway; Western Region of British Railways

Key dates
- 1 June 1871: Station opens
- 1 August 1877: closed
- 22 February 1885: reopened
- 7 April 1952: Station closes
Location

Kineton railway station was a railway station that served the village of Kineton, Warwickshire, England.

== History ==
Opened on 1 June 1871, the station was situated on the East and West Junction Railway's route from Stratford-upon-Avon to Fenny Compton. Until July 1873, it was the headquarters and western terminus of the line. When the connection to Stratford was completed, the latter became the headquarters.

Business did not meet expectations and, in 1877, the station closed. In attempt to improve matters, an extension to Broom Junction was incorporated in 1873 by means of a railway called the "Evesham Redditch and Stratford-upon-Avon Junction Railway" which opened in 1879. As trade picked up, the station was reopened on 22 February 1885. The line became part of the Stratford-upon-Avon and Midland Junction Railway in a merger of 1908 and at grouping in 1923, it became part of the London Midland and Scottish Railway. At nationalisation it became part of the Western Region of British Railways.

The station had two platforms for the passing loop on the otherwise single line. It was larger than was usual for the line, the brick built station buildings consisting of two pavilions with a central connection, and with quoined door and window openings. There was a siding to the goods shed and coal yard. This branched off what was, in effect, an extended headshunt to the down side of the loop, and itself had a runaround loop built into it. This was extended in 1959 when the line was modernised by the Western Region. The up line also had a small carriage siding behind the platform with a staff cabin, again connected to the main line by a headshunt.

Initially the single line was operated on the "one engine in steam" principle. However, after completion to Stratford, absolute block working with them was introduced, with electric train staff working after 1894.

About four miles to the east, at Burton Dassett, was a connection with the abortive Edge Hill Light Railway.

A typical service, as in 1942, would be two through trains in either direction, with the addition of two to Stratford on Saturdays. The passenger service was withdrawn on 7 April 1952, although through traffic continued to gain access to the Great Western Railway at Fenny Compton until 5 July 1965.

A short distance to the east, there are military railway sidings serving an ammunition depot. The sidings are also used for rolling stock storage on behalf of British train operators. The area also had an extensive closed rail system used to train military railmen.

== Routes ==
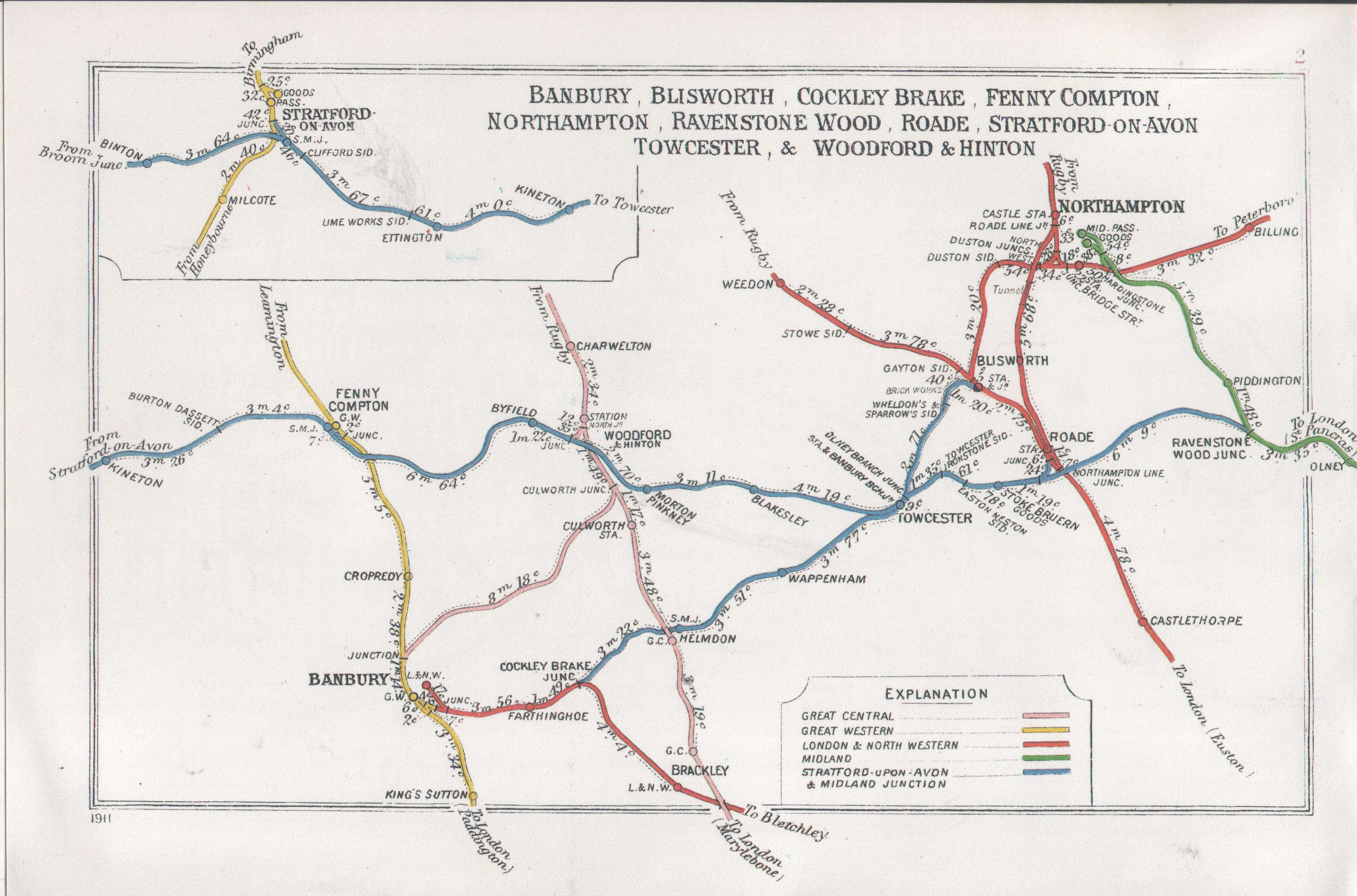
A 1911 Railway Clearing House map of railways in the vicinity of Kineton (far left, in blue)

Preceding station	Disused railways	Following station
Ettington	SMJR; East and West Junction Railway	Burton Dassett Halt
