= Burton Dassett railway station =

Former railway station in Warwickshire, England

Coordinates: 52.17037°N 1.44725°W

Burton Dassett Halt

General information
- Location: Temple Herdewyke, Stratford-on-Avon; England
- Platforms: 1

Other information
- Status: Disused

History
- Original company: East and West Junction Railway
- Pre-grouping: Stratford-upon-Avon and Midland Junction Railway
- Post-grouping: London, Midland and Scottish Railway

Key dates
- 1 June 1871: Opens as "Warwick Road"
- June 1873: Closed
- 1 December 1909: Reopened as "Burton Dassett Platform"
- c. July 1912: Closed
- c. 1933: Reopened as "Burton Dassett Halt"
- c. May 1946: Closed
Location

Burton Dassett Halt was a railway station on the former Stratford-upon-Avon and Midland Junction Railway in Warwickshire, England.

== History ==
It was opened in 1871, as Warwick Road by the East and West Junction Railway on its route from Stratford-upon-Avon to Fenny Compton near the village of Burton Dassett. However it was closed in 1873.

It was reopened as Burton Dassett Platform in 1909, by the newly formed Stratford-upon-Avon and Midland Junction Railway at the junction with the proposed Edge Hill Light Railway. However it closed again within three years, only to be opened once again in 1933, as Burton Dassett Halt. It then remained open until approximately 1946.

== Routes ==
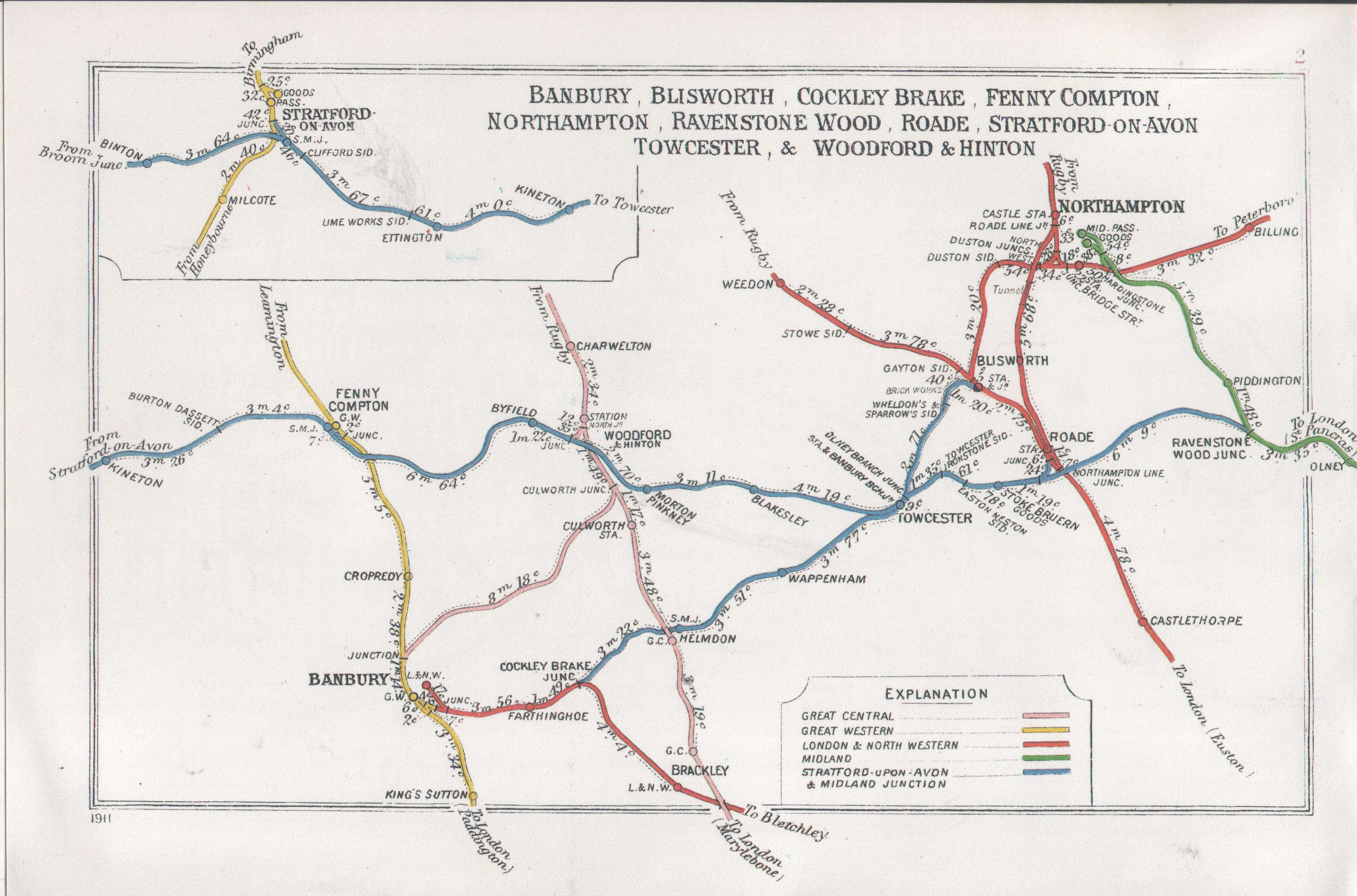
A 1911 Railway Clearing House map of railways in the vicinity of Burton Dassett (far left; only the sidings were open at the time the map was drawn)

Preceding station	Disused railways	Following station
Kineton	SMJR; East and West Junction Railway	North End
