= Fenny =

Fenny or Fenni may refer to

== People ==
- Fenni, an ancient people of northeastern Europe
- Fenny ten Bosch (1935–1959), Dutch tennis player
- Fenny Gaolaolwe, 21st century South African politician
- Fenny Heemskerk (1919–2007), Dutch chess Woman Grandmaster
- Fenny Nanyeni (born 1969), Namibian politician
- Fenny Tutjavi (born 2003), Namibian politician
- Achour Fenni, Algerian poet, translator and academician

== Places in England ==
- Fenny Castle, remains of a castle in Somerset
- Fenny Bentley, a village in Derbyshire
- Fenny Compton, a village and parish in Warwickshire
  - Fenny Compton railway station
  - Fenny Compton West railway station
- Fenny Drayton, a village in Leicestershire
- Fenny Stratford, a constituent town of Milton Keynes
  - Fenny Stratford railway station
- Fenny Castle, remains of a castle in Somerset

== Other uses ==
- A street name of fentanyl, a drug
- Fenny Airfield, a World War II United States Army Air Forces airfield in British India (now Bangladesh)
- Fenchurch (The Hitchhiker's Guide to the Galaxy), a character whose brother refers to her as Fenny
- Fenni or kheer, an Indian rice pudding

== See also ==
- Y Fenni cheese, a Welsh cheese
- Feni (disambiguation)
