= Stratford-upon-Avon and Midland Junction Railway =

UK railway line

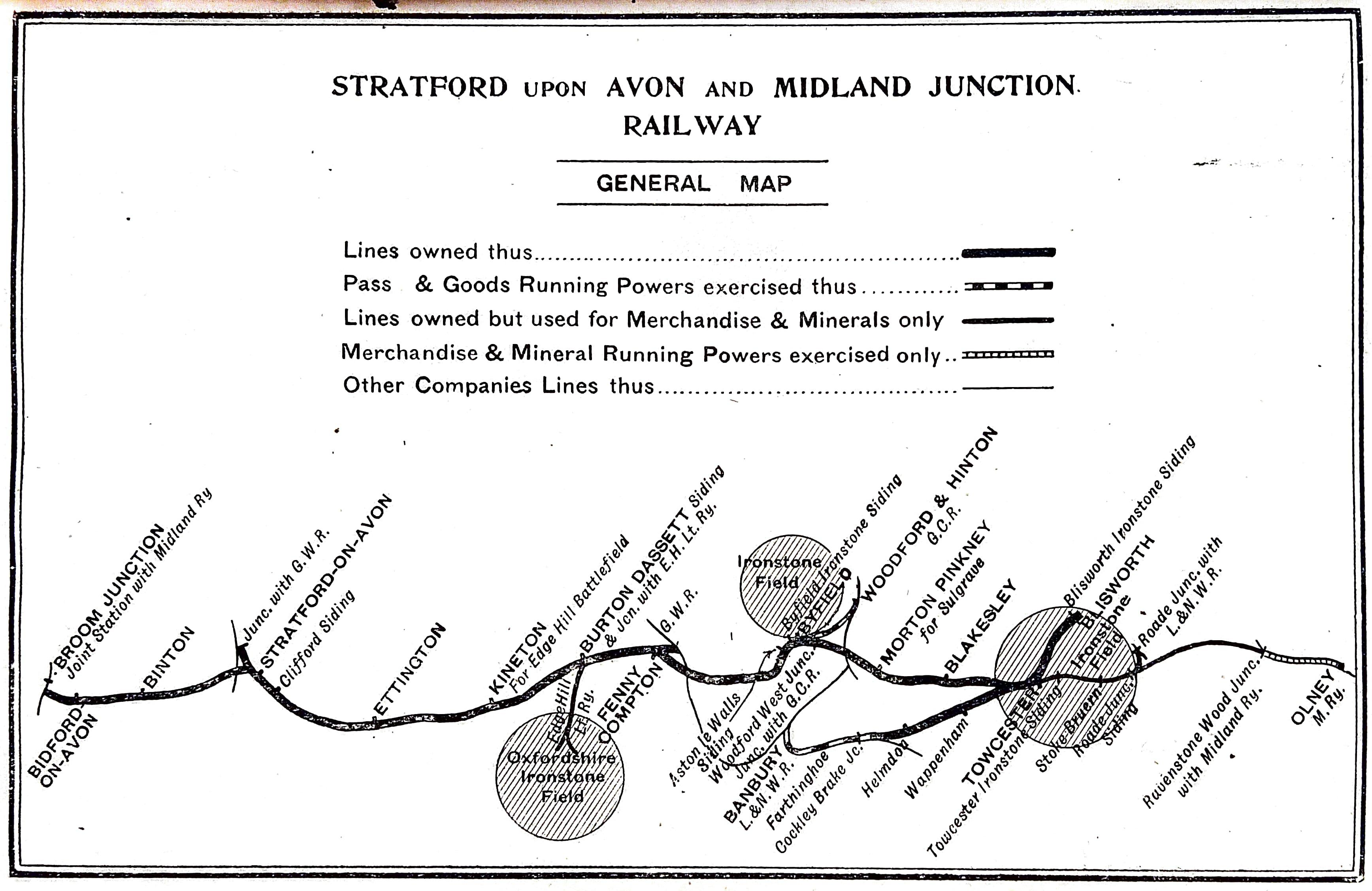
- 1920 map of the railway

Technical
- Track gauge: 4 ft 8 1/2 in (1,435 mm)
- Length: 67 miles 46 chains (108.8 km) (1919)
- Track length: 77 miles 52 chains (125.0 km) (1919)

The Stratford-upon-Avon and Midland Junction Railway (SMJR) was a railway company in the southern Midlands of England, formed at the beginning of 1909 by the merger of three earlier companies:

- the East and West Junction Railway,
- the Evesham, Redditch, and Stratford-upon-Avon Junction Railway, and
- the Stratford-upon-Avon, Towcester, and Midland Junction Railway.

In 1910 the Northampton and Banbury Junction Railway was purchased and an east–west network was formed which linked routes to Bedford and Northampton in the east to lines leading towards Banbury and Gloucester in the west, by way of Towcester and Stratford-on-Avon.

The constituent lines had each been built with a view to carrying Northamptonshire iron ore to South Wales and the West Midlands, but they were all unable to finance their planned lines in full. The formation of the SMJR in 1909 was in effect a financial reconstruction, but the management of the combined company also showed a certain flair for generating tourist income, based on the connection with Shakespeare and also the family connections with George Washington. Additionally, the line developed as a shorter route for Midland Railway goods traffic from the Bristol area to London.

Some upgrading of the poor-quality infrastructure was undertaken, and some heavy mineral flows – continuing until as late as 1960 – passed along the line, but the severe operational constraints led to the diversion of traffic to other routes in 1964. By that time all of the passenger traffic had dwindled to nothing and the line was closed down piece by piece. A short section of the original network remains in use serving a Ministry of Defence depot at Kineton.

== Origins ==
The Stratford-upon-Avon and Midland Junction Railway (SMJR) was formed by the combination of four railway companies. (Note: Three merged in 1909 and one joined by purchase the following year.) Those companies themselves had been formed with the intention of facilitating the transport of Northamptonshire iron ore to South Wales. The ironstone available to the South Wales iron-making industries had become scarce and was of poor quality, and there was huge demand. The Northamptonshire ore was not of the highest quality but it was abundantly available and conveying it to South Wales was worthwhile.

== The Northampton and Banbury Junction Railway ==
Northampton and Banbury Railway Act 1847
- Act of Parliament
- Parliament of the United Kingdom
- Long title: An Act for making a Railway from the Northampton and Peterborough Branch of the London and North-western Railway to the Town of Banbury, to be called "The Northampton and Banbury Railway;" and for other Purposes.
- Citation: 10 & 11 Vict. c. clxxviii

Dates
- Royal assent: 9 July 1847

Text of statute as originally enacted

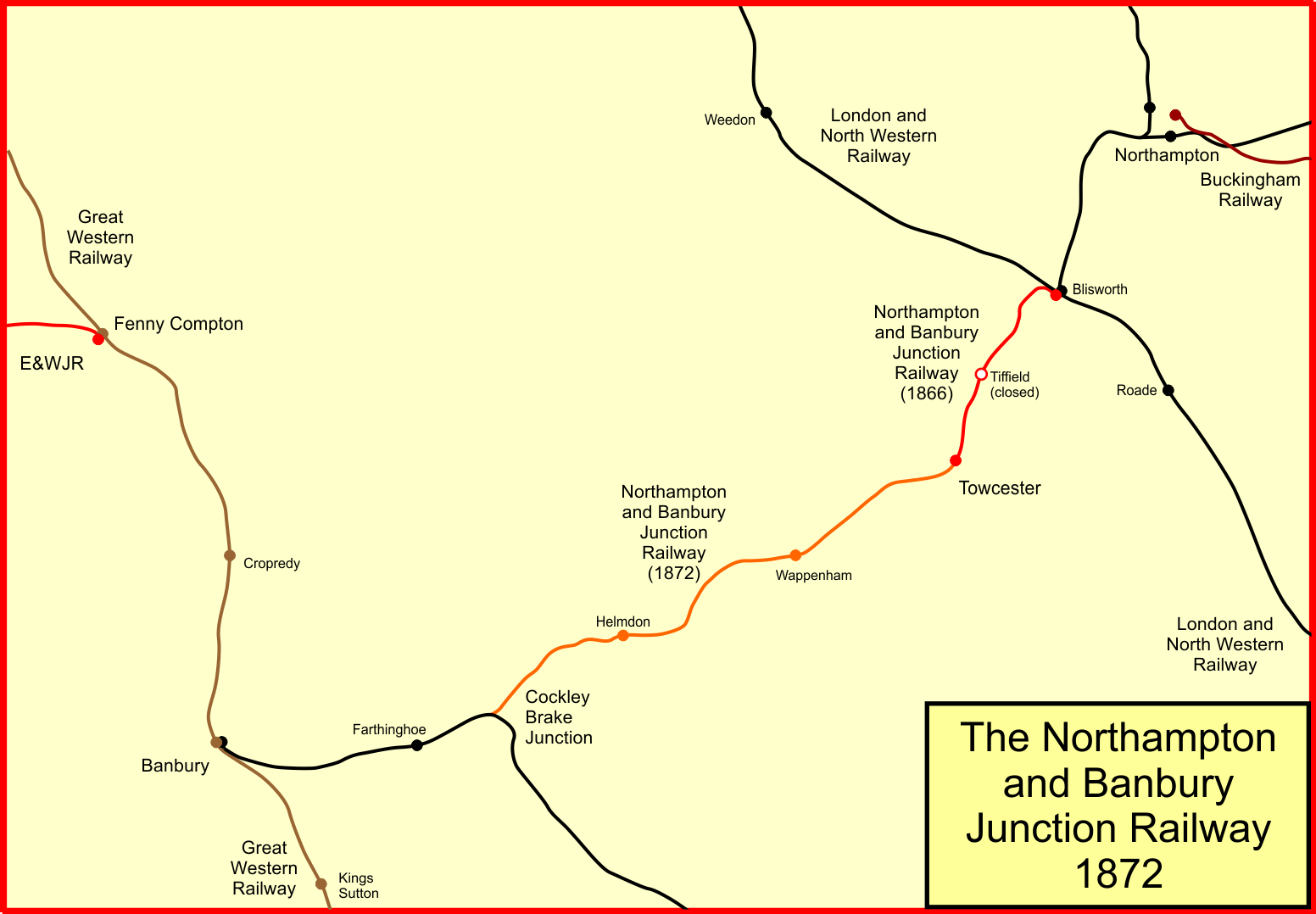
System map of the Northampton and Banbury Junction Railway

The Northampton and Banbury Railway was authorised by the Northampton and Banbury Railway Act 1847 (10 & 11 Vict. c. clxxviii) on 9 July 1847, with the intention of connecting the ironstone fields of Northamptonshire with a market for iron ore in South Wales. In the first instance it was to do this by connecting from Gayton Wharf, near Northampton, to the Buckinghamshire Railway, at Cockley Brake, near Banbury, running via Towcester. (Note: The Buckinghamshire Railway was authorised later in the same parliamentary session, by the merging of two smaller schemes from 1846.)

Northampton and Banbury Junction Railway Act 1863
- Act of Parliament
- Parliament of the United Kingdom
- Long title: An Act to authorize the Construction of a Railway in the County of Northampton, to be called "The Northampton and Banbury Junction Railway;" and for other Purposes.
- Citation: 26 & 27 Vict. c. ccxx

Dates
- Royal assent: 28 July 1863

Text of statute as originally enacted

In fact the ambitious scheme failed to raise the capital it needed to carry out its plans, and it had to obtain powers for an extension of time when the original authorisation lapsed; the second act, the Northampton and Banbury Junction Railway Act 1863 (26 & 27 Vict. c. ccxx), was passed on 28 July 1863; the name was changed to the Northampton and Banbury Junction Railway (N&BJR). Even then it was forced to content itself with a short line from Blisworth, on the London and North Western Railway (LNWR) main line to Towcester, opened on 1 May 1866. It built its own station at Blisworth alongside the LNWR station.

The N&BJR extended its line to Cockley Brake, approaching Banbury, on 1 June 1872, authorised by the Northampton and Banbury Junction Railway Act 1870 (33 & 34 Vict. c. cxxii). Goods traffic had been carried as far as Helmdon since August 1871. The extension was 15 miles (24 km) in length, and was constructed using very light permanent way materials, which caused difficulties later. The junction at Cockley Brake was over 5 miles (8 km) from Banbury, and running powers over the Buckinghamshire Railway were necessary to reach that place. The company was able to operate a passenger service from Blisworth through Towcester, Wappenham, Helmdon and Cockley Brake to Banbury. It worked the line itself with second hand engines acquired from the LNWR until 1875, from which time they were hired from that company throughout the remaining lifetime of the N&BJR.

Northampton and Banbury Railway (Branch) Act 1865
- Act of Parliament
- Parliament of the United Kingdom
- Long title: An Act to enable the Northampton and Banbury Junction Railway Company to make a Branch at Blisworth; to raise additional Capital; and for other Purposes.
- Citation: 28 & 29 Vict. c. ccclxi

Dates
- Royal assent: 5 July 1865

Northampton and Banbury Railway (Extensions) Act 1865
- Act of Parliament
- Parliament of the United Kingdom
- Long title: An Act to enable the Northampton and Banbury Junction Railway Company to extend their Railway to Chipping Norton and Blockey; and for other Purposes.
- Citation: 28 & 29 Vict. c. ccclxii

Dates
- Royal assent: 5 July 1865

Northampton and Banbury Junction Railway Act 1866
- Act of Parliament
- Parliament of the United Kingdom
- Long title: An Act to authorize the Northampton and Banbury Junction Railway Company to extend their Railway from Bloekley to Ross; and for other Purposes.
- Citation: 29 & 30 Vict. c. cccx

Dates
- Royal assent: 30 July 1866

Northampton and Banbury Junction Railway Act 1870
- Act of Parliament
- Parliament of the United Kingdom
- Long title: An Act for authorising an Extension of the existing railway of the Midland Counties and South Wales Railway Company to the Buckinghamshire Railway, and for reviving the powers and extending the time for purchase of lands and construction of works authorised by a former Act of the Company; and for suspending legal proceedings against the Company; and for altering the financial arrangements of the Company; and for other purposes.
- Citation: 33 & 34 Vict. c. cxxii

Dates
- Royal assent: 14 July 1870

Text of statute as originally enacted

Still intending to reach South Wales independently, the N&BJR obtained authorisation in the Northampton and Banbury Railway (Extensions) Act 1865 (28 & 29 Vict. c. ccclxii) for a further extension to Blockley, Gloucestershire, (near Moreton-in-Marsh) in 1865 and to Ross-on-Wye in 1866. This line would have turned south-west on the approach to Banbury; the company signalled its intention by changing its name to the Midland Counties and South Wales Railway. However it quickly became obvious that these ambitious plans—96 miles (154 km) of railway was contemplated at a cost of £1,250,000—were impossible to put into effect, and the company reverted to its former name. In fact the desired connecting line across the hills to Chipping Norton was built much later by the Banbury and Cheltenham Direct Railway, which opened on 6 April 1887. The Northampton and Banbury Junction Railway did not generate much passenger traffic, and the train service was limited to three or four return trains daily, but cattle proved a very successful traffic as Banbury cattle market grew in importance.

The small scale ironstone workings around Blisworth and Gayton (just over 1 mile (2 km) south-west of Blisworth on the N&BJR line) developed in the 1880s and with the advance of mechanisation so the workings expanded considerably; this later became an extensive site operated by Richard Thomas and Baldwins.

== The East and West Junction Railway ==
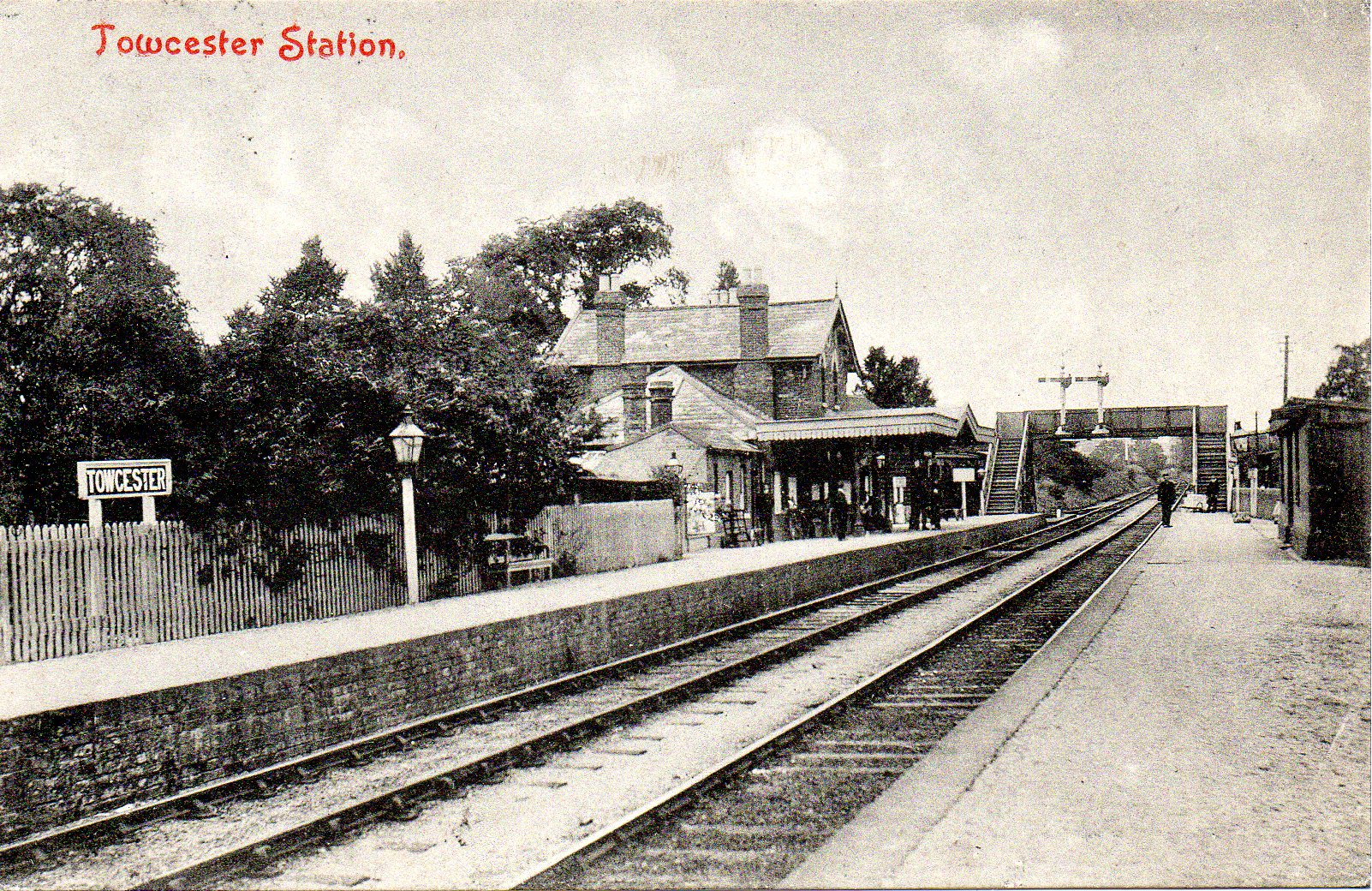
Towcester Railway Station, before 1912

East and West Junction Railway Act 1864
- Act of Parliament
- Parliament of the United Kingdom
- Long title: An Act for making a Railway from the Northampton and Banbury Junction Railway to the Great Western Railway at Stratford-on-Avon.
- Citation: 27 & 28 Vict. c. lxxvi

Dates
- Royal assent: 23 June 1864

The next line to be authorised was the East and West Junction Railway (E&WJR); it obtained its act of Parliament, the East and West Junction Railway Act 1864 (27 & 28 Vict. c. lxxvi), on 23 June 1864. It was to build a 33-mile (53 km) line from the Northampton and Banbury Junction Railway at Green's Norton Junction, a short distance west of Towcester, and to continue from there, crossing the Great Western Railway south of Fenny Compton, to join the Stratford on Avon Railway at Stratford-upon-Avon. (Note: The railways at Stratford were the Stratford on Avon Railway northwards and the former Oxford, Worcester and Wolverhampton Railway southwards; both were worked by the Great Western Railway and effectively integrated with it.) That was planned to give the E&WJR access both to Birmingham northwards and via Honeybourne south-westwards; the authorised line included running powers over the Northampton and Banbury Junction Railway between Towcester and Blisworth.

East and West Junction Railway (Capital) Act 1866
- Act of Parliament
- Parliament of the United Kingdom
- Long title: An Act to enable the East and West Junction Railway Company to raise further Money, and to create Preference Shares; and for other Purposes.
- Citation: 29 & 30 Vict. c. cxlii

Dates
- Royal assent: 28 June 1866

The huge authorised capital of £300,000 turned out to be not enough and in 1866 a further act, the East and West Junction Railway (Capital) Act 1866 (29 & 30 Vict. c. cxlii), for another £300,000 was passed. Also in the same year the company submitted a bill to extend from Towcester to join the Great Northern Railway (GNR) at Hitchin, on condition that the GNR subscribed £200,000. The evident objective was to create a further London connection in which the E&WJR would be a major partner. The GNR declined to make the financial commitment; powers to extend westward to Worcester were also considered, but that scheme was abandoned. Obtaining parliamentary authority to raise capital was one thing, but it proved much more difficult actually to obtain the money from potential subscribers.

On 1 June 1871 the first section of the line, from Fenny Compton to Kineton, a distance of six miles, was opened and a passenger service started over that section. They hired a contractor's engine for the purpose and later bought it, at which stage the locomotive became E&WJR no. 1.

East and West Junction Railway (Extension of Time) Act 1871
- Act of Parliament
- Parliament of the United Kingdom
- Long title: An Act to extend the time for the completion of the East and West Junction Railway.
- Citation: 34 & 35 Vict. c. lxxxi

Dates
- Royal assent: 29 June 1871

Text of statute as originally enacted

East and West Junction Railway Act 1874
- Act of Parliament
- Parliament of the United Kingdom
- Long title: An Act for empowering the East and West Junction Railway Company to raise further Money by Debenture Stock; with a special preference or priority attached thereto; and for other purposes.
- Citation: 37 & 38 Vict. c. cxcviii

Dates
- Royal assent: 7 August 1874

Text of statute as originally enacted

A further time extension had to be sought in Parliament, the East and West Junction Railway (Extension of Time) Act 1871 (34 & 35 Vict. c. lxxxi), and preference loans obtained to build further, but on 1 July 1873 the western (Stratford to Kineton) and eastern (Fenny Compton to Green's Norton Junction, Towcester) ends of the line were ready, and trains ran between Blisworth and Stratford. Between Blisworth and Green's Norton Junction this was by running powers over the Northampton and Banbury Junction Railway.

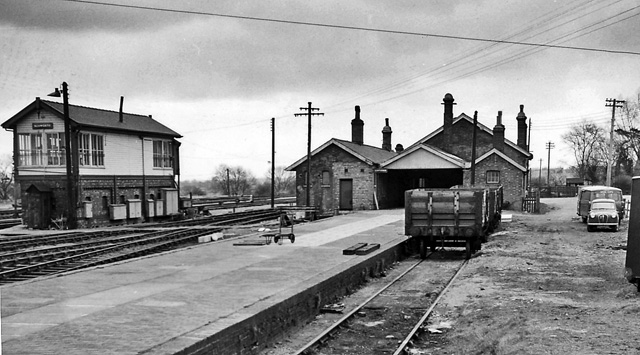
Blisworth railway station; the buildings on the right (not original) served the N&BJR line

At the Stratford end the company was to build its own station, but at first the Great Western Railway (GWR) station, accessed by a spur connection, was used. In June 1875 the E&WJR had a temporary station of its own ready and trains were transferred to that, and they opened a permanent station in January 1876.

However, soon after the opening, a newspaper believed that the E&WJR was using its own, separate station:

We hope to see the East and West Junction running into the Great Western line at this town. Every one is too familiar with the annoyances of a break in the line of communication, and travellers by the east and West Junction coming from the south and desirous of proceeding to Birmingham &c., have to land at one end of Stratford and journey by omnibus or car, or walk to the opposite extremity of the town, causing fatigue, anxiety, and delay... we hope some means will be used to effect a junction in the two lines, so that one station can be used, and the Great Western Company have a station in the Alcester-road, particularly accessible from the town.

From this time the London and North Western Railway ran through carriages from London Euston to Stratford via Blisworth.

Income on the E&WJR was so poor that it fell into receivership from 29 January 1875 to 1902. The passenger service was withdrawn from 31 July 1877 and not resumed until 2 March 1885. (Note: Resumption date from Quick, and newspaper report. Riley gives 22 March 1885, as does Railway Magazine November 1973, and 22 February 1885 is quoted by others. Quick states that these days were both Sundays and there was no Sunday service, so that the dates are not possible.)

The East and West Junction Railway, which runs from Stratford-on-Avon to Blisworth, a distance of about forty miles [60 km], was opened for passenger traffic on Monday [2 March 1885]."

== The Evesham, Redditch and Stratford-upon-Avon Junction Railway ==
Evesham, Redditch, and Stratford-upon-Avon Junction Railway Act 1873
- Act of Parliament
- Parliament of the United Kingdom
- Long title: An Act for making Railways to connect the Evesham and Redditch Railway with the East and West Junction Railway; and for other purposes.
- Citation: 36 & 37 Vict. c. ccxlv

Dates
- Royal assent: 5 August 1873

Text of statute as originally enacted

Evesham, Redditch and Stratford-upon-Avon Junction Railway Act 1885
- Act of Parliament
- Parliament of the United Kingdom
- Long title: An Act for the funding consolidation and capitalisation of certain debts liabilities and engagements of the Evesham Redditch and Stratford-upon-Ayon Junction Railway Company by the creation and issue of New Debenture Stock in lieu thereof and for other purposes.
- Citation: 48 & 49 Vict. c. clxxiv

Dates
- Royal assent: 6 August 1885

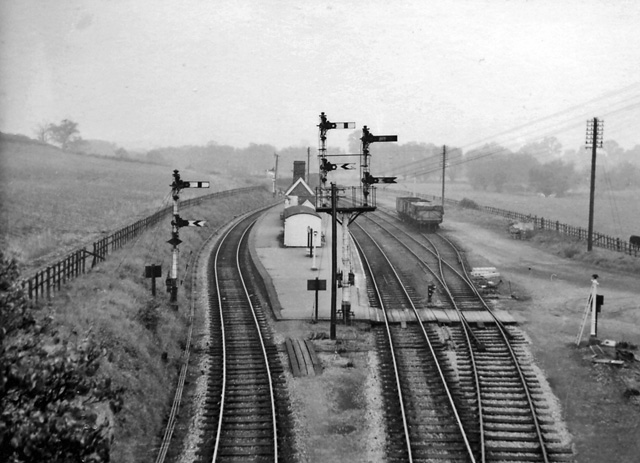
Broom Junction Station looking north

The E&WJR still saw its destiny in reaching further west, giving access ultimately to the iron industries of South Wales and the West Midlands, and if possible avoiding dependency on the powerful Great Western Railway (GWR) at Stratford. The Evesham and Redditch Railway (E&RR) had opened a north–south line in 1866, and was aligned to the Midland Railway. (Note: The Evesham and Redditch Railway was absorbed by the Midland Railway in 1882.) Its line lay only eight miles west of Stratford, and the E&WJR sponsored the promotion of the Evesham, Redditch and Stratford-upon-Avon Junction Railway (ER&SJR). This line was authorised by the Evesham, Redditch, and Stratford-upon-Avon Junction Railway Act 1873 (36 & 37 Vict. c. ccxlv) on 5 August 1873, and ran west from Stratford to a junction at Broom on the E&RR. The junction at Broom led towards Birmingham. The heavy mineral traffic was destined to move southwards, and the reversal in the restricted layout was to prove inconvenient.

It opened on 2 June 1879 and the seven mile line was worked by the E&WJR. Running powers were obtained to Redditch, but they were only exercised from the junction at Broom to the station there.

This line was immediately unprofitable and it too went into receivership, but continuing to trade, from 2 January 1886.

== The Stratford-upon-Avon, Towcester and Midland Junction Railway ==
Continuing its quest to find a connecting line that would be successful, the E&WJR now looked to the south-east. It observed that the Bedford and Northampton Railway opened its line in 1872; aligned to the Midland Railway it connected to the Midland main line to Bedford and London. Olney, on the B&NR, was only ten miles or so east of Towcester.

Stratford-upon-Avon, Towcester, and Midland Junction Railway Act 1882
- Act of Parliament
- Parliament of the United Kingdom
- Long title: An Act to confer further powers on the Easton Neston Mineral and Towcester, Roade and Olney Junction Railway Company, to change the name of the Company, and for other purposes.
- Citation: 45 & 46 Vict. c. ccix

Dates
- Royal assent: 10 August 1882

Text of statute as originally enacted

Stratford-upon-Avon, Towcester and Midland Junction Railway Act 1885
- Act of Parliament
- Parliament of the United Kingdom
- Long title: An Act to authorise the Stratford-upon-Ayon Towcester and Midland Junction Railway Company to divert a portion of their authorised Railway; and for other purposes.
- Citation: 48 & 49 Vict. c. cxliii

Dates
- Royal assent: 31 July 1885

Text of statute as originally enacted

Stratford-upon-Avon, Towcester and Midland Junction Railway Act 1887
- Act of Parliament
- Parliament of the United Kingdom
- Long title: An Act to authorise the Stratford-upon-Avon Towcester and Midland Junction Railway Company to create and issue Debenture Stock; and for other purposes.
- Citation: 50 & 51 Vict. c. xiv

Dates
- Royal assent: 29 March 1887

Text of statute as originally enacted

Stratford-upon-Avon, Towcester, and Midland Junction Railway Act 1889
- Act of Parliament
- Parliament of the United Kingdom
- Long title: An Act to extend the time for completing the main line of the Stratford-upon-Avon Towcester and Midland Junction Railway; to abandon certain branch railways; and for other purposes.
- Citation: 52 & 53 Vict. c. lxxvi

Dates
- Royal assent: 9 July 1889

Text of statute as originally enacted

Stratford-upon-Avon, Towcester and Midland Junction Railway Act 1892
- Act of Parliament
- Parliament of the United Kingdom
- Long title: An Act to authorise the transfer to the Depositors of the Stock remaining in Court in respect of the Stratford-upon-Avon Towcester and Midland Junction Railway.
- Citation: 55 & 56 Vict. c. cxxix

Dates
- Royal assent: 27 June 1892

In 1879 the East and West Junction Railway sponsored this line; it would build from Towcester to a junction near Olney (Ravenstone Junction). The proposed railway was called the Easton Neston Mineral and Towcester, Roade and Olney Junction Railway; it was incorporated by the Easton Neston Mineral and Towcester, Roade, and Olney Junction Railway Act 1879 (42 & 43 Vict. c. ccxxiii) on 15 August 1879, with share capital of £230,000. Running powers for goods and mineral trains were granted to the Midland Railway. The ten mile line took some time to construct due to difficulty in raising money, and before it opened the company changed its name to the Stratford-upon-Avon, Towcester and Midland Junction Railway (ST&MJR), by the Stratford-upon-Avon, Towcester, and Midland Junction Railway Act 1882 (45 & 46 Vict. c. ccix) of 10 August 1882.

In 1883 a joint committee was formed with the East and West Junction Railway to operate the line. It opened to goods traffic on 13 April 1891. The line crossed the LNWR main line at Roade, and a short spur for goods purposes was laid in to connect with that line. The spur was only used for exchange of goods wagons, and in later years the signalbox at the junction on the ST&MJR line was replaced by a ground frame; the daily goods train exchanging wagons waited at the ground frame while the fireman walked to the LNWR signalbox to collect the train staff for the line, returning to his train to unlock the ground frame with the key on the train staff.

A passenger service on the ST&MJR main line was inaugurated on 1 December 1892, operated by hiring in a Midland Railway locomotive and coaches, but this was unsuccessful and it ceased from 30 March 1893.

Cheap iron ore from Spain became easily available before the line opened, and abstracted most of the intended revenue. Nonetheless, the Midland Railway was quick to exploit the new shorter route from the West of England to London and by 1883 was working goods trains between Broom Junction and Olney with its own engines. The Midland Railway locomotives proved too heavy for the lightly constructed permanent way on the line and the local company's own engines were substituted.

The passenger station at Broom was an unadvertised exchange platform only at first, but it became a public station on 1 November 1880.

To add to the financial agonies, the ST&MJR was obliged to modernise the E&WJR lines, which had been built cheaply of poorly specified materials: £160,000 was to be spent; evidently the ST&MJR was in part intended as a means of financial manipulation to rescue the E&WJR. Nonetheless, the money was simply not available.

== The Great Central Railway ==
In 1893 the Manchester, Sheffield and Lincolnshire Railway (MS&LR) purchased £294,971 worth of shares in the East and West Junction Railway and £42,345 worth in the Evesham, Redditch and Stratford Junction Railway with an eye to future use, and the MS&LR now had majority voting in the two smaller companies. The MS&LR was planning its London extension, and it changed its name to the Great Central Railway (GCR) in 1897. When it opened the London extension line in 1899, the GCR provided a north-facing and a south-facing spur where it crossed the Stratford line at Byfield to Woodford on the GCR, opened 15 March 1899. It closed again to passenger trains in August 1899 and to goods traffic on 22 October 1900. While open, it carried the 5.20 pm train from London Marylebone to Byfield, which was then attached to the 7.17 pm Blisworth to Stratford train.

There was a north curve opened at the same time and it remained open much longer; the Marylebone to Stratford through carriage was slipped at Woodford and ran to Stratford over the north curve. The through carriage was operated from 16 June 1902. The curve closed to passengers on 31 May 1948 and to goods on 1 March 1965.

== The Stratford-upon-Avon and Midland Junction Railway ==
Stratford-upon-Avon, Towcester and Midland Junction Railway Act 1883
- Act of Parliament
- Parliament of the United Kingdom
- Long title: An Act to confer further powers on the Stratford-upon-Avon, Towcester and Midland Junction Railway Company in reference to their own Undertaking and the Undertaking of the East and West Junction Railway Company; and for other purposes.
- Citation: 46 & 47 Vict. c. ccxxviii

Dates
- Royal assent: 25 August 1883

Text of statute as originally enacted

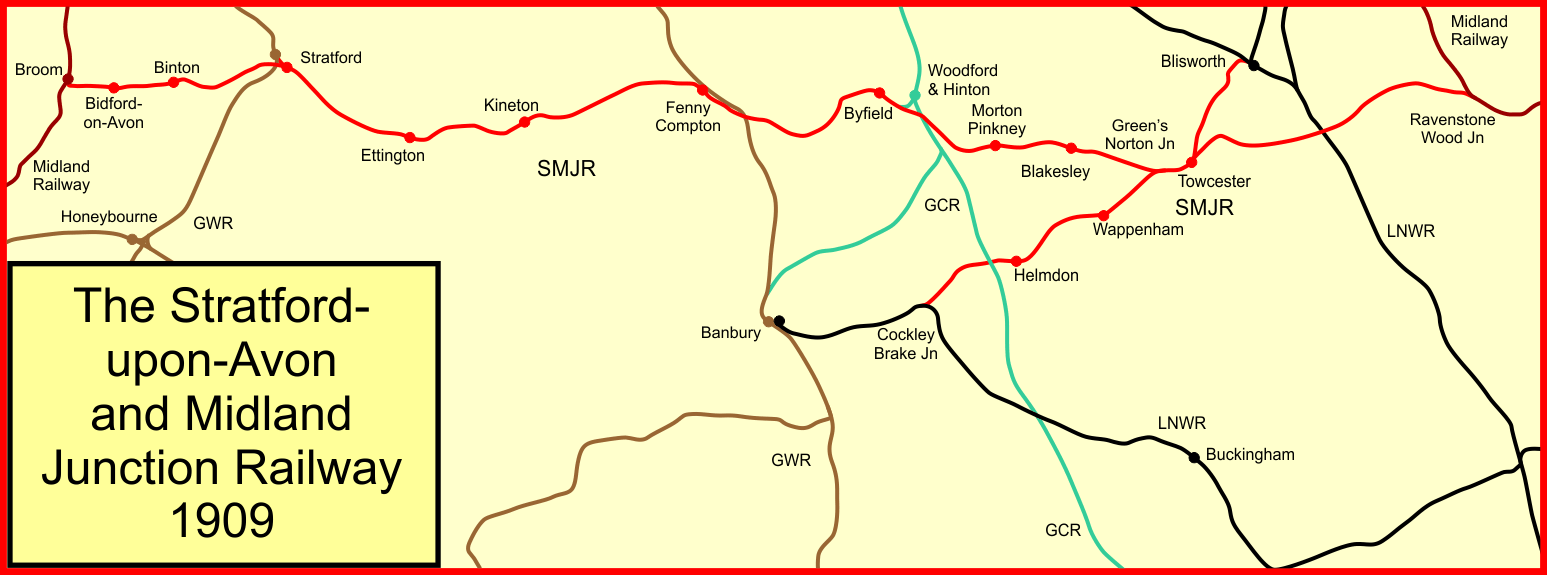
System map of the Stratford-upon-Avon and Midland Junction Railway

The three railways – the E&WJR, the ST&MJR, and the ER&SJR – were only notionally independent and the reality was given official recognition when the Stratford-upon-Avon, Towcester and Midland Junction Railway Act 1883 (46 & 47 Vict. c. ccxxviii) established a joint committee of the ST&MJR and E&WJR; and an act of Parliament of 13 April 1891 established a joint committee of the three lines, which could now openly work in concert. The network reached from the Midland Railway at Broom to the Midland at Olney, a west-to-east spread of nearly 60 miles.

The Midland Railway had been running through goods and mineral trains over the line between Broom and Olney for some time with its own engines, but the very light track on the SMJR line was experiencing serious damage, and from 8 December 1891 the Midland engines were taken off and the through traffic worked by SMJR engines.

Stratford-upon-Avon and Midland Junction Railway (Amalgamation) Act 1908
- Act of Parliament
- Parliament of the United Kingdom
- Long title: An Act for amalgamating the Undertakings of the Stratford-upon-Avon Towcester and Midland Junction Railway Company the Evesham Redditch and Stratford-upon-Avon Junction Railway Company and the East and West Junction Railway Company and for other purposes.
- Citation: 8 Edw. 7. c. lxxvii

Dates
- Royal assent: 1 August 1908

Text of statute as originally enacted

The joint committee had made strenuous efforts to sell its lines to a larger railway, ideally the Midland Railway, but notwithstanding the interest shown by the GCR, no company made an offer; the lines were still heavily loss-making and there was a huge backlog of modernisation and upgrading required. The joint committee decided to try to raise more money on the market, and to amalgamate their three lines formally, and to create £600,000 of capital. This was authorised by the Stratford-upon-Avon and Midland Junction Railway (Amalgamation) Act 1908 (8 Edw. 7. c. lxxvii) of 1 August 1908, by which the three railways were formed into the Stratford-upon-Avon and Midland Junction Railway (SMJR); the merger was effective on 1 January 1909, and the joint committee was dissolved on 21 April 1909. The attractiveness of investing in this new company must have been affected by the fact that the total population between Broom and Blisworth was only 18,000 in 1900: the only large settlements were Towcester (population 2,775) and Stratford-upon-Avon (8,500).

Stratford-upon-Avon and Midland Junction Railway (Various Powers) Act 1910
- Act of Parliament
- Parliament of the United Kingdom
- Long title: An Act for transferring to and vesting in the Stratford-upon-Avon and Midland Junction Railway Company the undertaking of the Northampton and Banbury Junction Railway Company to confer further powers on the Stratford-upon-Avon and Midland Junction Railway Company and for other purposes.
- Citation: 10 Edw. 7 & 1 Geo. 5. c. viii

Dates
- Royal assent: 29 April 1910

Text of statute as originally enacted

The Northampton and Banbury Junction Railway joined the new group by being purchased by the SMJR for £53,223. This was authorised by the Stratford-upon-Avon and Midland Junction Railway (Various Powers) Act 1910 (10 Edw. 7 & 1 Geo. 5. c. viii) of 29 April 1910, which took effect on 1 July 1910.

The chairman of the SMJR was Harry Willmott, and his son Russell Willmott was appointed traffic manager and engineer from 31 December 1913. The Willmotts were energetic in promoting the tourism potential of the line; in addition to the connection with Shakespeare at Stratford, there were considerable areas of natural beauty on the line, and combined tickets were issued for excursions including river trips and refreshments. Moreton Pinkney station was entitled Moreton Pinkney for Sulgrave from 10 January 1913 to build on the connection with the family of George Washington, who had inhabited Sulgrave Manor. The line was promoted in publicity material as The Shakespeare Route, and powers were obtained in 1910 to operate motor buses.

Certain economies in train mileage were possible after acquisition of the Northampton line, and the opportunity was taken to rationalise the junction at Greens Norton: the junction (and signalbox) was abolished by running a second single track from Towcester; two single tracks ran side by side, and for the expense of the additional track the signalmen's wages were saved.

For some time the Midland Railway had been using the route for its Bristol to London traffic, in competition with the Great Western Railway which had a more advantageous route. For a time this usage of the Stratford route flourished, but the Midland withdrew the lucrative banana traffic—5,500 tons and £1,100 in revenue annually—from Avonmouth to London, and also coal traffic to London, from 1912 or 1913. (Note: Jordan says that the Midland "reduced its use of the SMJ line from 1912 when it began to route its Gloucester to London goods traffic over its own metals through a junction at Wigston, near Leicester, on the main line to London." It is not clear what the Midland's alternative route was: the Nuneaton to Wigston line was a much faster line but was owned by the LNWR. The shortest all-Midland route was via Castle Donington, near Derby.) The long single line through Stratford with inevitable traffic delays and slow permitted speeds militated against reliable use of the line.

== Railophone ==
A means of instant communication with moving trains had long been wished for, and in 1910 an experiment was carried out on the line with the Railophone system that had been developed by an engineer by the name of Hans von Kramer. A demonstration set-up was installed on the SMJR line; an inductive conductor was placed along the track, and two sets of coils in the train were able to receive and transmit speech. Apparatus was fitted that enabled an electrical signal to the train to apply the train brakes in an emergency. A public demonstration of the system was arranged for 28 June 1912.

In view of the extraordinary number of terrible railway accidents that have occurred in different parts of the world during the last few months, the latest invention in the science of wireless electricity deserves far more public attention than has been given to it. [The invention] promises to create a beneficial revolution in railway traffic by making a train the safest as well as the most comfortable means of travelling. As soon as the "railophone" comes into general use a collision between two trains will practically be an impossibility. Moreover, the difficult art of the signalman will be transformed into a science. The reach and flexibility of the arm of the law will be marvellously extended to the detriment of wrongdoers flying from justice; and a passenger on an English express, while travelling along at 60 miles per hour [100 km/h] will soon be able to hold a quiet conversation with a person as far away as Astrakan. Mr Hans von Kramer, the inventor of the "railophone," is an electrical engineer of Birmingham. He has worked on the old idea of electro-magnetic induction discovered by Faraday about 80 years ago.

The demonstration was evidently a technical success; as well as showing that trains could be stopped remotely, von Kramer accidentally leant on the activation button and a movement shunting to the platform was instantly stopped. Nonetheless, the cost of installing the system on a widespread basis seems to have deterred its general adoption.

== From 1914 ==
During World War I the railways came under the control of the Railway Executive Committee, and leisure travel was discouraged.

On 24 May 1917 the connection at Roade to the LNWR was removed, and the track materials were reused elsewhere.

During the war there was heavy demand for iron ore for the materiel of war. Harry Willmott drew attention to the large deposits of easily winnable iron ore near Burton Dassett; 30 million tons were claimed to be accessible. A suggestion from Willmott that the government might wish to support a railway to get access to the deposits did not find favour, and commercial interests combined to build an access line privately. The ironstone was to be extracted by the Edge Hill Ironstone Company.

== The Edge Hill Light Railway ==
A provisional railway company, the Edge Hill Light Railway, was formed, and the engineer and manager Colonel Stephens was engaged to plan the line. Eleven miles of railway were designed including an incline at 1 in 6 to reach an altitude of 700 feet (210 m). Capital was to be £200,000. However, there was intense local opposition on the grounds of spoilt amenity. The resulting negotiations resulted in a railway network planned to be less than 6 miles (10 km) in extent, with capital of £90,000, joining the SMJR lines at Burton Dassett.

A light railway order, the Edge Hill Light Railway Order 1919 (Cmd. 56), was issued on 28 January 1919; the track was to be standard gauge. The incline was on the balanced system, with descending loaded wagons hauling empties upwards by a cable. Two former London, Brighton and South Coast Railway "terrier" locomotives and a former Manning Wardle 0-4-0ST locomotive were engaged on the construction work.

The mines started production on 22 January 1922, obviously too late to assist in the war effort, and the railway started work in June 1922. Indeed, the market for the ore was not what had been assumed; the quality was indifferent and the demand was considerably reduced. Production ceased on 27 January 1925, at first apparently temporarily but the work never resumed.

== After 1923 ==
The railways of Great Britain were "grouped" following the Railways Act 1921; the SMJR was a subsidiary of the new London, Midland and Scottish Railway (LMS), and the Midland Railway and the LNWR were constituents of it. The SMJR consisted of 67 miles (108 km) of route and had a capital value of £600,000. Ordinary shareholders received 39% of their shareholding face value in cash. A dividend of 1% had been paid in 1921 and 0.5% in 1922.

The LMS was in competition with the GWR and in 1927–28 it put in hand work to upgrade the line to use it for traffic from Bristol and Avonmouth. Track was relaid and upgraded, with extensions to the passing loops, and signalling systems were improved. Banana specials ran on the route once more, a remarkably lucrative traffic. The speed limit on the line was raised to 45 mph (72 km/h).

For some years the railways had been giving attention to the economical carriage of passengers on very lightly used lines. A number of options were tried, and in 1931 the LMS arranged with the company Karrier of Huddersfield, who produced a vehicle that came to be called the "Ro-railer". It strongly resembled an ordinary 26-seat single decker bus; the bodywork was supplied by Cravens of Sheffield. It had pneumatic-tyred road wheels and railway wheels as well. The railway wheels were wood laminate; a wooden ramp was provided at the changeover point and the driver steered so as to descend on to the rails. The road wheels had to be raised manually and locked; the process took about five minutes. There were separate transmission gear boxes for road and rail with a faster ratio on the rail system. On 22 January 1931 there was a press demonstration, then the vehicle entered ordinary service between the Welcombe Hotel near Stratford and Stratford station, by road, and from there it ran by rail to Blisworth.

It was modified in 1932, with pneumatic wheel jacks and a reduction in weight to about 6 tons.

The vehicle was prone to failure and had difficulties on gradients; it was not able to run on a fast main line so passengers still needed to change at the main line junction. It ceased to run from 2 July 1932, being regarded as an unsuccessful experiment, and the journey was replaced by a steam train connecting with taxis in the ordinary way.

Broom Junction was awkwardly laid out for the dominant mineral traffic heading from Northamptonshire towards South Wales, as it required reversal at the station. Engines working through required to turn on the turntable. On 28 September 1942 a south curve was opened by the LMS enabling direct running without entering Broom station. The SMJR passenger service between Stratford and Broom was closed temporarily on 16 June 1947, and the closure was made final on 23 May 1949.

== Nationalisation ==
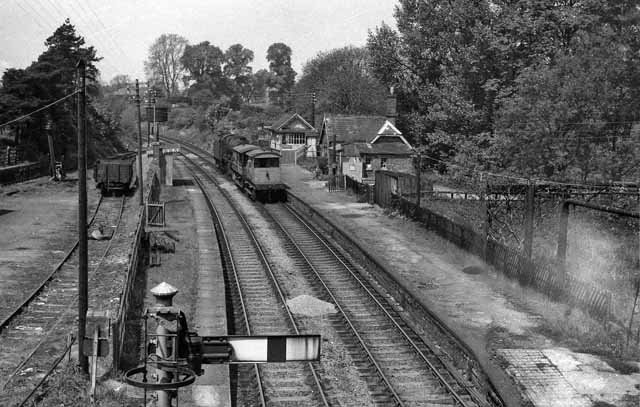
Byfield railway station in 1963

At the beginning of 1948 the railways of Great Britain were once again reorganised compulsorily by government; this time they were taken into national ownership, as British Railways. As a result, the management of the SMJR line was divided organisationally between the London Midland Region and the Western Region: the boundary was at Fenny Compton.

Local passenger services in thinly populated rural areas had long been hit hard by more efficient road bus operations, and the new British Railways management, under pressure to reduce losses, looked hard at the value for money of the SMJR passenger work. The passenger service over the northward spur to the Great Central line, Byfield to Woodford Halse, ceased to have a passenger service from 31 May 1948.

In 1950 they reported that passenger bookings between Blisworth and Stratford were two per day, from Ettington one per month, and from Kineton one per day. It was obvious that the passenger service would have to close, and the last passenger train ran on 5 April 1952. The goods service continued until 1965. The Banbury to Towcester and Blisworth service closed earlier on 2 July 1951, followed soon by the goods service on that route, on 29 October 1951.

Conversely the core SMJR route had a strategic, long-distance potential, and from 4 June 1951 four through freight trains each way daily were routed from the Great Central line at Woodford to Broom South Junction, continuing through Ashchurch to South Wales.

The line between Ravenstone Junction and Towcester closed after 8 June 1958. (Note: Riley states "The line between Ravenstone Junction and Towcester was still heavily used for freight trains between Wales and the north east of England until June 8, 1958" but it is difficult to see how that transit made use of the Towcester line.)

After the initial opening of the East and West Junction line, the layout at Fenny Compton placed the two railways side by side, with only a siding connection for exchange of goods wagons between the two. The SMJR line crossed over the GWR by a bridge further south. On 7 March 1960 however a new junction was installed at the station, providing a shorter route for iron ore trains from Banbury to South Wales than the former route by way of Leamington. A new staging yard was provided at Honeybourne West Junction.

The connection at Fenny Compton was commissioned on 7 March 1960. A new south facing curve at Stratford was opened on 13 June 1960, as part of the same scheme. Line and signalling improvements had been implemented in addition. However the Oxfordshire Ironstone Company's operations did not have a long life, closing down completely at Banbury on 2 October 1967.

During 1964 and 1965 all the residual local traffic was closed down and through transits were diverted away. The only remaining operational part of the former SMJR system was the connection from Fenny Compton to Kineton Ministry of Defence Establishment. The branch stub was transferred to the Ministry of Defence on 19 July 1971, and is worked by them with their own locomotives.

== Locomotives ==
The Northampton and Banbury Junction Railway ordered four locomotives for the start of its service, from Neilson of Glasgow. However it was unable to produce the cash to pay for them. In difficulty, the N&BJR hired in two locomotives from I W Boulton. One was ex-LNWR No. 1125, a 2-2-2 of 1866: it was in very poor condition, as the other engine, The Owl, about which little detail is recorded. The arrangements actually made are unknown, until 1866 when the LNWR worked the line until 1872. From that year the N&BJR acquired three engines second hand from the LNWR and worked its own trains the engines were a Tayleur 0-6-0 LNWR No. 1827, a Sharp, Stewart 0-4-2T No. 1831, and a Hawthorn 0-6-0 No. 1849. By 1876 the N&BJR was unable to continue working its own trains and the LNWR stepped in once again.

The East and West Junction Railway started its basic train service with the 1866 Manning Wardle 0-6-0ST used by the contractor in the construction of the line. In 1873 six locomotives were ordered on the hire purchase system from Beyer, Peacock and Company; the Birmingham Railway Carriage and Wagon Company provided the financing. After about a year in service, the E&WJR was unable to keep up the payments and the locomotives were repossessed. Two second hand engines were now acquired, brought from France by the contractor Crampton. They were in very poor condition but they worked on the lines for some time. In 1875 two 0-6-0ST locomotives were hired in from I. W. Boulton.

In 1876 the E&WJR acquired two Fairlie locomotives that had been built for a Mexican Railway; one was a double Fairlie 0-6-6-0 and became No. 1; the other was an 0-4-4T and became No. 2. They were disposed of in 1878, and some unknown engines were hired in from I. W. Boulton.

In 1879 an 0-6-0ST was supplied by Beyer Peacock, allocated E&WJR No. 1, the third to bear the number, to work to Broom, but its water tank capacity proved too small and it was sold on. Nos. 2, 3 and 4 were Beyer Peacock double-framed 0-6-0s built in 1880, 1881 and 1885. Nos. 5 and 6 followed from Beyer, Peacock, but were 2-4-0Ts for passenger traffic, and were fitted with Westinghouse brake.

In August 1888 a 2-4-0T was acquired second hand from the Potteries, Shrewsbury and North Wales Railway; it was named Hope and became the fourth No. 1 on the line, working on the Broom route. Three more second-hand engines were bought from the LNWR in December 1891; they were DX class 0-6-0 goods engines and worked between Olney and Broom.

Next came three 0-6-0s from Beyer Peacock, numbered 10 11 and 12; they were fitted with dual brakes. No. 13 was a 2-4-0 express engine from Beyer, Peacock, in 1903. Five more Beyer, Peacock 0-6-0s followed (Nos. 14 to 18) in quick succession, ordered by the E&WJR but financed at the end by the formation of the SMJR. Finally the SMJR ordered a second hand Stroudley "Large C" class 0-6-0 from the LBSCR; built in 1884 it arrived in November 1920.

The Edge Hill Light Railway acquired two LBSCR Terrier 0-6-0Ts and one or other of them, regarded as spare by the Edge Hill Railway, was occasionally put on passenger trains on the Broom line.

When the LMS absorbed the SMJR line, most of the locomotive stock was soon classified as life expired, and in due course Midland Railway pattern 0-6-0 types became dominant. When the Ro-railer was taken off the Welcombe Hotel run, three 0-4-4T engines were brought in to operate on the line. Former Lancashire and Yorkshire Railway engines worked in from Northampton in this period.

The improvements made to the track by the LMS aided the engine power situation considerably as heavier types could be used, and in fact after 1945 the former War Department Austerity 2-8-0 class were commonly used on the line, as well as other heavy types.

== Description of a ride on the line ==
In August 1955 a writer took a footplate ride on a goods train along the SMJR line from Towcester to Stratford. The journey took five hours for thirty or so miles. Although the passenger service was no more, the line was remarkably busy, and the relative infrequency of passing places made progress slow.

The train left Towcester punctually at 10.12 am hauled by a class "4F" 0-6-0 with 19 wagons and a brake van. An eastbound train crossed at Towcester station.

"A run of about ten minutes with speed round about 20 m.p.h. [30 km/h] brought the train into Blakesley, where... [a] stop of five minutes was made to allow another eastbound train to pass... The next section is a long one, reaching to Woodford Halse... A steady climb, at places 1 in 100, brings the railway to Woodford, and for a short while it runs close to the Marylebone main line, until it crosses it a few hundred yards south of Woodford Halse Station. Exchange sidings are provided here with the former Great Central line, and the passenger service used to run in and out of the passenger station on the main line."

At Woodford, a wagon was left and another picked up.

"The train then drew forward to await the arrival from Stratford of the crew who were to work it on. Most day rotas change here, the Northampton men working a train back over the eastern part of the line, and the Stratford men returning to the west... the Stratford freight was very late in arriving, and [our train] had to wait a full hour before proceeding on its way. A train of 20 empties ran through without stopping... to be followed a few minutes later by another [engine] and 12 wagons, manned by the Stratford crew. Once the train had run in, the two crews quickly changed locomotives, and in a few minutes both were once again on their way."

A wagon was picked up at Byfield.

"Occasional excursions are still run from this station to London via Blisworth... At Byfield Ironstone Sidings another stop was made beside the ground frame, and 15 empties were shunted on to one of the sidings to be filled with ore. This left only six wagons to continue the journey."

The train arrived at Fenny Compton and there was a half hour delay until an engine with two brake vans arrived from the section ahead. The writer's train ran the next mile or two to Burton Dassett.

"The large W.D. [War Department] depot here brings a good deal of traffic to this section, and after a lengthy halt outside the yard instructions were given to run through and reverse into the sidings. Three small W.D. tank [engines] were in evidence... Once the local freight was clear of the line, a heavy W.D. special backed slowly out of the depot yards and on to the running line. This train consisted of 35 wagons, and was... soon on its way westward to Stratford and beyond... The line was now clear for shunting, but such is the layout here that it was quite a complicated business to pick up eight wagons and detach one. However, the job was completed eventually, and the train remarshalled, though a further wait was necessary until the 1.15 p.m. from Stratford arrived. This train of 21 wagons... reached Burton Dassett considerably behind schedule, and after one hour spent in the sidings here [our train] left on the last stage of its journey at 2.30 p.m."

At Kineton a wagon was to be picked up. Five hours after leaving Towcester, the train arrived at Stratford Old Town Station...

== Topography ==
Northampton and Banbury Junction Railway

- Blisworth; opened 1 May 1866; closed 7 April 1952; the main line station continued in use until 4 January 1960;
- Tiffield; open from October 1869; closed after February 1871;
- Towcester; opened 1 May 1866; closed 7 April 1952;
- Green's Norton Junction; divergence of E&WJR line from 1873 until 1919 when point of junction altered to Towcester station;
- Wappenham; opened 1 June 1872; closed 2 July 1951;
- Helmdon; opened 1 June 1872; renamed Helmdon Village 1950; closed 2 July 1951;
- Cockley Brake Junction; joined line to Banbury.

East and West Junction Railway, including the Evesham, Redditch and Stratford-upon-Avon Junction Railway

- Green's Norton Junction; above;
- Blakesley; opened 1 July 1873; closed 1 August 1877; reopened 2 March 1885; closed 7 April 1952; (Note: Quick remarks that the reopening date for stations Blakesley to Stratford was 2 March 1885; the re-opening date of 22 February and 22 March given in Jordan and Greville & Spence were both Sundays and cannot be correct as there was no Sunday service.)
- Morton Pinkney; opened 1 July 1873; closed 1 August 1877; reopened 2 March 1885; closed 7 April 1952;
- Woodford West Junction; trailing junction for spurs from GCR main line 1899 to 1965;
- Byfield; opened 1 July 1873; closed 1 August 1877; reopened 2 March 1885; closed 7 April 1952;
- Fenny Compton; line opened 5 June 1871 and probably used the GWR station; own station opened 1 July 1873; closed 1 August 1877; reopened 2 March 1885; closed 7 April 1952;
- North End; opened from August 1872; closed 1 August 1877;
- Burton Dassett Junction; divergence of Edge Hill Light Railway 1920 to 1925;
- Warwick Road; opened December 1871; closed June 1873 or later; Burton Dassett on same site: station for Army camp not in public timetable, open from 1 December 1909 until 1912, and from 1933 to 1946;
- Kineton; opened 5 June 1871; closed 1 August 1877; reopened 2 March 1885; closed 7 April 1952;
- Ettington; opened 1 July 1873; closed 1 August 1877; reopened 2 March 1885; closed 7 April 1952;
- Stratford-on-Avon; often alternatively spelt Stratford-upon-Avon; divergence of E&WJR spur to GWR line 1873 to 1965, and of BR spur southwards 1960 to 1965; line from Fenny Compton opened 1 July 1873; closed 1 August 1877; reopened 2 June 1879 as terminus of new service from Broom Junction; original service restored 2 March 1885; closed 7 April 1952; at some times known as Stratford-on-Avon New Street; (Note: Riley says that the station was renamed Stratford Old Town about 1950, and this term is used by Maund and Beacock, but it is not supported by other sources, and may only have been an unofficial term. The designation does not appear in any of the timetables reproduced in Riley or Jordan, and only in Riley's diagram.)
- Binton; opened 2 June 1879; closed 16 June 1947;
- Bidford; opened May 1881; renamed Bidford-on-Avon 1 July 1909; closed 19 February 1917; reopened 1 January 1919; closed 16 June 1947; the 1947 closure was stated to be temporary, owing to the fuel crisis but the station never reopened;
- Broom East Junction; divergence of southwards LMS spur 1942 to 1962;
- Broom Junction; convergence with Evesham and Redditch Railway northwards.

Stratford-upon-Avon, Towcester and Midland Junction Railway

- Towcester; above;
- Stoke Bruern; (Note: The village is spelt Stoke Bruerne.) opened 1 December 1892; closed after last train on 30 March 1893 "owing to intervention of Easter";
- Roade Junction; spur to Roade LNWR;
- Salcey Forest; opened 1 December 1892; closed after last train on 30 March 1893 "owing to intervention of Easter";
- Ravenstone Wood Junction; convergence with line from Northampton to Bedford.

The lines were undulating with ruling gradients of about 1 in 80 and lengthy climbs averaging 1 in 100. There was a significant summit at Tiffield between Blisworth and Towcester; again approaching Morton Pinkney, near Byfield and near Fenny Compton; and at Ettington Lime Works, a mile west of Ettington station. he line to Ravenstone Wood Junction was also undulating at 1 in 100 with a mile of 1 in 82, and the Midland Railway section onward to Olney fell at 1 in 75 and 1 in 70 for four miles. The Cockley Brake line climbed continuously to a summit a mile east of Cockley Brake, the final ascent being over a mile of 1 in 65, followed by a fall of over a mile at 1 in 70.

== The Stratford-upon-Avon and Midland Junction Railway today ==
Today the only part of the former SMJR network still open is the 5 miles (8 km) section between Fenny Compton and the Ministry of Defence depot, Kineton.

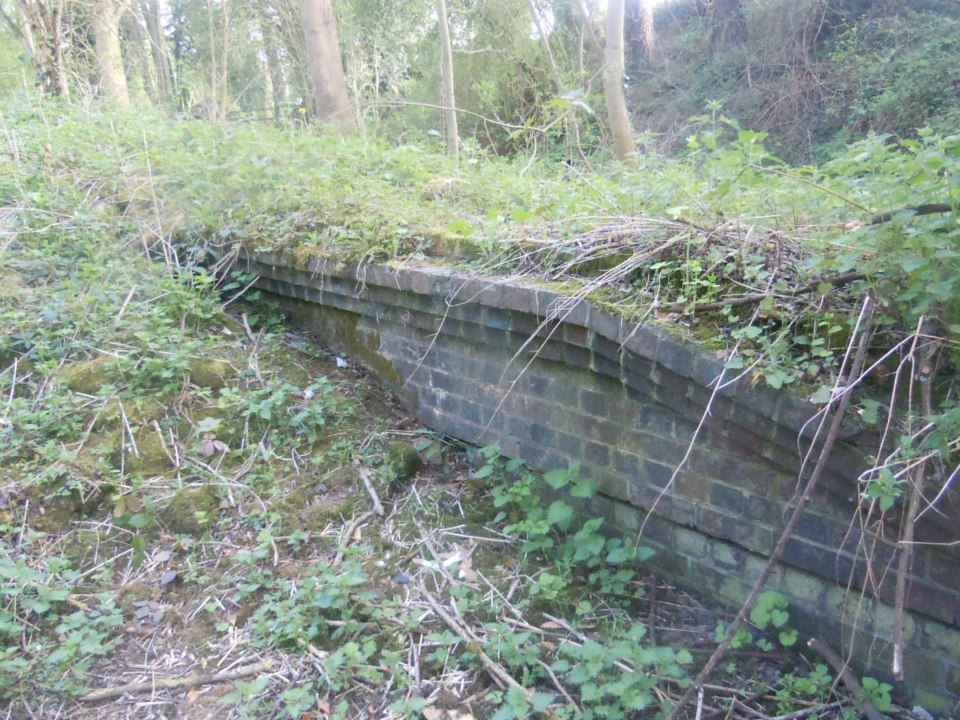
One of the platforms at Byfield, now partly buried and in a heavy state of decay
