= Ettington railway station =

Former railway station in Warwickshire, England

Ettington
- Site of Ettington Station

General information
- Location: Ettington, Stratford-on-Avon; England
- Coordinates: 52.14892°N 1.60624°W
- Grid reference: SP270501
- Platforms: 2

Other information
- Status: Disused

History
- Original company: East and West Junction Railway
- Pre-grouping: SuA&MJR
- Post-grouping: London, Midland and Scottish Railway; Western Region of British Railways

Key dates
- 1 July 1873: Station opens
- 1 August 1877: Closed
- 22 February 1885: Reopened
- 7 April 1952: Station closes
Location

Ettington railway station was a railway station that served the village of Ettington in Warwickshire, England.

== History ==
Opened on 1 July 1873 the station was situated on the East and West Junction Railway route from Stratford-upon-Avon to Fenny Compton.

The station had two platforms with a passing loop for the otherwise single line. Its buildings were of brick and to a design virtually standard for the line. There was a small waiting shelter on the down platform, access to which was by a barrow crossing. There were three sidings including one each to the goods shed and cattle pens.

Four years after opening the station had its passenger service withdrawn due to lack of business. An extension to Broom Junction was incorporated in 1873 by means of a railway called the Evesham Redditch and Stratford-upon-Avon Junction Railway which opened in 1879. As trade picked up, the station was reopened on 22 February 1885.

The line became part of the Stratford-upon-Avon and Midland Junction Railway in a merger of 1908 and at grouping in 1923 it became part of the London, Midland and Scottish Railway.

The LMS found it a useful link between its Bristol and London routes in competition with GWR goods traffic to the Capital.

In common with normal single line working, tokens would be exchanged at the signal boxes associated with each station loop. Initially there was one block from Stratford to Ettington, and another from Ettington to Kineton. In 1911 the facility was added to switch Ettington box out during the night, and work with one long block - a novel system at that time.

The station closed on 7 April 1952 although through traffic continued to gain access to the Great Western Railway until 5 July 1965.

During the Second World War the station was used to transport munitions and troops to nearby RAF Wellesbourne Mountford. There is little evidence of the station left apart from one of the goods sheds and the site is now used as a timber merchants and stables.

== Routes ==
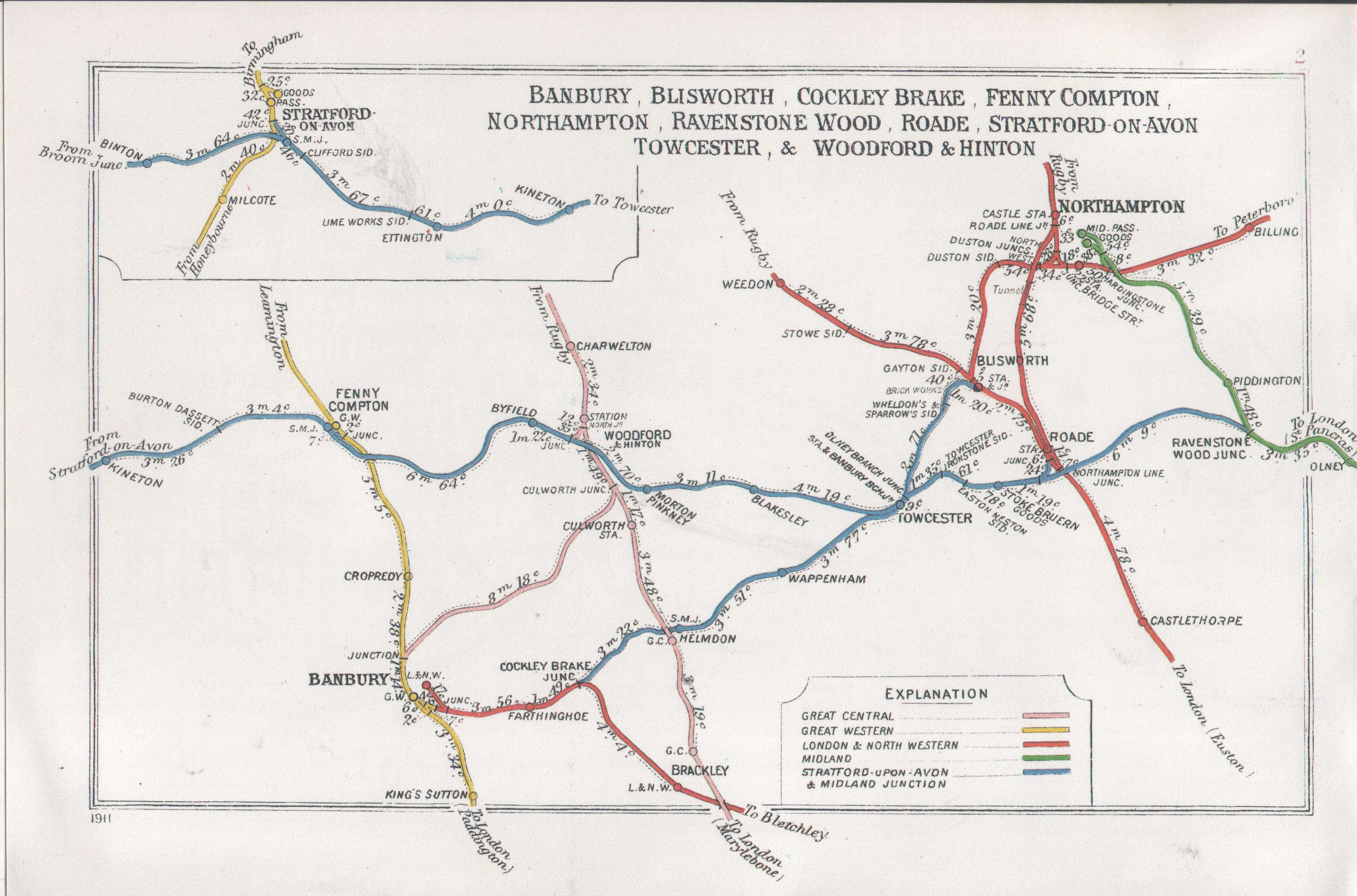
A 1911 Railway Clearing House map of railways in the vicinity of Ettington (upper left panel, in blue)

Preceding station	Disused railways	Following station
Stratford-upon-Avon (Old Town)	SMJR; East and West Junction Railway	Kineton
