= North End railway station =

Former railway station in Warwickshire, England

Coordinates: 52.1747°N 1.4314°W

North End

General information
- Location: Northend, District of Stratford-on-Avon; England
- Platforms: ?

Other information
- Status: Disused

History
- Original company: East and West Junction Railway

Key dates
- 1 June 1871: Opened
- June 1873: Closed
- April 1874: Reopened
- 1 August 1877: Closed
Location

North End railway station was a short-lived timber-framed station opened in 1871 by the East and West Junction Railway on its route from Stratford-upon-Avon to Fenny Compton.

It was not well patronised and closed within two years. A further attempt to operate it the following year lasted until 1877. There are no known existing photographs of the station due to its short working life and unremarkable appearance.

== Routes ==
Preceding station	Disused railways	Following station
Burton Dassett Halt	East and West Junction Railway	Fenny Compton West
