= Temple Herdewyke =

English village

Coordinates: 52.166°N 1.445°W

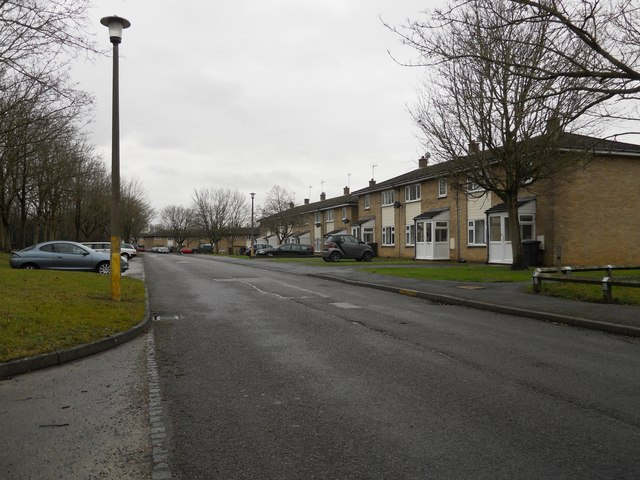
- Ministry of Defence housing at Temple Herdewyke

- Location within Warwickshire
- District: Stratford-on-Avon
- Shire county: Warwickshire
- Region: West Midlands
- Country: England
- Sovereign state: United Kingdom
- Post town: SOUTHAM
- Postcode district: CV47
- Dialling code: 01926
- Police: Warwickshire
- Fire: Warwickshire
- Ambulance: West Midlands
- UK Parliament: Kenilworth and Southam

Temple Herdewyke is a village in Warwickshire, England, that was built to house staff at Defence Munitions (DM) Kineton. It forms part of the parish of Burton Dassett.
