= Burton Dassett Hills =

Country Park in Warwickshire

Coordinates: 52°09′51.93″N 1°25′17.31″W

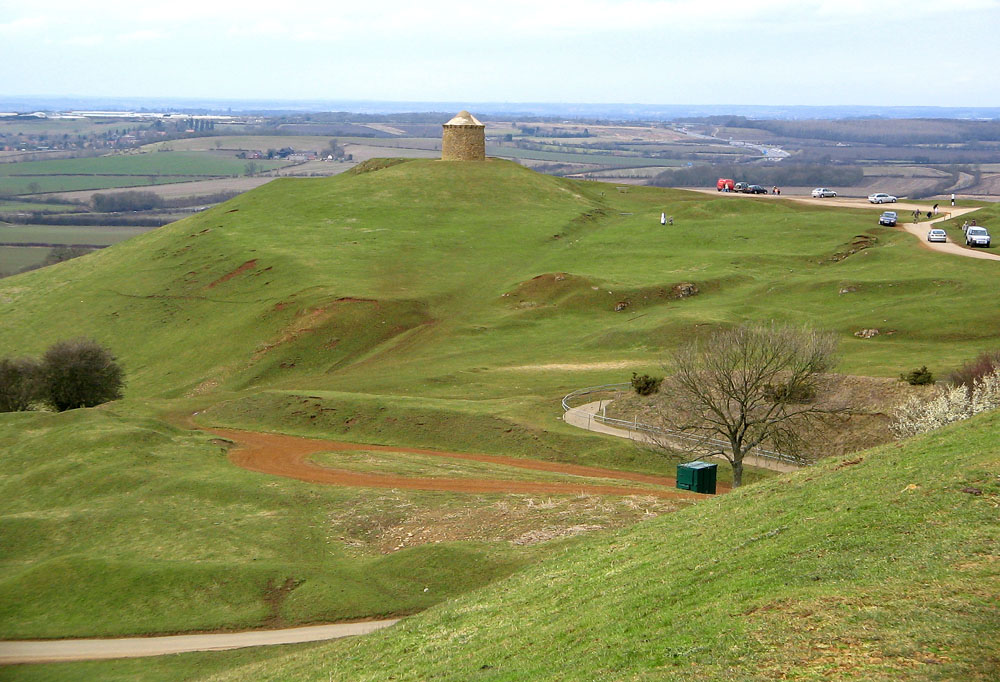
A view of the hills

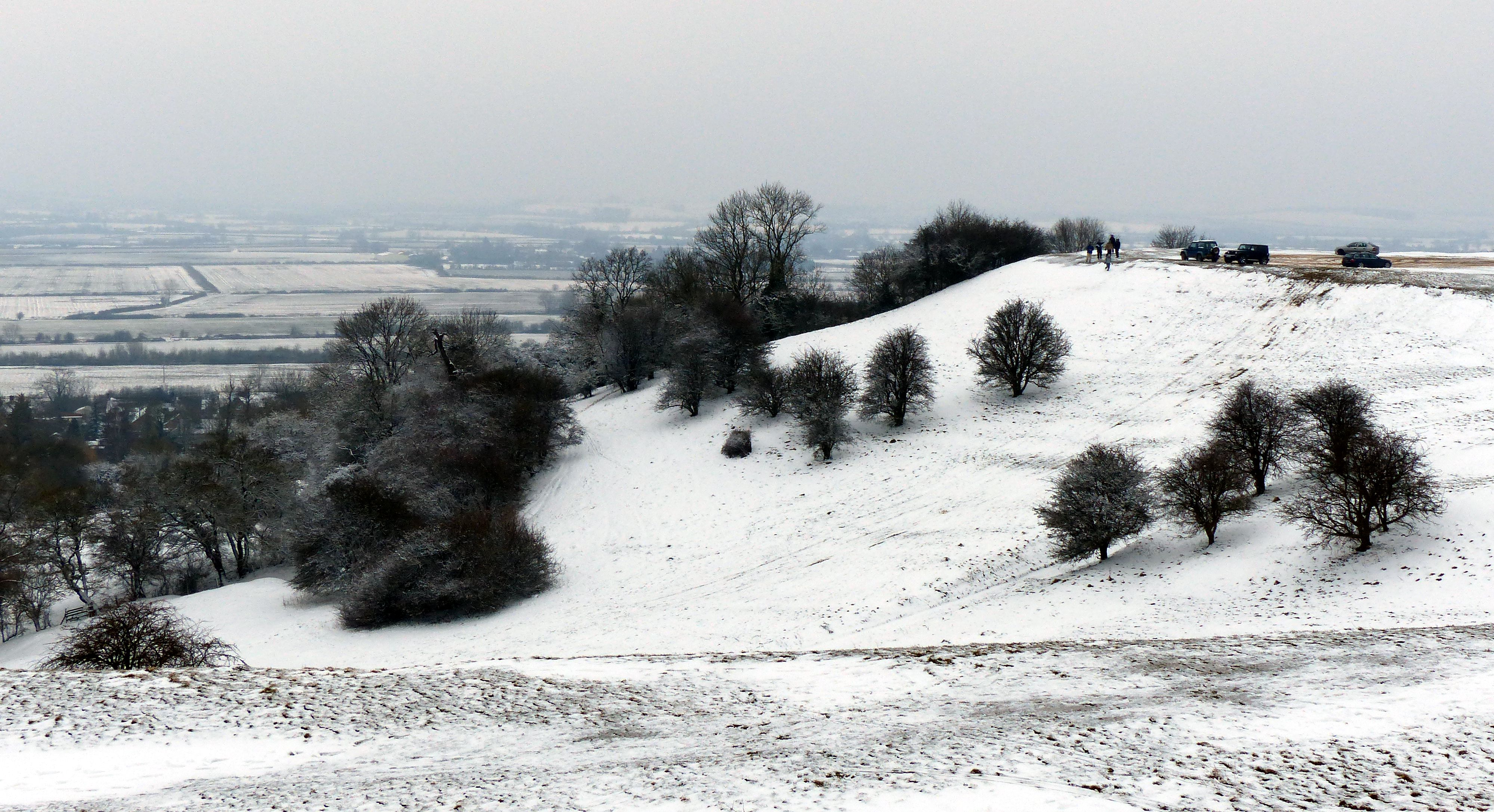
Snow-covered Burton Dassett Hills

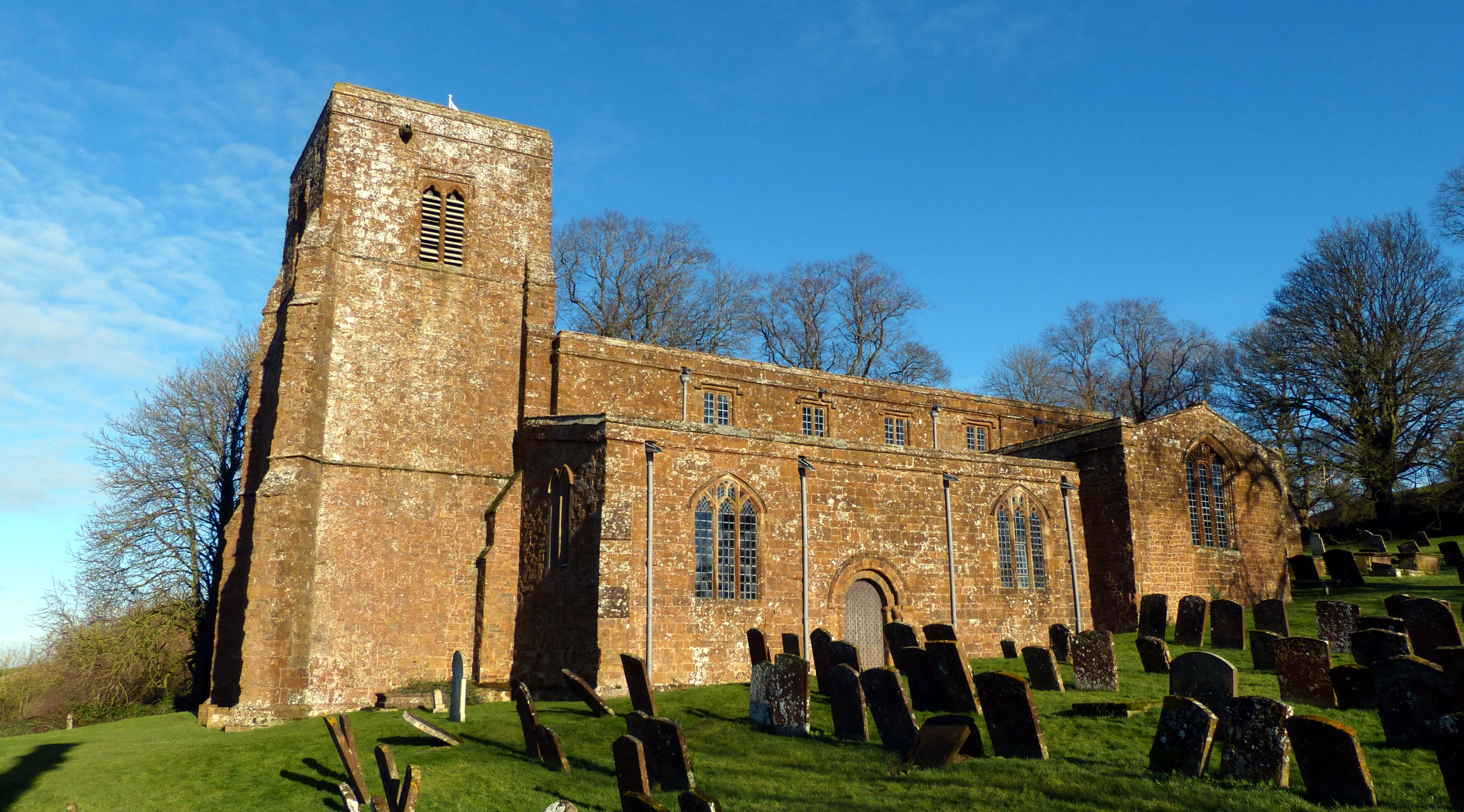
All Saints Church, Burton Dassett

Burton Dassett Hills Country Park is a country park in southeastern Warwickshire, England.

It was created as a country park in 1971 and is run by Warwickshire County Council. The area comprises a group of ironstone hills, which are named after the village of Burton Dassett which is located in the hills. The hills rise to 211 m (692 ft) above sea level and are situated half a mile east of the M40 motorway.

The area was once extensively quarried for ironstone and a short industrial railway – Edge Hill Light Railway – existed for this purpose until the 1920s.

Of interest at the site is a 12th-century parish church at the old village of Burton Dassett. Outside the church is a holy well which still provides water. The park is also popular with flyers of kites and radio-controlled gliders.

Impressive views across the surrounding countryside can be seen from the hills; towns and other features that are viewable are described by a toposcope. On a clear day, places as far afield as Coventry (more than 20 miles away) can be seen. The park and the church were used as a location in the Tom Selleck 1990 film Three Men and a Little Lady.

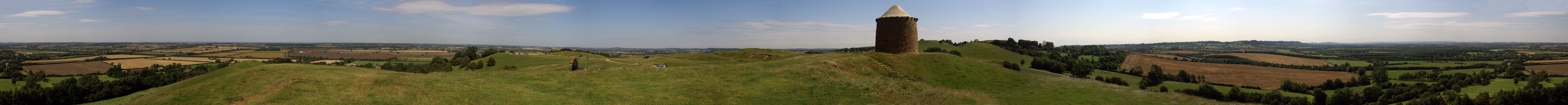
A panorama of Burton Dassett Hills
