= MOD Kineton =

Ministry of Defence property

- DM Kineton / Marlborough Barracks
- Kineton, Warwickshire in England
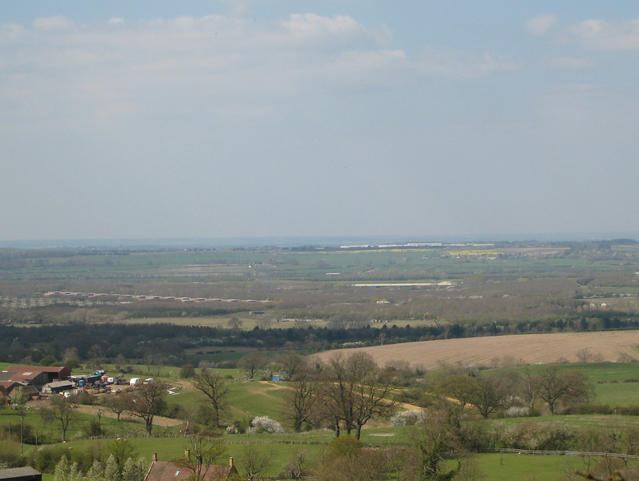
- A distant view of MOD Kineton

Site information
- Type: Ammunition depository
- Owner: Ministry of Defence

Location
- Shown within Warwickshire
- Coordinates: 52.1633°N 1.4439°W

Site history
- Built: 1941
- In use: 1941–present

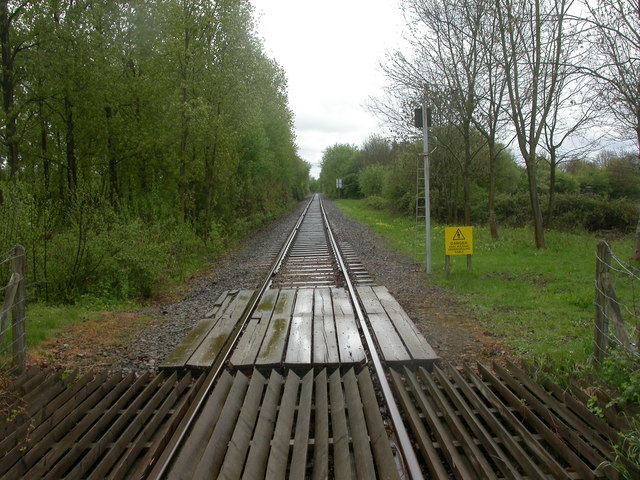
Part of the extensive rail network that exists around MoD Kineton, here a level crossing at Radway

Defence Munitions (DM) Kineton occupies the site officially known as MOD Kineton, and is a Ministry of Defence property located close to the village of Kineton, Warwickshire, England.

The site is also known as Kineton Station and Marlborough Barracks.

== History ==
Developed from 1941 onwards on land neighbouring the village of Burton Dassett, the site is approximately 10 miles (16 km) from both Banbury and Leamington Spa. Developed as a Central Ammunition Depot, it also served during the Second World War as a Royal Pioneer Corps camp.

Defence Munitions Kineton is now the largest ammunition depot in western Europe. The base stores more than 60% of the entire Ministry of Defence’s munitions.

=== Rail links ===
Defence Munitions Kineton extends to 2200 acres. It is linked to the Network Rail mainline system by a branch line consisting of part of the former mainline of the Stratford-upon-Avon and Midland Junction Railway, from Fenny Compton. The building of the M40 motorway cut the line for a time, but after a new bridge was built, the line was rebuilt in its entirety with deep ballast and fully welded joints.

=== Based units ===
The site also houses the Defence Explosive Ordnance Disposal, Munitions and Search Training Regiment, and there is an extensive military family married quarters patch at Temple Herdewyke, along with its associated information centre, Kineton HIVE.
