= Fenny Compton =

Parish Village in Warwickshire, England

Coordinates: 52.167°N 1.39°W

Fenny Compton: Fenny
- Village
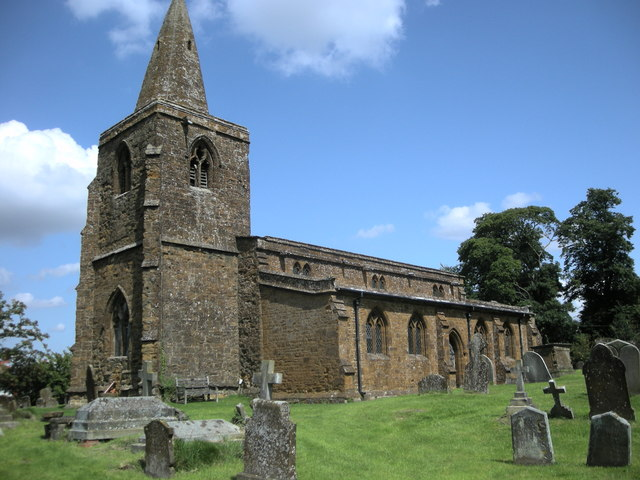
- St Peter's & St Clare's Parish Church

- Location within Warwickshire
- Population: 925 (2021)
- OS grid reference: SP417523
- Civil parish: Fenny Compton
- District: Stratford-on-Avon
- Shire county: Warwickshire
- Region: West Midlands
- Country: England
- Sovereign state: United Kingdom
- Post town: Southam
- Postcode district: CV47
- Police: Warwickshire
- Fire: Warwickshire
- Ambulance: West Midlands
- UK Parliament: Kenilworth and Southam
- Website: https://www.fennycompton-pc.gov.uk

Fenny Compton is a village and parish in Warwickshire, England, eight miles north of Banbury and seven miles south of Southam. After the 2021 census, it had a population of 925. Its name comes from the Anglo-Saxon Fennig Cumbtūn meaning "marshy farmstead in a valley".

== History ==
In 1498, Sir William Cope, who served as Cofferer of the Household of Henry VII from 1494 to 1505 (in the absence at that time of a Treasurer of the Household he carried out the duties of that office as well), was granted the Lordships of Wormleighton and Fenny Compton, part of the lands of Sir Simon Mountford who had been attainted in 1495. He later sold the lands to the Spencer family, later of Althorpe. The Parish church of St Peter and St. Clare was built in the 13th century and is a Grade II* listed building.

=== Rail Services ===
Fenny Compton had two railway stations, Fenny Compton Railway Station on the Great Western Railway route from Oxford to Birmingham Snow Hill, and Fenny Compton West Railway Station on the Stratford-upon-Avon and Midland Junction Railway route from Bicester North to Broom. The GWR station and SMJ station were built alongside each other controlled by a joint signal box. The Fenny Compton Railway Station (Great Western from Birmingham Snow Hill to London Paddington and the London, Midland & Scottish Railway branch line from Stratford-Upon-Avon to Blisworth) closed in 1964, apart from the railway line from Fenny Compton to CAD Kineton.

=== Technological Advancements ===
Fenny Compton was the home of Andrew and Kathleen Booth, computer pioneers in the 1940s who both built a prototype electronic computer called All-Purpose Electronic Computer (APEC). That prototype led directly to the ICT 1200 computer, one of the UK's first mass-produced computer.

=== Weather Events ===
The village was struck by an F0/T1 tornado on 23 November 1981, as part of the record-breaking nationwide tornado outbreak on that day. It caused minor damage to the village, but it did spawn more destructive tornadoes nearby. Fenny Compton has also been part of a record-breaking heatwave in July 2022, with temperatures reaching up to 39 °C.

=== Television ===
The village features in the 2024 TV drama Mr Bates vs The Post Office about the British Post Office scandal, a four-part British television drama series for ITV, as the location for the first meeting of ex sub-postmasters and mistresses in 2009.

== Amenities ==
The village has a primary school, Dassett C of E Primary School, a small Church of England Primary School tucked away next to Memorial Road and the village's High Street. Approximately 100 children attend the school. The school opened as The Dasset C of E Primary School on October 4, 1996, upon the closure of Fenny Compton School, Northend School and Farnborough School and is on the site of the old Fenny Compton School. The three schools were part of an amalgamation to create the new school, and has been open ever since.

Fenny Compton has been home to the Fenny Compton Fire Station, in service since 14 July 1965. It was partially closed on 31 December 2025 and is now only used for extreme circumstances (e.g. extreme weather events, periods of high demand) and only holds one fire truck. Before then, it was used to serve the local area of the area, used for minor and major fire services, rescue missions, extreme weather events (such as the July 2022 heatwave), and more.

The village is also served by Fenny Compton Surgery, a general practice on the High Street. The practice has a branch surgery in Shenington and provides primary healthcare services to patients across the surrounding rural area.

At the heart of the village is The Merrie Lion, a Grade II listed public house on Church Street in the centre of the village. Dating from 1710, the building is constructed of locally quarried Hornton ironstone from the Avon Dassett Quarry and is recognised for its architectural and historic significance. Following financial difficulties, the pub closed in 2010, but was saved after a community-led campaign and underwent extensive refurbishment before reopening in July 2012.

== See also ==
- Banburyshire
- Warwickshire
- Mr Bates vs The Post Office
- Fenny Compton West railway station
- Fenny Compton Railway Station
- Andrew Donald Booth
- Kathleen Hydla Valerie Booth
- International Computers and Tabulators
