= Northend, Warwickshire =

Village in Warwickshire, England

Coordinates: 52.17028°N 1.42825°W

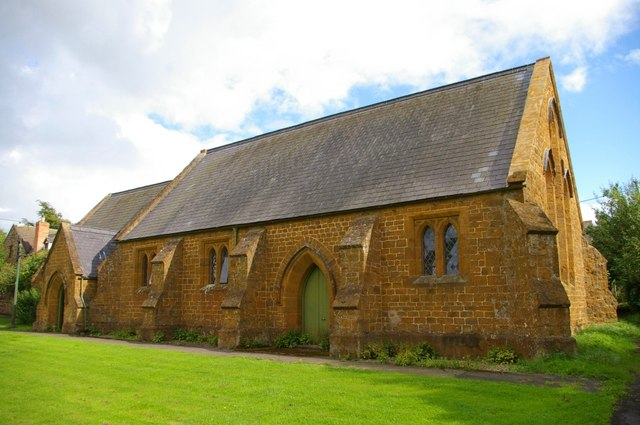
The Chapel of Ease at Northend

The village within Warwickshire

Northend is a village in southern-eastern Warwickshire, England, located roughly halfway between the town of Banbury and the conurbation of Leamington Spa and Warwick. The population taken at the 2011 census can be found under Burton Dassett. Situated at the foot of the Burton Dassett Hills, which contains Burton Dassett Country Park, it is less than a mile east of the M40 motorway. The M40 is about 8 minutes away. There was once a primary school in the village, but this was controversially closed by the LEA due to a claimed lack of pupils, and it has now been converted into a house. There were two churches in the village, a Church of England building, known as the Chapel of Ease, and Northend Methodist Chapel, which has now been converted into a house.
