= Edge Hill Light Railway =

Overview
- Status: Closed
- Locale: Warwickshire
- Termini: Burton Dassett; Edge Hill Quarries
- Stations: None

History
- Opened: 1920
- Closed: 1925

Technical
- Line length: 3.5 mi (5.6 km)
- Track gauge: 4 ft 8 1/2 in (1,435 mm)

The Edge Hill Light Railway was a standard-gauge light railway in Warwickshire, England. It was designed to carry ironstone from Edge Hill Quarries to Burton Dassett, where a junction was made with the Stratford-upon-Avon and Midland Junction Railway. It was never officially opened, but began operating in 1922.

== Route ==
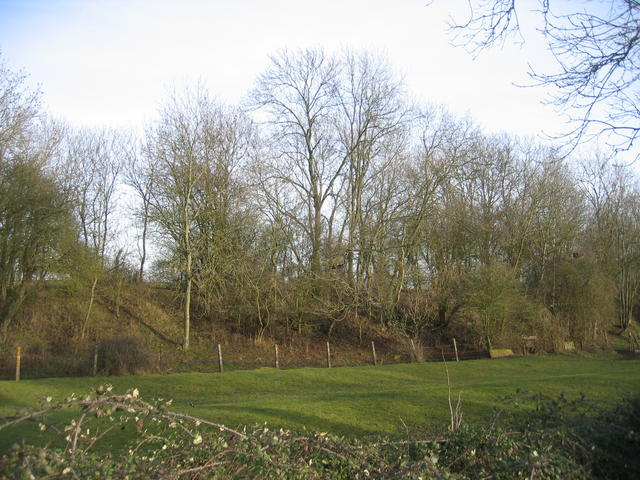
A remaining embankment

The line was 3.5 miles (5.6 km) long in two sections linked by a cable-worked incline with a gradient of 1 in 6 (16%). As the quarry was at the top of the incline, the incline could be worked as self-acting: the weight of full ore wagons descending was sufficient to draw the empties back up.

== History ==
The Stratford-upon-Avon and Midland Junction Railway proposed a branch line to the ironstone quarries at Edge Hill during the First World War, and a subsidiary company, the Edge Hill Light Railway was set up to build it, with Colonel Stephens appointed as the company's engineer. Operations began in 1922 but within three years it was found that the iron ore deposits were uneconomic, and the line ceased operating in 1925. The rails were not dismantled until 1935 and at least one of the locomotives was not cut up until 1946. In 1942, permanent way from the lower portion of the line was requisitioned for the construction of the army depot now known as MoD Kineton. This had the effect of isolating the line, and the remaining stock at the top of the incline, from the main line and so they survived there until 1946.

== Locomotives ==
Name	Number	Builder	Build Date	Notes	References
Deptford	673 (EHLR 1)	LBSCR Class A1X	1872	Scrapped 1946	
Shadwell	674 (EHLR 2)	LBSCR Class A1	1872	Scrapped 1946	
Sankey	1088	Manning Wardle	1888		

== Goods stock ==
Description	Origin	Quantity	Notes
4-wheeled open wagons	Various	?	All scrapped 1947
Brake vans	GER	2	All scrapped 1947
