= Stratford Old Town railway station =

Former railway station in Warwickshire, England

Coordinates: 52.1843°N 1.7108°W

Stratford Old Town
- The station in 1950.

General information
- Location: Stratford-upon-Avon, Stratford-on-Avon; England
- Grid reference: SP199540
- Platforms: 2

Other information
- Status: Disused

History
- Pre-grouping: Stratford-upon-Avon and Midland Junction Railway
- Post-grouping: London, Midland and Scottish Railway; Western Region of British Railways

Key dates
- 1 July 1873: Station opens
- 23 July 1877: closed
- 2 June 1879: reopened
- 7 April 1952: Station closes to passengers
- 1965: Station closes to freight
Location

Stratford Old Town railway station was a railway station that served the town of Stratford-upon-Avon in Warwickshire, England. On the Stratford-upon-Avon and Midland Junction Railway, the station was built in 1873, adjacent to the Old Town district, south of the town centre.

== History ==
Opened on 1 July 1873, along with the other stations on the line, the station lasted less than a century: the station closed to passengers on 7 April 1952, although there was one train carrying the Queen Mother to Stratford in 1964. The line remained open for freight until 1965.

== Remains ==
The A4390 bypass road was built over the route of the railway since closure. However one platform of the old station was retained and is still visible by the roadside.

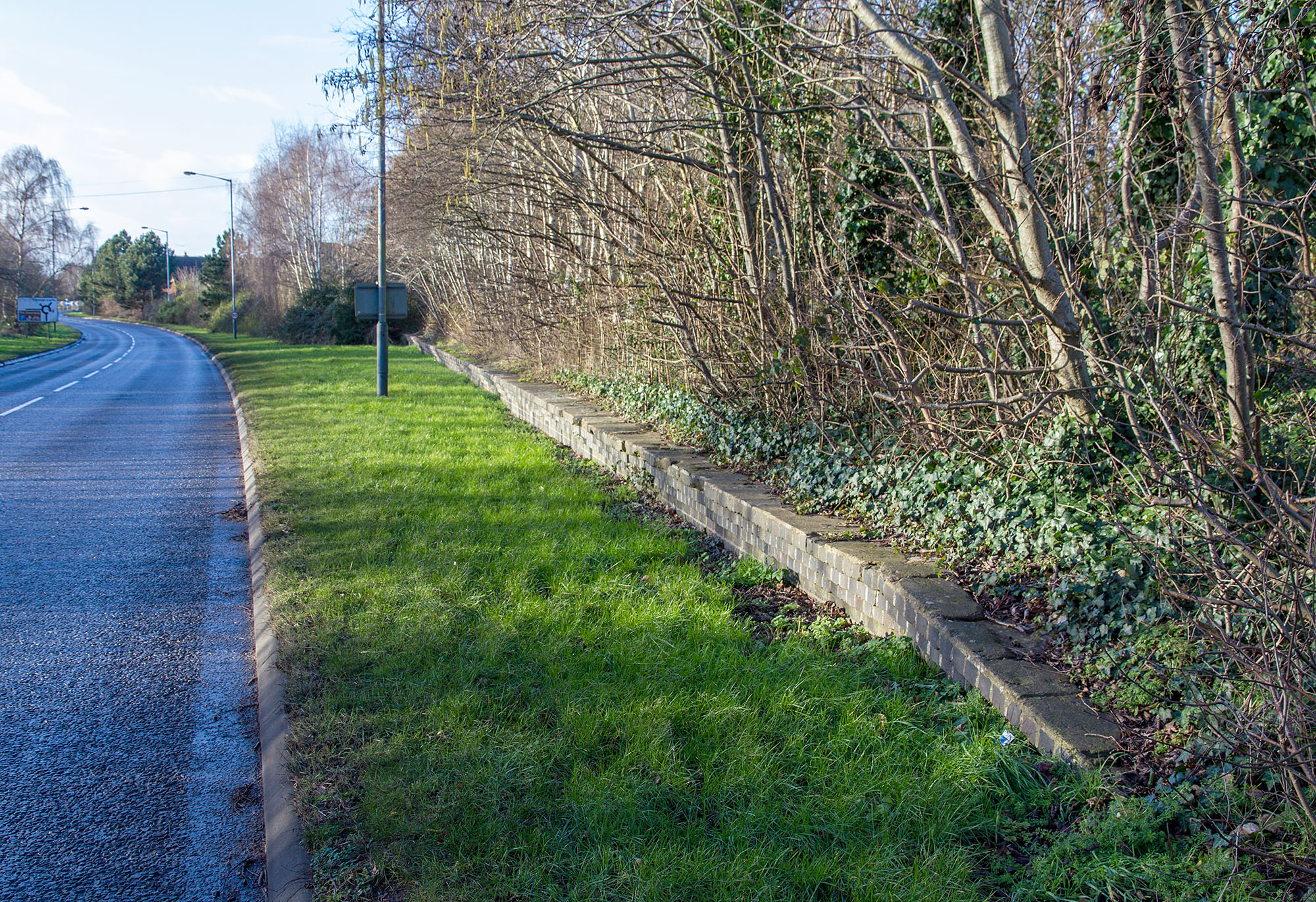
Remaining platform

== Routes ==
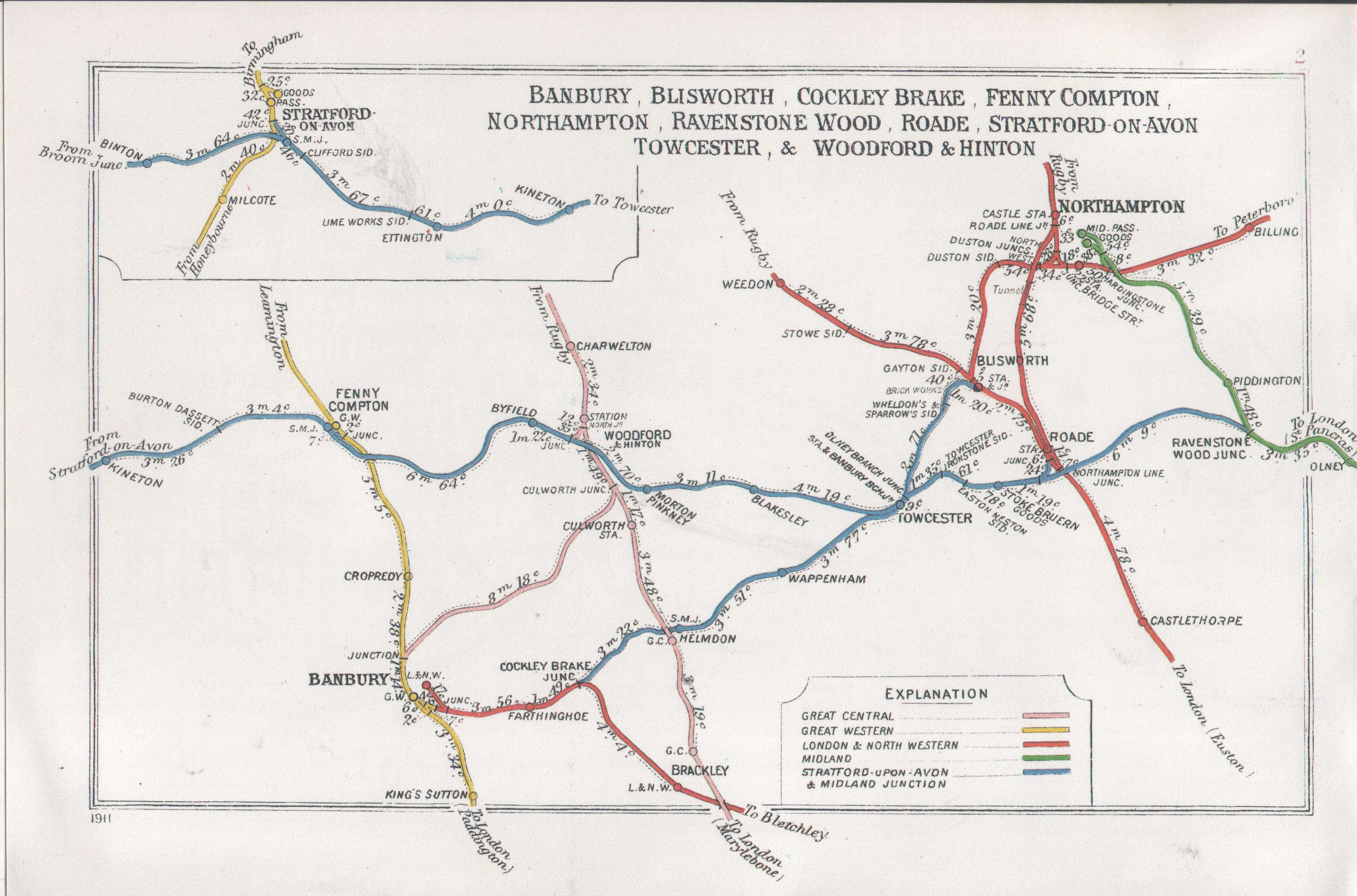
A 1911 Railway Clearing House map of railways in the vicinity of Stratford-upon-Avon (top left inset; Stratford Old Town is in blue labelled "S.M.J.")

Preceding station	Disused railways	Following station
Stratford-upon-Avon	SMJR; East and West Junction Railway	Ettington
Binton	SMJR; Evesham, Redditch and Stratford-upon-Avon Junction Railway	Ettington
