= Fenny Compton railway station =

Former railway station in England

Coordinates: 52.1729°N 1.3770°W

Fenny Compton

General information
- Location: Fenny Compton, Stratford-on-Avon, Warwickshire; England
- Grid reference: SP427529
- Platforms: 2

Other information
- Status: Disused

History
- Original company: Oxford and Rugby Railway
- Pre-grouping: Great Western Railway
- Post-grouping: Great Western Railway

Key dates
- 1 October 1852: Station opens
- 2 November 1964: Station closes
Location

Fenny Compton railway station was a railway station serving Fenny Compton in Warwickshire, England.

== History ==
The Great Western Railway (GWR) opened the station in 1852 on its Oxford and Rugby Railway (ORR). It would have formed the junction with its proposed Birmingham and Oxford Junction Railway. In 1871 the East and West Junction Railway opened its own Fenny Compton West station immediately next to it on its line between Stratford-upon-Avon and Towcester.

Parliament passed the Oxford and Rugby Railway Act 1845 (8 & 9 Vict. c. clxxxviii), and a single track broad gauge line was opened in 1850 between Oxford and Banbury. Approval had also been given in the Birmingham and Oxford Junction Railway Act 1846 (9 & 10 Vict. c. cccxxxvii) for the Birmingham and Oxford Junction Railway. The two lines would meet 2 miles (3 km) north of Fenny Compton, near Knightcote, and at Oxford the ORR would connect with the GWR line from London Paddington. Parliament considered that the lines would provide useful competition for the London and Birmingham Railway which had become part of the London and North Western Railway. It gave approval subject to the lines being bought and operated by the GWR.

To discourage the GWR from proceeding, the LNWR approached the shareholders of the Oxford and Birmingham Railway Company individually to buy their shares with view to forcing the price as high as possible - resulting in questions being asked in Parliament.

However, while the Regulating the Gauge of Railways Act 1846 required that all new railways should be built to standard gauge, the GWR had been given a number of dispensations to continue with its broad gauge, including its lines from Oxford. The question arose of where the break-of-gauge should be – Oxford or Rugby – a dilemma the LNWR doubtless exploited. If the latter it would mean the GWR having a section of standard gauge line, including part of its Birmingham line. As a result, in August 1849 the section of the Rugby line north of Fenny Compton was abandoned. Then in 1848 Parliament ordered that the Oxford to Birmingham line be relaid to mixed gauge. By 1889 it was finally laid to standard gauge.

British Railways closed Fenny Compton station to passenger traffic from 2 November 1964. The GWR line remains as the present day Didcot to Chester line. A stub of the Stratford-upon-Avon line remains as a freight line leading to the MoD Kineton Military Railway. The station trackwork remains much as it was, but the platforms and most of the buildings have gone. Going north from Fenny Compton toward Leamington Spa the line curves gently to the right, on the course that would have taken it to Rugby via Southam. After about 2 miles (3 km) the line starts to curve to the left, and at this point (grid reference SP408562), earthworks for the abandoned Rugby line are still visible curving away to the right.

== Routes ==
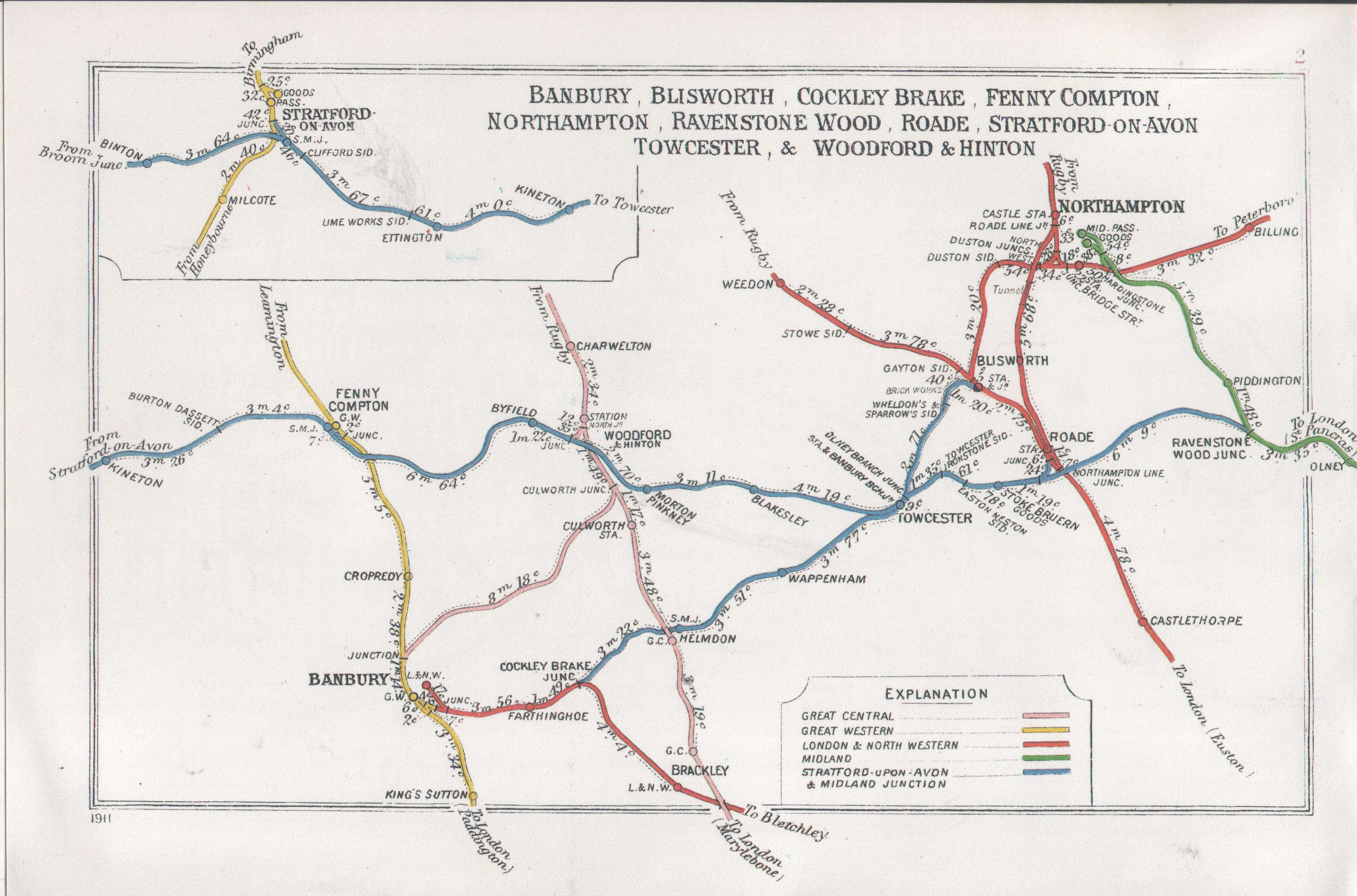
A 1911 Railway Clearing House map of railways in and around Fenny Compton (left, in yellow labelled "G.W.")

Preceding station	Historical railways	Following station
Cropredy; Line open, station closed	Great Western Railway; Chiltern Main Line	Southam Road and Harbury; Line open, station closed
