= Fenny Compton West railway station =

Former railway station in Warwickshire, England

Coordinates: 52.1729°N 1.3770°W

Fenny Compton West

General information
- Location: Fenny Compton, District of Stratford-on-Avon; England
- Platforms: 2

Other information
- Status: Disused

History
- Original company: East and West Junction Railway
- Pre-grouping: SuA&MJR
- Post-grouping: London, Midland and Scottish Railway; Western Region of British Railways

Key dates
- 1 June 1871: Station opens
- 1 August 1877: Station closes
- 22 February 1885: Station reopens
- 7 April 1952: Station closes
Location

Fenny Compton West railway station was a railway station serving Fenny Compton in the English county of Warwickshire.

== History ==
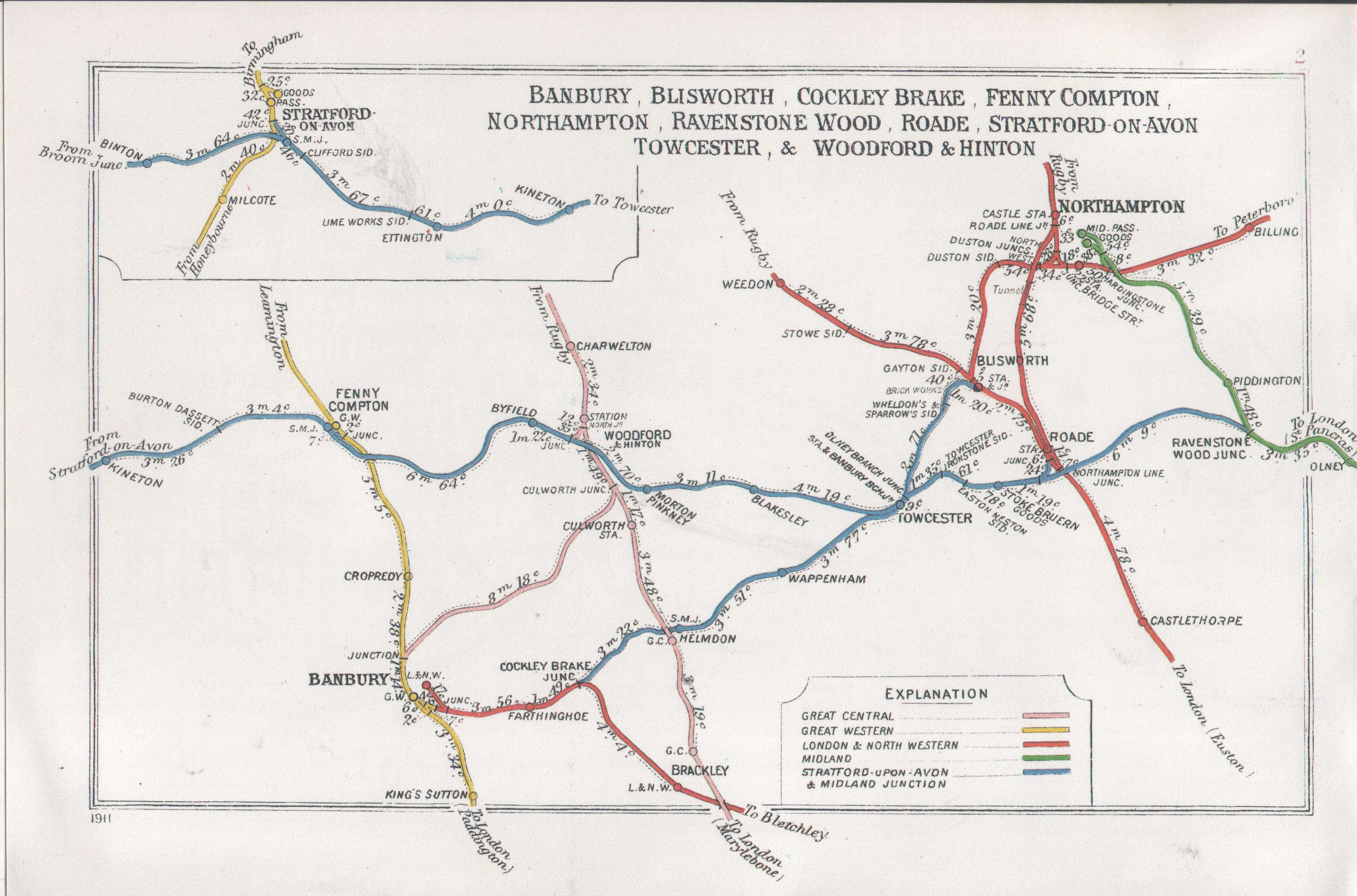
A 1911 Railway Clearing House map showing Fenny Compton (left) and the SMJR (in blue).

It was opened by East and West Junction Railway between Stratford upon Avon and Towcester. The first section of the line to open was the Fenny Compton to Kineton section on 1 June 1871 followed by the Kineton to Stratford upon Avon section on 1 July 1873.

There were two platforms to serve the passing loop on the otherwise single line. It was built side by side with the GWR's Fenny Compton station on the Birmingham & Oxford Junction Railway which had opened in 1852. The up platform was directly next to the GWR down, but because the latter's goods yard was in between, the E&W one tapered down to less than 3 feet instead of the required six - something which the Board of Trade inspector ordered should be rectified but which was never done.

In fact the Board of Trade had been extremely critical of the impecunious line. On the first visit of its inspector for, it had commented on deficient ballast, missing fish bolts, incomplete points interlocking, as well as poor fencing and lack of station facilities, such as name boards and clocks

The line became part of the Stratford-upon-Avon and Midland Junction Railway in a merger of 1908 and at grouping in 1923 it became part of the London Midland and Scottish Railway.

The LMS found it a useful link between its Bristol and London routes in competition with GWR goods traffic to the Capital.

Initially the line had its own signal box, but in 1931 a new joint LMS and GWR box was built to the north of the station. This in turn was replaced by British Rail in 1960.

Passenger services finished on the E&W in 1952. Subsequently, the up platform was removed, and various connecting lines were installed to allow through goods traffic. However this never materialised because the line was closed as a through route in 1965. A stub of the Stratford upon Avon line remains as a freight line leading to the Kineton Military Railway. The GWR line remains as the present day Didcot to Birmingham line. Although the station trackwork remains much as it was, the platforms and most of the buildings have gone.

== Routes ==
Preceding station	Disused railways	Following station
North End	SMJR; East and West Junction Railway	Byfield
