= Burton Dassett =

Parish and shrunken medieval village in England

Coordinates: 52.162°N 1.419°W

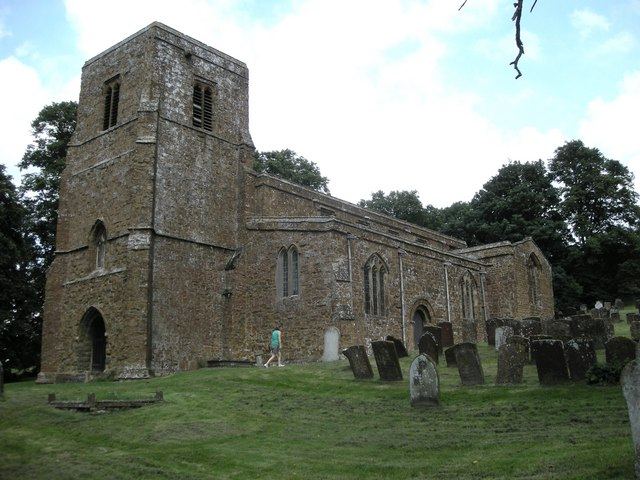
The parish church

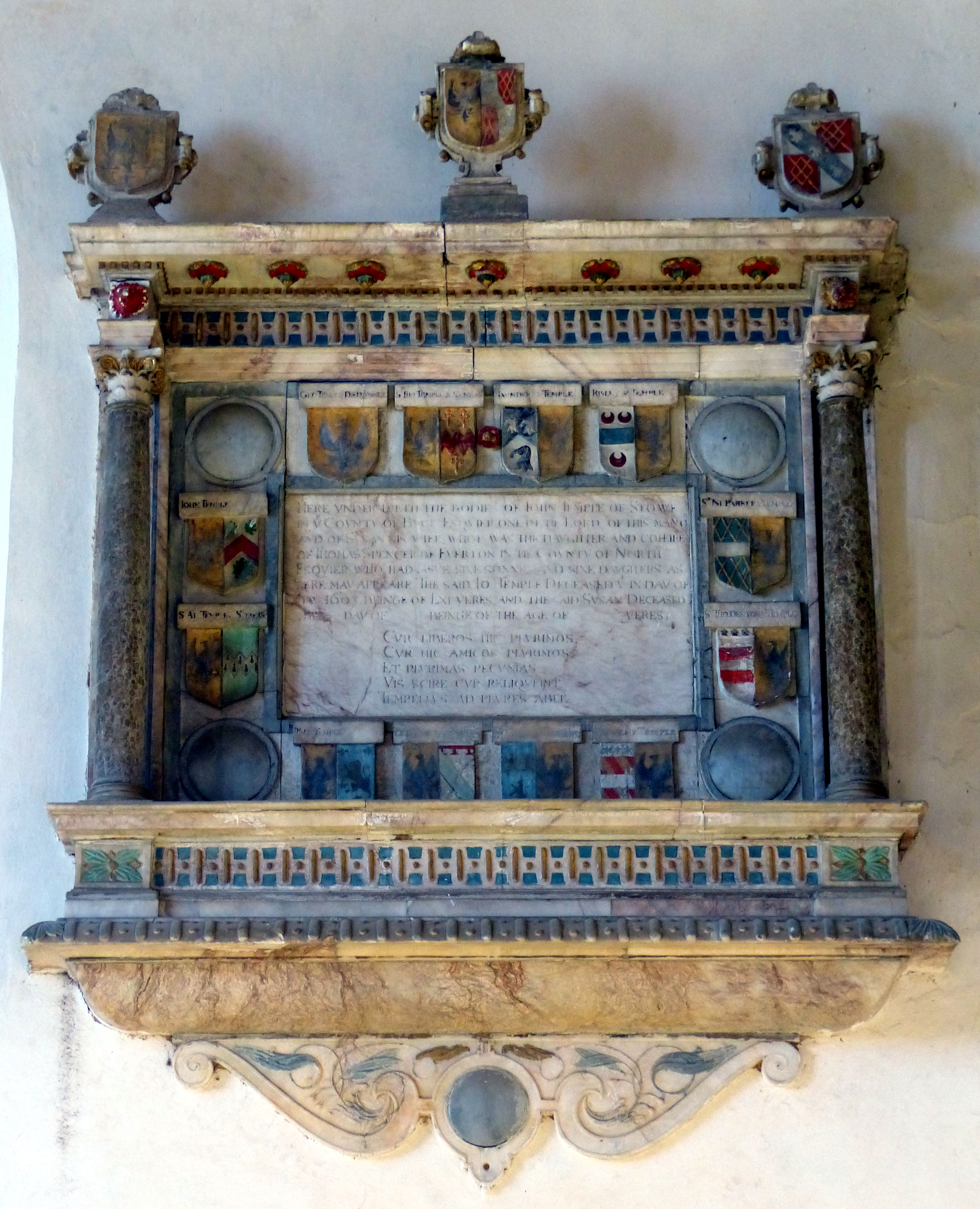
The memorial to John Temple and his children in Burton Dassett church

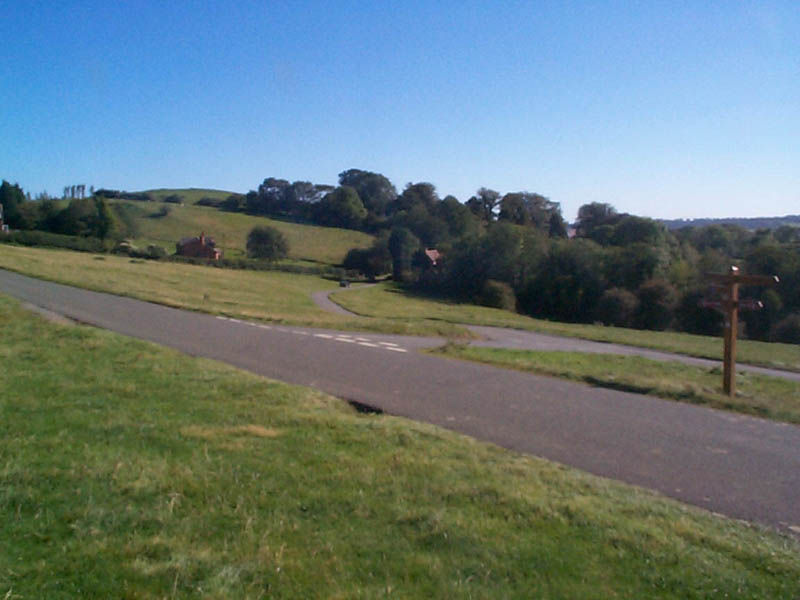
Looking towards the parish church

Burton Dassett is a parish and shrunken medieval village in the Stratford-upon-Avon district of Warwickshire, England. The population (including the village of Knightcote) of the civil parish at the 2011 census was 1,322. Much of the area is now in the Burton Dassett Hills country park. It was enclosed for sheep farming by Sir Edward Belknap and John Heritage at the end of the 15th century. It was the home of Sir Thomas Temple as a child, and for several generations was regarded by the Temple family of Stowe Buckinghamshire as their ancestral home. There is a heraldic memorial to John Temple and his children in Burton Dassett church. Each of the twelve shields represents one of John Temple's children. The left half of each shield represents the husband and the right half represents the wife. The twelfth (undivided) shield represents Temple's son George who died young and therefore did not marry. Susannah Smith, the wife of agriculturalist Jethro Tull was born in the village. Previously known as Chipping Dassett due to its relatively large and successful market.
