= Radstone =

Hamlet in Northamptonshire, England

Coordinates: 52.0598°N 1.1482°W

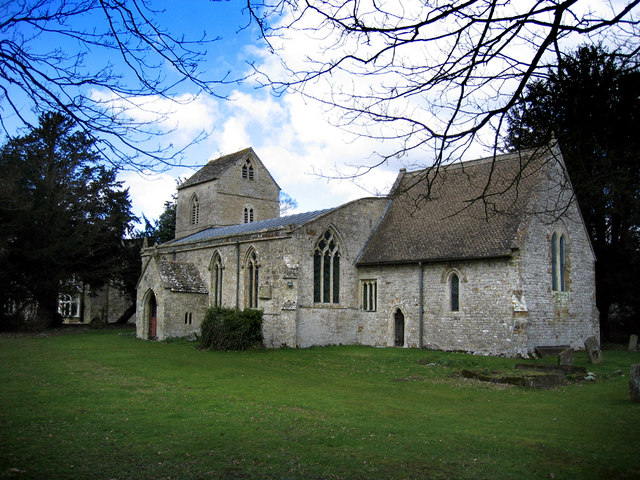
- St Lawrence's parish church

- Location within Northamptonshire
- Population: 54 (2001 Census)
- OS grid reference: SP5840
- Civil parish: Radstone
- Unitary authority: West Northamptonshire
- Ceremonial county: Northamptonshire
- Region: East Midlands
- Country: England
- Sovereign state: United Kingdom
- Post town: Brackley
- Postcode district: NN13
- Dialling code: 01280
- Police: Northamptonshire
- Fire: Northamptonshire
- Ambulance: East Midlands
- UK Parliament: Daventry
- Website: Radstone Parish Meeting

Radstone is a hamlet and civil parish in West Northamptonshire, about 2 miles (3 km) north of Brackley. The 2001 Census recorded a parish population of 54. At the 2011 Census the population of the hamlet remained less than 100 and was included in the civil parish of Whitfield.

== Geography ==
The land of the parish mostly falls from west to east from a hill whose highest point, about 520 feet (160 m) above sea level, is in Greatworth parish just beyond the field boundaries that form the western boundary of Radstone parish.

A stream forms much of the northern boundary or Radstone parish, flowing east to join the Great Ouse. Another tributary of the same river forms part of the parish's southern boundary. A third flows west–east across the parish and joins the first about 3/4-mile (1.2 km) east of Radstone hamlet. The parish is open farmland apart from Shortgrove Wood, which is in the northeast part next to the boundaries with Helmdon and Syresham.

The present hamlet of Radstone is a shrunken village, formerly called Upper or Over Radstone. There was a Lower or Nether Radstone about 4/5-mile (1.3 km) to the east, just downstream of the confluence of the two streams. It is now a deserted village.

== Roman archaeology ==
Before 1900 an urn containing coins, presumably Roman, was found in the parish and placed in Northampton Museum. By the 1980s it had been lost.

== Toponym ==
The Domesday Book of 1086 records the toponym as Rodestone. Pipe rolls record it as Rodestona in 1163, Rodestūn in 1167 and Rudston in 1198. A Curia regis roll from 1201 records it as Rodestan. The name comes from the Old English words rōde meaning "cross" (see "Rood") and stān meaning "stone".

== Manor ==
In the Norman era the manor was assessed at two hides. The Domesday Book of 1086 records Robert of Rhuddlan holding it; in the 12th century it was in the fee of Chester. In 1260 cultivation covered 22 virgates of land at Upper Radstone and 2 1/2 virgates at Lower Radstone.

== Parish church ==
The earliest parts of the Church of England parish church of Saint Lawrence are 12th-century. The Baptismal font is Norman. The gable-roofed west tower has characteristic Norman features including a round-headed arch to the nave. The chancel is Early English Gothic of the early 13th century, with single lancet windows in the north and south walls and a double lancet window to the east.

The west tower has two sets of bell-openings. The first set is early 13th-century and is now blocked; the second set is Decorated Gothic. Also Decorated Gothic are the north and south aisles added to the nave early in the 14th century, each with two- and three-light windows with reticulated tracery and a three-bay arcade with octagonal piers. Near the east end of the south aisle is a cusped and ogeed piscina for a side altar that would have been there before the Reformation. In the chancel is a monument to a John Blencow, who died in 1666. The church is a Grade I listed building.

St Lawrence's is now part of the parish of Helmdon with Stuchbury and Radstone, which in turn is part of the Benefice of the Astwell Group of Parishes.

St Lawrence's church has been closed for worship since June 2015 because Natterer's and other bats use it as a seasonal summer roost. The Astwell Benefice calls the colony an "infestation" and is seeking a National Lottery Heritage Fund grant to have the bats permanently "excluded" from the building.

== Economic and social history ==
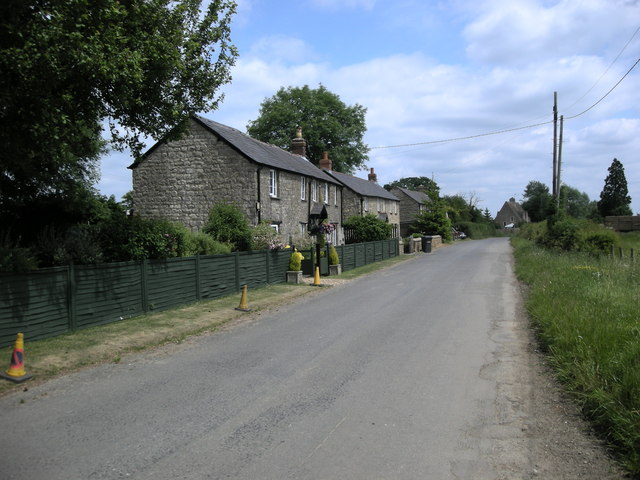
Cottages in Radstone

Faint earthworks show the sites of former cottages in (Upper) Radstone: at the west end of the hamlet (now almost erased by ploughing), and on the southwest side of the main street opposite the former parish school and houses 15–20.

The remains of Lower Radstone are about 1/4-mile (400 m) northeast of Coldharbour Farm. Earthworks show a north–south main street with an east–west one branching off it to the west, and stonework almost 1 foot (0.3 m) high from former buildings. Medieval pottery ranging from the 12th to the 15th century has been found. At the southeast corner of the former village is a fish pond that cuts through the closes of some of the former cottage sites, and may have been created after the village was abandoned. Lower Radstone was abandoned some time between the 15th and 18th centuries: in the latter it was recorded that "the footsteps of the old demolished town are still remaining".

In the southeast of the parish by Fox Covert is a low mound, about 72 feet (22 m) across and 2 1/2 feet (0.8 m) high, with an indication of a pit or post-hole at its centre. This indicates that the mound was created as the base for a medieval post mill. 12th- to 13th-century pottery has been found at the site.

The parish has some ridge and furrow traces of cultivation, many of them in the reversed S-shape characteristic of ox-ploughing. However, much of the parish is still arable and as a result much of the ridge-and-furrow has been degraded and is now detectable only by aerial archaeology. It is not clear whether Radstone had separate open field systems for each of its two villages or one for the whole parish. Nor is there a surviving record of when the common lands were enclosed.

In 1720 the parish was estimated to have a population of about 100. The 1801 Census counted 128 inhabitants.

=== Railway ===
In the late 1890s the Great Central Main Line from Manchester and Sheffield to London Marylebone was built through the parish, passing just east of the hamlet. It opened in March 1899 with Radstone equidistant between its two nearest stations at Helmdon and Brackley Central. British Railways closed Helmdon station in 1963 and closed the railway and Brackley Central station in 1966.
