= Astwell =

Hamlet in Northamptonshire, England

Coordinates: 52.0916°N 1.1141°W

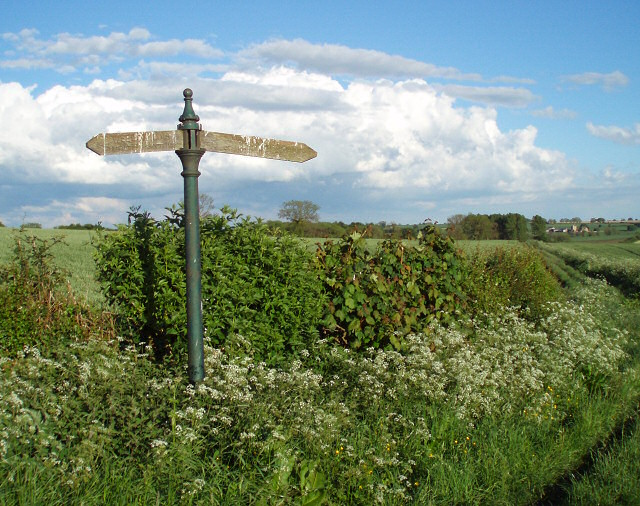
- Signpost commemorating the Astwell mill, 1935–1995

- Location within Northamptonshire
- Civil parish: Helmdon
- Unitary authority: West Northamptonshire
- Ceremonial county: Northamptonshire
- Region: East Midlands
- Country: England
- Sovereign state: United Kingdom
- Post town: Brackley
- Postcode district: NN13
- Police: Northamptonshire
- Fire: Northamptonshire
- Ambulance: East Midlands
- UK Parliament: Daventry

Astwell is a hamlet in Northamptonshire, England. With Falcutt, it is part of the civil parish of Helmdon, but formerly Astwell was split between the parishes of Syresham and Wappenham. The hamlet is 6 miles (10 km) northeast of Brackley and 17 1/2 miles (28 km) by road southwest of the county town of Northampton. Today the hamlet contains little more than the Astwell Castle and a mill.

== History ==
The hamlet's name means 'eastern spring/stream'.

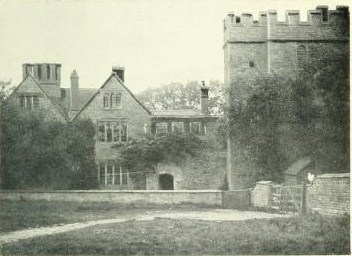
Astwell Castle in 1913

The De Wauncys were amongst the earliest holders of the Astwell manor since the Norman conquest of England. A Robert de Wauncy, who witnessed Magna Carta, is documented as holding the manors of Astwell and Fancote (Falcutt) in the reigns of Henry III and Edward I. In 1453, a John Thorn of Brackley is recorded as being a witness to a grant of land in Astwell, Northamptonshire, The manor maintained close links to nearby Syresham. when the son of Arthur Brooke made an exchange, to Thomas Lovett II (d. 1492), the first of the Lovett family, who held it for the next hundred years.

The building of Astwell Castle is attributed to Thomas Lovett II. His grandson, George Shirley, lived here; and from his great-grandson, Robert Shirley, 1st Earl Ferrers, the manor descended to Washington Shirley, 5th Earl Ferrers (1722–78). The Astwell fields were enclosed in 1761, and two years later, the manor was sold to Richard Grenville-Temple, 2nd Earl Temple (1711–1779). He was succeeded by his nephew, George Nugent-Temple-Grenville, 1st Marquess of Buckingham (1753–1813), and his son, Richard Temple-Nugent-Brydges-Chandos-Grenville, 1st Duke of Buckingham and Chandos (1776–1839) was also associated with Astwell. In 1841, there were 6 houses and 46 inhabitants at Astwell. Richard Temple-Nugent-Brydges-Chandos-Grenville, 2nd Duke of Buckingham and Chandos (1797–1861) sold Astwell in 1850 to the Earl of Southampton, who sold it 12 years later to Lord Penrhyn (1800–86). In 1871, there were only 5 houses and 37 inhabitants, and, according to the Imperial Gazetteer of England and Wales of 1870–72 by John Marius Wilson, the hamlet had become a sportsmen's resort.

On 30 November 1943 a B-17 Flying Fortress bomber, No. 42–3048 from USAAF station 109 Podington of the 327th bomb squadron, 92nd bomb group, 8th bomber command crashed near the castle farm buildings. It had taken off on its way with the rest of the squadron on a mission to bomb the industrial complex at Solingen, Germany. All 10 crew members died in the crash. On 9 November 2008, Lt Col Terry Hayes, Deputy Commander of the USAF 422nd Air Base Group at RAF Croughton laid a special wreath and read out the names of the US airmen. The men were included in the 2008 Remembrance Service at Helmdon parish church.

== Geography ==
Astwell is in southwest Northamptonshire. It is on a tributary of the River Tove, 6 miles (10 km) northeast of Brackley, and about 1 mile (1.6 km) south of Wappenham. By road, Astwell is 12 miles (19 km) northeast of Banbury and 17 miles (27 km) southwest of Northampton. It covers about 1,760 acres (710 ha). Astwell Mill is in the northern part of the hamlet on the Helmdon–Wappenham road, 450 metres (490 yards) north of the castle, along the road west of Astwell Spinney and fish ponds.

== Notable people ==
- Thomas Lovett III (1473–1542), son and heir of Thomas Lovett II, born here, and became High Sheriff of Northamptonshire and King's Escheator. He married Elizabeth Boteler.
- Selina Hastings, Countess of Huntingdon (1707–1791), born here, was patroness of the Calvinistic "Countess of Huntingdon's Connexion".
