= Whitfield, Northamptonshire =

Village in Northamptonshire, England

Coordinates: 52.0506°N 1.1192°W

Whitfield
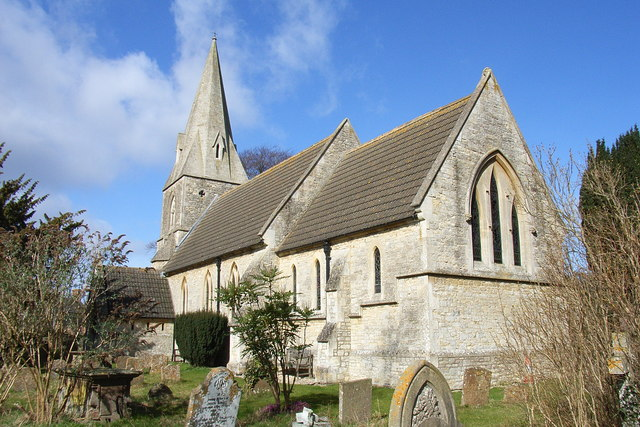
- St John the Evangelist's Church in Whitfield

- Location within Northamptonshire
- Population: 274 (2011)
- OS grid reference: SP6039
- Unitary authority: West Northamptonshire
- Ceremonial county: Northamptonshire
- Region: East Midlands
- Country: England
- Sovereign state: United Kingdom
- Post town: Brackley
- Postcode district: NN13
- Dialling code: 01280
- Police: Northamptonshire
- Fire: Northamptonshire
- Ambulance: East Midlands
- UK Parliament: South Northamptonshire

Whitfield is a village and parish in the south-west of the English county of Northamptonshire in the valley of the River Great Ouse which forms the border with Buckinghamshire. Nearby villages include Syresham, Biddlesden, Helmdon and Silverstone. At the time of the 2001 census, the parish had 215 inhabitants, including Radstone and increasing to 274 at the 2011 Census.

The Church of England parish church is dedicated to St John the Evangelist and is a Grade II listed building, built in 1870. The original church, built in the 13th century, was damaged by a heavy gale on 1 February 1869, which blew down the west tower, which required it to be rebuilt entirely.

== History ==
The village's name means 'open land which is white'.

Whitfield was a Saxon parish, that was owned by the King at the time of the Domesday Book, in 1086, as part of his manor of Kings Sutton. It had a population of 34.

In medieval times, the parish consisted of a single manor, which belonged to Worcester College, Oxford, who were also the patron of the church.

The population of the parish peaked in 328 in 1831, before dropping to a low of 133 in 1951, recovering to 274 at the last census.
