= Helmdon Village railway station =

Former railway station in Northamptonshire, England

Coordinates: 52.0899°N 1.1428°W

Helmdon Village
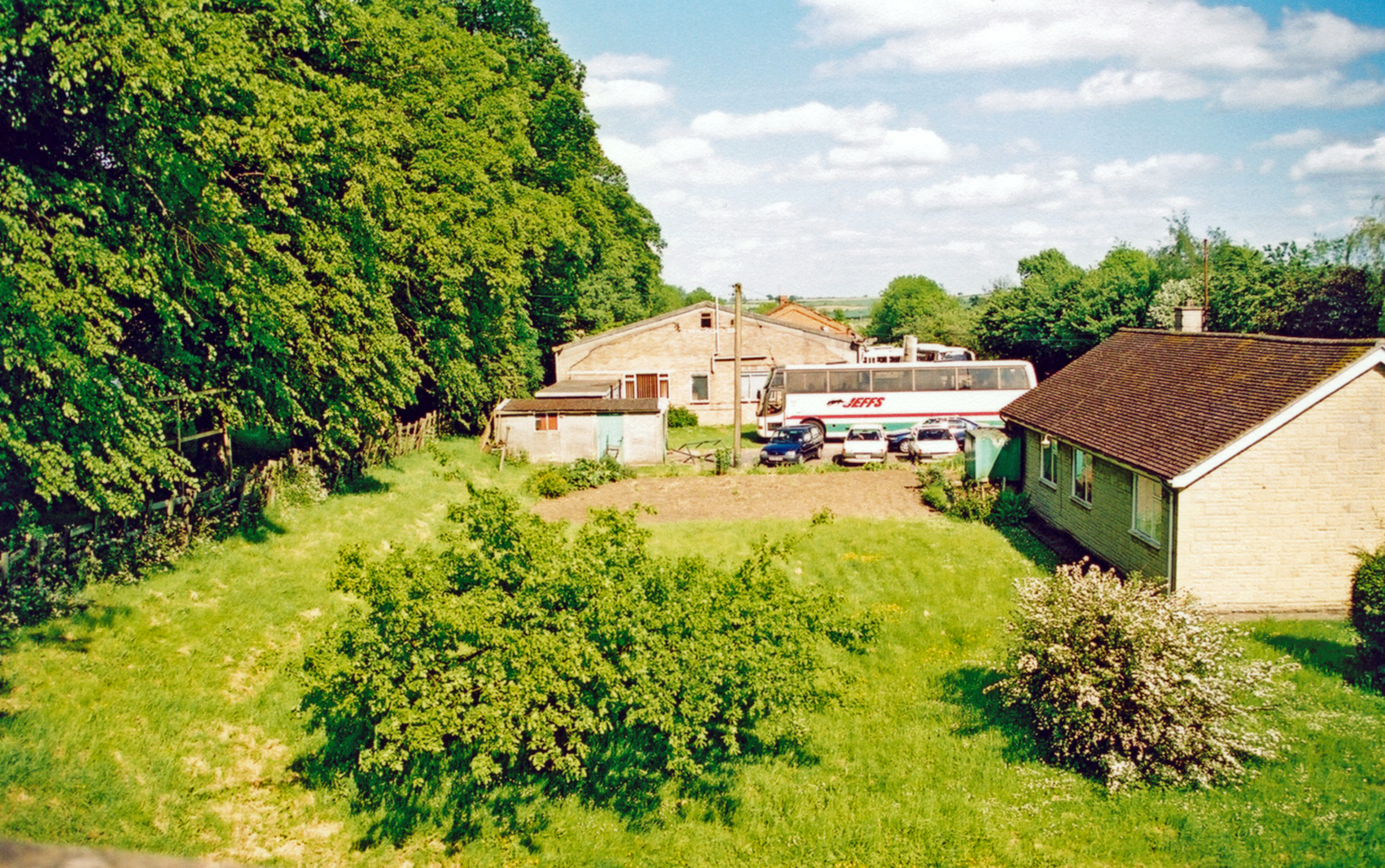
- The site of the station in 2001

General information
- Location: Helmdon, West Northamptonshire; England
- Grid reference: SP588438
- Platforms: 2

Other information
- Status: Disused

History
- Original company: Northampton and Banbury Junction Railway
- Pre-grouping: Stratford-upon-Avon and Midland Junction Railway
- Post-grouping: London, Midland and Scottish Railway; London Midland Region of British Railways

Key dates
- 1 June 1872: Opened as Helmdon
- 1 July 1950: Renamed Helmdon Village
- 2 July 1951: Closed to passengers
- 29 October 1951: Goods facilities withdrawn
Location

Helmdon Village railway station on the Stratford-upon-Avon and Midland Junction Railway (SMJ) served the Northamptonshire village of Helmdon between 1872 and 1951. It was one of two stations serving the lightly populated rural area, the other being Helmdon railway station on the Great Central Main Line, and its closure marked the beginning of the years of decline for the SMJ line.

== History ==
In August 1871 the Northampton and Banbury Junction Railway (N&BJ) extended its line from Towcester to Helmdon. A station was erected in a shallow cutting spanned at its western end by a twin-arched road bridge carrying the village street (now known as Station Road) across the line. The station building and track layout was similar in style to that at neighbouring Wappenham: a one-storey symmetrical red brick building and a single loop siding on the Wappenham side, 100 yards (91 m) from the station, linked to the main line. Unlike Wappenham, Helmdon had a small red brick gabled goods shed which spanned the siding and contained a goods office and internal loading platform.

The station had two platforms enclosing a passing loop, but only one of these was used for regular passenger services. The other was used on race days. The loop was taken out of service with the amalgamation of the N&BJ with the Stratford-upon-Avon and Midland Junction Railway in 1910; Towcester to Cockley Brake junction became one section.

Helmdon was busiest from 1894 until 1898, when the contractor building the section of the Great Central Main Line between Woodford Halse and Brackley Central used it as a railhead to bring materials to build the nine-arch viaduct spanning the valley and carry the new line over the N&BJ's line. A temporary line was laid from Helmdon station to a construction yard with several sidings at the viaduct's planned site. The opening of the Great Central station at Helmdon created potential for confusion until 1928, when the GCR's successor the London and North Eastern Railway renamed it "Helmdon for Sulgrave". The SMJR station was closer to Helmdon village, so in 1950 British Railways renamed it "Helmdon Village".

Passenger traffic was sparse, with Helmdon being a village of only 516 people in 1901, and it was one of the least successful in terms of passenger traffic on the line. By the early 1950s, the limited services between Blisworth and Banbury Merton Street were attracting very few passengers and this resulted in the line's closure to passengers from Monday 2 July 1951, the final trains running on the previous Saturday. Goods traffic continued for three more months.

== Routes ==
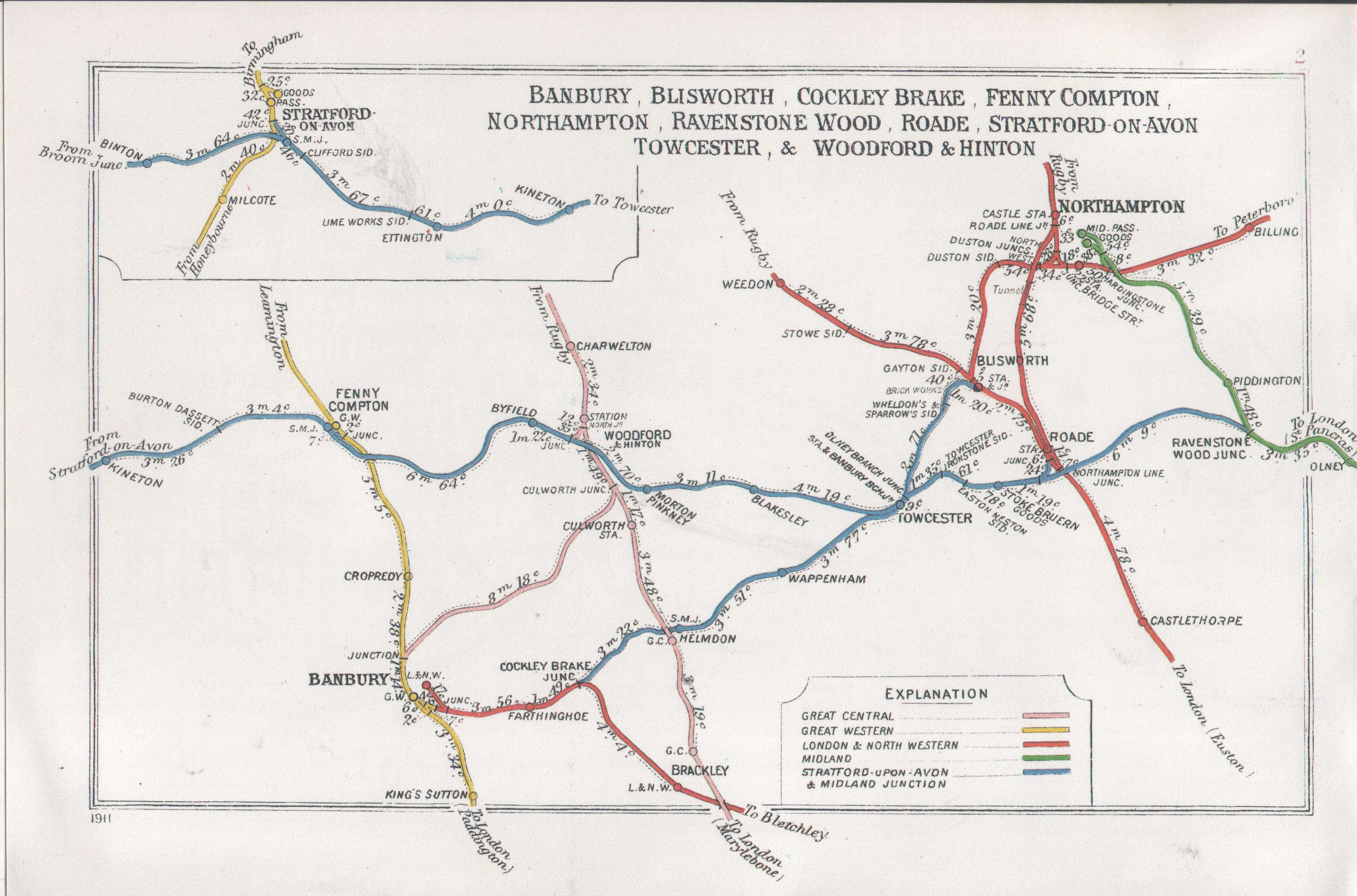
A 1911 Railway Clearing House map of railways around Helmdon (lower centre; Helmdon Village is in blue labelled "S.M.J.").

Preceding station	Disused railways	Following station
Farthinghoe	SMJR; Northampton and Banbury Junction Railway	Wappenham

== Present day ==
The station buildings were used for some time as a bus garage, before being demolished. From Helmdon, the abandoned trackbed passes beneath the still-extant Great Central viaduct (itself disused and derelict), while Cockley Brake junction is obscured by dense vegetation.
