= Thomas Billing =

English judge

Sir Thomas Billing (died 1481) was an English judge and Chief Justice of the King's Bench.

== Early life and career ==
Billing is said by Fuller to have been a native of Northamptonshire, where two villages near Northampton bear his name, and to have afterwards lived in state at Astwell in that county. Lord Campbell says he was an attorney's clerk; but this seems doubtful. He was, at any rate, a member of Gray's Inn. Writing to one Ledam, Billing says : 'I would ye should do well, because ye are a fellow of Gray's Inn, where I was fellow ' (Paston Letters, i. 43, 53), and, according to a Gray's Inn manuscript, he was a reader there. His social position was sufficient to enable him to be on terms of intimacy with the families of Paston and of Baron Grey de Ruthyn.

He was Burgess (Member of Parliament) for Northamptonshire, 1445–46; Burgess (Member of Parliament) for London, 1449, and Recorder of London, 1450–1454. Along with seven others he received the coif as serjeant-at-law on 2 January 1453 – 1454, and in the Hilary term of that year is first mentioned as arguing at the bar. Thenceforward his name is frequent in the reports.

== King's serjeant ==
Lord-chancellor Waynflete appointed him king's Serjeant 21 April 1458, and Lord Campbell, citing an otherwise unknown pamphlet of Billing in favour of the Lancastrian cause, says that with the attorney-general and solicitor-general he argued the cause of King Henry VI at the bar of the House of Lords. The entry in the Parliamentary Rolls, however, indicates that the judges and king's Serjeants excused themselves from giving an opinion in the matter. About the same time Billing appears to have been knighted, and on the accession of Edward IV his patent of king's Serjeant was renewed, and in the first parliament of this reign he was named, along with Serjeants Lyttelton and Laken, a referee in a cause between the Bishop of Winchester and some of his tenants. He is said by Lord Campbell to have exerted himself actively against King Henry, Queen Margaret, and the Lancastrians, and to have helped to frame the act of attainder of Sir John Fortescue, chief justice of the king's bench, for being engaged in the Battle of Towton, and to have advised the grant of a pardon, on condition that the opinions of the treatise 'De Laudibus' should be retracted.

== Judge of the King's Bench ==
At any rate, in 1464 (9 Aug.), Billing was added to the three judges of the king's bench, but by the king's writ only: and the question being thereupon raised, it was decided that a commission in addition to the writ was required for the appointment of a justice of assize. Baker in his Chronology,' and Hale in his 'Pleas of the Crown,' says that on the trial of Walter Walker for treason in 1460, for having said to his son, 'Tom, if thou behavest thyself well, I will make thee heir to the Crown' i.e. of the Crown Inn, of which he was landlord, Billing ruled a conviction, and Lord Campbell accepts the story. But it would seem from the report of the judgment of Chief-justice Bromley in the trial of Sir Nicholas Throckmorton, 17 April 1554, that the judge at that trial was John Markham, afterwards chief justice next before Billing, and that he directed an acquittal.

== Chief Justice of the King's Bench ==
Billing succeeded Markham as chief justice of the king's bench in 23 January 1468 – 1469, having precedence over Yelverton and Bingham, justices of the king's bench; and this office he retained in spite of political changes. For when Henry VI for a few months regained the throne new patents were at once issued, 9 October 1470; and when Edward IV overthrew him, 17 June 1471, he, along with almost all the other judges, was confirmed in his seat. It is suggested that he may have owed this less to his legal talents than to the support of the Earl of Warwick. In 1477 Billing tried Burdet of Arrow, Warwickshire, a dependent of the Duke of Clarence, for treason, committed in 1474, in saying of a stag, 'I wish that the buck, horns and all, were in the king's belly,' for which he was executed. Billing is also said to have been concerned in the trial of the Duke of Clarence himself. He continued to sit in court until 5 May 1481, when he died testate and was buried in Bittlesden Abbey, Buckinghamshire. His tombstone is now in Wappenham Church, Northamptonshire. His successor was Sir William Hussey.

== Family life ==
He married (1st) Katherine Gifford, who died 8 March 1479. They had five sons, including Thomas, his heir, who died in 1500 without male issue, and four daughters.

He married (2nd) Mary Folville, widow successively of William Cotton, Receiver-general of the Duchy of Lancaster, Treasurer of the Queen's Household (killed at the 2nd Battle of St. Albans in 1461), and Thomas Lacy, of Grantchester, Cambridgeshire (died 1479), and daughter and co-heiress of John Folville, Esq., of Sileby, Rotherby, Queniborough, etc., Leicestershire, by Joan, daughter of Robert Wesenham (died 1399), of Conington, Huntingdonshire. She was born about 1423 (aged 54 in 1477).

In 1483, his widow and executrix, Mary, sued William Stokker, Knt., Mayor of the Staple of Calais, in the Exchequer of Pleas regarding a debt. She was pardoned 20 Nov. 1484. Mary died 14 March 1499/1500, and was buried on the south side of the altar of the church of St. Margaret, Westminster, Middlesex by her 1st husband.
