= John Markham =

John Markham may refer to:

- John Markham (judge), English judge
- John Markham (Royal Navy officer) (1761–1827), British admiral
- Johnny Markham (1908–1975), American baseball player
- John Markham (died 1559), MP for Nottinghamshire (UK Parliament constituency) and Nottingham
