= Crowfield, Northamptonshire =

Hamlet in Northamptonshire, England

Coordinates: 52.0696°N 1.1036°W

Crowfield
- Location within Northamptonshire
- OS grid reference: SP615416
- Civil parish: Syresham
- Unitary authority: West Northamptonshire
- Ceremonial county: Northamptonshire
- Region: East Midlands
- Country: England
- Sovereign state: United Kingdom
- Post town: Brackley
- Postcode district: NN13
- Police: Northamptonshire
- Fire: Northamptonshire
- Ambulance: East Midlands
- UK Parliament: South Northamptonshire

Crowfield is a hamlet of some two dozen houses in the civil parish of Syresham in a part of the English county of Northamptonshire popularly known as Banburyshire. It is situated in the ancient Whittlewood Forest and in ancient times was on the borders of Mercia and Wessex. The population is included in the civil parish of Syresham.

It is administered as part of West Northamptonshire.

There is evidence of pre-Roman habitation in the immediate vicinity of Crowfield, and the outlines of Roman fields can be seen from aerial photographs at the west end of the hamlet.

About a mile to the north there is a densely wooded enclosure known as The Old Mountains. This was a moated site which contained a storage barn used by the pre-reformation Cistercian Abbey of St. Mary and St. Nicholas at Biddlesden, for storage of produce it received as tithes.

Following the dissolution of the monasteries most of the land around Crowfield initially passed to Magdalen College, Oxford.
