= Falcutt =

Hamlet in Northamptonshire, England

Coordinates: 52.0800°N 1.1327°W

- Location within Northamptonshire
- OS grid reference: SP5942
- Unitary authority: West Northamptonshire
- Ceremonial county: Northamptonshire
- Region: East Midlands
- Country: England
- Sovereign state: United Kingdom
- Post town: Brackley
- Postcode district: NN13
- Dialling code: 01295
- Police: Northamptonshire
- Fire: Northamptonshire
- Ambulance: East Midlands
- UK Parliament: Daventry

Falcutt (or Fancote) is a hamlet in the English county of Northamptonshire. With Astwell, it forms part the civil parish of Helmdon and is south of the village of that name. Historically, Falcutt and Astwell were part of the Wappenham parish.
