= Syresham =

Village in Northamptonshire, England

Coordinates: 52.07009°N 1.08230°W

- Location within Northamptonshire
- Population: 805 (2001 census); 855 (2011 census)
- OS grid reference: SP670440
- Unitary authority: West Northamptonshire
- Ceremonial county: Northamptonshire
- Region: East Midlands
- Country: England
- Sovereign state: United Kingdom
- Post town: BRACKLEY
- Postcode district: NN13
- Dialling code: 01280
- Police: Northamptonshire
- Fire: Northamptonshire
- Ambulance: East Midlands
- UK Parliament: South Northamptonshire

Syresham is a village and civil parish in West Northamptonshire, England. The civil parish population at the 2011 census was 855. It is near Brackley town and close to Silverstone Circuit. It is surrounded by villages and hamlets such as Biddlesden, Whitfield, Helmdon, Silverstone and Wappenham, and the border with Buckinghamshire lies just to the south of the village. The border itself is defined by the River Great Ouse, which rises within the parish. There are two small hamlets in the parish: Crowfield and Pimlico.

The village's name means 'homestead/village of Sigehere' or 'hemmed-in land of Sigehere'.

The local geology includes the cornbrash and oolitic limestone of Jurassic age. There is a large abandoned quarry north of the church which supplied the stone for many of the older buildings in the village. The population, like so many other villages in England, is now much lower than even a century ago due to the British Agricultural Revolution. There are the remains of a very large fishpond south of the church and close to the manor house. The dam wall still stands, but the pond was drained long ago for its rich pasture.

Following the dissolution of the monasteries most of the land in and around Syresham passed to Magdalen College, Oxford. Much of the estate has now been sold off, however

There are several deserted medieval villages nearby, including Astwell near Helmdon, the site of the still standing keep or gatehouse of Astwell Castle.

== Local woods ==
An old forest town, it is surrounded by the remnants of ancient woodland, the hunting grounds for several English kings such as Richard III. They include Whistley wood near Brackley and Hazelborough wood near Silverstone. Further afield is Yardley Chase and Whittlewood Forest. They are mainly owned by the Forestry Commission and are crossed by many public footpaths and some byways and bridleways leading to the village. The woods have a diverse range of trees, including oak, beech, hazel and some conifer stands. The hazel will have been coppiced in previous times, but are now completely neglected. All of the ancient woods are surrounded by deep ditches, a common indicator of their great age and importance in the Medieval period.

There is a Site of Special Scientific Interest or SSSI near Hazelborough wood which hosts rare marsh plants including orchids. It is known as Syresham Marshy Meadows and hosts a number of very rare plants owing to its waterlogged condition.

The woods are rich in a wide range of plants, especially common bluebells and primroses (or Primula vulgaris) in the spring, and associated orchids as well as the yellow rattle. There is a diverse fauna including mammals such as red deer and muntjac, and birds such as the common buzzard and red kites are also seen in the parish.

== Facilities ==
The village possesses a public house, the Kings Head, a sub post office, primary school, church and chapel. It has a thriving social life, with a Sports and Social Club (football field and cricket pitch), and several local societies (such as the Syresham History Society). There are several Grade II listed buildings, including The Priory, and The Old College Farmhouse. St. James' Church, dating from the 12th century, is Grade II* listed.

It is bypassed by the A43 trunk road and is the western terminus of the Ouse Valley Way long distance footpath. It is traversed by Welsh lane, a Drovers' road used to bring cattle and sheep to London before the railways killed off the droving business. The lane has wide verges at many places between the village and Buckingham which were ideal for grazing the livestock. There are the remains or stump of a hanging tree at the cross-roads just south of Biddlesden.

== Sport ==
Sport has always played a central part in village life. Syreham currently has one football team playing in the North Bucks & District Football League and two senior cricket teams playing in the Northants Cricket League. Syresham also has a darts team, a dominoes team and a bowls club. For those who play rugby, Brackley Rugby Union Football Club is only 4 miles away. Syresham also has a golf society, the Gytte Lane Club, and several courses within a ten-mile drive.

== Awards ==
Syresham won village of the year awards in 2008, 2009 and 2010; 2012–2013, 2015 and 2017, being awarded the best community within the region. Contributions to this were events such as the village Scarecrow Festival and village pantomime. The village pantomime celebrated its 10th anniversary in 2009 with a brilliant production of Cinderella.

== Bibliography ==
- Victoria County History Northampton
- Philip Pettit, Syresham, A Forest Village and its Chapel, Syresham History (1996)
