= Wappenham railway station =

Former railway station in Northamptonshire, England

Coordinates: 52.111835°N 1.073678°W

Wappenham

General information
- Location: Wappenham and Slapton, West Northamptonshire; England
- Grid reference: SP635463
- Platforms: 1

Other information
- Status: Disused

History
- Original company: Northampton and Banbury Junction Railway
- Pre-grouping: Stratford-upon-Avon and Midland Junction Railway
- Post-grouping: London, Midland and Scottish Railway; London Midland Region of British Railways

Key dates
- 1 June 1872: Opened
- 2 July 1951: Closed to passengers
- 29 October 1951: Goods facilities withdrawn
Location

Wappenham was a railway station on the Stratford-upon-Avon and Midland Junction Railway (SMJ) which served the Northamptonshire village of Wappenham between 1872 and 1951. Serving a relatively rural area, the station saw considerable goods traffic generated by local farming communities, but passenger traffic was low which ultimately led to its closure.

== History ==
In August 1871, the Northampton and Banbury Junction Railway extended its line from Towcester to Helmdon. A small wayside station was constructed in an isolated spot about a mile from the village of Wappenham from which it took its name. A single-platform was provided on the down side, with a single siding goods yard to the east. The siding was linked to the main line at each end, forming a loop which enabled the yard to be shunted by up or down trains. A symmetrical red brick station building crowned by two large chimneys, similar in style to those at Fairford and Alvescot on the East Gloucestershire Railway, was situated next to the platform and had a central door which led to the waiting room and a separate ladies' waiting room, as well as the ticket and parcels offices; staff accommodation was at the east end of the structure whilst the gentleman's toilets were at the opposite end.

The station served as a useful railhead not only for Wappenham, but also the nearby villages of Slapton and Abthorpe, whose farming communities made use of it for hay and cattle traffic. The station's siding was also of use to RAF Silverstone during the Second World War. Passenger traffic was however sparse, Wappenham was only a small village of 383 people in 1901, and it was one of the least successful in terms of passenger traffic on the line. By the early 1950s, the limited services between Blisworth and Banbury were attracting very few passengers and this resulted in the line's closure to passengers from Monday 2 July 1951, the final trains running on the previous Saturday. Goods traffic continued for three more months.

== Routes ==
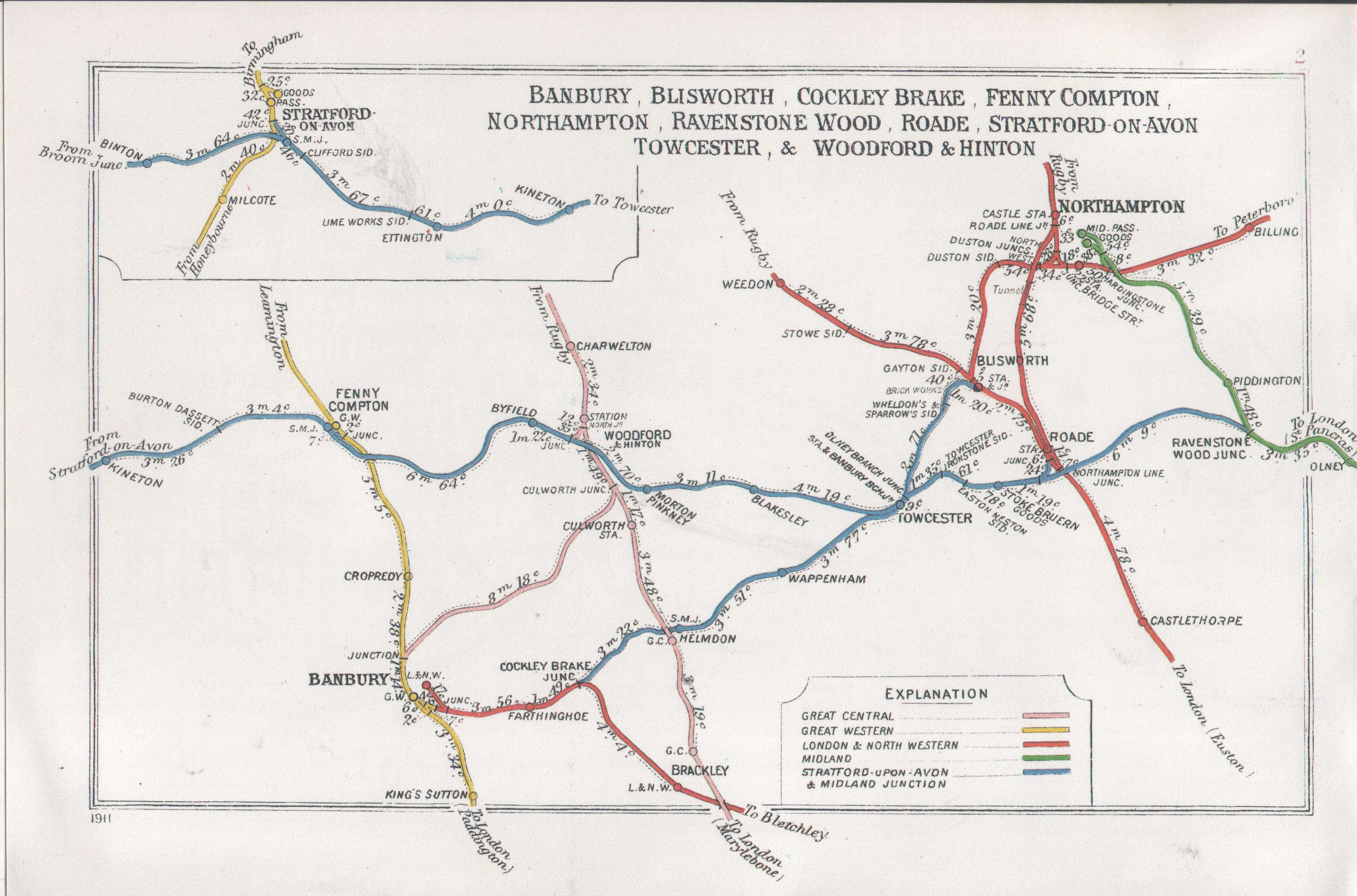
A 1911 Railway Clearing House map of railways in the vicinity of Wappenham (lower centre, in blue)

| Preceding station | Disused railways | Following station |
|---|---|---|
| Helmdon Village | SMJR; Northampton and Banbury Junction Railway | Towcester |

== Present day ==
The station buildings were demolished after closure and a sewage treatment works has been built on the former railway alignment.
