= Wappenham =

Village in Northamptonshire, England

Coordinates: 52.1043°N 1.0889°W

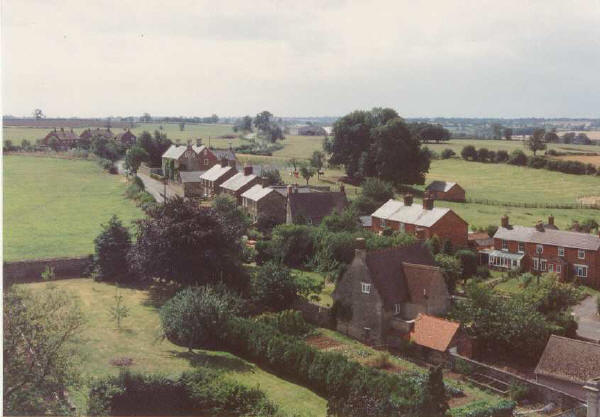
- View Towards Helmdon, Wappenham

- Location within Northamptonshire
- Population: 294 (2011 Census)
- OS grid reference: SP6245
  - London: 70 miles (113 km)
- Unitary authority: West Northamptonshire
- Ceremonial county: Northamptonshire
- Region: East Midlands
- Country: England
- Sovereign state: United Kingdom
- Post town: Towcester
- Postcode district: NN12
- Dialling code: 01327
- Police: Northamptonshire
- Fire: Northamptonshire
- Ambulance: East Midlands
- UK Parliament: South Northamptonshire

Wappenham is a linear village and civil parish in West Northamptonshire, England. It is 5 miles (8 km) south-west of Towcester, north of Syresham and north-west of Silverstone and forms part of West Northamptonshire. At the time of the 2001 census, the parish's population was 266 people, increasing to 294 at the 2011 Census.

The village's name means 'homestead/village of Waeppa' or 'hemmed-in land of Waeppa'.

== Buildings ==
Wappenham has some of the earliest architectural works by Sir George Gilbert Scott.^{[a]}

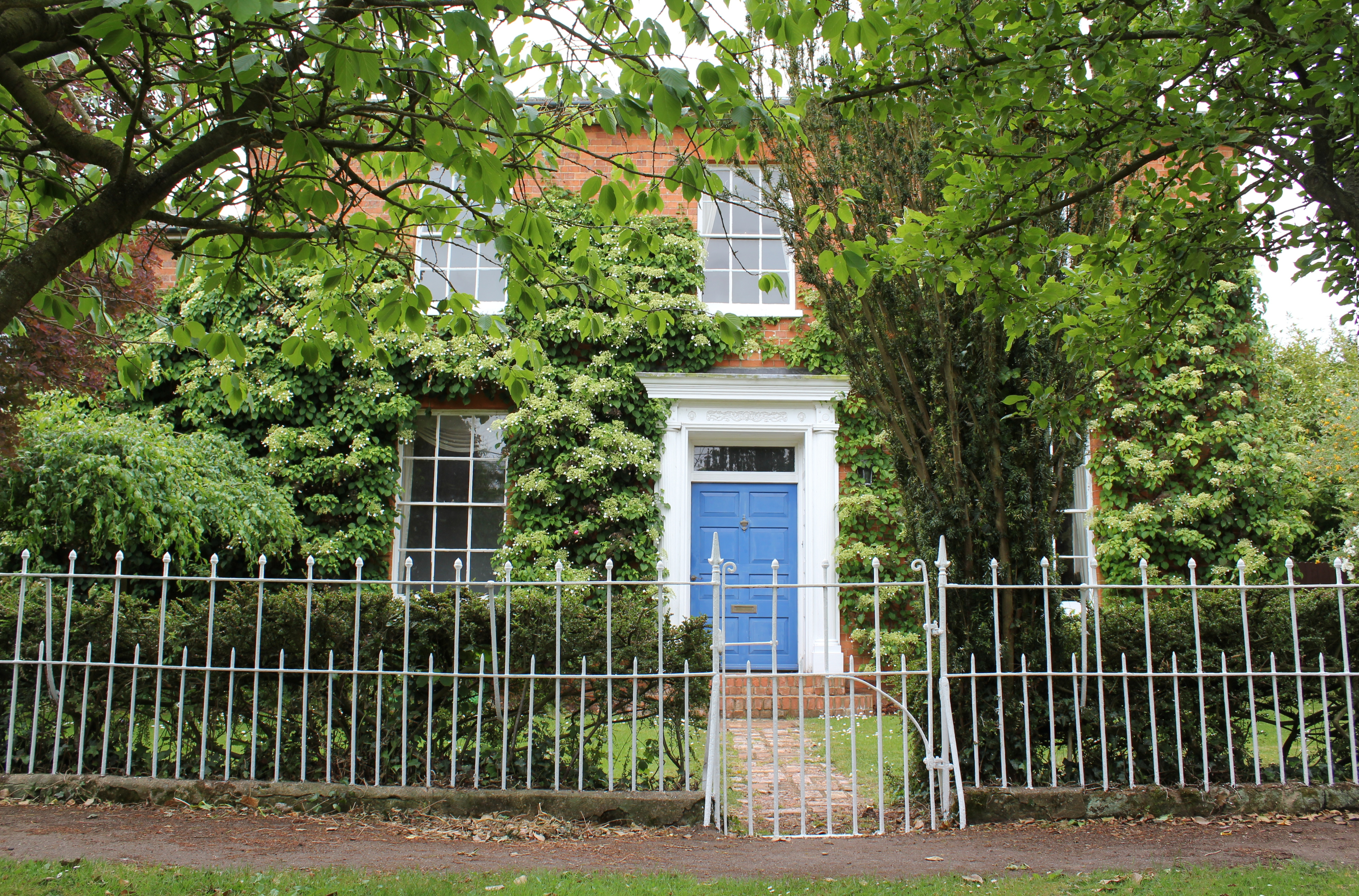
Gilbert Scott's Vicarage

The red-brick vicarage, east of the church, built in 1833 as a home for his father Reverend Thomas Scott who was vicar of Wappenham at the time, was Gilbert Scott's first work, built while he was still an assistant architect. Pevsner describes it as "...only remarkable for being Sir George Gilbert Scott's first building". The village also contains four other houses designed by Gilbert Scott, and on the village green there is a still-functional red K6 telephone box designed by Gilbert Scott's grandson Giles Gilbert Scott.

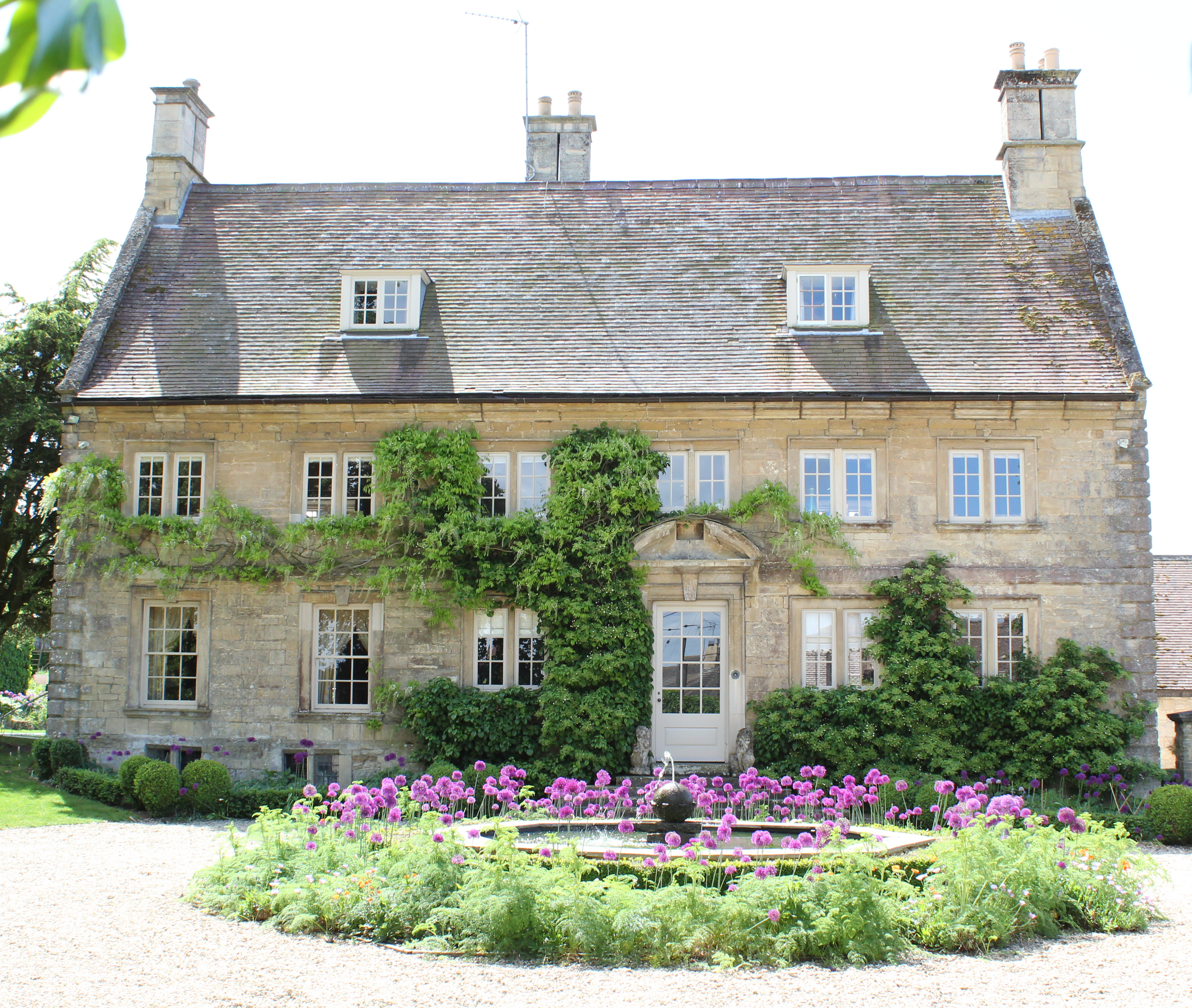
Wappenham House

The Manor House Wappenham west of the church is dated 1704.

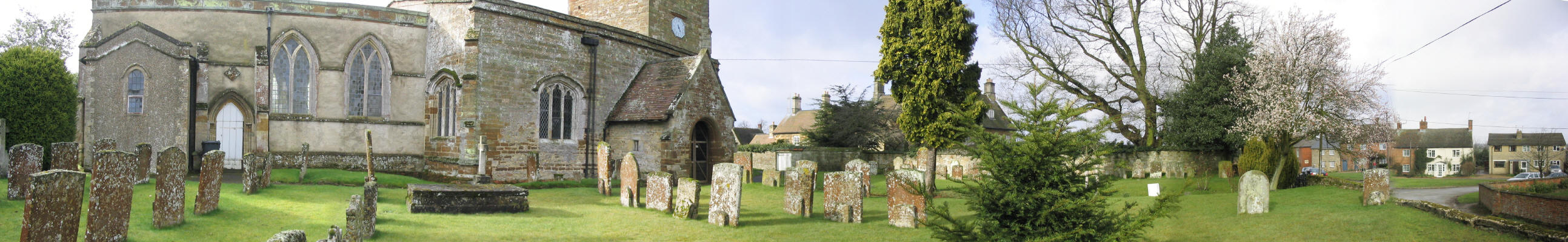
St Mary the Virgin

The church is 13th century and dedicated to St Mary. There are several monuments located there to various individuals, including Thomas Lovett of Astwell Castle (d.1492), Thomas Lovett III (d.1542), Constance Butler (d.1499), and Sir Thomas Billing (d.1481), Chief Justice, of Biddlesden Abbey, Buckinghamshire.

Wappenham had its own railway station until 1951, on the former Towcester/Banbury line between Helmdon and Greens Norton Junction. The last train on the line ran on 12 July 1953.
