= Towcester railway station =

Former railway station in Northamptonshire, England

Coordinates: 52.138753°N 0.994625°W

Towcester
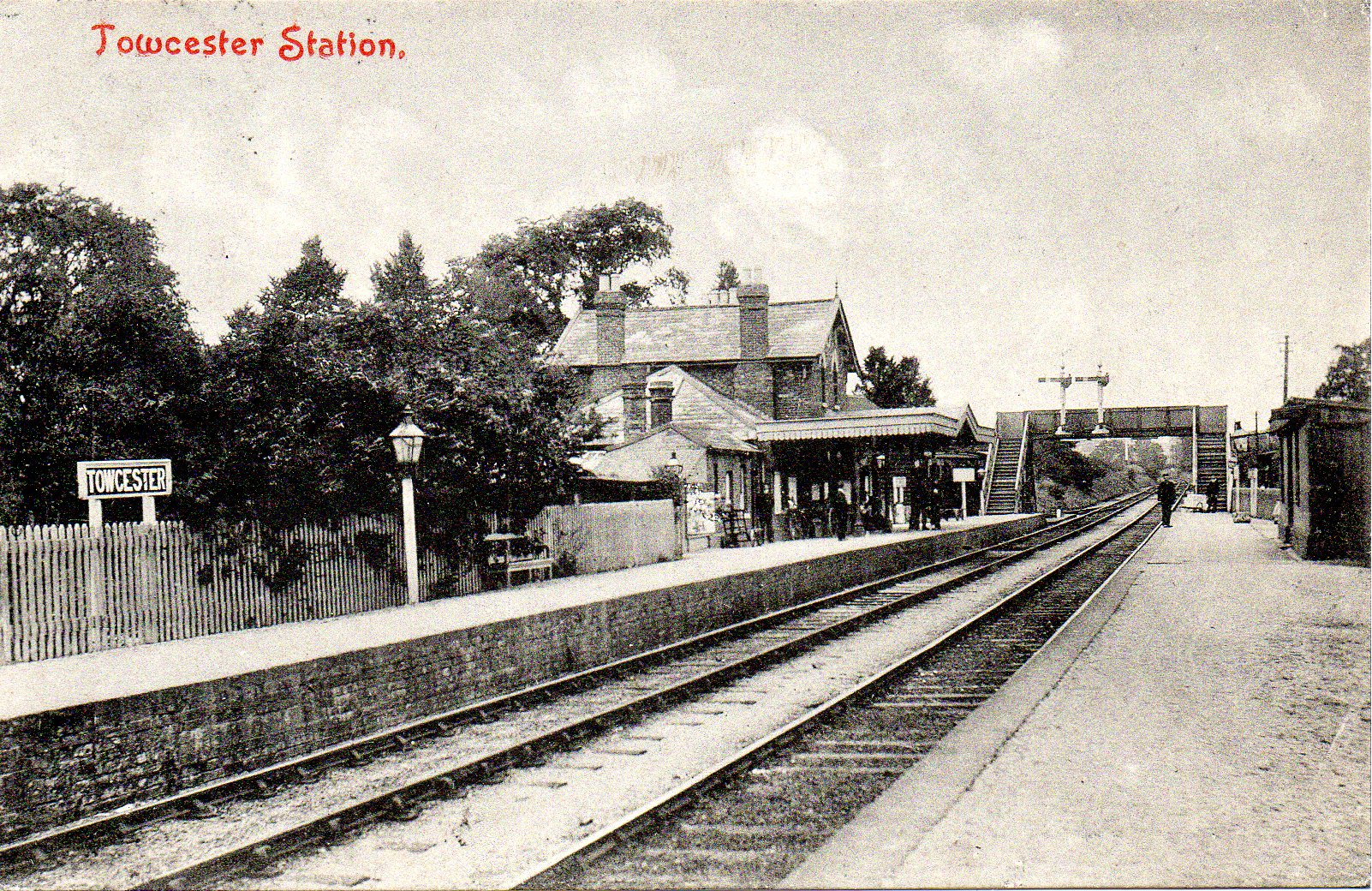

General information
- Location: Towcester, West Northamptonshire; England
- Grid reference: SP689494
- Platforms: 3

Other information
- Status: Disused

History
- Original company: Northampton and Banbury Junction Railway
- Pre-grouping: Stratford-upon-Avon and Midland Junction Railway
- Post-grouping: London, Midland and Scottish Railway; London Midland Region of British Railways

Key dates
- 1 May 1866: Opened
- 7 April 1952: Closed to passengers
- 3 February 1964: Goods facilities withdrawn
Location

Towcester was a railway station on the Stratford-upon-Avon and Midland Junction Railway which served the town of Towcester in Northamptonshire, England between 1866 and 1964.

It once served as an interchange for services to Stratford, Banbury and Olney. It also saw substantial traffic on racedays at Towcester Racecourse. Its closure came as the various interconnecting lines to the station closed one by one in the 1950s and 1960s. Passenger services ended in 1952, predating the Beeching closures.

== History ==
=== Opening ===
In 1863, the Northampton and Banbury Junction Railway (N&BJ), a forerunner of the Stratford-upon-Avon and Midland Junction Railway (SMJ), received an act of Parliament, the Northampton and Banbury Junction Railway Act 1863 (26 & 27 Vict. c. ccxx), giving authorisation to construct an 18 miles (29 km) line from the London and North Western Railway's Blisworth station on their London to Birmingham line to Cockley Brake junction, at which point the new branch would form a junction with the existing Banbury to Verney Junction Branch Line. The public opening of the section of line from Blisworth to Towcester took place on 30 April 1866, with Towcester station formally opening to traffic the next day. The remainder of the line was finally opened by 1 June 1872.

=== Station buildings and layout ===
The station was a major centre of the SMJ. It was the only station on the line to have three platform faces (one up and two down platforms), and the down platforms were linked to the up platform by the line's only footbridge. The main station buildings, a two-storey gabled structure built of brick, were situated on the up platform. A small platform canopy projected from the front of this building, with its central section unusually raised in an inverted "V". Small single-storey extensions flanked either side of the main building. Inside the building, there was a booking office, waiting room and toilet facilities, as well as accommodation for the stationmaster. Extensive sidings were provided: the down side holding 126 wagons and the up side three wagons; there was also a 42 feet (13 m) locomotive turntable which was transferred from Stratford in 1908.

Until the amalgamation of the NBJ and SMJ in 1910, both companies ran over the same stretch of single track as far as Greens Norton junction where the line to Banbury diverged southwards from the line to Stratford. This required a signal box at each end of Towcester station and a third at the junction. Amalgamation resulted in the abolition of the junction and its replacement with two separate tracks running parallel from Towcester before separating at Greens Norton. The three signal boxes were replaced by a new high box at the Blisworth end of the down platform, to which access could be had from the footbridge. This was altered in 1926 when the London, Midland and Scottish Railway (LMSR), which had taken over the line upon the railway grouping, installed a new footbridge and separate steps were provided to the box.

=== Traffic ===
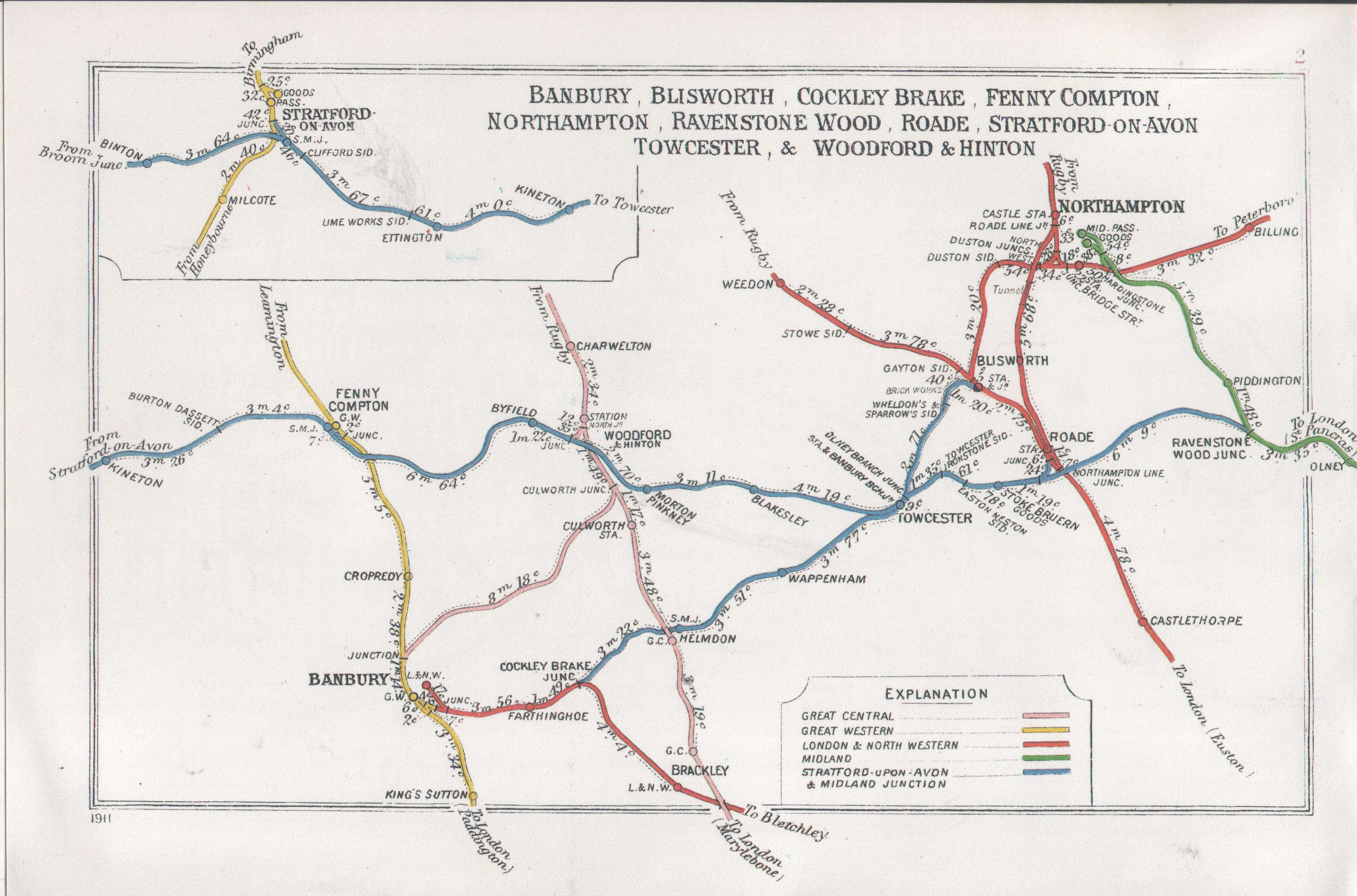
A 1911 Railway Clearing House map of railways in the vicinity of Towcester (centre right, in blue)

Until 1893, Towcester served as a junction station for services to Olney railway station, as well as an interchange for Blisworth to Banbury services and Blisworth to Stratford services. Around four services a day called from Olney to provide a connection with Stratford services. The 1920s saw Towcester at its busiest on weekday mornings at 9am, with three passenger services scheduled to depart: one for Banbury, one for Broom and one for Blisworth. The station also saw special services for Towcester Racecourse, which was particularly known for the Grafton Hunt Steeplechase on Easter Mondays which attracted between 7,000 and 8,000 visitors to the town. Between 1927 and 1939 the LMSR laid on regular excursion trains from St. Pancras. Specials also ran from Winslow and Oxford, combining at Verney Junction and continuing on the Banbury branch.

The routes into Towcester began to close to passengers from the beginning of the 1950s: Banbury to Towcester closed entirely on 30 June 1951 and Blisworth to Stratford closed to passengers on 7 April 1952. The line to Cockley Brake junction was lifted towards the end of 1955 and the SMJ's station at Blisworth closed to passengers in 1960. The section from Towcester to Ravenstone Wood junction remained used by freight until June 1958, and the line south to Olney closed as a result of the construction of the M1 motorway. The last section to remain open was from Woodford West junction to Blisworth which closed to goods in February 1964.

Preceding station	Disused railways	Following station
Blakesley	SMJR; East and West Junction Railway	Terminus
Wappenham	SMJR; Northampton and Banbury Junction Railway	Tiffield
Terminus	SMJR; Stratford-upon-Avon, Towcester and Midland Junction Railway	Stoke Bruern

== Present day ==
The station buildings, which were of no interest to the local community, were demolished to be replaced by a light industrial estate, a Tesco supermarket and a car salesroom. The Towcester bypass has severed the trackbed near Greens Norton junction, but a section of embankment remains intact to the south of the road.
