= Biddlesden Park =

Country house in Biddlesden, Buckinghamshire, England

Coordinates: 52.053904°N 1.079091°W

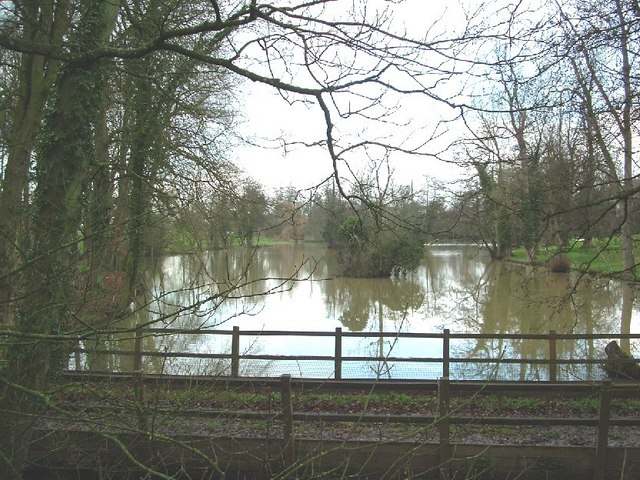
The lake at Biddlesden Park

Biddlesden Park is a country house at Biddlesden in north-west Buckinghamshire. It is a Grade II* listed building.

== History ==
The house, which lies on the site of an old Cistercian abbey, was built by John Sayer, in the Georgian style in 1727. The staircase dates from the same period. The house then passed to Ralph Verney, 2nd Earl Verney before it was acquired, on Verney's death in 1791, by George Morgan, who was High Sheriff of Buckinghamshire. The house remained in the ownership of the Morgan and then the Morgan-Grenville family for most of the 19th century. It was bought by Lieutenant Colonel Reginald Badger in around 1932 and then remained in the Badger family for many years before passing to Mrs. Elizabeth Maud Gordon. It was then comprehensively renovated in the 1980s.

The church of St Margaret of Scotland is situated in the grounds of Biddlesden Park.
