= Biddlesden Abbey =

Cistercian abbey in Buckinghamshire, UK

Coordinates: 52°03′14″N 1°04′47″W

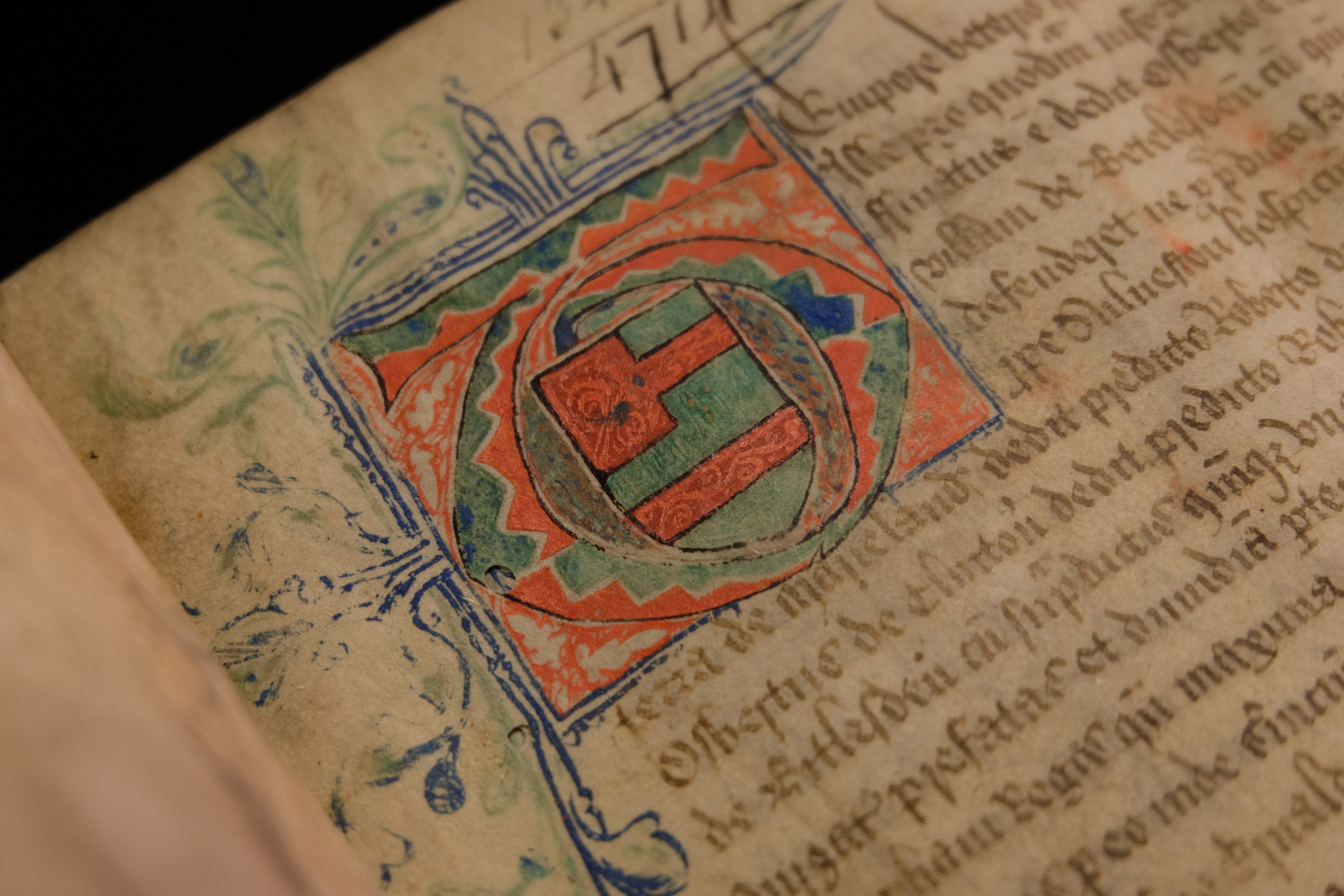
Arms of Biddlesden Abbey in its cartulary, now British Library, Harley MS 4714, fol. 1r.

Biddlesden was a Cistercian abbey founded in 1147 by Ernald (or Arnold) de Bosco (de Bois), steward to the Earl of Leicester. The first monks came from the earl's own foundation at Garendon. Ernald's claim to the land appears to have been dubious, and lengthy litigation ensued before the monks could take possession of the site. Abbot William Wibert was deposed in 1198 for fraud, gross immorality and bribery. In 1192 he had been deposed as cellarer for similar misdemeanours. In 1237 Henry III granted wood for choir stalls, suggesting that the church was being rebuilt at this time. In the 14th to 15th centuries there was a long running dispute with the parish of Wappenham concerning the collection of tithes. It was not a wealthy house for and would have been dissolved in 1536 if the monks had not petitioned, and paid, for its continuation. At the Valor Ecclesiasticus survey of 1535 the abbey had an income of £125, and there were eleven monks. The monastery was finally surrendered in September 1538 and became the possession of Thomas Wriothesley, Earl of Southampton.

The abbey was bought in 1538 by Sir Robert Peckham, who converted part of the buildings into a house. In the 1730s, the ruins of the abbey were demolished and a new house built upon the site, Biddlesden Park, now a Grade II listed building. A few stones from the abbey remain but not in situ.

== Burials ==
- William la Zouche, 1st Baron Zouche
- William la Zouche, 2nd Baron Zouche
- William la Zouche, 3rd Baron Zouche (c. 1355 – 4 May 1396)
- William la Zouche, 6th Baron Zouche, 7th Baron St Maur
