= Helmdon railway station =

Former Great Central Railway station in Northamptonshire, United Kingdom

Coordinates: 52.0828°N 1.1459°W

Helmdon
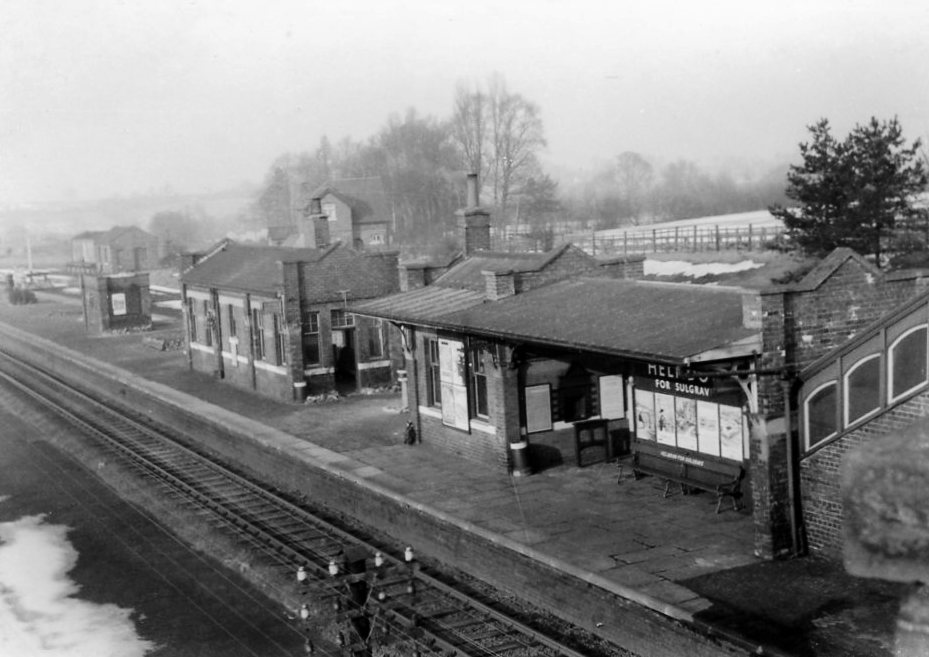

General information
- Location: Helmdon, West Northamptonshire; England
- Grid reference: SP586430
- Platforms: 2

Other information
- Status: Disused

History
- Original company: Great Central Railway
- Pre-grouping: Great Central Railway
- Post-grouping: London and North Eastern Railway; London Midland Region of British Railways

Key dates
- 15 March 1899: Opened as Helmdon
- 1928: Renamed Helmdon for Sulgrave
- 4 March 1963: station closed to passengers
- 2 November 1964: closure to goods
- 1966: line closed
Location

Helmdon railway station served the village and civil parish of Helmdon in Northamptonshire on the former Great Central Main Line (GCR). It was the second of two stations in the parish, the first being Helmdon Village on the Stratford-upon-Avon and Midland Junction Railway.

== History ==
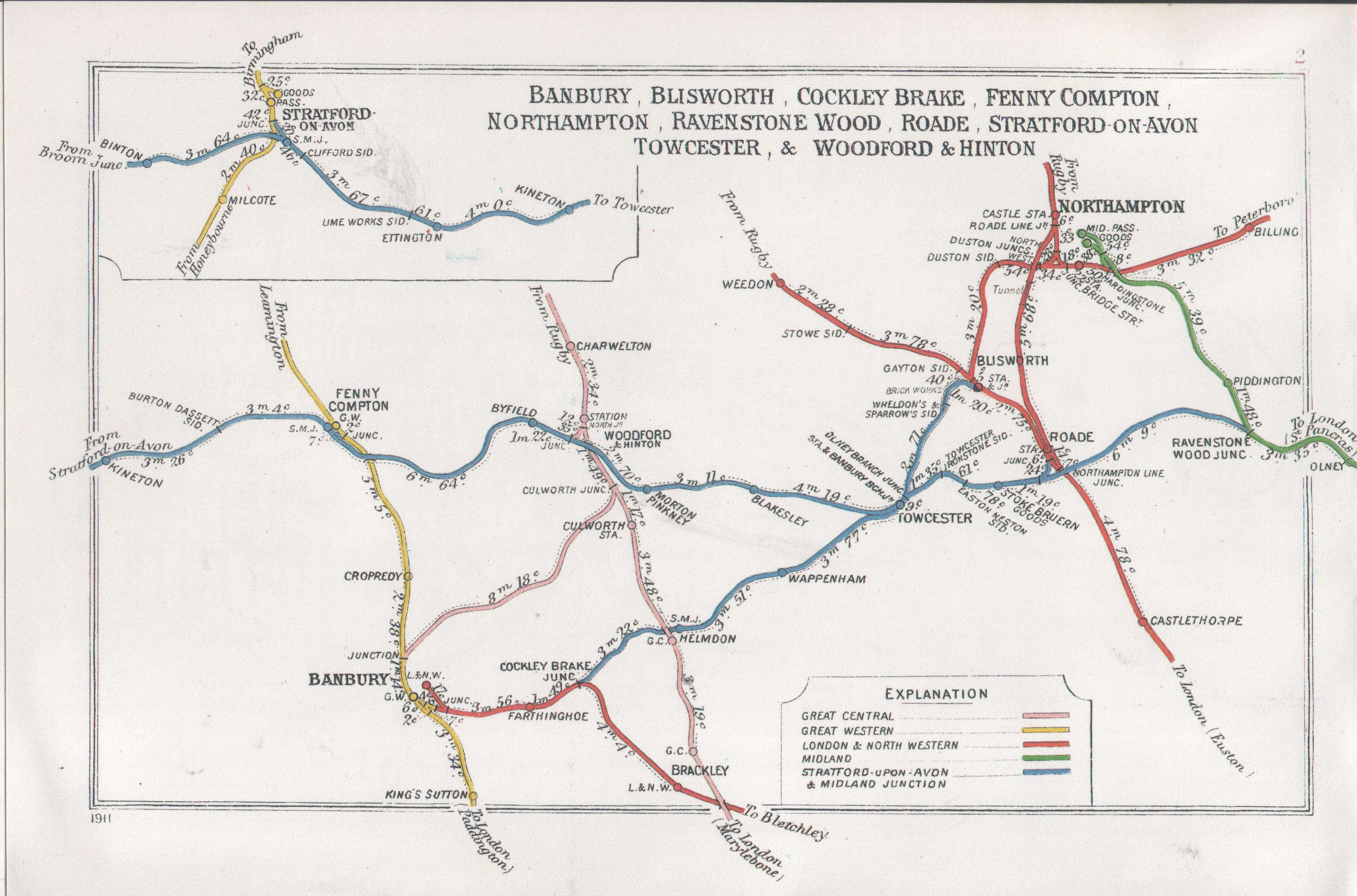
A 1911 Railway Clearing House map of railways in the vicinity of Helmdon (lower centre, in pink labelled "G.C.")

The GCR main line was the last main line to be built from northern England to London. It opened for passenger services on 15 March 1899 and for goods services in April. The station, originally named "Helmdon", opened with the line on 15 March 1899.

From the station the line ran northwards on an embankment before crossing the valley on the nine-arch Helmdon Viaduct over the River Tove.

Helmdon was the nearest station for Sulgrave Manor, which had been the home of George Washington's ancestors in the 16th and 17th centuries. In the 1920s the house was restored and opened as a museum, and due to this connection the LNER renamed Helmdon station "Helmdon for Sulgrave" in 1928.

British Railways closed the station to passengers on 4 March 1963 and to goods on 2 November 1964. In 1966 BR closed the line and the station was demolished. The platforms remain albeit largely hidden in the undergrowth. The viaduct remains.

== Route ==
Preceding station	Disused railways	Following station
Brackley Central; Line and station closed	Great Central Railway; London Extension	Culworth; Line and station closed

== See also ==
- The Reshaping of British Railways
