= Thomas Lovett III =

Thomas Lovett III (23 September 1473 - 16 December 1542) was High Sheriff of Northamptonshire in 1505, and was the King's Escheator in Northamptonshire in 1528 and 1533.

Lovett was born at Astwell Castle, Northamptonshire, England. His father, Thomas Lovett II, was amongst the principal landowners of Northamptonshire in the Commissions of the Peace issued by Edward IV, Richard III and Henry VII, and was High Sheriff of Northamptonshire in 1491. His mother was Anne Drayton. His siblings included Nicholas and Catharine. From his father's prior marriage, there were two half-sisters, Elizabeth and Margaret.

He married Elizabeth Boteler and with her had eight children, sons Thomas (heir apparent), William, and Nicholas, plus daughters Constance, Margaret, Elizabeth, and Anne. He remarried around 1514. With this wife, Jane Pinchpole, he had a son, George, and daughters, Elizabeth, Mary, and Bridget. Thirdly, he married Joan Billing, his cousin, in 1490, and they had one child, Thomas (d. 1510). His eldest son, Thomas IV, pre-deceased him and his grandson Thomas Lovett V, then aged 25, was his heir.
