= Biddlesden =

Village in Buckinghamshire, England

Coordinates: 52.056°N 1.077°W

- Location within Buckinghamshire
- Population: 113 (2011 Census)
- OS grid reference: SP6339
- Civil parish: Biddlesden
- Unitary authority: Buckinghamshire
- Ceremonial county: Buckinghamshire
- Region: South East
- Country: England
- Sovereign state: United Kingdom
- Post town: Brackley
- Postcode district: NN13
- Dialling code: 01280
- Police: Thames Valley
- Fire: Buckinghamshire
- Ambulance: South Central
- UK Parliament: Buckingham and Bletchley

Biddlesden is a village and civil parish in north-west Buckinghamshire, England on the boundary with Northamptonshire. It is about 5 miles (8 km) east-north-east of Brackley, Northamptonshire and 5 miles (8 km) north-west of Buckingham. The River Great Ouse forms part of the western boundary of the parish, separating the village from Northamptonshire. The ancient royal forest of Whittlewood extended to the northern edge of the village. It is within the unitary local authority of Buckinghamshire.

== History ==
The village toponym is derived from the Old English for either "house in a valley" or "Byttel's valley". In the Domesday Book of 1086 the village is recorded as Betesdene.

In 1147 Ernald de Bosco founded the Cistercian Biddlesden Abbey. In 1315, the village was granted a temporary charter to hold a weekly market. When the abbey was seized on behalf of Henry VIII during the Dissolution of the Monasteries it was assessed to be earning in excess of £175 annually in rents and tithes.

Although the abbey continued after this time as living accommodation for those in favour with the monarch, the building was not maintained thoroughly and fell into disrepair. By the 18th century the abbey was in ruins and was finally demolished in 1727. The country house of Biddlesden Park was built on the same site.

Within the parish of Biddlesden there was the hamlet of Evershaw. In the Anglo-Saxon Chronicle at the time of King Edward the Confessor this settlement was listed as being in the possession of a "certain bandy-legged man". Evershaw's toponym is derived from the Old English for "boar wood". The family names "Evershaw" and "Eversaw" are derived from this place. No trace of the hamlet remains today.
