= Helmdon =

Village in Northamptonshire, England

Coordinates: 52.089°N 1.148°W

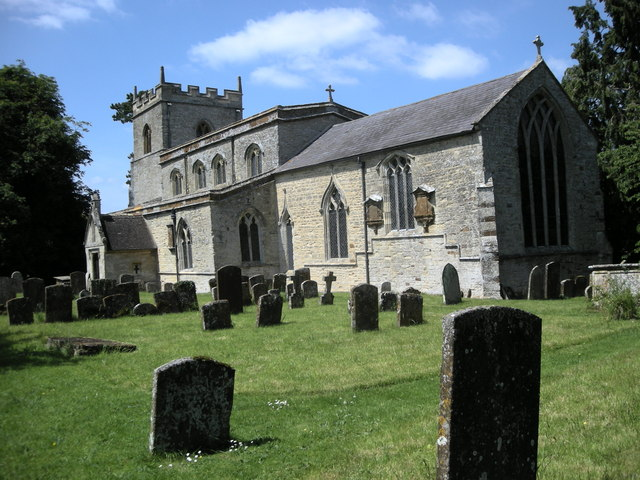
- St Mary Magdalene parish church

- Location within Northamptonshire
- Population: 899 (2011 census)
- OS grid reference: SP5843
  - London: 72 miles (116 km)
- Civil parish: Helmdon
- Unitary authority: West Northamptonshire
- Ceremonial county: Northamptonshire
- Region: East Midlands
- Country: England
- Sovereign state: United Kingdom
- Post town: Brackley
- Postcode district: NN13
- Dialling code: 01295
- Police: Northamptonshire
- Fire: Northamptonshire
- Ambulance: East Midlands
- UK Parliament: Northamptonshire South
- Website: Welcome to Helmdon

Helmdon is a village and civil parish about 4 miles (6.4 km) north of Brackley in West Northamptonshire, England. The village is on the River Tove, which is flanked by meadows that separate the village into two. The parish includes the hamlets of Astwell and Falcutt and covers more than 1,550 acres (630 ha). The 2011 census recorded a parish population of 899.

The villages name means 'Helma's valley'. Alternatively, 'Helma (= helmet)' may be the name of a nearby hill. Early spellings also reflect confusion with Old English 'hamol' meaning, 'maimed'.

== Manor ==
Helmdon's toponym is probably derived from Old English Helman denu "Helma's valley"; Helma is an unrecorded Old English masculine name. In the reign of Edward the Confessor two Saxons, Alwin and Godwin, held the manor "freely", i.e. without a feudal overlord. They were dispossessed after the Norman Conquest of England and the Domesday Book of 1086 records that Robert, Count of Mortain held a manor at "Elmedene". In the 12th century on William de Torewelle (Turville) held the manor of "Helmendene" of the fee of Leicester. On both occasions the manor was assessed at four hides. The toponym continued to evolve: in about 1340 it was recorded as Helmydene.

William's descendants continued as the lesser lords of Helmdon until the 16th century. In 1317 Nicholas de Turville granted 97 1/2 acres at Helmdon to his daughter Sarah and her husband Robert Lovett. In 1562 George Lovett sold Helmdon to Lancelot Wilton of Brackley, who 16 months later sold it on to Magdalen College, Oxford. The college remained Helmdon's largest landowner until at least the 18th century, by which time Worcester College, Oxford also held a significant estate in the parish.

Helmdon's main manor house, Overbury, seems to have been at the southern end of the village, south of the parish church. Slight earthworks suggest the position of not only the manor house but also other houses and three former ponds that may have been manorial fish ponds.

== Church and chapel ==
=== Church of England ===
The Church of England parish church of Saint Mary Magdalene is predominantly Decorated Gothic. English Heritage dates the earliest building work to the 14th century but local opinion holds the nave and aisles to be 13th century. It is a Grade II* listed building.

Until the English Reformation the church was dedicated to Saint Nicholas. The oldest parts are the nave and three-bay south aisle, which may be early 13th-century. The south aisle includes a tomb recess with a Purbeck Marble slab and foliated cross. The arcade of the north aisle is of a different style that suggests a later date, possibly late 13th-century. Authorities agree that the chancel is 14th-century. It has an ornately cusped, ogeed and crocketted piscina and three-bay sedilia, plus a low-side window on each side.

The clerestory of the nave was added later, possibly in the 15th century. The clerestory's timber roof ties and purlins may be 15th-century originals. The original west tower was probably 14th-century, but was rebuilt in 1823 reusing elements of the original Decorated Gothic masonry. The church was restored in 1841, and again under the direction of EF Law in 1876. During the restoration an Early English Gothic piscina was found under some pews in the north aisle, and was set in the wall near the north door.

Small sections of Medieval stained glass survive in the heads of some of the windows. One in the north-east window of the north aisle depicts a stonemason at work. It gives his name, William Campiun, and has been dated to 1313. This suggests that he was a benefactor, at least paying for the window and probably contributing to the building of the north aisle. Such a medieval representation of a craftsman or tradesman is unusual, and one giving his name and so precisely datable is particularly rare. However, stone-quarrying was by then a significant industry in Helmdon, it supplied most or all of the stone for the church, and leading local masons would have had considerable economic standing.

Taxation records show that in 1291 the Hospital of St John Baptist and St John Evangelist, Northampton held the rectory of Helmdon. It is now part of the parish of St Mary Magdalene, Helmdon with Stuchbury and Radstone, which in turn is part of the Benefice of the Astwell Group of Parishes.

The tower has a ring of six bells. Henry II Bagley of Chacombe cast the fourth, fifth and tenor bells in 1679. John Briant of Hertford cast the treble bell in 1797. The Taylor family of bellfounders of Loughborough cast the third bell in 1834, the second bell in 1855 and recast the fourth bell in 1890. Gillett & Johnston of Croydon recast the fifth bell in 1951. The church has also a Sanctus bell that was cast by an unidentified founder in about 1816.

The old Rectory may have been 16th-century or earlier. In 1856 the then Rector, Rev. Charles Milman Mount, had it demolished and replaced with a new one (now Helmdon House). In the porch of the 1856 rectory is the wooden lintel of a Tudor fireplace bearing a carved dragon, the year 1533 (or 35) and a set of initials.

=== Baptist ===
Helmdon Baptist chapel in Wappenham Road opened in 1841. In 1953 a schoolroom was added. The building became unsafe and was closed as a place of worship in 2004. Baptists from Helmdon now worship at Weston Baptist chapel, about 2 miles (3 km) away.

== Economic and social history ==
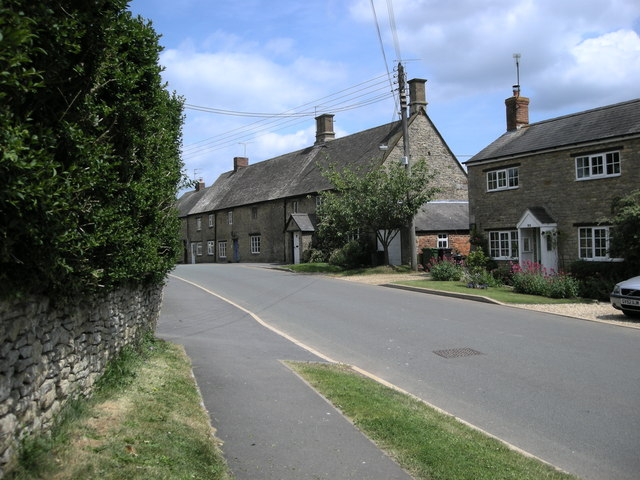
18th-century cottages in Wappenham Road

=== Building stone ===
Helmdon Stone is a pale limestone of the Middle Jurassic Taynton Limestone Formation. It is a freestone, i.e. it can be sawn in any direction to make ashlar. The quarries were on the north side of the Tove Valley, on the low ridge just beyond the northern edge of the village. There were either side of the minor roads to Weston and Sulgrave, extending about 1,000 yards (910 m) east–west from just east of the footpath to Weston Farm to the boundary of what became the course of the Great Central Main Line.

Stone may have been quarried in the parish since the late 13th century. Finely-carved stone used to build the Eleanor Cross at Hardingstone (started 1291) and to face the west front of the priory church of Canons Ashby Priory resembles that from Helmdon. In about 1340 Helmydene supplied stone to repair the Church of St James the Less, Sulgrave.

Helmdon stone gained fame in the late 17th century. For a century it was included in the building of some of the region's finest stately homes. The first was Stowe House, whose builders used Helmdon stone from 1677, and especially from 1710 to 1777. This was followed by Easton Neston House near Towcester, completed 1702; Blenheim Palace in the period 1705–10; and Woburn Abbey from 1749 to 1780. Helmdon may also have supplied stone to build Brackley Town Hall in 1705–06 and to remodel Canons Ashby House in 1708–10. In 1739 Helmdon supplied some of the stone for Shalstone House in Buckinghamshire.

Blenheim is 26 miles (42 km) from Helmdon, and most of its stone was supplied by much nearer quarries in Oxfordshire: either Burford and Taynton or Cornbury Park and Glympton. Woburn is 31 miles (50 km) away and most of its stone was supplied by nearer quarries at Ketton and Totternhoe. The inclusion of Helmdon stone in these prestigious projects shows how highly it was regarded at the time. Early 18th-century writers praised it as some of the finest building stone in England. However, after 1780 Helmdon stone ceased to be of more than local importance.

=== Lace ===
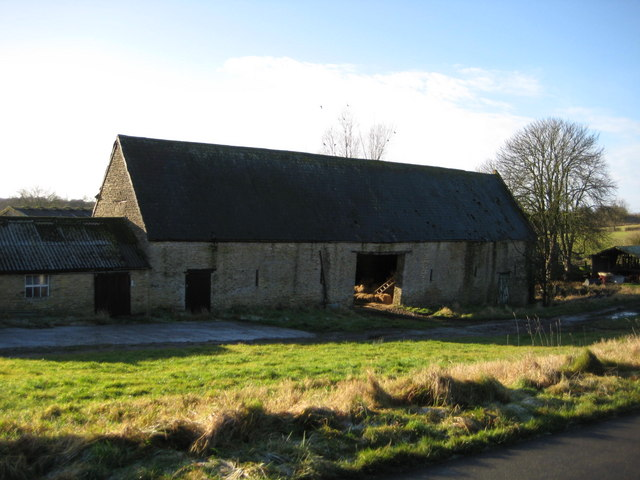
18th-century barn at Priory Farm

The trade of making lace by hand was a well-established cottage industry in the East Midlands by the late 16th century, and the earliest record of it in Helmdon dates from 1718. Makers around Towcester and Buckingham had a reputation for the finest lace, and although mechanised competition began with Heathcoat's bobbin net machine in 1808, quality lace-making by hand thrived for several more decades. Helmdon had lace-making schools that taught girls the trade from an early age. Lace-making in the parish peaked in the middle of the 19th century, when the 1851 census recorded that 94 women and girls – more than 30% of all Helmdon's female inhabitants – worked in the trade, and the youngest workers were under 10 years old. Thereafter mechanical lace-making did reduce the market for hand-made lace. The 1891 census recorded only six women in Helmdon employed in the trade, and only one of those was aged under 40.

=== Agriculture ===
Helmdon Inclosure Act 1757
- Act of Parliament
- Parliament of Great Britain
- Long title: An Act for dividing and enclosing the Open and Common Fields, Common Meadows, Common Ground, and Waste Ground, in the Manor and Parish of Helmdon, in the County of Northampton.
- Citation: 31 Geo. 2. c. 33 Pr.
- Territorial extent: Great Britain

Dates
- Royal assent: 9 June 1758
- Commencement: 1 December 1757 (Note: Start of session.)

Status: Current legislation

Traces of traditional ridge and furrow ploughing survive in much of the parish, and particularly in the south. They are evidence of the open field system of farming that prevailed in the parish until 1758, when Parliament passed an inclosure act for Helmdon, the Helmdon Inclosure Act 1757 (31 Geo. 2. c. 33 Pr.).

=== Leisure ===
A few 17th-century records name Helmdon victuallers in 1630, 1673 and 1692, but none says where there alehouses were or what they were called. Helmdon's earliest public house to be recorded by name was the Cross in Cross Lane. It was built late in the 17th century, and takes its name from the Cross family that ran it from then until late in the 18th century. Early in the 19th century Hopcroft and Norris's brewery in Brackley acquired it as a tied house. The Cross closed on 15 August 1914, just a fortnight after the outbreak of the First World War. It is now a private house called the Old Cross.

Publicans of the Cross included James Campin (in 1884–1909) and Edward Campin (in 1913), who share the same local surname as the stonemason William Campiun commemorated in the parish church in 1313. The last Campin in Helmdon died in 1969.

The Chequers opposite the parish school was trading by 1758 and possibly much earlier. In 1872 it was taken over by Hopcroft and Norris, which in 1945 merged with the Chesham Brewery to form the Chesham and Brackley Brewery. By 1960 it had passed to Phipps Northampton Brewery Company, which in 1970 sold it to Charles Wells Ltd of Bedford. It was closed in 1992, demolished and replaced by four new houses.

The King William IV was trading by 1841, just four years after the death of its namesake. In about 1884 it became a tied house of the Leamington Brewery Company and its name was changed to The Bell. After 1934 a dance hall with a sprung floor was built behind the pub. Also in the middle of the 20th century the Bell diversified as a filling station, with a single hand-operated petrol pump outside. The dance hall was demolished and replaced with a bungalow before 1970 but the petrol pump remained well into the 1970s. The Bell continues to trade today.

The Cock and Magpie in Wappenham Road opposite the Baptist chapel was trading by 1861. Its name was later shortened to the Magpie. When the Great Central Main Line was being built in the second half of the 1890s, the landlord added a wooden building behind the pub in which he lodged some of the navvies. The Magpie closed down in 1909, giving it the shortest trading life of Helmdon's four known pubs. It is now a private house, Magpie Cottage.

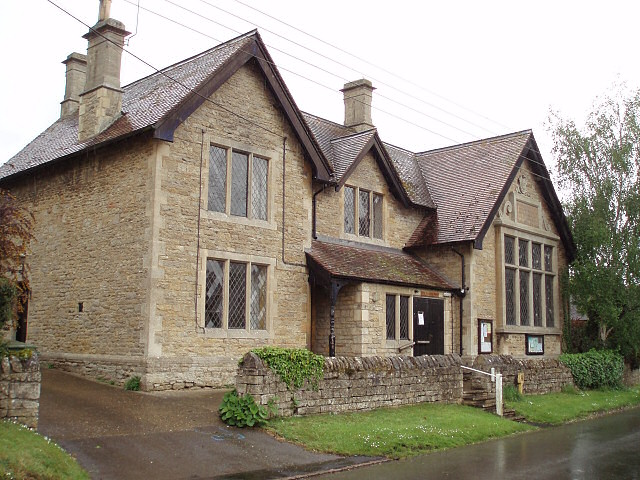
Helmdon Reading Room, built in 1887

A Charles Fairbrother had the Reading Room built in 1887 as a men's meeting place as an alternative to the pubs. Newspapers and magazines were donated and until 1930 a small annual subscription was charged. Women were not admitted until 1921, when the local Women's Institute started meeting there. It was run by the parish Rector and churchwardens until the 1970s, when it was transferred to the parish council. Throughout its history the Reading Room has been the meeting place of many of Helmdon's activities, serving in effect as the village hall.

=== School ===
Helmdon School was planned in 1852 as a National School and built and opened in 1853 on land given by Worcester College, Oxford. The original building included a house for the schoolmaster, which was sold as a private house in 1970. In 1872 more land was acquired and an additional classroom was built.

After Parliament passed the Elementary Education Act 1870, control of the school was transferred from the Church of England parish to the local School Board. The school was refurbished in 1933 and extended in 1975. It is now a primary school.

=== Railways ===
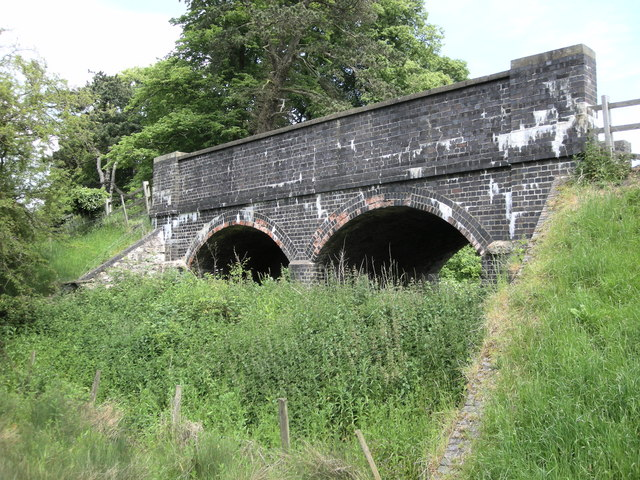
Bridge carrying Station Road over the dismantled Stratford-upon-Avon and Midland Junction Railway next to the site of the former SMJR station

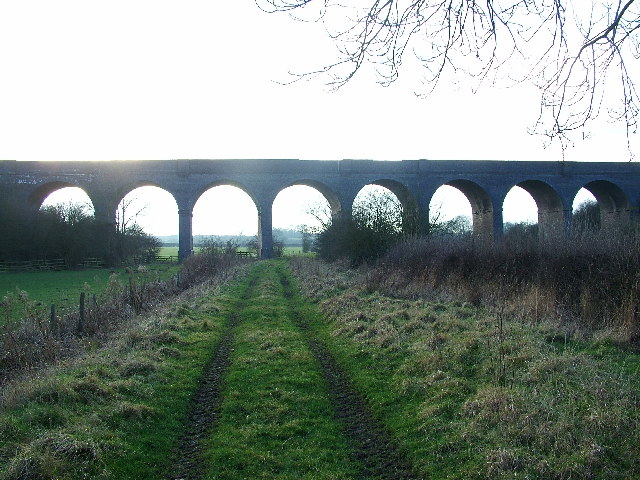
Helmdon Viaduct, part of the dismantled Great Central Main Line

In 1872 the Northampton and Banbury Junction Railway (from 1910 part of the Stratford-upon-Avon and Midland Junction Railway (SMJR)) was opened between Blisworth and Farthinghoe. It passed roughly east–west along the Tove Valley through the middle of the village, where its Helmdon station was opened.

In the 1890s a civil engineering contractor, Walter Scott and Company of Newcastle upon Tyne, built the section of the Great Central Main Line (GCML) between Woodford Halse and Brackley Central. From 1894 to 1898 Scott had a construction yard in the Tove Valley at Helmdon with a network of sidings connected to the SMJR. It was next to where the company built Helmdon Viaduct, a nine-arch structure of Staffordshire blue brick that carried the GCML main line across the valley.

The main line linked northern England with London Marylebone and opened in 1899. It ran roughly north–south through the parish, passing just west of the village. There the Great Central Railway (GCR) opened its own Helmdon station, causing some confusion with the SMJR's existing Helmdon station. In the 1920s Sulgrave Manor House, about 2 1/4 miles (4 km) from Helmdon, was restored as a museum to the family of George Washington, whose ancestors held that manor from 1540 to 1659. In response the London and North Eastern Railway, which had succeeded the GCR in 1923, renamed its main line station "Helmdon for Sulgrave" from 1928.

British Railways closed the SMJR station and line in 1951, the GCML main line station in 1963 and the main line in 1966. Helmdon Viaduct survives.

=== Shops ===
In the late 19th and early 20th centuries Helmdon a dozen or more shops. By the 1930s they included a post office, three grocers, a butcher, an egg-dealer, a fruiterer, a baker, a newsagent, a tailor and a shoe repairer. Other local tradesmen included two coal merchants, a wheelwright who also made coffins, a builder who was also the parish undertaker, and even a maker of boot polish. Butchers from Brackley and Syresham delivered to customers in Helmdon, and some Helmdon traders sold their goods beyond the parish. Helmdon's last village shop was Bungalow Stores in Station Road, which closed in 2011.

== Amenities ==
The Bell continues to trade as both a pub and an hotel. Helmdon has a nursery school for children aged 2–4 years as well as the primary school for children aged 4–11 years. There are more than 30 community groups. The village has two ponds, and a public park with play equipment and benches. Helmdon won the Northamptonshire Village of the Year competition in 1969, 1996, 1999, 2002 and 2011.

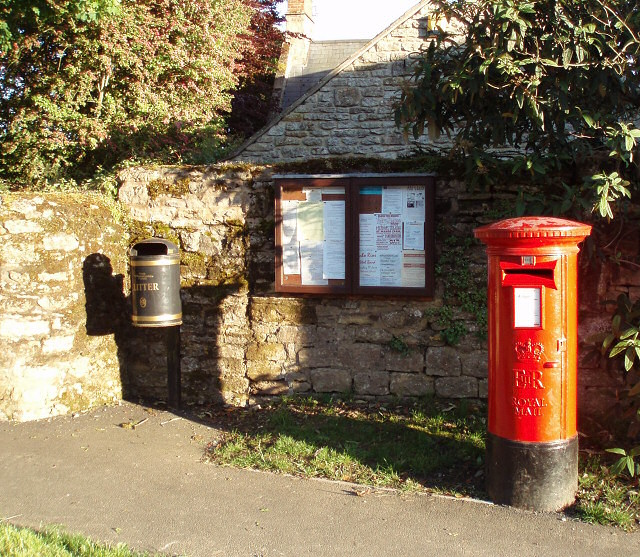
Pillar box and community noticeboard in the part of the village north of the River Tove

== Sources ==
- Adkins, W.R.D.; Serjeantson, R.M., eds. (1902). A History of the County of Northampton. Victoria County History. Vol. 1. Westminster: Archibald Constable & Co. pp. 322, 369.
- Anonymous (2011). Strategic Stone Study; a Building Stone Atlas of Northamptonshire. English Heritage. pp. 16–17.
- Arkell, W.J. (1948). "The building-stones of Blenheim Palace, Cornbury Park, Glympton Park and Heythrop House, Oxfordshire". Oxoniensia. XIII. Oxford Architectural and Historical Society: 49–54. ISSN 0308-5562.
- Boyd-Hope, Gary; Sargent, Andrew; Newton, Sydney (2007). Railways and Rural Life: S W A Newton and the Great Central Railway. Swindon: English Heritage and Leicestershire County Council. pp. 99–101. ISBN 978-185074-959-2.
- Harwood, Audrey (1997). "Lace Making in Helmdon". Aspects of Helmdon. 1.
- Harwood, Audrey (1998). "The Public Houses of Helmdon". Aspects of Helmdon. 2.
- Ipgrave, Geoff (1999). "Helmdon School". Aspects of Helmdon. 3: 116–145.
- Mawson, Kate; Moody, Danny (2001). "The Manorial History of Helmdon". Aspects of Helmdon. 4: 177–184.
- Moir, Valerie (1998). "Helmdon Enclosure Act". Aspects of Helmdon. 2.
- Parry, Edward (1986–87). "Helmdon Stone". Northamptonshire Past and Present. VII (4). Northamptonshire Record Society: 258–269.
- Parry, Edward (2008). "Helmdon Buildings - Continuity And Change". Aspects of Helmdon. 6.
- Pevsner, Nikolaus; Cherry, Bridget (1973) [1961]. Northamptonshire. The Buildings of England. Harmondsworth: Penguin Books. p. 253. ISBN 0-14-071022-1.
- RCHME, ed. (1982). "Helmdon". An Inventory of the Historical Monuments in the County of Northamptonshire. Vol. 4 – Archaeological sites in South-West Northamptonshire. London: Royal Commission on the Historical Monuments of England. pp. 80–88.
- Serjeantson, R.M.; Adkins, W.R.D., eds. (1906). "The Hospital of St. John Baptist and St. John Evangelist, Northampton". A History of the County of Northampton. Victoria County History. Vol. 2. Westminster: Archibald Constable & Co. pp. 156–159.
- Vicars, Ross (2005). "Shops in Helmdon". Aspects of Helmdon. 5.
