= Brackley Central railway station =

Disused railway station in Northamptonshire, England

Coordinates: 52.03726°N 1.13983°W

Brackley Central
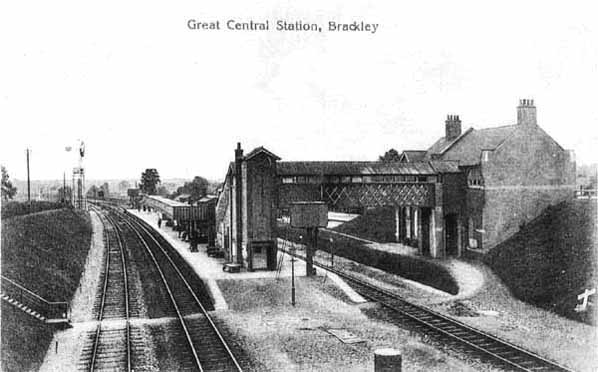

General information
- Location: Brackley, West Northamptonshire, England
- Grid reference: SP591380
- Platforms: 2

Other information
- Status: Disused

History
- Original company: Great Central Railway
- Pre-grouping: Great Central Railway
- Post-grouping: London and North Eastern Railway, London Midland Region of British Railways

Key dates
- 15 March 1899: Opened
- 5 September 1966: Closed
Location

Brackley Central was one of two railway stations that served the town of Brackley, in Northamptonshire, England. It was a stop on the former Great Central Main Line, which ran from Manchester London Road to London Marylebone, the last main line to be built from the north of England to London.

== History ==
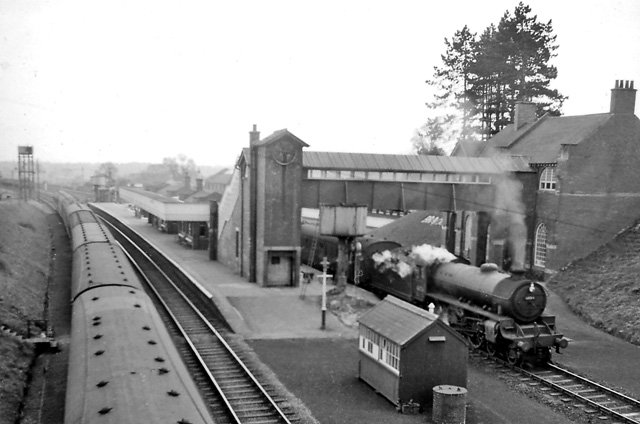
Brackley Central in 1961

The station opened when passenger services commenced on 15 March 1899 and was the second station in the town, following the London and North Western Railway's (LNWR) facility, which was known simply as Brackley. The Great Central Railway's London Extension was a victim of the Beeching Axe, as it was seen as a duplicate of the Midland Main Line. After a period of rundown, with lesser stations closing first, the section between Aylesbury and Rugby Central, including Brackley Central, was closed to all traffic on 5 September 1966. The former LNWR line had closed a few years earlier.

== Layout ==
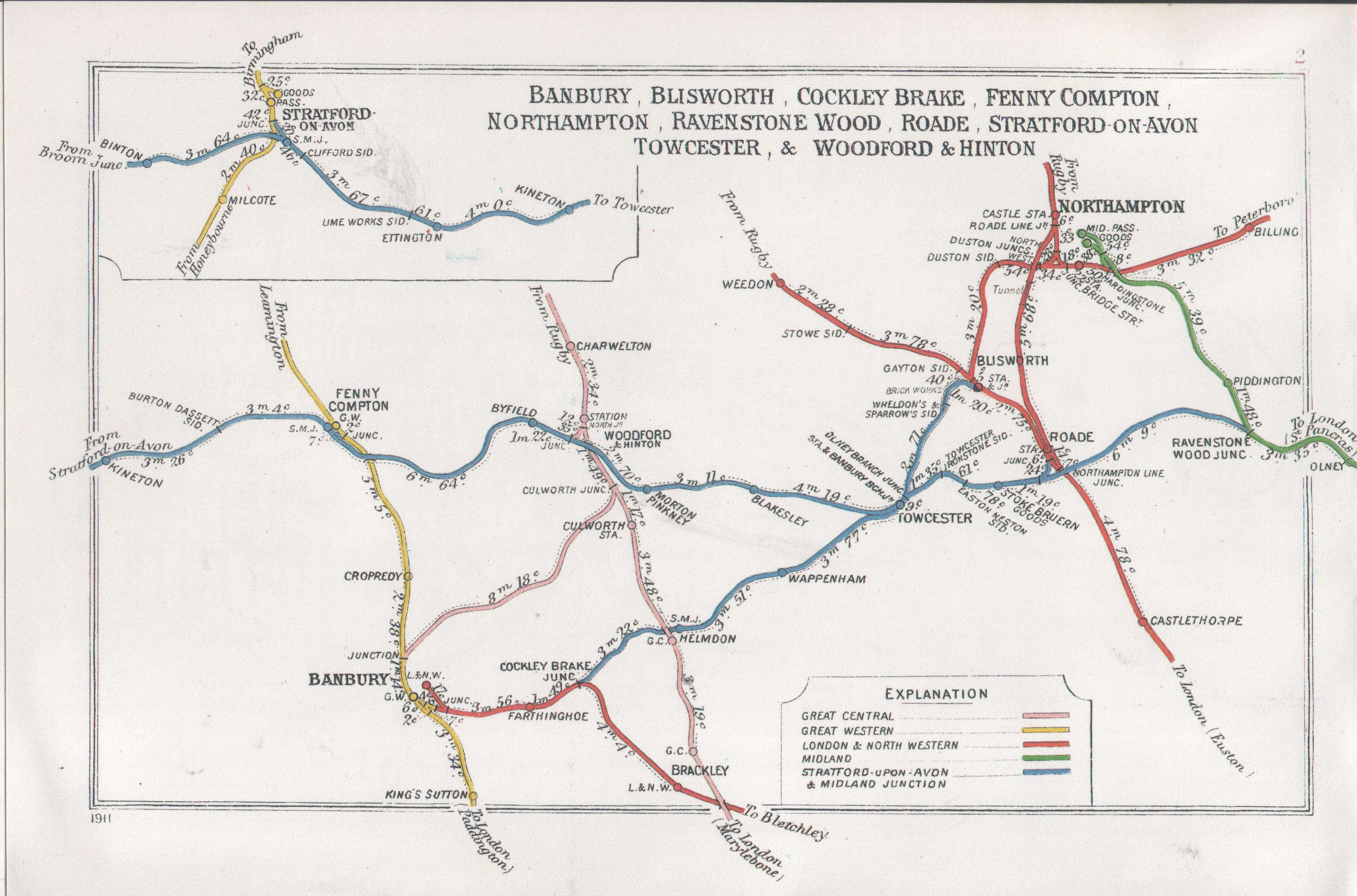
A 1911 Railway Clearing House map of railways in the vicinity of Brackley (lower centre; Brackley Central is in pink labelled "G.C.")

The station was a variation on the standard island platform design typical of the London Extension; here it was the more common "cutting" type reached from a roadway (the A43) that crossed over the line. The cutting itself was substantial and typical of the line, involving the excavation of some 336,000 cubic yards (256,892 cubic metres) of material. The original intention was for the station entrance to be located on the bridge itself, as it was at numerous other stations on the line, but local concerns about traffic congestion forced a change in the layout, the entrance being relocated at the top of the cutting on the west side in a lay-by off the road, with a footbridge leading across to the platform (Hucknall Central had a similar arrangement, only there the entrance was on the east side). Although the town of Brackley had a population of barely 2,500 at the time, it was considered a sufficiently large and important settlement for the station to be provided with a more extensive range of platform buildings and facilities beneath a longer awning, as at Woodford Halse and Rugby Central.

Many myths surround construction, one being that Brackley was to house a locomotive depot and workshops.

== The unbuilt Northampton branch ==
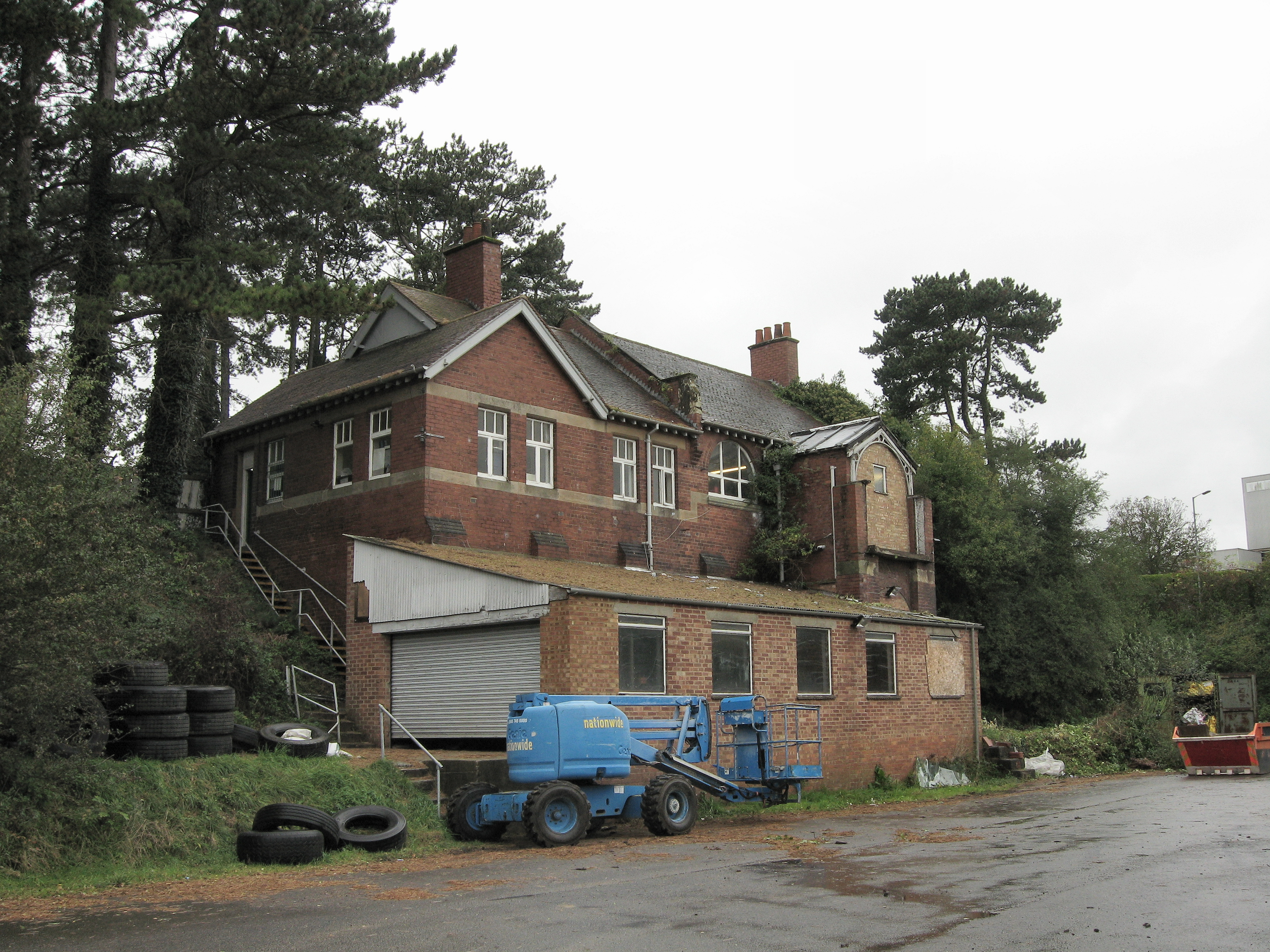
Brackley Central station on the platform side in October 2008, showing that what appears to be the ground floor from the approach road. It is actually the upper floor of a two-storey building. At the far (north) end of the building can be seen the bricked up remains of the footbridge that led to the platform, while the grassy bank bottom left is a surviving remnant of the unfinished Northampton branch platform.

The article's leading photograph of the station (dated 1906) is interesting in that it shows, on the right hand (west) side, a third platform under construction. The story is somewhat shrouded in myth but according to legend the Great Central had visions of building a branch line from Brackley via Towcester to Northampton, but never got the go-ahead; indeed, no Bill was ever presented to Parliament. Nevertheless, the branch platform was commenced anyway, but never got beyond the stage shown. Its position is a puzzle also in that it appears to be located on the "wrong side" of the station, since Northampton-bound trains would have had to cross the main running lines in order to access the branch.

== Brackley Viaduct ==
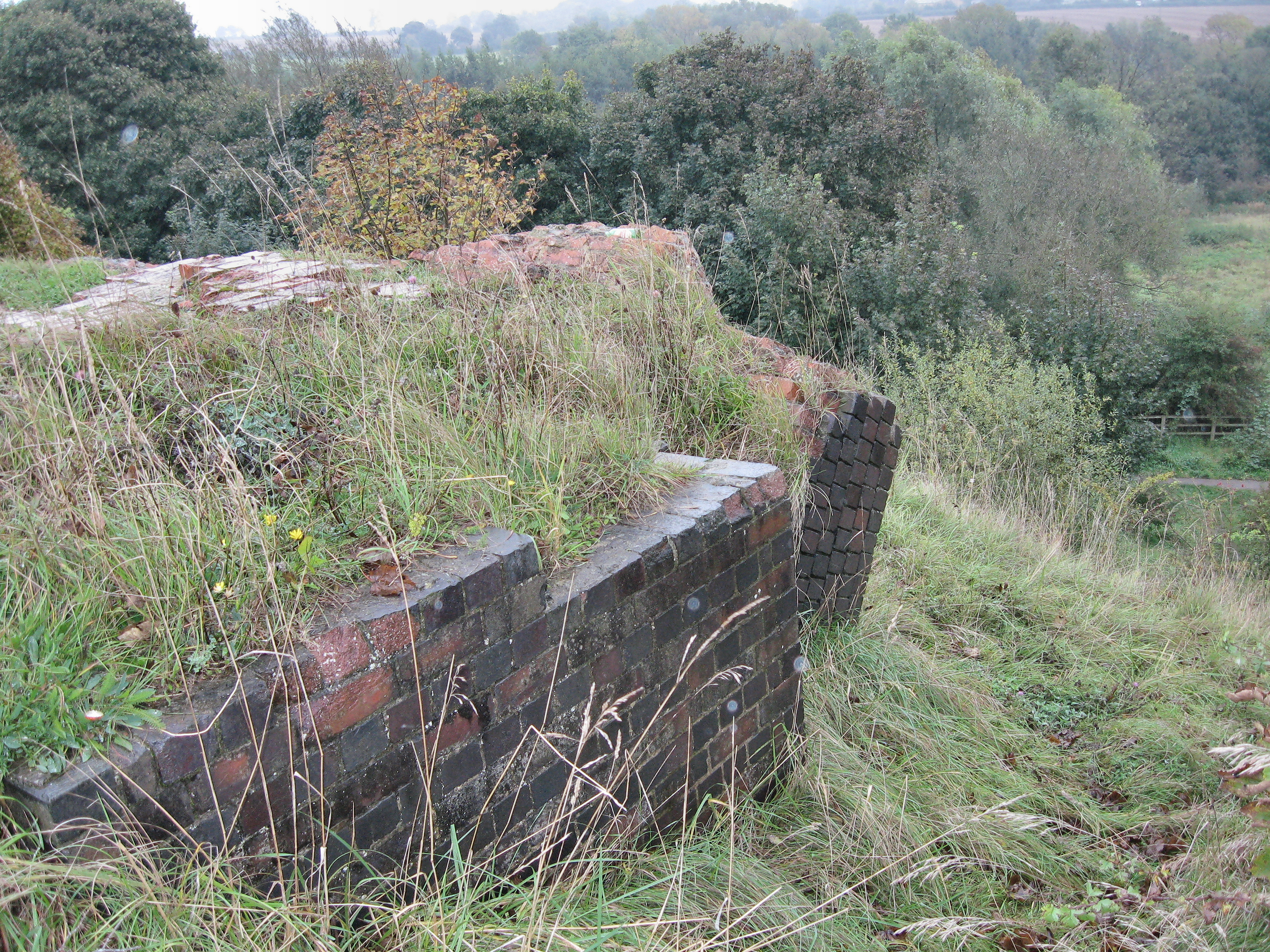
All that remained of the viaduct in October 2008, showing the springing of the northernmost arch.

A little way to the south the ground level fell away rapidly so that the line found itself on a high embankment leading to Brackley Viaduct. This impressive structure, which spanned the Ouse Valley, was 255 yards (233 metres) in length, 62 feet (19 metres) high and started out with 22 blue brick arches each of 34 feet 3 inches (10.44 metres). However, due to movement of clay beds beneath the south end of the structure when it was almost complete, cracks were noticed in the southernmost two arches; these were replaced by two girder spans each of 35 feet (11 metres), while the third arch was filled with bricks to provide a massive buttress. Meanwhile, the third arch from the north end was walled up to provide extra bracing there.

== The site today ==
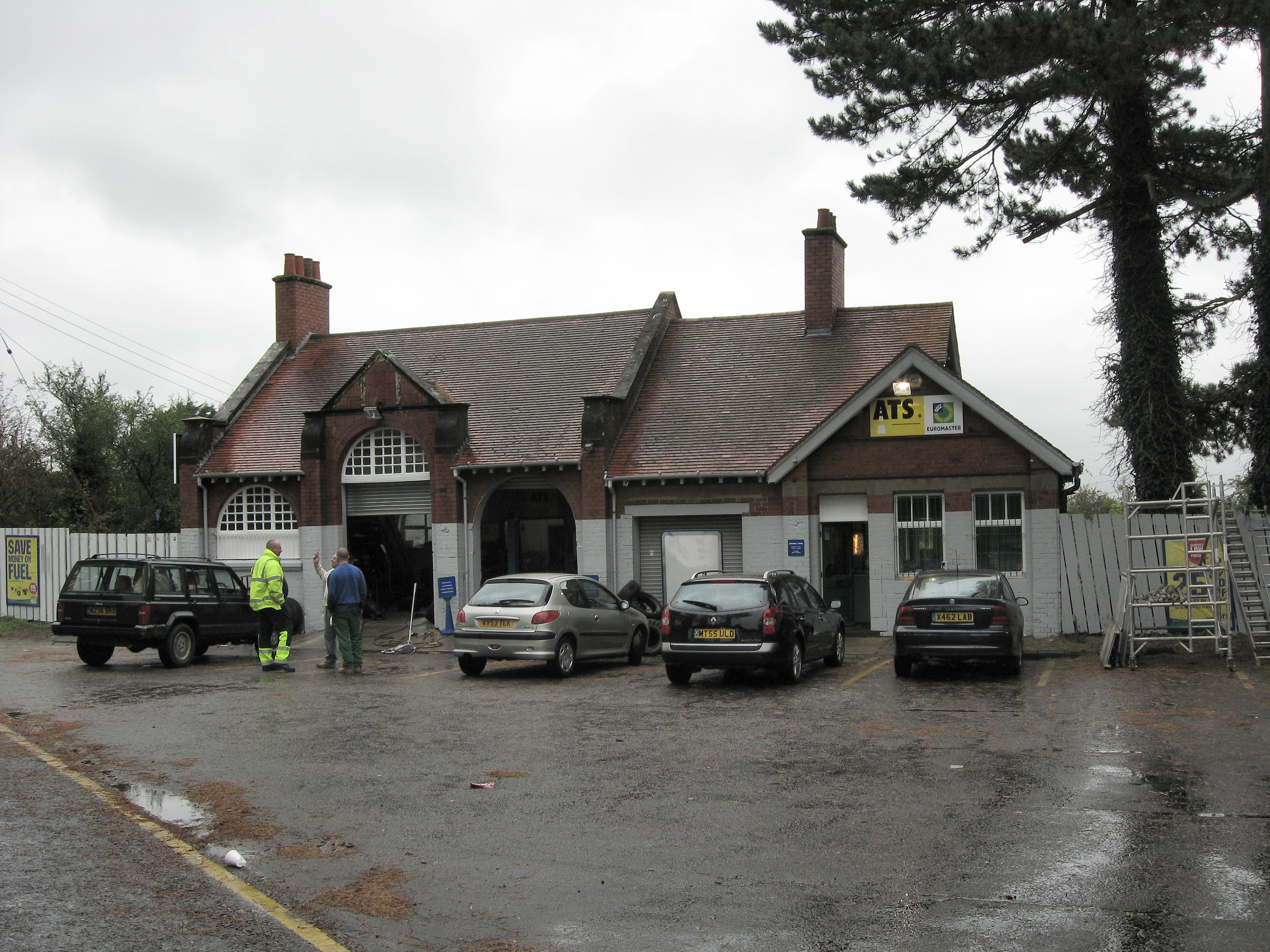
Brackley Central station forecourt in October 2008; the building is now used by a tyre firm

The entrance building at road level still stands and was, most recently, occupied by a cafe called Brackley Central. In April 2024, the café closed and the building with 1.13 acres of surrounding land was for sale. Down in the cutting the platform and its buildings have gone, replaced by a range of industrial units. Improvements to the A43 following the line's closure meant that the bridge carrying the road over the line was demolished and the cutting partially filled in at that point. To the south, the viaduct was demolished in sections in the spring and summer of 1978, the rubble was reused as hardcore beneath new roads in Milton Keynes.

In July 2025, a battery-converted Class 08 locomotive (08649) arrived for temporary storage in the area that was previously occupied by the station platform.

== Future ==
Chiltern Railways, the rail operator between London and Aylesbury, has suggested that its long-term ambition is to open up the GCML beyond Rugby. This ambition is incorporated into Chiltern's franchise agreement, which identifies the reopening of the GCML between Aylesbury (or Calvert in the event that the Varsity Line is partially reopened) and Leicester is a "secondary aspiration" of Chiltern's franchise. This would include a new parkway station at Brackley and near the intersection of the M1 and M6 motorways north of Rugby.

In January 2008, the Secretary of State for Transport, Ruth Kelly, confirmed in a statement to the House of Commons that she had an "open mind" as to whether, during the second control period from 2014, "a disused rail line between London and Birmingham" should be reopened as a means of relieving the West Coast Main Line, which was interpreted by rail commentators as referring to the GCML.

Preceding station	Disused railways	Following station
Finmere; Line and station closed	Great Central Railway; London Extension	Helmdon; Line and station closed
