= Grade II* listed buildings in South Northamptonshire =

There are more than 20,000 Grade II* listed buildings in England. This page is a list of these buildings in the former district of South Northamptonshire in Northamptonshire, now part of the unitary authority area of West Northamptonshire.

== South Northamptonshire ==
Name	Location	Type	Completed (Note: The date given is the date used by Historic England as significant for the initial building or that of an important part in the structure's description.)	Date designated	Grid ref. (Note: Sometimes known as OSGB36, the grid reference is based on the British national grid reference system used by the Ordnance Survey.) Geo-coordinates	Entry number (Note: The "List Entry Number" is a unique number assigned to each listed building and scheduled monument by Historic England.)	Image
Adstone House and attached Garden Wall	Adstone, South Northamptonshire	House	Mid to late 17th century	1 December 1951	SP5942851530; 52°09′32″N 1°07′58″W	1040930	Upload Photo
Church of St Margaret	Alderton	Church	Late Perpendicular	17 May 1960	SP7404746909; 52°06′56″N 0°55′12″W	1190752	Church of St Margaret More images
Church of St Michael and All Angels	Ashton	Church	14th century	3 May 1968	SP7652449977; 52°08′34″N 0°52′59″W	1190600	Church of St Michael and All Angels More images
6 Round Town	Aynho	House	Late 15th century	4 February 1969	SP5141133170; 51°59′41″N 1°15′09″W	1192400	6 Round Town
Church of St Mary	Blakesley	Church	c. 1300	17 May 1960	SP6270550471; 52°08′56″N 1°05′06″W	1371622	Church of St Mary More images
Priory Farmhouse	Blakesley	Farmhouse	15th century	1 December 1951	SP6265350454; 52°08′56″N 1°05′09″W	1040897	Upload Photo
Church of St John the Baptist	Blisworth	Church	13th century	17 May 1960	SP7252953410; 52°10′27″N 0°56′27″W	1371587	Church of St John the Baptist More images
Stoneacre	Blisworth	House	Early-mid 17th century	1 December 1951	SP7278753579; 52°10′32″N 0°56′13″W	1189162	Stoneacre More images
Brackley Lodge (including Gate Piers)	Brackley	House	Early 18th century	22 April 1950	SP5852737018; 52°01′43″N 1°08′54″W	1189911	Brackley Lodge (including Gate Piers) More images
Magdalen College Chapel of Saints John and James	Brackley	School chapel	12th century	22 April 1950	SP5859837003; 52°01′42″N 1°08′50″W	1040573	Magdalen College Chapel of Saints John and James More images
Town Hall	Brackley	Town Hall	1705-6	22 April 1950	SP5843536809; 52°01′36″N 1°08′59″W	1190100	Town Hall More images
82–88 High Street	Brackley	Almshouse	1633	22 April 1950	SP5881437473; 52°01′57″N 1°08′39″W	1371804	Upload Photo
Church of St Michael	Bradden	Church	13th century	14 December 1987	SP6473748522; 52°07′52″N 1°03′20″W	1294406	Church of St Michael More images
Church of St Lawrence	Brafield on the Green	Church	12th century	3 May 1968	SP8221559060; 52°13′25″N 0°47′52″W	1041597	Church of St Lawrence More images
Church of St Michael and All Angels	Bugbrooke	Parish Church	C13-C15	3 May 1968	SP6740057311; 52°12′36″N 1°00′54″W	1041055	Church of St Michael and All Angels More images
The Dower House	Bugbrooke	House	Late 17th century	3 May 1968	SP6776157078; 52°12′28″N 1°00′35″W	1190311	Upload Photo
Terrace Gardens	Castle Ashby Park, Castle Ashby	Gate	1864	6 September 1988	SP8639459225; 52°13′28″N 0°44′12″W	1189676	Upload Photo
The Menagerie	Castle Ashby Park, Castle Ashby	House	1761–74	3 May 1968	SP8683059378; 52°13′33″N 0°43′49″W	1189885	Upload Photo
Chacombe Priory	Chacombe	Country House	16th century	11 September 1953	SP4885143887; 52°05′28″N 1°17′18″W	1041228	Chacombe Priory More images
The Manor House	Chipping Warden and Edgcote	Manor House	16th century	4 February 1969	SP4995748779; 52°08′06″N 1°16′18″W	1293906	Upload Photo
Church of St Peter	Cogenhoe, Cogenhoe and Whiston	Church	13th century	3 May 1968	SP8301961045; 52°14′29″N 0°47′08″W	1041575	Church of St Peter More images
Church of St Luke	Cold Higham	Parish Church	13th century	17 May 1960	SP6627053513; 52°10′33″N 1°01′56″W	1190319	Church of St Luke More images
Bridge Number 65	Grand Union Canal, Cosgrove	Canal Bridge	c. 1800	1 December 1951	SP7928942742; 52°04′39″N 0°50′40″W	1190608	Bridge Number 65 More images
Church of St Peter and St Paul	Courteenhall	Church	C13-C17	3 May 1968	SP7644952928; 52°10′10″N 0°53′01″W	1040983	Church of St Peter and St Paul More images
Courteenhall House and attached Offices	Courteenhall	Country House	1791-3	23 August 1955	SP7614053132; 52°10′16″N 0°53′17″W	1189193	Courteenhall House and attached Offices More images
Courteenhall House Stable Block and attached Coach Houses, Stables and Barn	Courteenhall	Stables	Mid 18th century	23 August 1955	SP7609652966; 52°10′11″N 0°53′20″W	1371591	Upload Photo
The School and School House	Courteenhall	House	C20	3 May 1968	SP7590353130; 52°10′16″N 0°53′30″W	1040984	Upload Photo
Church of St Mary	Culworth	Church	Early 13th century	4 February 1969	SP5443546940; 52°07′05″N 1°12′23″W	1189875	Church of St Mary More images
Wall, Gatepiers and Gateway about 20m south of Church of St Mary	Culworth	Gate	C18/C19	4 July 1985	SP5443646919; 52°07′05″N 1°12′23″W	1040493	Upload Photo
Church of St Margaret of Antioch	Denton	Anchorite Cell	13th century	3 May 1968	SP8379657983; 52°12′49″N 0°46′30″W	1041584	Church of St Margaret of Antioch More images
Church of St Nicholas	Eydon	Church	13th century	4 February 1969	SP5411249981; 52°08′44″N 1°12′38″W	1040476	Church of St Nicholas More images
Abbey Lodge	Farthinghoe	House	15th century	4 February 1969	SP5358439791; 52°03′14″N 1°13′12″W	1286510	Upload Photo
Church of St Mary the Virgin	Gayton	Parish Church	14th century	17 May 1960	SP7060254791; 52°11′13″N 0°58′07″W	1041071	Church of St Mary the Virgin More images
Church of St Mary the Virgin	Grafton Regis	Church	Early 13th century	17 May 1960	SP7589246922; 52°06′56″N 0°53′35″W	1040819	Church of St Mary the Virgin More images
The Chantry	Grafton Regis	House	17th century	1 December 1951	SP7587046854; 52°06′53″N 0°53′36″W	1040820	Upload Photo
Church of St Peter	Greatworth	Parish Church	13th century	18 March 1985	SP5523642382; 52°04′37″N 1°11′44″W	1192679	Church of St Peter More images
Pair of Headstones about 5m south-west of South Porch of Church of St Peter	Greatworth	Gravestone	Late 18th century	18 March 1985	SP5523342372; 52°04′37″N 1°11′44″W	1371828	Upload Photo
Church of St John the Baptist	Piddington, Hackleton	Church	13th century	3 May 1968	SP8008954601; 52°11′02″N 0°49′48″W	1190138	Church of St John the Baptist More images
Church of St Mary	Horton, Hackleton	Church	13th century	3 May 1968	SP8194154336; 52°10′52″N 0°48′11″W	1190174	Church of St Mary More images
Church of St Peter and St Paul	Preston Deanery, Hackleton	Church	12th century	3 May 1968	SP7884255679; 52°11′37″N 0°50′53″W	1041557	Church of St Peter and St Paul More images
The Menagerie	Horton, Hackleton	Gate	Late 1750s	3 May 1968	SP8227053472; 52°10′24″N 0°47′54″W	1041554	The Menagerie More images
Church of All Saints	Harpole	Parish Church	C12-C15	3 May 1968	SP6906160965; 52°14′33″N 0°59′24″W	1041038	Church of All Saints More images
Church of St John the Baptist	Hartwell	Church	Medieval	3 May 1968	SP7852650430; 52°08′48″N 0°51′14″W	1040826	Church of St John the Baptist More images
Astwell Castle	Helmdon	Manor House	15th century	11 September 1953	SP6079444072; 52°05′30″N 1°06′51″W	1041132	Astwell Castle More images
Church of St Mary Magdalene	Helmdon	Church	14th century	9 February 1969	SP5901143186; 52°05′02″N 1°08′25″W	1371508	Church of St Mary Magdalene More images
Astrop House	Astrop, Kings Sutton	House	c. 1740	31 August 1960	SP5087836794; 52°01′38″N 1°15′36″W	1226127	Astrop House More images
Manor House	Kings Sutton	House	Early 17th century	11 September 1953	SP4979636051; 52°01′14″N 1°16′33″W	1226232	Manor House
The Courthouse	Kings Sutton	House	Late 16th century	4 February 1969	SP4986536065; 52°01′15″N 1°16′29″W	1226138	Upload Photo
Church of St Martin	Litchborough	Parish Church	13th century	17 May 1960	SP6326654257; 52°10′59″N 1°04′34″W	1371572	Church of St Martin More images
Church of St Mary the Virgin	Little Houghton	Church	C13-C15	3 May 1968	SP8034059629; 52°13′44″N 0°49′31″W	1041558	Church of St Mary the Virgin More images
Little Houghton House and attached Office Wing	Little Houghton	House	c. 1825	6 September 1988	SP8054659688; 52°13′46″N 0°49′20″W	1190269	Little Houghton House and attached Office Wing More images
Church of St Peter and St Paul	Maidford	Church	13th century	17 May 1960	SP6097052539; 52°10′04″N 1°06′36″W	1371650	Church of St Peter and St Paul More images
Marston House	Marston St. Lawrence	Country House	C16-C17	11 September 1953	SP5368342180; 52°04′31″N 1°13′05″W	1371491	Upload Photo
Church of the Holy Cross	Milton Malsor	Church	Late 13th century to mid 14th century	3 May 1968	SP7366955558; 52°11′36″N 0°55′25″W	1040957	Church of the Holy Cross More images
Church of St Mary	Moreton Pinkney	Church	Late 12th century	4 February 1969	SP5740249052; 52°08′12″N 1°09′46″W	1293734	Church of St Mary More images
Church of St Peter and St Paul	Nether Heyford	Parish Church	13th century	3 May 1968	SP6596058714; 52°13′22″N 1°02′09″W	1041021	Church of St Peter and St Paul More images
Church of St James	Newbottle	Church	1764	4 February 1969	SP5236136915; 52°01′41″N 1°14′18″W	1265911	Church of St James More images
Manor House	Great Purston, Newbottle	Manor House	16th century	4 February 1969	SP5176139514; 52°03′06″N 1°14′48″W	1226244	Manor House More images
Manor House	Newbottle	Manor House	Early 16th century	11 September 1953	SP5237836961; 52°01′43″N 1°14′17″W	1226294	Upload Photo
Church of Holy Cross	Pattishall	Parish Church	C11-C15	17 May 1960	SP6711354295; 52°10′58″N 1°01′11″W	1371539	Church of Holy Cross More images
Church of St James the Great	Paulerspury	Church	13th century	17 May 1960	SP7156845496; 52°06′11″N 0°57′24″W	1041108	Church of St James the Great More images
Church of St Bartholomew	Furtho, Potterspury	Church	12th century	17 June 1960	SP7734343088; 52°04′51″N 0°52′22″W	1191073	Church of St Bartholomew More images
Dovecote at Manor Farm	Furtho, Potterspury	Dovecote	Late 15th century	18 May 1988	SP7729943028; 52°04′49″N 0°52′24″W	1041652	Dovecote at Manor Farm More images
Stable Block at Wakefield Lodge and attached Walls, Outbuildings and Gatepiers	Potterspury	House	Mid 18th century	1 December 1951	SP7384142506; 52°04′34″N 0°55′26″W	1190683	Upload Photo
Wakefield Lodge	Potterspury	Country House	1748–1750	1 December 1951	SP7375242550; 52°04′35″N 0°55′31″W	1371656	Wakefield Lodge More images
Church of St John the Baptist	Quinton	Church	Late Norman	3 May 1968	SP7767654330; 52°10′54″N 0°51′55″W	1371303	Church of St John the Baptist More images
Church of St Mary the Virgin	Roade	Church Hall	1972	3 May 1968	SP7573951867; 52°09′36″N 0°53′39″W	1294257	Church of St Mary the Virgin More images
Church of St Peter and St Paul	Rothersthorpe	Parish Church	13th century	3 May 1968	SP7133456664; 52°12′11″N 0°57′22″W	1191724	Church of St Peter and St Paul More images
East Pavilion and attached Quadrant Colonnade	Stoke Park, Stoke Bruerne	House	c1629-35	1 December 1951	SP7410948773; 52°07′56″N 0°55′07″W	1040911	East Pavilion and attached Quadrant Colonnade
West Pavilion and attached Quadrant Colonnade	Stoke Park, Shutlanger	Pavilion	c1629-35	1 December 1951	SP7406648726; 52°07′55″N 0°55′10″W	1371608	West Pavilion and attached Quadrant Colonnade
Church of St Mary the Virgin	Stoke Bruerne	Church	Late 12th century	17 May 1960	SP7406849838; 52°08′31″N 0°55′09″W	1040946	Church of St Mary the Virgin More images
Church of St James	Sulgrave	Church	Late Saxon	4 February 1969	SP5569045342; 52°06′13″N 1°11′18″W	1040418	Church of St James More images
Church of St James	Syresham	Church	13th century	4 February 1969	SP6309041964; 52°04′21″N 1°04′51″W	1190438	Church of St James More images
Manor House	Thorpe Mandeville	Manor House	Early 18th century	11 September 1953	SP5331444965; 52°06′02″N 1°13′23″W	1041127	Upload Photo
Church of St John the Baptist	Tiffield	Church	13th century	17 May 1960	SP6991751629; 52°09′31″N 0°58′46″W	1040916	Church of St John the Baptist More images
No 88 Watling St East (the Chantry House) and attached Forecourt Walls and Gateway	Towcester	House	15th century	1 August 1979	SP6935648684; 52°07′56″N 0°59′17″W	1189997	No 88 Watling St East (the Chantry House) and attached Forecourt Walls and Gateway More images
Park Farmhouse	Handley, Towcester	Farmhouse	1601	19 August 1976	SP6732447102; 52°07′05″N 1°01′05″W	1189876	Upload Photo
157 Watling Street West	Towcester	House	Mid 18th century	1 December 1951	SP6936248581; 52°07′52″N 0°59′17″W	1040834	Upload Photo
Church of St Mary	Wappenham	Church	13th century	17 May 1960	SP6250045666; 52°06′21″N 1°05′20″W	1190507	Church of St Mary More images
The Laurels	Wappenham	Farmhouse	Early 18th century	1 December 1951	SP6269145747; 52°06′23″N 1°05′10″W	1293793	Upload Photo
The Manor	Wappenham	Manor House	1702	1 December 1951	SP6246645682; 52°06′21″N 1°05′22″W	1190469	Upload Photo
Church of St Mary	Warkworth	Church	14th century	4 February 1969	SP4865140719; 52°03′46″N 1°17′30″W	1226297	Church of St Mary More images
Church of St Mary	Weedon Lois, Weston and Weedon	Church	c. 1100	17 May 1960	SP6016046979; 52°07′04″N 1°07′22″W	1371888	Church of St Mary More images
Manor House Farmhouse, Outbuilding and Garden Wall	Plumpton, Weston and Weedon	Farmhouse	Early 17th century	1 December 1951	SP5991048433; 52°07′51″N 1°07′34″W	1293468	Upload Photo
Weston Hall	Weston, Weston and Weedon	House	Late 17th century	4 July 1985	SP5913446916; 52°07′03″N 1°08′16″W	1040401	Weston Hall More images
Church of St Mary	Whittlebury	Church	13th century	17 May 1960	SP6896044230; 52°05′32″N 0°59′41″W	1371529	Church of St Mary More images
Church of St John the Evangelist	Wicken	Church	Medieval	17 May 1960	SP7451139500; 52°02′56″N 0°54′54″W	1371267	Church of St John the Evangelist More images
Wicken Country Hotel	Wicken	Country House	1703	1 December 1951	SP7431539465; 52°02′55″N 0°55′04″W	1041624	Upload Photo
Manor House and attached Walls	Woodend	Manor House	Late 17th century	1 December 1951	SP6158049311; 52°08′19″N 1°06′06″W	1190155	Manor House and attached Walls More images
Church of St Andrew	Yardley Hastings	Church	13th century	3 May 1968	SP8661657063; 52°12′18″N 0°44′02″W	1041535	Church of St Andrew More images
The Old Rectory	Yardley Hastings	House	1935	3 May 1968	SP8642057323; 52°12′27″N 0°44′12″W	1041541	Upload Photo
