= Nicholas Wilson, Lord Wilson of Culworth =

British Supreme Court judge (born 1945)

The Right Honourable Lord Wilson of Culworth PC
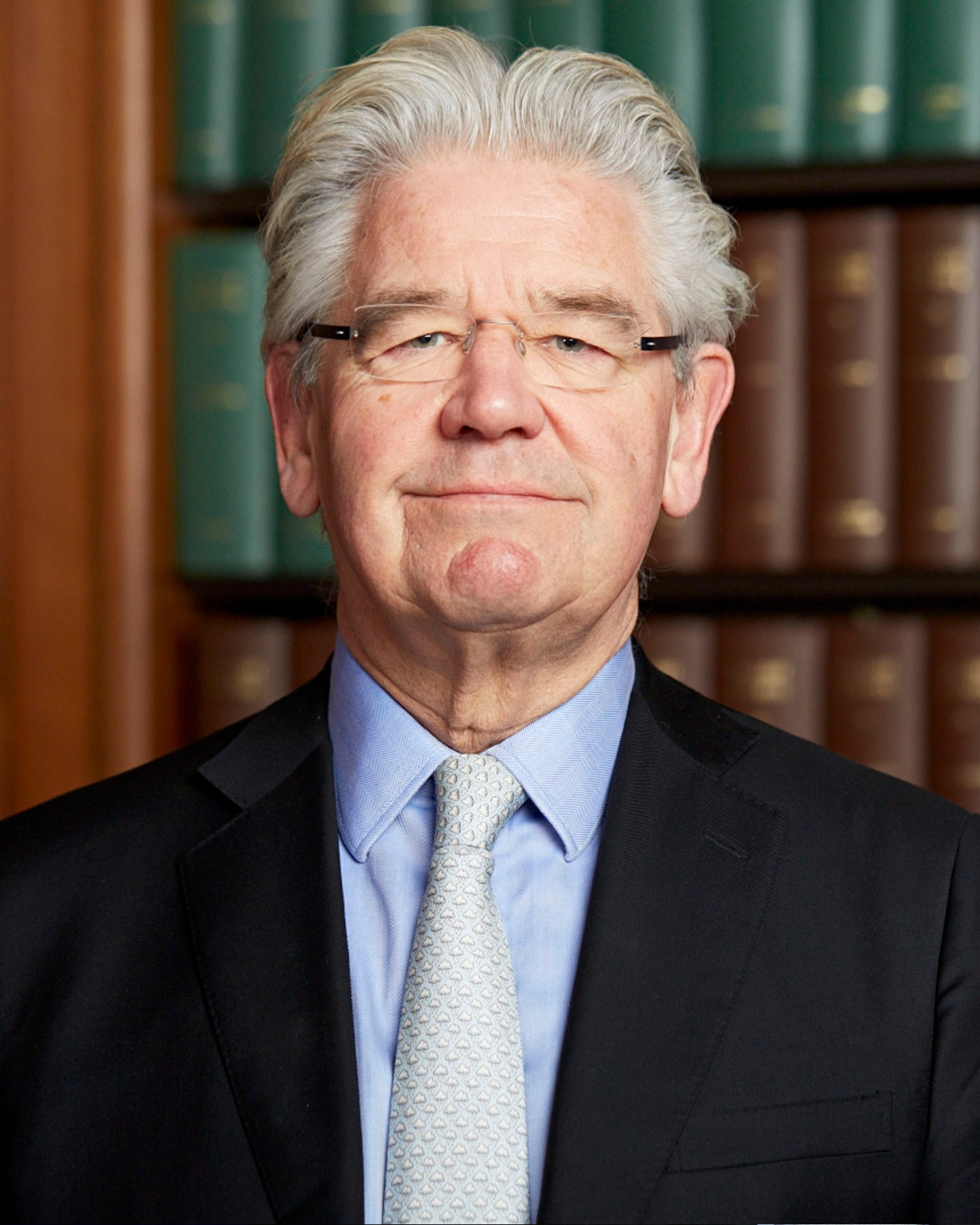

Justice of the Supreme Court of the United Kingdom
- In office 26 May 2011 – 9 May 2020
- Nominated by: Kenneth Clarke
- Appointed by: Elizabeth II
- Preceded by: The Lord Saville of Newdigate
- Succeeded by: Lord Burrows

Lord Justice of Appeal
- In office 3 October 2005 – 26 May 2011

High Court Judge
- In office 20 April 1993 – 3 October 2005

Personal details
- Born: 9 May 1945 (age 80)
- Spouse: Margaret Higgins (m. 1974)
- Education: Bryanston School
- Alma mater: Worcester College, Oxford

Nicholas Allan Roy Wilson, Lord Wilson of Culworth, PC (born 9 May 1945) is a retired British judge. On 26 May 2011, he became a Justice of the Supreme Court of the United Kingdom, having previously served as a Lord Justice of Appeal since 2005. Lord Wilson has specialised in family law throughout his career. In December 2016, as one of the 11 Justices of the Supreme Court, Lord Wilson heard the Government's appeal of R (Miller) v Secretary of State for Exiting the European Union (the Article 50 case) on the use of prerogative powers to start the process of leaving the European Union following the referendum on 23 June 2016.

== Early life ==
Lord Wilson's father was Roderick Peter Garrett Wilson (1913–1994), a former naval officer, who taught languages at Dartmouth Naval College after resigning his commission due to ill-health. In 1942 Peter married Anne Dorothy Anne Chenevix Trench (b 30 August 1916 in India), daughter of an officer in the Royal Engineers. As her husband's health continued to decline, Anne studied at Trinity College of Music, qualifying to teach the piano, to earn an income. The Wilsons lived in Fittleworth, Sussex for many years, purchasing Three Chimneys in the village in 1958.

His paternal grandfather was Sir Roderick Roy Wilson (10 August 1876 – 27 August 1942), a banker and politician who was Conservative MP for Lichfield (29 October 1924 to May 1929). He was knighted in 1929 and Chairman of the British Guiana Parliamentary Commission, 1926.

Lord Wilson was educated at Bryanston School, Dorset and Worcester College, Oxford.

== Career ==
Lord Wilson was called to the Bar in 1967 (Inner Temple), and became a Queen's Counsel in 1987. He was appointed a Recorder the same year. In 1993 he became a bencher and was appointed to the High Court, sitting in the Family Division, and was appointed a knight bachelor. He was appointed to the Court of Appeal in 2005 and was also appointed to the Privy Council. On 26 May 2011 he joined the Supreme Court of the United Kingdom, succeeding Lord Saville of Newdigate

By Royal Warrant all members of the Supreme Court, even if they do not hold a peerage, are entitled to the judicial style and title "Lord" for life. Wilson was granted the courtesy style Lord Wilson of Culworth, referencing Culworth, Northamptonshire. Lord Wilson of Culworth was the first person to use a territorial name with his judicial courtesy title.

== Personal life ==
Lord Wilson married Margaret Higgins, daughter of Reginald Francis Higgins, in 1974. After reading law at Oxford (MA 1966), Lady Wilson was called to the Bar in July 1966 by Middle Temple; admitted to Inner Temple in 1968 entitled to practice as a Barrister-at-Law. She worked at 3 Hare Court, London from 1967 to 1986 and ceased practice in 1987. For twenty years she was a chairman of the London leasehold valuation tribunal, and latterly a Judge of the successor First-tier Tribunal (Property Chamber), until she retired in April 2015 and became a mediator at Tanfield Chambers.

Lord and Lady Wilson have two children, Matthew Roderick Benjamin Wilson, born in 1977, and Camilla Jessica Wilson, born in 1981. Matthew attended Eton College where he edited the Eton Chronicle. Lord Wilson has told the story of asking his former client Rolling Stone Bill Wyman to do him favour and give Matthew an interview. "My son Matthew was once editor of the Eton Chronicle, and I said I have a real favour of you Bill, would you be prepared for my son to interview you on behalf of the Eton Chronicle – he said yes, come down next week. So Matthew went down and came back that evening – I asked him how it went and he said fine – I said 'let's hear it, come on' – and none of it had taken! And so I rang up Bill Wyman who said don't worry, let him come down again tomorrow and we’ll do it all over again – wasn't that wonderful?"

He has been a successful owner of hurdlers and steeplechasers, most trained by John Upson at Maidford in Northamptonshire. Winners in Lord Wilson's colours include Nick The Beak, Young Radical and Gritti Palace. One of the best horses trained by Upson was Nick The Brief, winner of 11 races, including the Hennessy Irish Gold Cup at Leopardstown in 1990 and 1991 and Peter Marsh Handicap Chase at Haydock Park in 1990 On 2 February 1991, Nick The Brief was narrowly beaten by the great Desert Orchid in a tremendous duel up the Sandown Park hill in the Agfa Diamond Handicap Chase. In the 2016/17 season, Lord Wilson's colours have been carried by Issac's Warrior, trained at Maidford by Tracey Leeson, and winner of a point to point at Ballybunion in 2012

== Views ==
Wilson maintains cuts to legal aid in the UK endanger access to justice. Wilson said, "In pursuit of its economic policy the UK government has recently felt the need to dismantle much of our precious system of legal aid, introduced in 1949 along with the other two pillars of our welfare state, namely social security and the National Health Service."

== See also ==
- List of Lords Justices of Appeal
