= Farthingstone =

Village in Northamptonshire, England

Coordinates: 52.18996°N 1.10374°W

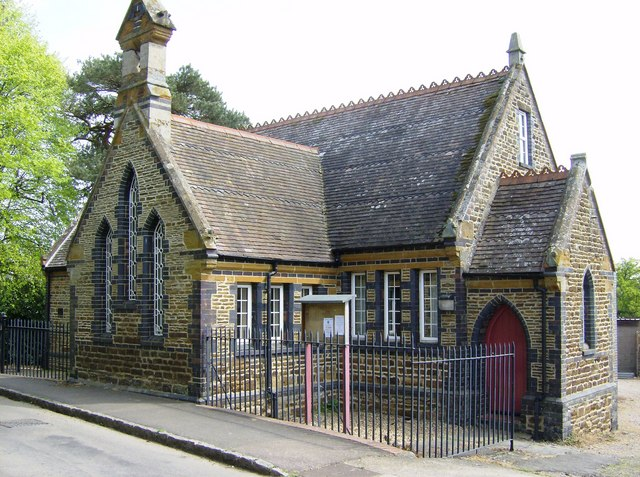
- The old school, Farthingstone

- Location within Northamptonshire
- Population: 193 (2011 Census)
- OS grid reference: SP613550
- Unitary authority: West Northamptonshire
- Ceremonial county: Northamptonshire
- Region: East Midlands
- Country: England
- Sovereign state: United Kingdom
- Post town: Towcester
- Postcode district: NN12
- Dialling code: 01327
- Police: Northamptonshire
- Fire: Northamptonshire
- Ambulance: East Midlands
- UK Parliament: Daventry

Farthingstone is a village in West Northamptonshire in England. It is close to the major trunk routes of the M1 junction 16, M40 motorway, and A5 road, at the head of a valley and is 7 miles (11 km) south of Daventry and 3.5 miles (5.6 km) south west of Weedon Bec.

== Demographics ==
The population at the 2001 census was 179, increasing to 193 at the 2011 census.

The parish church, dedicated to the Virgin Mary, dates from the late 13th century and is now grade II* listed. The church is constructed of ironstone, which was quarried locally, and the tower was added in the 13th century being located at the west end of the church. The whole church renovated in the 1920s by the Agnew family, owners of Punch magazine, as a memorial to family members killed in World War I. Since 2006, the parish has formed part of the Lambfold benefice, together with the parishes of Blakesley, Maidford, Litchborough and Adstone.

== Early history ==
The villages name probably means, 'Farthegn's farm/settlement'. Alternatively, perhaps less likely is, 'farm/settlement of Farndon's people'.

To the north-east of the village, south of Castle Dykes Farm, is evidence of a univallate hillfort and the buried remains of a Bronze Age barrow. This is a recorded national monument. To the north of Castle Dykes Farm is Castle Dykes, a Norman motte castle with three baileys. In 1712, workmen digging on the site of the castle found a "room with a vaulted stone roof, and another room beneath and rudely carved stones with human figures on them".

Farthingstone was listed in the Domesday Book as Fordinestone. Other Medieval spellings include Fardenston, Ferdingstone, Fardingestun and Fardyngton. The village was given to the Earl of Moreton by his half-brother, William the Conqueror. The land belonged to the Fawsley Hundred.

== Geography ==
The village, which is about 472 feet (144 m) above sea level, lies at the headwaters of two streams that run east into the River Nene. Farthingstone is 7 miles (11 km) equidistant from both Daventry to the north west, and Towcester to the south east. To the north of the village, towards the village of Everdon, there is extensive woodland.

== Recreation ==
There used to be an 18-hole golf course but this was sold and then closed pending redevelopment into a high end lifestyle retreat. Every summer, the Farthingstone Foot Fest takes place, which is a marathon and other shorter distance events, and aims to raise money for charity. The course takes walkers or runners over a number of stiles and through kissing gates in a figure of eight loop around the village.
