= St Bernardine's Catholic Church, Buckingham =

Roman Catholic Church in Buckingham, England

Coordinates: 51.9946°N 0.9887°W

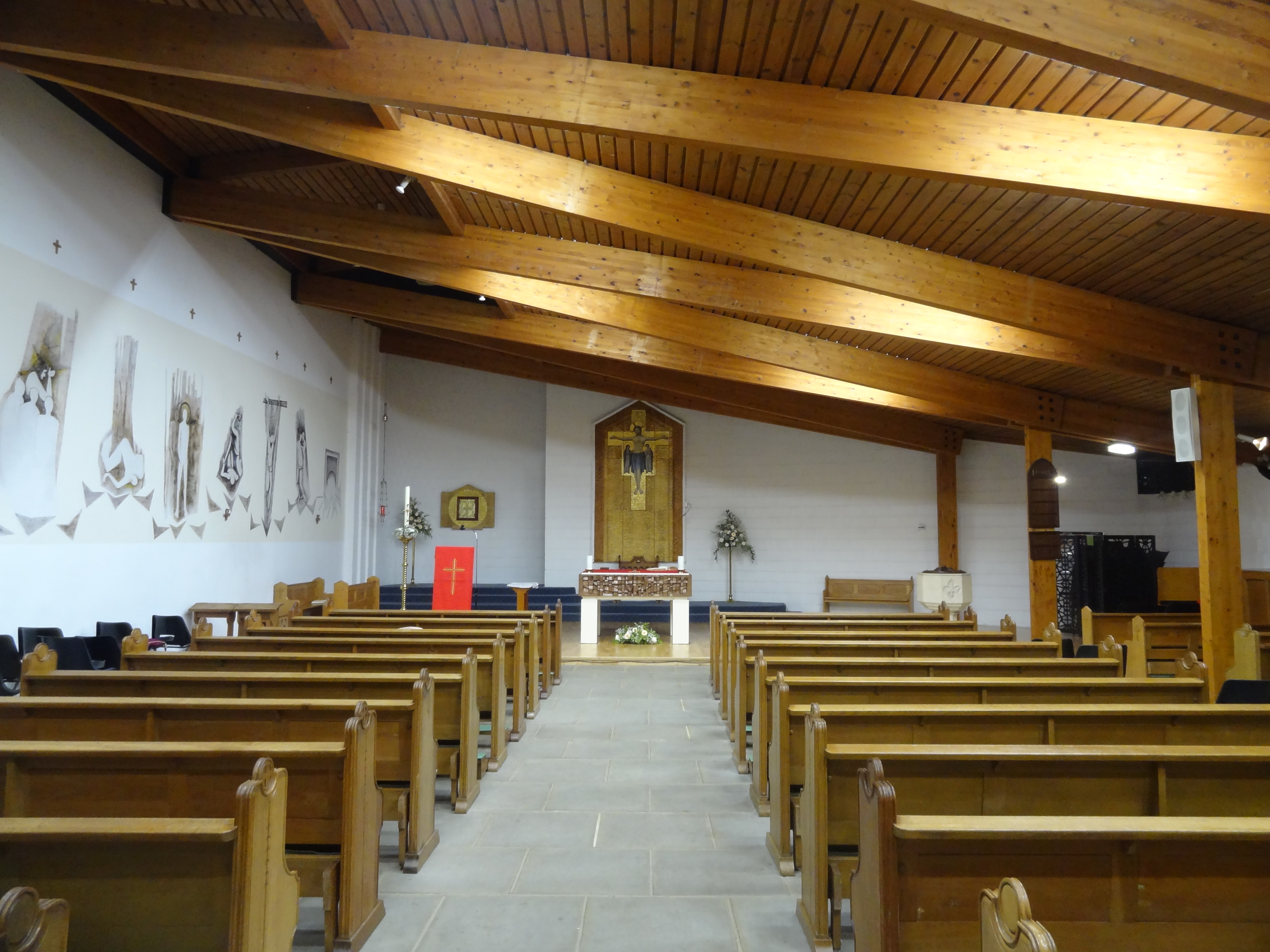
St Bernardines, 2017

St Bernardine's is the Roman Catholic Church in Buckingham, England. It is in the joint Parish of Buckingham and Brackley, together with St Martin's Catholic Church, Brackley.

== History ==
St. Bernard began in the year 1892 when a Belgian Franciscan Friar, Father Thaddeus Hermans, looking to open a college for young men wishing to become Franciscans, arrived in Buckingham for the first time on the Feast of the Ascension. He rented a cottage in Elm Street, where he said the first Mass, finally settling on 9 Chandos Road to set up his first chapel. Later he was able to obtain the site on the London Road and by the end of 1895 he had built his college. Few Catholics lived near Buckingham then but in 1900 the registers record twelve Baptisms. The college was put under the patronage of St Bernardine, a much revered Franciscan, and so the parish of St Bernardine was set around the college. The college chapel was blessed and opened for public worship in 1912.

After World War II the parish grew quickly. The Friars were called upon to open Mass centres in many of the surrounding towns and villages, including Brackley. With changing circumstances the college closed in 1968. The buildings were sold to Buckinghamshire County Council but the Friars were allowed to continue to use the chapel until the parish could build its own. Eventually it was decided to build onto the new Friary in Chandos Road where the Friars had set up their first chapel. The new church was blessed on 26 October 1974 by the Bishop Charles Grant and was dedicated in 1982. In 1989 the parish came into the care of the Diocese of Northampton.
