= Tiffield railway station =

Former railway station in Northamptonshire, England

Coordinates: 52.161941°N 0.982159°W

Tiffield

General information
- Location: Tiffield, West Northamptonshire; England
- Platforms: 1

Other information
- Status: Disused

History
- Original company: Northampton and Banbury Junction Railway

Key dates
- October 1869: Opened
- February 1871: Closed
- 1908: Last racecourse special calls
Location

Tiffield was a short-lived experimental railway station situated at the highest point of the Stratford-upon-Avon and Midland Junction Railway which opened in 1869 to serve the Northamptonshire village of Tiffield, only to close two years later.

== History ==
The Northampton & Banbury Junction Railway, a forerunner of the Stratford-upon-Avon and Midland Junction Railway, opened a line in 1866 which linked its Towcester station with the London and North Western Railway's station at Blisworth on their London to Birmingham line. An experimental passenger station was opened at Tiffield Summit, the highest point of the line, in October 1869. It consisted of little more than a timber landing stage and saw regular passenger services only until February 1871, although special services on Towcester racedays may have called at the station up to around 1908. The location of the station did not make it popular with the locomotive crew as up trains would have had a great deal of difficulty in making a standing start on such a steep uphill gradient.

Preceding station	Disused railways	Following station
Towcester	SMJR; Northampton and Banbury Junction Railway	Blisworth

== Present day ==
The station site, which used to teem with rabbits hunted by at least one locomotive driver, now forms part of the Tiffield Pocket Park, a 1 kilometre (0.62 mi) section of the trackbed which was purchased by local businessman John Mawby as a wildlife refuge after the line's closure and leased to Tiffield Parish Council in 2001 for 25 years.
