= Brackley Cricket Club Ground =

Cricket ground in Northamptonshire, England

Coordinates: 52.02594°N 1.14438°W

- Westminster Road
- Interactive map of Brackley Cricket Club Ground

Ground information
- Location: Brackley, Northamptonshire
- Country: England
- Establishment: 1865 (first recorded match)

Team information
Brackley Cricket Club	(1865-)
Northamptonshire	(1971-1975)
- As of 1 September 2010; Source: Ground profile

Brackley Cricket Club Ground (Also called Westminster Road) is a cricket ground in Brackley, Northamptonshire. The first recorded match on the ground was in 1962, when Brackley Cricket Club moved from its original ground at Manor Road.

In 1971, the ground held its first List-A match when Northamptonshire played Gloucestershire in the John Player League. From 1971 to 1975, the ground hosted 5 List-A matches, the last of which saw Northamptonshire play Nottinghamshire in 1975 John Player League.

In local domestic cricket, the ground is the home venue of Brackley Cricket Club.

== Previous grounds ==
=== "Bandilands" ===
The first recorded game of cricket in Brackley was in 1827, when 11 gentlemen from Brackley were defeated by 11 form the neighboring village of Syresham. It's assumed that this match was played at the Bandilands (sometimes referred to as Bandlands) ground, which was located close to a toll gate on the Buckingham, Brackely and Banbury turnpike - this is now the A422.

Bandilands hosted Brackley for many years, in games vs local teams such as Banbury and Deddington (1830s), Buckingham (1842 - this match brought with it much controversy as Buckingham fielded a player who farmed half a mile away from Buckingham itself. Brackley objected stating it was arranged to be "town against town, not parish against parish"). In June 1865, "a large company" assembled to watch George Parr's All England Eleven defeat 22 from Brackley Cricket Club (including Joseph Timms, grandfather of future Northamptonshire County Cricket Club stalwart Jack Timms) by 80 runs. A year later, Surrey professionals Thomas Humphrey and Harry Jupp brought a team to Brackley, and comfortably beat 16 locals, though this game "did not attract a large attendance". In 1882, Brackley CC competed in the inaugural Northamptonshire Rural Challenge Cup, beating Eydon by an innings in the first round but losing to Rushden in the second (Rushden were the eventual winners of the tournament).

=== "Manor Road" ===
Bandilands was home to Brackley CC until 1910, when they moved to one of the school's playing fields for a yearly rent of £15 10s around the outbreak of the First World War (approximately £1,120.33 today). The club had many concerns over its security of tenure at the Manor Road ground and was eventually asked to leave the ground in September 1960 as the playing field was required full time by the school.

=== "Westminster Road" ===
Following being asked to leave Manor Road, Brackley Cricket Club found its new home at Westminster Road, which was leased from Brackley Borough Council on 20 May 1961. Brackley CC continue to call Westminster Road home to this day.

== Northamptonshire Cricket Club matches ==
At Brackley Cricket Club's annual dinner in 1952, then Northamptonshire captain Freddie Brown promised to bring county Second XI cricket to Brackley, and this he did as Manor Road played host to Northants Second XI fixtures between 1954 and 1955. Various benefit matches were hosted in Brackley too, which were well supported.

In July 1971, however, Brackley hosted its first Northamptonshire First XI game versus Gloucestershire in the John Player League. Spectators took their seats on straw bales around the ground as they watched Gloucestershire (including Mike Procter) beat Northants in a tightly contested match. Sussex were scheduled to visit Westminster Road in 1972, but poor weather meant the game was to be abandoned before a ball could be bowled. Brackley were then scheduled to host the lucrative match versus Kent in 1973, which could bring any number of cricket stars to the ground, including Brian Luckhurst, Asif Iqbal, Alan Knott and Derek Underwood. Northamptonshire were on the receiving end of a rather heavy loss which is still, to this day, the county's second-heaviest defeat by runs in a List A competition. Northants hosted Somerset in 1974 (when they were beaten again), as spectators from the town were treated to a century from Peter Denning, but also a brisk 35 from Viv Richards, who was 22 at the time and playing his first season of county cricket, as well as a 4 wicket haul from Bob Clapp. The final Northants match to be played at Westminster Road was in 1975, when Northants hosted Nottinghamshire. The hosts had better fortunes and won by six wickets.
