= Adstone =

Village in Northamptonshire, England

Coordinates: 52.1586°N 1.1293°W

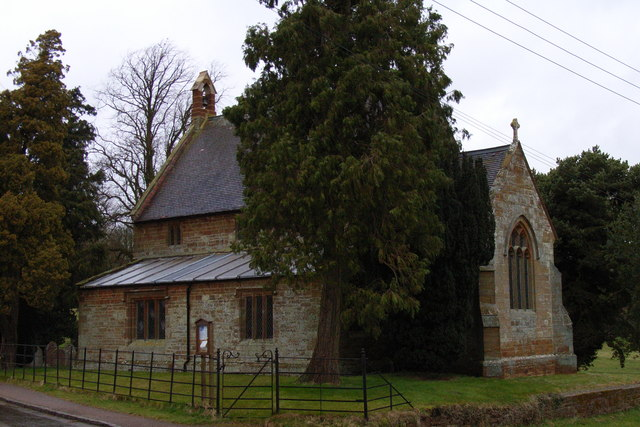
- All Saints Church

- Location within Northamptonshire
- Population: 65 (2001 census); 89 (2010 est.)
- OS grid reference: SP595515
- Civil parish: Adstone
- Unitary authority: West Northamptonshire
- Ceremonial county: Northamptonshire
- Region: East Midlands
- Country: England
- Sovereign state: United Kingdom
- Post town: TOWCESTER
- Postcode district: NN12
- Dialling code: 01327
- Police: Northamptonshire
- Fire: Northamptonshire
- Ambulance: East Midlands
- UK Parliament: Daventry

Adstone is a village and civil parish in West Northamptonshire, England. The population at the 2001 census was 65. It remained than 100 at the 2011 census and was included in the civil parish of Tiffield. Adstone is situated approximately 6.5 miles (10 km) south-southeast of Daventry and 6.5 miles (10 km) west-northwest of Towcester. It was known as Atenestone in the Domesday Book.

== History ==
The villages name means 'Aettin's farm/settlement'.

Adstone was a chapelry within the parish of Canons Ashby until 1866, when it was promoted to a civil parish. It became a separate ecclesiastical parish in 1867. The parish church, dedicated to All Saints, is of Norman origin, ca. 13th century. It was heavily restored in both 1843, when the chancel was added and again in 1896. Since 2006 the parish has formed part of the Lambfold benefice along with the parishes of Blakesley, Maidford, Litchborough and Farthingstone. The Manor House is late 17th century, the Old Vicarage dates to 1870 by Edmund Francis Law, the school to 1846 and the Methodist Chapel is 1849 in Georgian style.

The Imperial Gazetteer of England and Wales in the 1870s described Adstone as follows:

a chapelry in Ashby-Canons parish, Northampton; 5¾ miles SSW of Weedon r. station, and 6¾ WNW of Towcester. Post Town, Blakesley, under Towcester. Acres, 1,190. Real property, £2,281. Pop., 165. Houses, 36. The living is a p. curacy in the diocese of Peterborough. Value, £130. Patrons, the Sons of Clergy Corporation. There is a Wesleyan chapel

The censuses showed that the population declined from 184 in 1871 to 80 in 1961 and 65 in 2001.
