= All Saints Church, Adstone =

Church in Adstone, Northamptonshire

Coordinates: 52°09′27″N 1°07′50″W

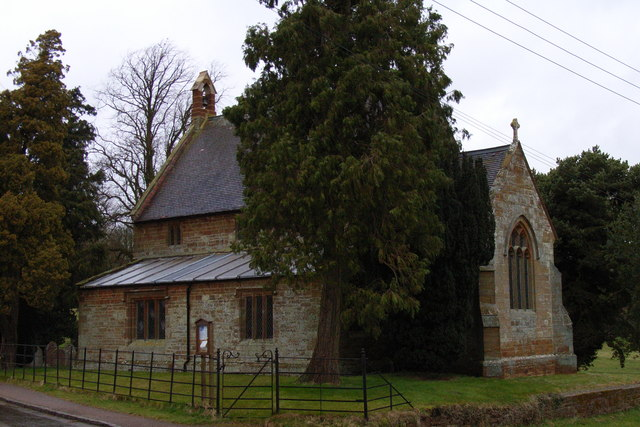
- All Saints Church, Adstone
- Denomination: Church of England

History
- Dedication: All Saints

Administration
- Diocese: Peterborough
- Parish: Adstone

Clergy
- Vicar: Sue Stanley

All Saints Church is a Grade II listed church in Adstone, Northamptonshire, England.
