= Brackley Town Hall =

Municipal building in Brackley, Northamptonshire, England

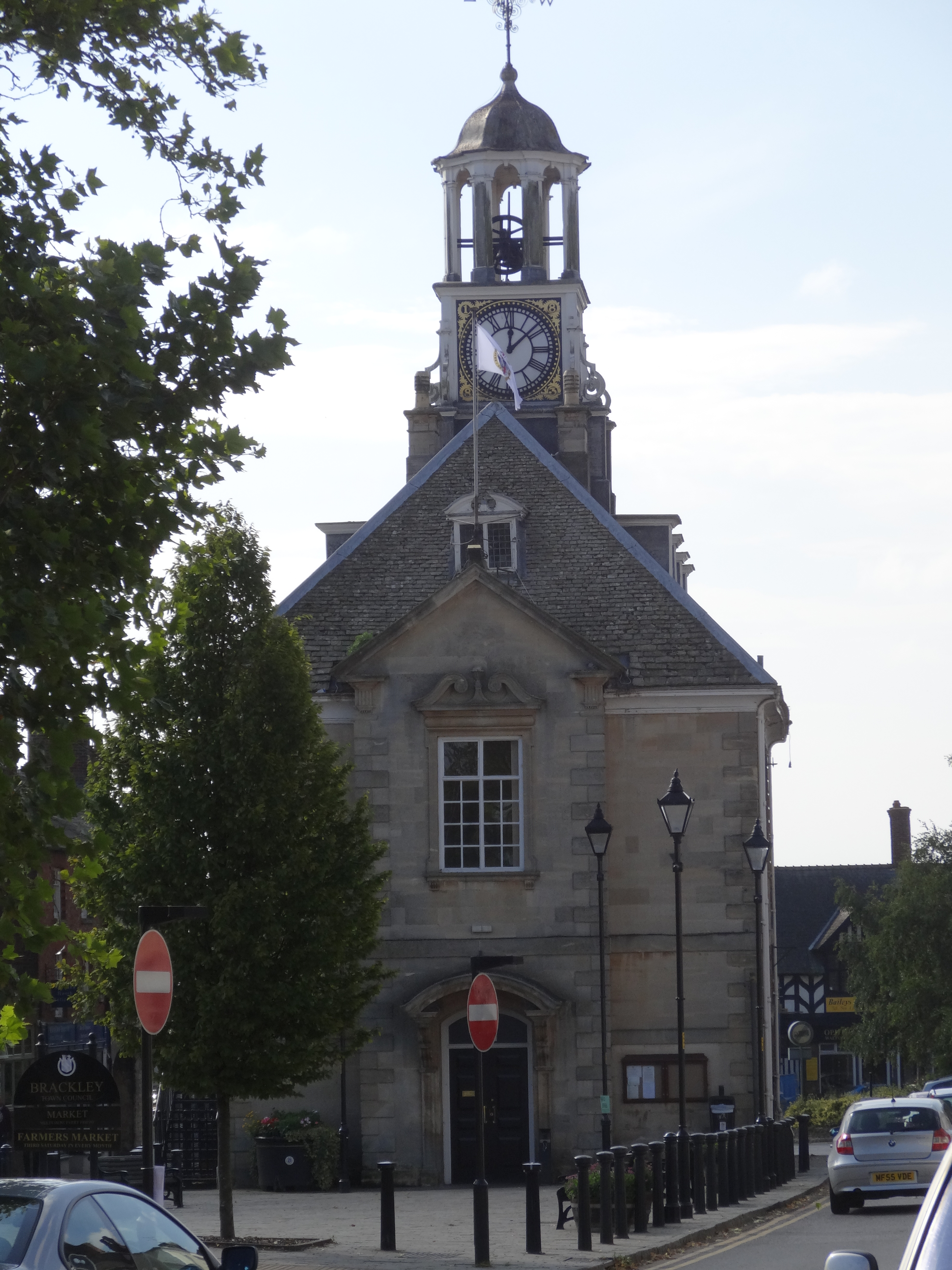
- Brackley Town Hall

- Shown in Northamptonshire
- 52.0266°N 1.1498°W
- Location: Market Place, Brackley

History
- Built: 1706

Site notes
- Architectural style: Georgian style

Listed Building – Grade II*
- Official name: Town Hall
- Designated: 22 April 1950
- Reference no.: 1190100

Brackley Town Hall is a municipal structure in the Market Place, Brackley, Northamptonshire, England. The structure, which serves as the meeting place of Brackley Town Council, is a Grade II* listed building.

== History ==
The building was commissioned by lord of the manor, Scroop Egerton, 4th Earl of Bridgewater, as a market hall for the people of the town. It was designed in the Georgian style, built in ashlar stone at a cost of £2,000 and was completed in 1706. It was arcaded on the ground floor, so that markets could be held, with an assembly room on the first floor. The design of the building, which was located in the middle of the High Street, involved symmetrical main frontages with five bays facing onto the east and west sides of the High Street. At roof level there were dormer windows on all sides and a central clock tower with a cupola. Internally, the principal room was the assembly room on the first floor.

The theologian, John Wesley, preached outside the town hall in 1784, although he expressed concerns that the crowd showed "understanding [of] me no more than if I had been talking Greek". Brackley had a very small electorate and two dominant patrons (the 8th Earl of Bridgewater and the 2nd Marquess of Stafford), which meant it was recognised by the UK Parliament as a rotten borough: the right of the borough to elect members of parliament was removed by the Reform Act 1832. In June 1840, the member of parliament for South Northamptonshire and chairman of the board of guardians, Colonel William Cartright, was presented with a large tureen in the town hall in recognition of his work to promote poor law reforms in the town including the creation of a new workhouse.

In 1883, the south front was significantly enhanced; the centre bay, which now projected forward, featured a doorway with a stone canopy, a mullioned window on the first floor and a pediment above. The borough council, which continued to meet in the town hall, was reformed under the Municipal Corporations Act 1883. At the same time a new clock was installed, by J. W. Benson of Ludgate Hill. The town hall continued to serve as the meeting place of the borough council for much of the 20th century as well, but ceased to be the local seat of government when the enlarged South Northamptonshire District Council was formed in 1974. It subsequently became the meeting place of Brackley Town Council.

In 2016, the building closed for an extensive programme of refurbishment works which involved the installation of a new staircase and lift, the renovation of the clock by Smith of Derby and the procurement of a replacement bell cast by John Taylor & Co for the clock tower. The works also involved the creation of an attic flat for hire by holiday makers, and 26 stained glass roundels, designed by Rachel Aldridge, were inserted into the windows. The works, which were undertaken to a design by Haverstock, were carried out by Borras Construction at a cost £3.2 million and were substantially funded by the Heritage Lottery Fund; the building was officially re-opened by the Lord Lieutenant of Northamptonshire, David Eric Laing, on 11 September 2018. The restoration work was highly commended in the regional Civic Trust awards and was also recognised with a regional award by the Royal Institute of British Architects.

Works of art in the town hall include four paintings by Dean Wolstenholme the younger, all depicting hunting scenes.

== See also ==
- Grade II* listed buildings in South Northamptonshire
