= St Martin's Catholic Church, Brackley =

Roman Catholic Church in Brackley, England

Coordinates: 52.0276°N 1.1513°W

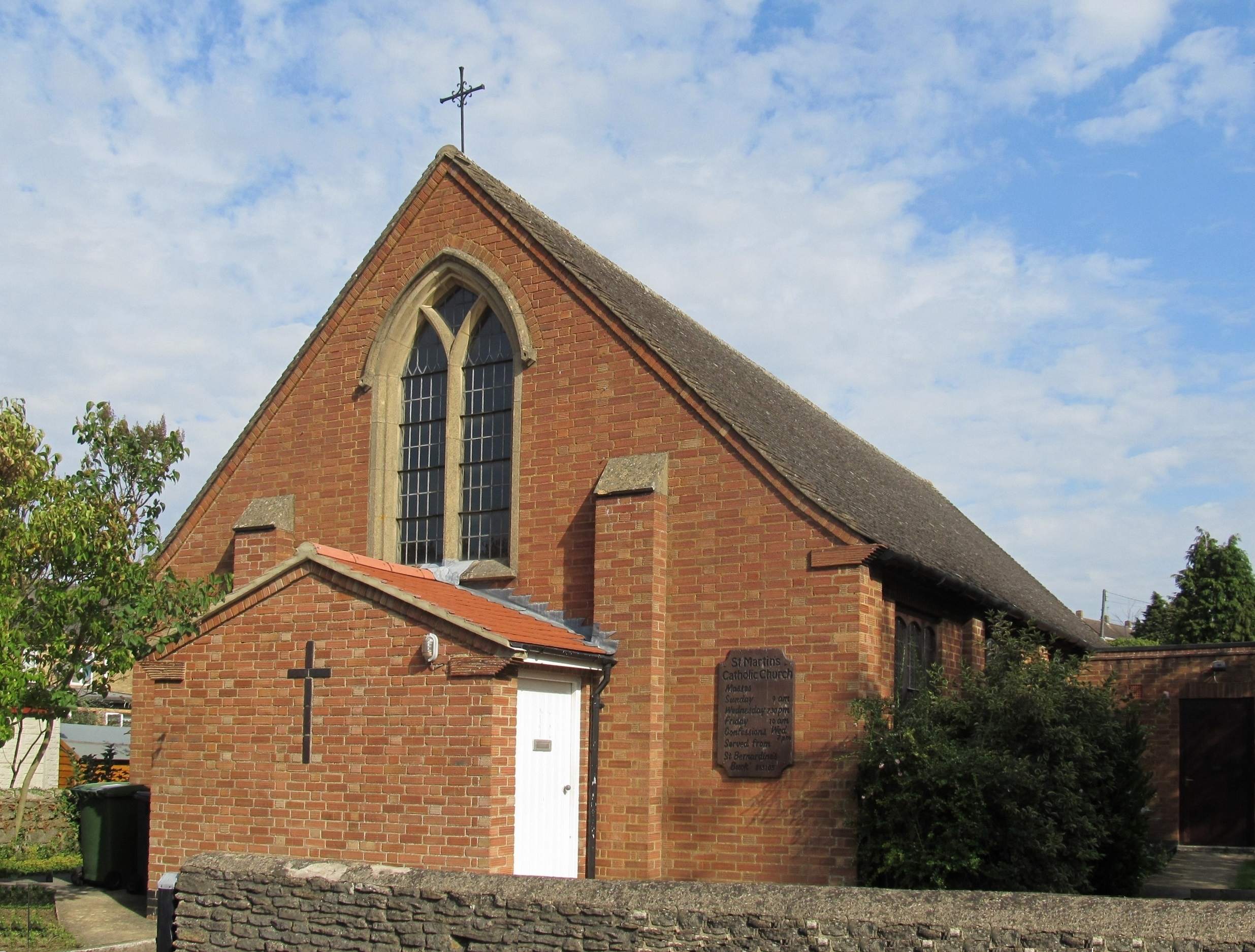
St Martin's

St Martin's is the Roman Catholic Church in Brackley. It is in the joint Parish of Buckingham and Brackley, together with St Bernardine's Catholic Church, Buckingham, in the Roman Catholic Diocese of Northampton.
