= Blisworth railway station =

Former railway station in Northamptonshire, England

Coordinates: 52.18479°N 0.94561°W

Blisworth
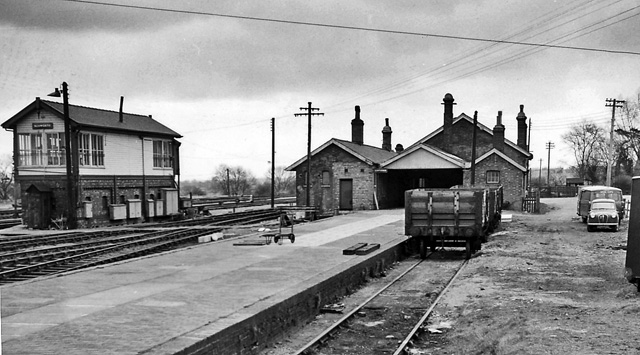
- View eastward, towards Bletchley and London on the West Coast Main Line

General information
- Location: Blisworth, West Northamptonshire; England
- Grid reference: SP721545
- Platforms: 4

Other information
- Status: Disused

History
- Original company: London and Birmingham Railway
- Pre-grouping: London and North Western Railway
- Post-grouping: London, Midland and Scottish Railway; London Midland Region of British Railways

Key dates
- 17 September 1838: Station opened
- 1853: replaced by new station
- 4 January 1960: Station closed
Location

Blisworth railway station was a junction station on the London and North Western Railway (today, the West Coast Main Line), the Northampton and Banbury Junction Railway, and the Northampton and Peterborough Railway. As well as providing interchange between the lines, the station served the village of Blisworth in Northamptonshire and its environs. The station was opened by the London and Birmingham Railway (L&BR) in 1838.

== History ==
The station was opened on 17 September 1838. In 1845 the L&BR opened its Northampton and Peterborough Railway, a line which connected Peterborough East and Northampton Bridge Street from a junction nearby. The station was rebuilt 805 metres (880 yd) to the north in 1853, closer to the junction, to facilitate changing trains.

In 1846 the line, along with the L&BR, became part of the London and North Western Railway.

In 1866 a line was opened to Banbury by the Northampton & Banbury Junction Railway. This railway built a small corrugated iron motive power depot at the station in 1882, together with a turntable and other servicing facilities. This was closed in 1929, but locomotives continued to be serviced in the yard until the closure of the station.

At grouping in 1923 it became part of the London Midland and Scottish Railway.

During the 1950s the morning express from Windermere to Euston stopped at Blisworth for a connection to Northampton and to make use of the water tower on the up platform.

The station closed on 4 January 1960, and was demolished soon afterward. The Blisworth Hotel facing the station, now The Walnut Tree Inn, remains in business.

== Routes ==
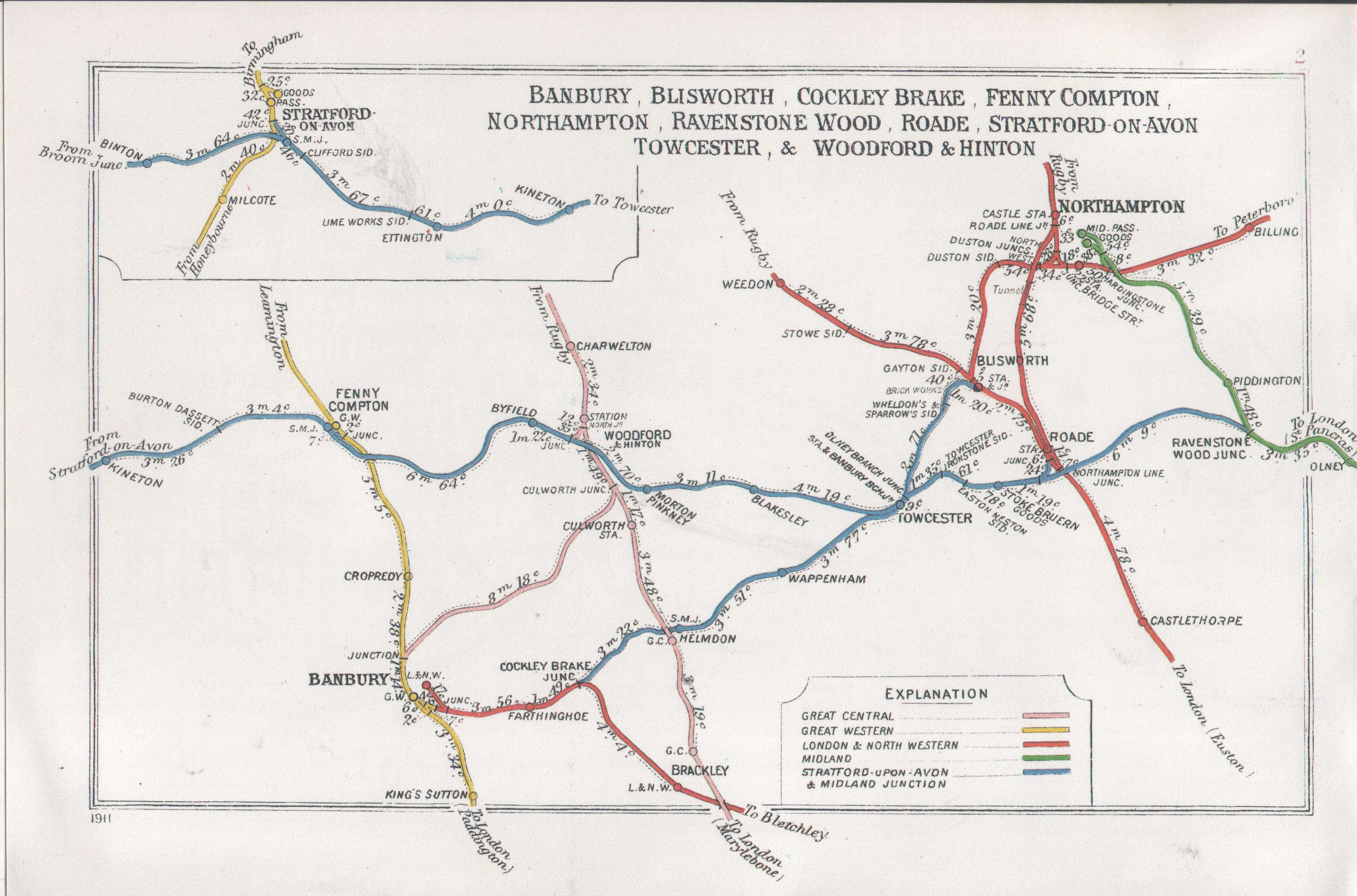
A 1911 Railway Clearing House map of railways in the vicinity of Blisworth (middle right, in red and blue)

Former services

Preceding station	Disused railways	Following station
Weedon	London and Birmingham Railway	Roade
Terminus	Northampton and Peterborough Railway	Northampton Bridge Street
Terminus	SMJR; Northampton and Banbury Junction Railway	Tiffield
