= Blakesley =

Village in Northamptonshire, England

Coordinates: 52.1465°N 1.0857°W

- Location within Northamptonshire
- Population: 508 (2011)
- OS grid reference: SP625502
  - London: 70 miles (113 km)
- Unitary authority: West Northamptonshire
- Ceremonial county: Northamptonshire
- Region: East Midlands
- Country: England
- Sovereign state: United Kingdom
- Post town: Towcester
- Postcode district: NN12
- Dialling code: 01327
- Police: Northamptonshire
- Fire: Northamptonshire
- Ambulance: East Midlands
- UK Parliament: South Northamptonshire

Blakesley is a village in the West Northamptonshire unitary authority area of Northamptonshire, England. It is about 5 miles (8 km) west of Towcester. It is about 400 feet (120 m) above sea level according to Ordnance Survey. North-west of Blakesley, and now contiguous with it, is the hamlet of Quinbury End.

== History ==
The name is believed to have come from an Old English place-name meaning "Blaecwulf's wood or clearing" (or "black wolf's wood/clearing"). Over time the name contracted to the present form. The name of the brook running through the village, the Black Ouse, was derived from the name of the village, and not the other way round as sometimes claimed.

== Demographics ==
According to the 2001 census it had a population of 492, increasing to 508 at the 2011 census.

== Facilities ==
Blakesley has a pub named the Bartholomew Arms, a primary school and its own village shop with a post office. Blakesley Church of England Primary School in the village is in the catchment area of Sponne School in Towcester.

== Buildings ==
=== Blakesley Hall ===
The village was the location of Blakesley Hall, a 13th-century Manor House. It was owned by Charles William Bartholomew, but demolished in 1957-58.

=== Parish Church ===
The parish church, built in the style of the Early English Period, dates from the late 13th century, the first parish priest having been recorded as a certain William of Melchbourne, who took office in 1275. The church is dedicated to St Mary. Since 2006 it has formed part of the Lambfold benefice along with the parishes of Adstone, Maidford, Litchborough and Farthingstone. There are memorials to Matthew Swetenham (D.1416), Bowbearer to Henry IV, and also William Wattes (d.1614).

=== Other buildings ===
The church building itself forms the centre of a number of obviously ecclesiastical buildings probably related to a religious community. South-east of the church is a house dated 1689. Glebe farm, west of the church has a Perpendicular doorway and part of a Perpendicular window. The Sycamores, south of the church is dated 1670. Kendall House is 18th-century and a former Inn. Seawell farm is part of the Grafton Estate of 1840.

=== Blakesley railway station ===
The station on the Stratford-upon-Avon and Midland Junction Railway (SMJ) served the village from 1873 to 1962. It was linked to nearby Blakesley Hall by a miniature railway which ran from a terminal adjacent to the station. Nothing remains of the building.

=== Barrow ===
There is a Barrow at Woodend about 250 yards east of Green's Park Farm.
