= H. Bronnley & Co. =

British soap and toiletries producer

H. Bronnley & Co UK Ltd
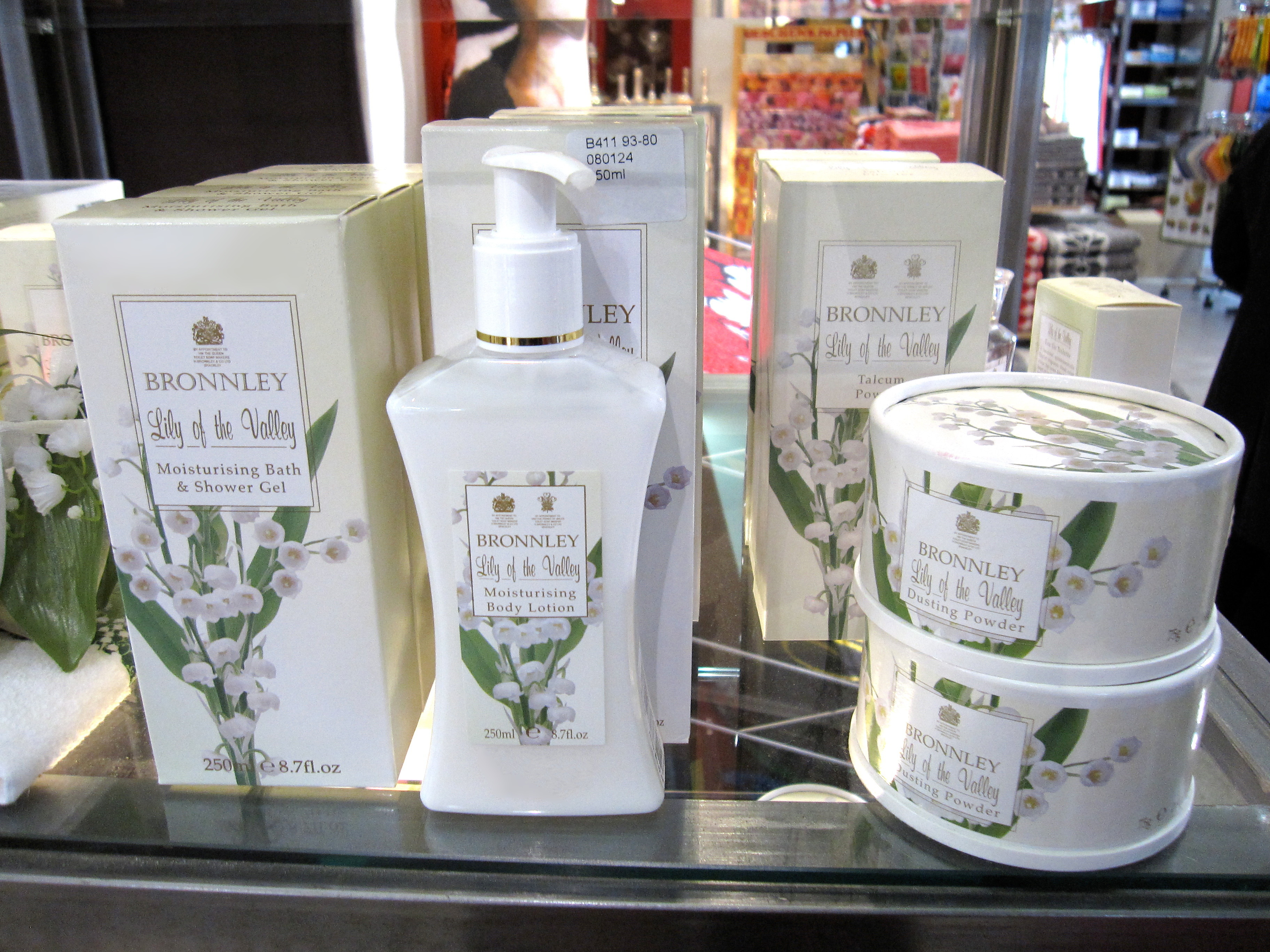
- Traded as: Bronnley
- Founder: James Heilbronn
- Headquarters: Milton Keynes, England
- Area served: International
- Products: toiletries

H. Bronnley & Co. (or Bronnley) is a British soap and toiletries producer established in London. The company moved to Brackley, Northamptonshire before 1961 and was located in the old Chesham and Brackley Brewery premises, with their box making department located across the road in an old manor house. Following closure of its factory, the company relocated its head office to Milton Keynes in 2013.

== History ==
The company was founded in 1890 by James Heilbronn, who was originally from Germany. Today, the company claims his name was James Bronnley.

Starting in a shed in Holborn, London, the quality of his soaps soon led to an expansion. First to larger premises in Islington and then to a larger plant in Acton, London. The company stayed in Acton until a large fire in 1949. The company relocated to Brackley, Northamptonshire, where the present factory was built and opened in 1989.

The company remained in family control for three generations until 2007 when it was subject to a management buy-in for around £10million. Chairman Ann Rossiter retired as part of the deal, with the new management team led by former Lornamead chief executive, Leslie Barber and Scott Dougan from Revlon.

In November 2011 the company went into administration and was bought out by shareholders. The company subsequently announced that manufacturing would be outsourced in the future.

Bronnley today is one of the leading British soap and toiletries brands. Their website has relaunched, and they have been awarded a Royal Warrant to HM The King. Previously, they held a British Royal Warrant by appointment to the late Queen Elizabeth II and were also used by King Charles III when he was the Prince of Wales.
