= St John the Baptist's Church, Tiffield =

Church in Tiffield, Northamptonshire, England

Coordinates: 52.159061°N 0.978613°W

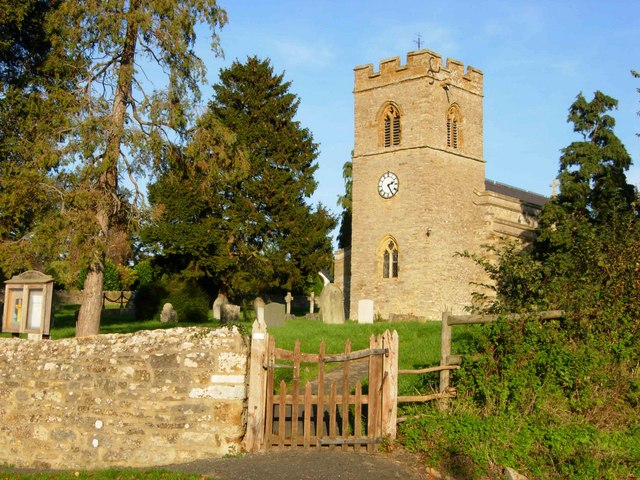
St. John the Baptist Church November, 2006.

Tiffield St. John the Baptist Church is a church in the small village of Tiffield in Northamptonshire, England.

The church dates from around 1200, and is by far the oldest building in the village. It is situated in High Street South, next to the Reading Room, now known as the Church Room, as it is no longer used for reading. The vicar of Tiffield church (who is also the vicar of Pattishall, Gayton and Cold Higham) was Father Paul Broadbent until summer 2010.

The church was restored and renewed in 1859 by Edmund Francis Law and later in 1873 by H C Vernon. The font is Norman.
