= Tiffield =

Village in Northamptonshire, England

Coordinates: 52.161°N 0.980°W

- Location within Northamptonshire
- Population: 370 (2001 Census); 362 (2011 census)
- OS grid reference: SP698517
  - London: 67 miles (108 km)
- Civil parish: Tiffield
- Unitary authority: West Northamptonshire
- Ceremonial county: Northamptonshire
- Region: East Midlands
- Country: England
- Sovereign state: United Kingdom
- Post town: TOWCESTER
- Postcode district: NN12
- Dialling code: 01327
- Police: Northamptonshire
- Fire: Northamptonshire
- Ambulance: East Midlands
- UK Parliament: Northampton South

Tiffield is a village and civil parish in Northamptonshire, England, north of Towcester between the A5 road to its west and the A43 road to its east.

The village's name origin is dubious. It has been suggested that the primary component of this obscure name could be 'meeting place', 'goat' or 'bee/swarm'. "Field" meant a piece of open land and the whole name could mean open land with or near to a meeting place.

== Governance ==
Tiffield is part of the district of West Northamptonshire.

== Demographics ==
The 2001 census shows 370 residents, 185 each male and female, living in 142 dwellings. The population at the 2011 census included Adstone but had fallen to 362.

== Facilities ==
The primary school is one of the smallest in the country, with just 46 pupils in the 2007–08 academic year. It is Church of England, Voluntary Aided and has two classrooms. The old Victorian school building, used for KS2 and a 1960s mobile classroom for KS1, was to be demolished in summer 2008 and replaced by a modern classroom behind the Victorian building. Most pupils who leave the school progress to Sponne School in Towcester. There is a church dedicated to St John the Baptist and a pub, The George. It also has a pocket park and a playing field, Claydon's Field, which was opened in 1979 after eight years of fundraising by villagers.

The village has one main road, which runs from the St. John's turning on the A43 to the village of Gayton. Two 1960s roads exist: Pigeon Hill at the southern end of the village and Meadow Rise at the northern end. The village is approximately ½ mile long. It is linked directly to Gayton and Eastcote by road.

Tiffield Pocket Park was declared a Local Nature Reserve in 2008. The Pocket Park land was originally part of the Northampton and Banbury Junction Railway, which was closed in the 1960s. It now is a linear trail connecting several footpaths and rights of way. Three orchid species are found within the Pocket Park and may be seen flowering between April and June (depending on the season).

== The Gateway School ==
The Gateway school teaches more than 50 pupils with behavioural, emotional and social difficulties. It moved from its old building in Raeburn Road, Northampton in May 2008 which cost £6.4m of government funding. The official opening ceremony was attended by HRH The Duchess of Gloucester. The site was occupied by an approved school many years ago and, before that the Northampton Society's Reformatory School for Boys which opened on 21 January 1856.

== Iron industry ==
There was an iron works next to the railway to the south of the village. It lasted from 1875 to 1882. It operated the Siemens Direct Process using ore from a nearby quarry at Hulcote but the local ore was found to be unsuitable for that process. The quarry continued in operation until 1920, as did a newer quarry started closer to Tiffield in 1908.

== See also ==
- Tiffield St. John the Baptist Church
- Tiffield railway station
