= Maidford =

Civil parish in Northamptonshire, England

Coordinates: 52.1674°N 1.1087°W

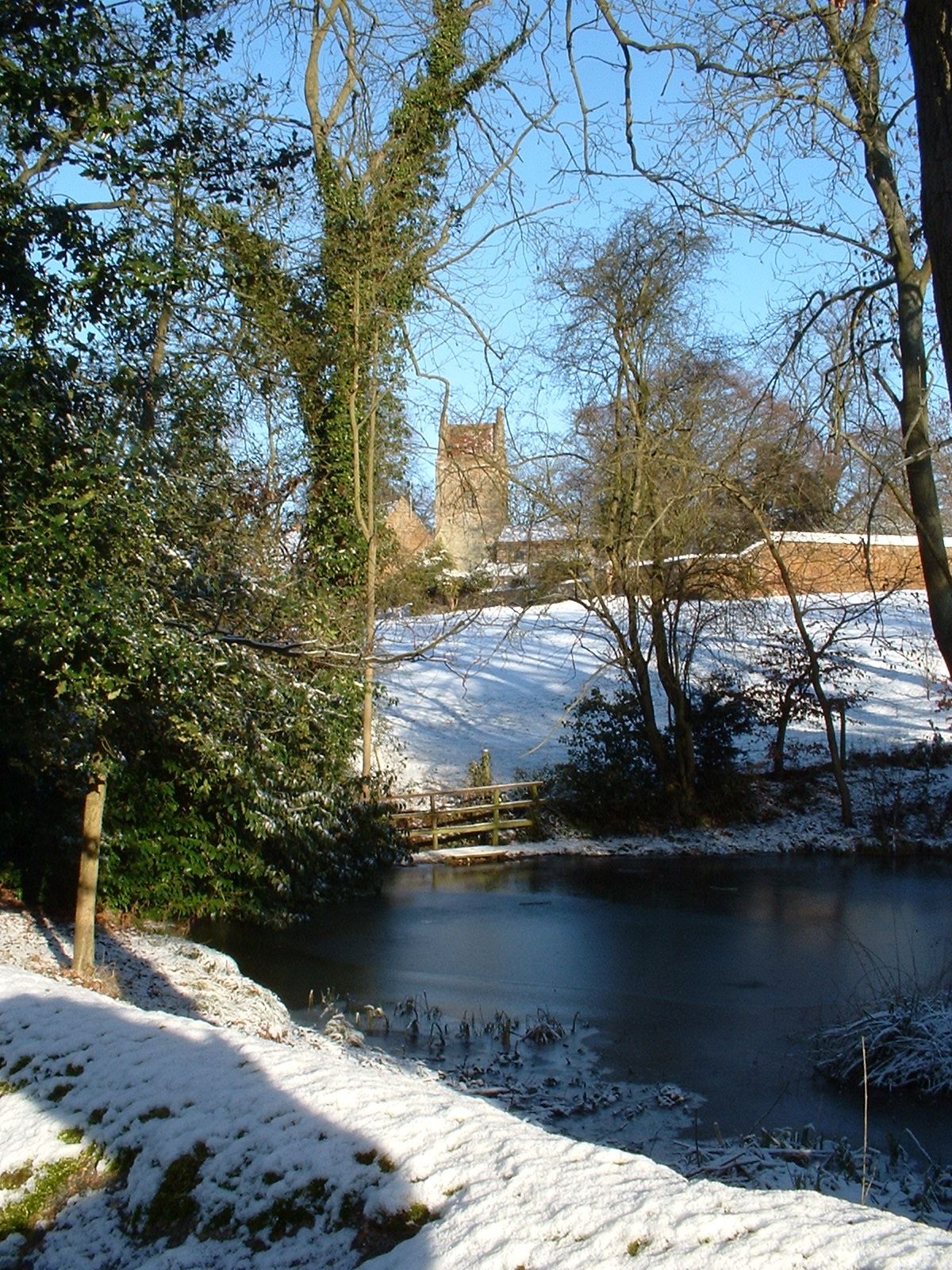
- The 13th-century parish church is dedicated to St Peter and St Paul

- Location within Northamptonshire
- Population: 168 (2011 Census) 179 (2001 Census)
- OS grid reference: SP609525
  - London: 71 miles (114 km)
- Unitary authority: West Northamptonshire
- Ceremonial county: Northamptonshire
- Region: East Midlands
- Country: England
- Sovereign state: United Kingdom
- Post town: Towcester
- Postcode district: NN12
- Dialling code: 01327
- Police: Northamptonshire
- Fire: Northamptonshire
- Ambulance: East Midlands
- UK Parliament: Daventry

Maidford is a civil and ecclesiastical parish in West Northamptonshire and the diocese of Peterborough situated about 6 miles (9.7 km) north-west of Towcester. The population at the 2011 census was 168. It was a centre of local Northamptonshire lace-making until the early 20th century.

== History ==
The villages name means 'Maidens' ford'.

Maidford is mentioned in the Domesday Book as the settlement Merdeford Manor.

== Buildings ==
The 13th-century parish church is dedicated to St Peter and St Paul, and forms the centre of a monastic complex used as an hospitalium by the nearby Abbey at Canons Ashby. Since 2006 the parish has been part of the Lambfold Benefice along with the parishes of Blakesley, Adstone, Farthingstone and Litchborough.
