= St Peter and St Paul's Church, Preston Deanery =

Coordinates: 52.1937°N 0.8481°W

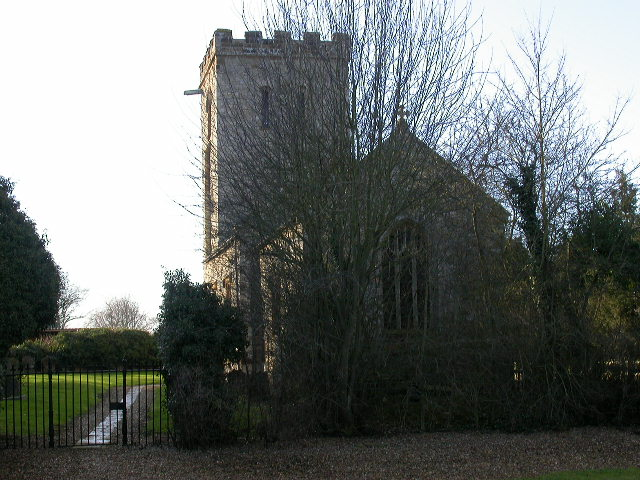
- St Peter and St Paul's Church, Preston Deanery, from the east

- Location in Northamptonshire
- OS grid reference: NZ 274 513
- Location: Preston Deanery, Northamptonshire
- Country: England
- Denomination: Anglican
- Website: Churches Conservation Trust

Architecture
- Functional status: Redundant
- Heritage designation: Grade II*
- Designated: 3 May 1968
- Architectural type: Church
- Style: Norman, Gothic, Gothic Revival

Specifications
- Length: 77 feet (23.5 m)
- Materials: Limestone with ironstone dressings, slate roofs

St Peter and St Paul's Church is a redundant Anglican church in the hamlet of Preston Deanery, Northamptonshire, England. It is recorded in the National Heritage List for England as a designated Grade II* listed building, and is under the care of the Churches Conservation Trust. Although the church is not open for regular worship, it still hosts occasional special services, such as Pentecost and Christmas services for the Living Brook Benefice.

== History ==
The church originated in the 12th century, its tower, nave walls, and the west wall of the chancel remaining from that time. The chancel was extended in the 13th century, and at the same time a parapet and new windows were added to the tower. After the Reformation, the church became unused. In the 16th century it became a ruin, the bells and lead were sold, and it was partly demolished. During this time the chancel was used as a dog kennel, and the tower as a pigeon house. The church was extensively repaired in about 1622, the south door and windows in the nave and chancel date from this period. Further repairs and alterations to the chancel were undertaken in 1808, and again in 1854, the latter by E. F. Law. There were more restorations in 1901 and 1976. The church was declared redundant on 1 March 1972, and was vested in the Churches Conservation Trust on 12 April 1976.

== Architecture ==
=== Exterior ===
The church is constructed in coursed limestone rubble, the dressings are in ironstone and the roof is slate. Its plan consists of a nave, chancel and west tower. The nave measures 29 feet 3 inches (8.9 m) by 19 feet 3 inches (5.9 m), the chancel 24 feet (7.3 m) by 13 feet 6 inches (4.1 m), and the tower is internally 13 feet 6 inches (4.1 m) square. The tower is about 50 feet (15.2 m) high and is in three stages. In the centre of each side is a pilaster buttress. On the north side in the bottom stage is a blocked round-arched doorway, and an external piscina. The middle stage has small round-headed windows. In the upper stage there are two single-light bell openings on the east face, and a two-light bell opening on each of the other sides. The parapet is battlemented. The east window has three lights and contains Perpendicular style tracery inserted in the 19th century. Over the window is a date stone inscribed with the date 1808, and flanking it are buttresses. In the north wall of the chancel is a blocked doorway with a Tudor arch, and a two-light mullioned window at a high level. In the south wall is a three-light window, two blocked windows, and a blocked priest's doorway with a round arch. In the nave is a four-light window on the north side, and in the south wall a Tudor-arched door flanked by two-light windows.

=== Interior ===
The chancel arch is Norman in style. It is completely rendered, other than the string courses between the tops of the piers and the bases of the arches. When the rendering was removed from the string courses by the Upper Nene Archaeological Society, it was discovered that they were decorated with carvings. The carvings include sawtooth patterns, lozenge motifs, and depictions of a snake and birds. It has been suggested that they are in Viking style, and were possibly re-used from a former churchyard cross. However this has been refuted by Kathryn Morrison who expresses the opinion that the carvings date from the late 11th or early 12th century, and that an earlier date is "impossible". She also states that "the suggestion that the carvings are from a churchyard cross is difficult to substantiate". Elsewhere in the church, the chancel contains a sedilia, a piscina and an aumbry. The font is inserted into the north pier of the tower arch, and consists of a bowl on a polygonal stem. Also in the church are two hatchments, and memorials. There is one bell, cast by Henry Penn of Peterborough in 1710. The church plate includes a cup and paten dated 1860.

== See also ==
- List of churches preserved by the Churches Conservation Trust in the English Midlands
