= Brackley =

Market town in Northamptonshire, England

Coordinates: 52.032°N 1.147°W

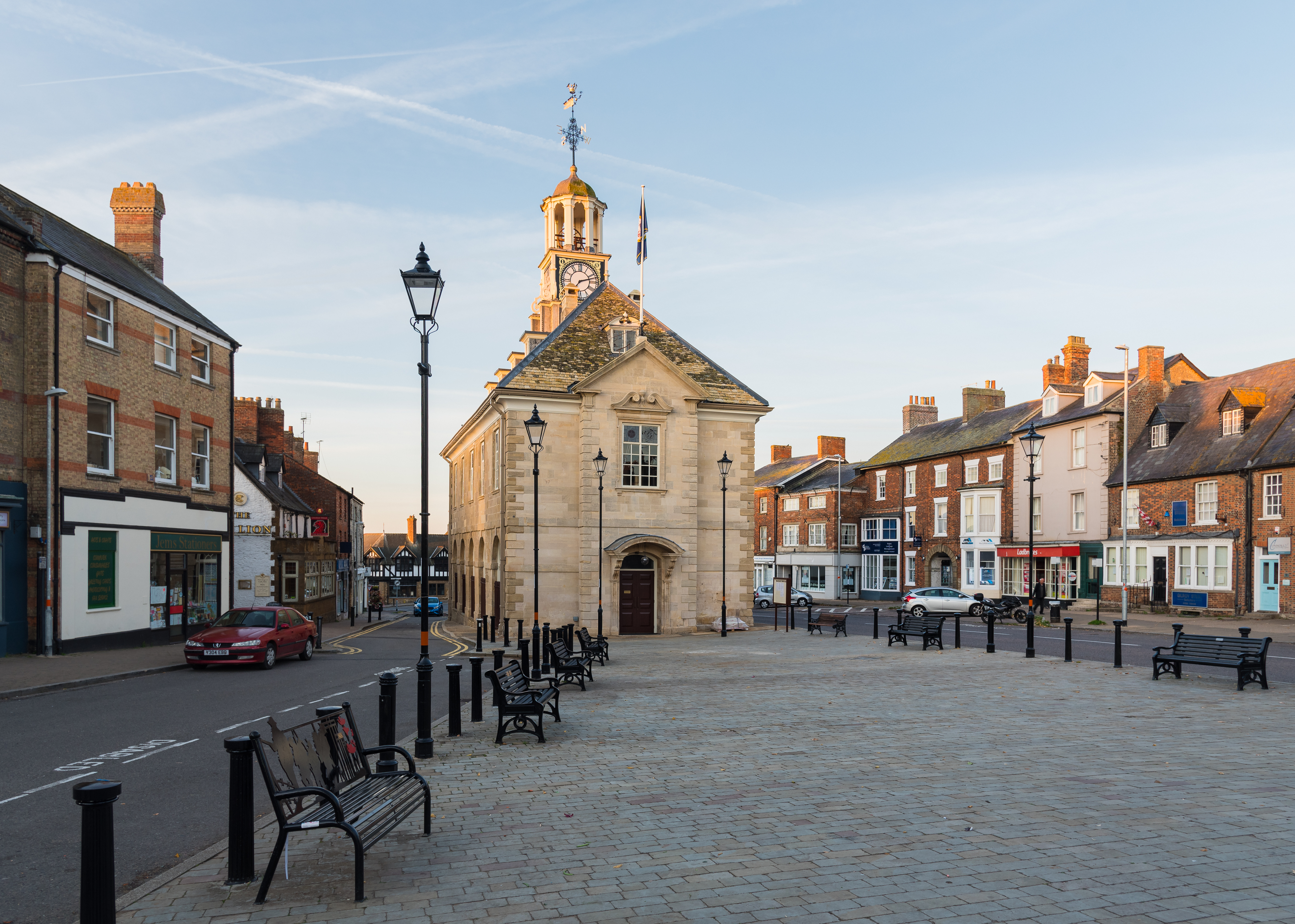
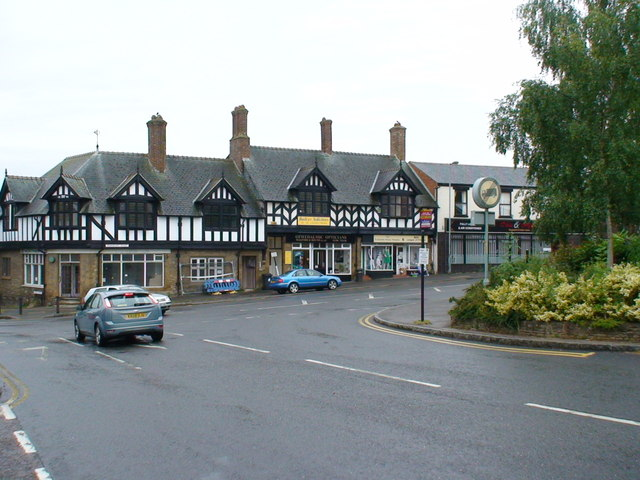
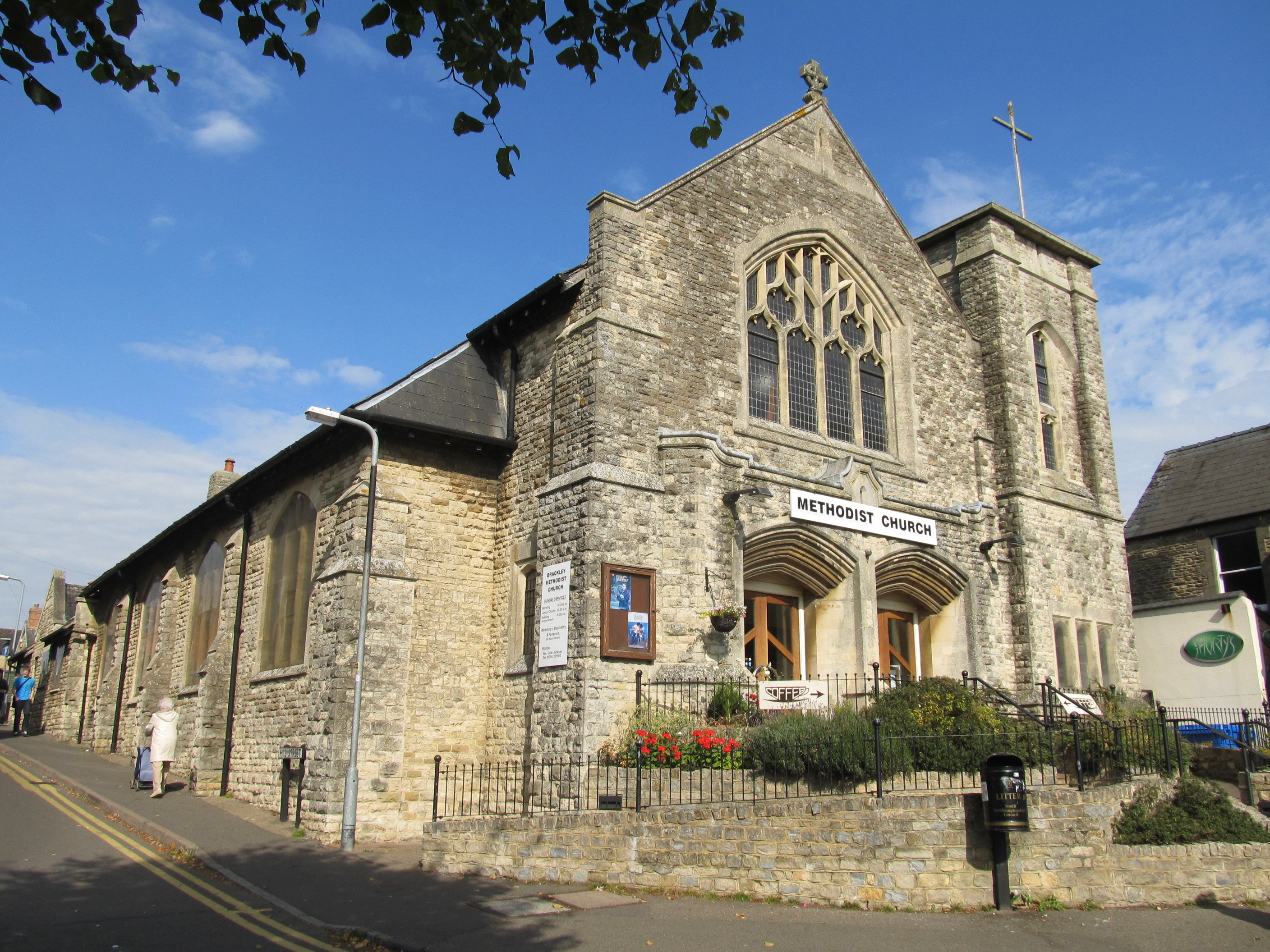
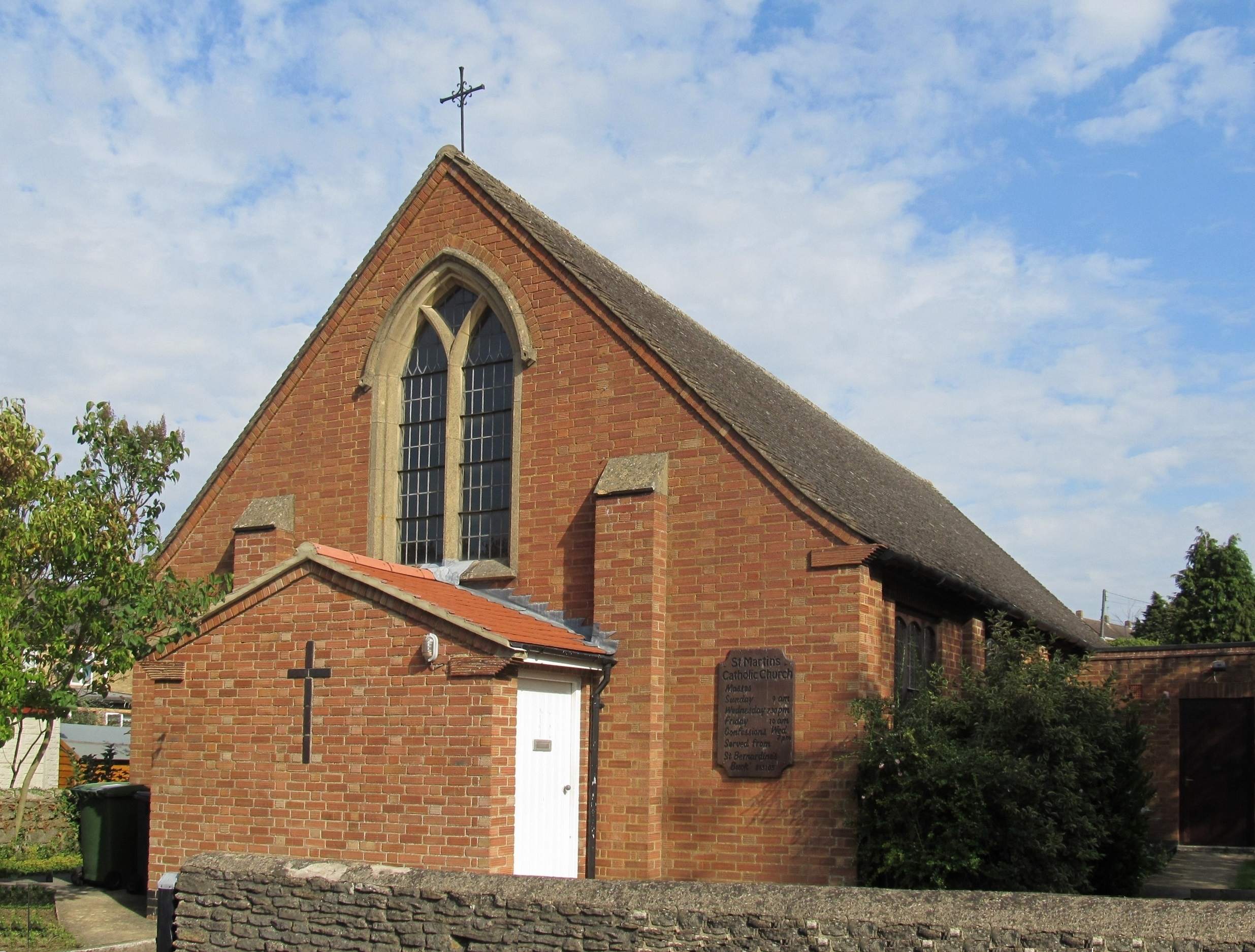
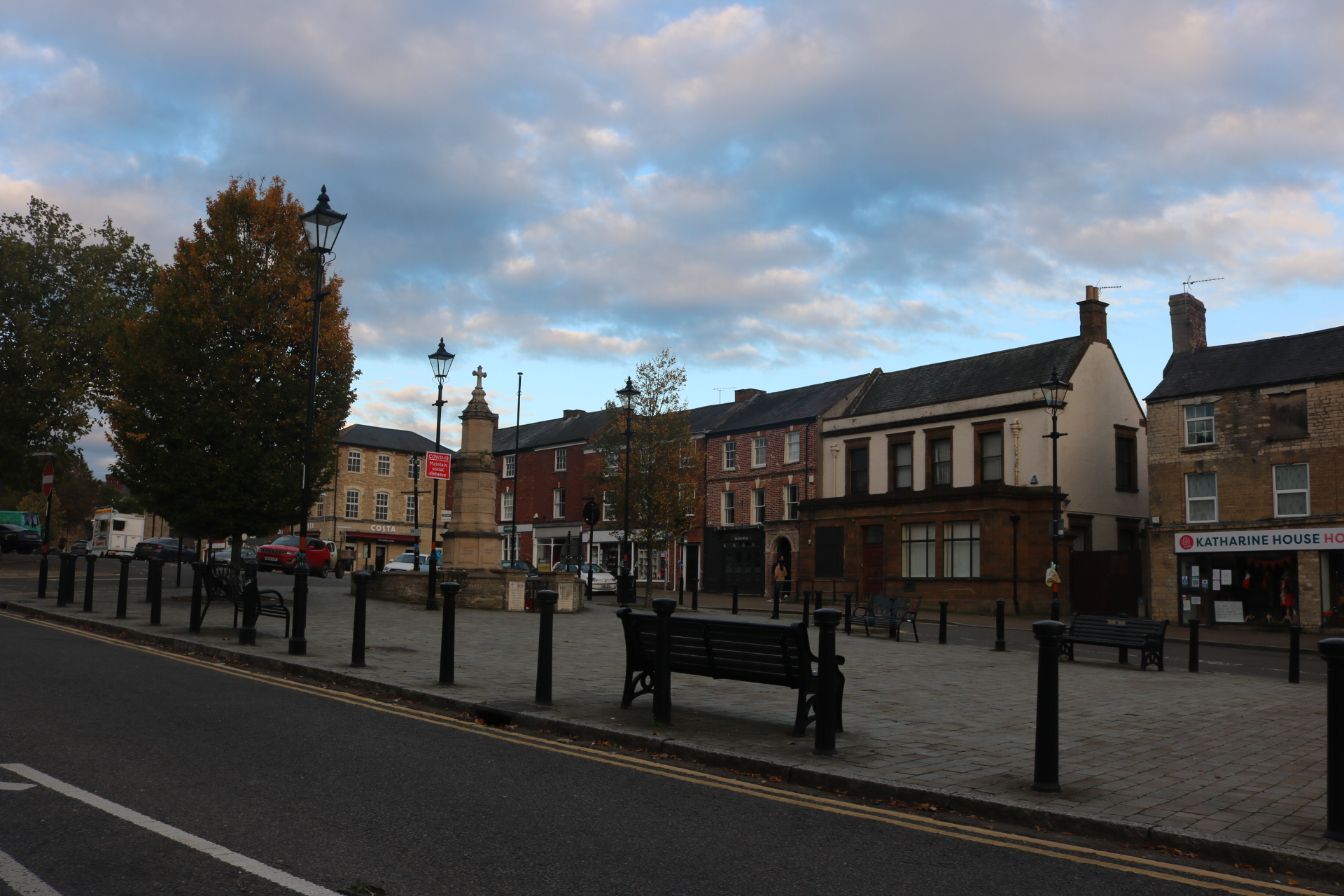
- Brackley Town Hall Banbury Road Brackley Methodist Church St Martin's Catholic Church Market Place

- Location within Northamptonshire
- Population: 16,195 (2021 Census)
- OS grid reference: SP5837
  - London: 63 miles (101 km) SE
- Civil parish: Brackley
- Unitary authority: West Northamptonshire
- Ceremonial county: Northamptonshire
- Region: East Midlands
- Country: England
- Sovereign state: United Kingdom
- Post town: BRACKLEY
- Postcode district: NN13
- Dialling code: 01280
- Police: Northamptonshire
- Fire: Northamptonshire
- Ambulance: East Midlands
- UK Parliament: South Northamptonshire
- Website: Brackley Town Council

Brackley is a market town and civil parish in the West Northamptonshire unitary authority area of Northamptonshire, England. It lies on the borders with Oxfordshire and Buckinghamshire, 9 miles (14 km) east-south-east of Banbury, 19 miles (31 km) north-north-east of Oxford and 22 miles (35 km) south-west of Northampton. Historically a market town based on the wool and lace trade, it was built on the intersecting trade routes between London, Birmingham, the Midlands, Cambridge and Oxford. Brackley is close to Silverstone and home to the Mercedes AMG Petronas F1 Team. In 2021, the parish had a population of 16,195.

== History ==
The place-name 'Brackley' is first attested in the Domesday Book of 1086, where it appears as Brachelai. It appears as Brackelea in 1173 and as Brackeley in the Pipe Rolls in 1230. The name means 'Bracca's glade or clearing'. Brackley was held in 1086 by Earl Alberic, after which it passed to the Earl of Leicester, and to the families of De Quincy and Roland.

In the 11th and 12th centuries, Brackley was in the Hundred of Odboldistow and in the Manor of Halse. Richard I (The Lionheart) named five official sites for jousting tournaments so that such events could not be used as local wars, and Brackley was one of these. The tournament site is believed to be to the south of the castle where the A422 now passes.

The town was the site of an important meeting between the barons and representatives of the King in 1215, the year of Magna Carta. It required King John to proclaim rights, respect laws and accept that the King's wishes were subject to law. It explicitly protected certain rights of the King's subjects, whether freemen, serfs, slaves or prisoners—most notably allowing appeal against unlawful imprisonment. King John and the barons were to have signed Magna Carta at Brackley Castle, but they eventually did so at Runnymede.

Market day was on Sundays until 1218, when it was changed to Wednesdays. It is now on Friday mornings.

The Tudor antiquary John Leland visited Brackley, where he learned 'a Lord of the Towne' named Neville had (at an uncertain point in the past) had the parish vicar murdered. This he had done by having the man buried alive. The writer Daniel Codd observed that in the grounds of St Peter's Church, a human-shaped stone effigy is sometimes pointed out as being connected with the event.

In 1597, the town was incorporated by Elizabeth I. It had a mayor, six aldermen and 26 burgesses.

In 1602, the metaphysical poet John Donne was elected as Member of Parliament for the constituency of Brackley.

Brackley used to be known for wool and lace-making. It had 20 houses in the 18th century. In August 1882, the Brackley Lawn Tennis Club organised the Brackley LTC Tournament, as part of the Brackley Show.

In 1901, the population of the town was 2,467. From 1974 to 2021, it was part of the South Northamptonshire district.

=== Brackley Poor Law Union ===
Brackley used the poor house at Culworth until 1834, when Parliament passed the Poor Law Amendment Act and, as a result, Brackley Poor Law Union was founded. A workhouse for 250 people was built in 1836, south-west of the town on Banbury Road. It was demolished in the 1930s.

== Notable buildings ==
=== Castle ===
Brackley Castle was built soon after 1086. Its earthwork remains lie between Hinton Road and Tesco. It comprised a motte mound 10 feet (3.0 m) high and approximately 44 yards (40 m) in diameter with an outer bailey to the east. Archaeological excavation has revealed evidence of a ditch defining the perimeter of the bailey. Two fishponds originally lay outside the ditch but have subsequently been infilled – however south of St. James Lake may have formed a part of this. Brackley Castle may have gone out of use in 1147. It was destroyed between 1173 (when the then lord of the manor, the Earl of Leicester, Robert le Blancmain, fell out with Henry II) and 1217 (when the Earl of Winchester, Blancmain's heir, was on the losing side against Henry III during the First Barons' War. The site was later granted to the Hospital of SS. James and John.

=== Parish church ===
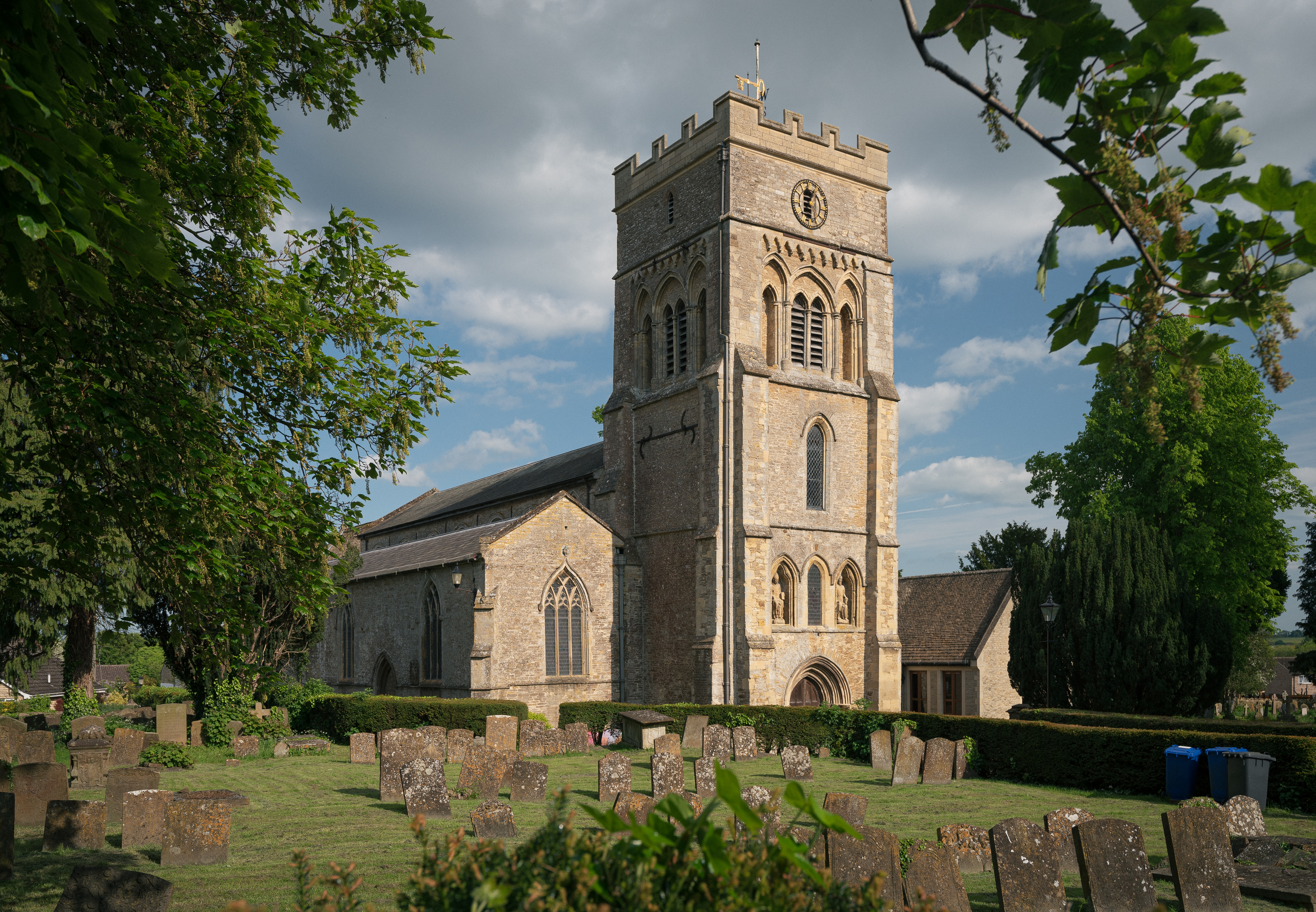
St. Peter's Church in 2023

The oldest part of the Church of England parish church of Saint Peter at the eastern end of the town centre is an 11th-century Norman south doorway. Both the four-bay arcade of the south aisle and the west tower with its niches containing seated statues were added in the 13th century. Next the chancel was rebuilt, probably late in the 13th century. The north arcade and the windows in both the north and south aisles were probably added early in the 14th century, about the same time as the Decorated Gothic chapel was added to the chancel.

=== Medieval hospitals ===
In about 1150, Robert de Beaumont, 2nd Earl of Leicester founded the Hospital of St. James and St. John. Its master was a priest, assisted by a number of religious brothers. Its duties included providing accommodation and care for poor travellers. In the 15th century there were complaints that successive masters were absentees, holding other livings at the same time as being in charge of the hospital. The hospital was closed in 1423 for maladministration but re-established in 1425. In 1449, a master was appointed who seems to have continued the practice of non-residence while holding parish livings elsewhere. In 1484 the patron, Viscount Lovell granted control of the hospital to William Waynflete, Bishop of Winchester, citing its failure to give hospitality and alms.

Waynflete had founded Magdalen College, Oxford in 1458 and Magdalen College School, Oxford in 1480. He made the former hospital part of their property and by 1548 it was Magdalen College School, Brackley. St James' chapel became the school chapel, in which use it remains today. It is the oldest building in Great Britain in continuous use by a school. The oldest part of the chapel is the west doorway, which is late Norman. Most of its windows are slightly later, being Early English Gothic lancet windows. The trio of stepped lancets above the west doorway are late 13th century. The Gothic Revival architect Charles Buckeridge restored the chapel in 1869–70.

The Hospital of St. Leonard was a smaller institution, founded to care for lepers. It was 1/2 mile (800 m) from SS. James and John, apparently on the northern edge of Brackley. It was in existence by 1280. After 1417 it shared the same master as SS. James and John and thereafter there is no separate record of St. Leonard's, so the larger hospital may have taken it over. No buildings of St. Leonard's hospital have survived.

=== Secular buildings ===
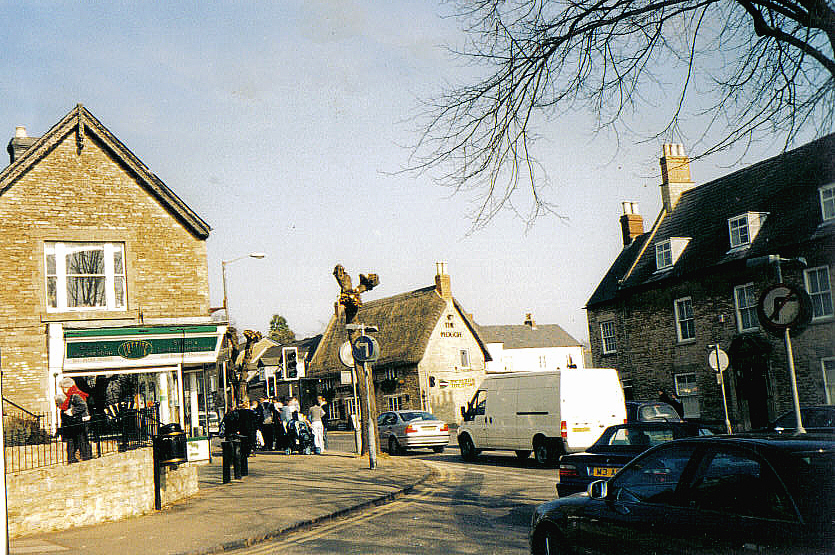
The junction with Buckingham Road and High Street, Brackley in 2004

The almshouses were founded in 1633 by Sir Thomas Crewe of Steane. They have one storey plus attic dormers. They were originally six houses but, by 1973, they had been converted into four apartments.

Brackley Manor House was also a 17th-century Jacobean building that also originally had one storey plus attic dormers. In 1875–78, the Earl of Ellesmere had it rebuilt on a larger scale, in the same style but retaining only the doorway and one window of the original building. It is now Winchester House School, a coeducational preparatory school for children aged from 3–13. It used to be a Woodard School.

Brackley Town Hall is Georgian, built in 1706 by the 4th Earl of Bridgewater. The ground floor was originally open but has since been enclosed. Market Place and Bridge Street feature a number of other early 18th-century houses and inns, mostly of brick and in several cases combining red and blue bricks in a chequer pattern.

The town park belongs to the National Trust, which hosts the Folk in the Park festival.

== Transport ==
=== Roads ===
Brackley is close to the A43 road, which bypasses the town and links it to Towcester and Northampton to the north-east and the M40 motorway to the west. The A422 links it to Banbury and Buckingham.

=== Buses ===
Brackley is served predominantly by Stagecoach in Oxfordshire, Stagecoach Midlands and Red Rose Travel; they operate routes that connect the town with Banbury, Bicester (500), Buckingham (131, B1, B2, B12), Silverstone, Towcester and Northampton (88, X88).

=== Railways ===
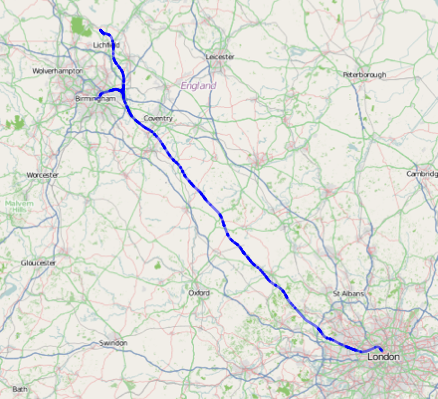
Approximate route of the London-Birmingham section of HS2 based on the official description. It will pass just south and west of Southam and through Brackley.

The nearest railway stations to Brackley are at Kings Sutton, about 6 miles (10 km) west of the town, and Banbury, around 8 miles (13 km) away. A bus service links Brackley town centre to Banbury station.

Brackley had two railway stations, but these were both closed in the 1960s:

- Brackley Town opened in May 1850, as part of the Buckinghamshire Railway's Buckingham and Brackley Junction line between Verney Junction and Banbury Merton Street, via Buckingham. The London and North Western Railway operated the line from the beginning and absorbed the Buckinghamshire Railway Company in 1879. British Railways withdrew passenger trains from the line through Brackley Town station in January 1961 and closed the line to freight in 1966.
- Brackley Central opened in March 1899 on the Great Central Main Line, which was the last main line to be built between northern England and London. The line included Brackley Viaduct across the Ouse Valley south-east of the town, which was 255 yards (233 m) in length, 62 feet (19 m) high, had 20 brick arches and two girder spans. British Rail withdrew passenger trains from the line through Brackley Central in September 1966. Brackley Viaduct was demolished in sections early in 1978.

Chiltern Railways is said to want to restore services between London Marylebone and Rugby along the former Great Central Main Line. This would have Brackley Central station reopen, with direct services to London, Aylesbury and Rugby. However, the Department for Transport has chosen part of the former Great Central route north-west of Brackley as part of the new High Speed 2 line between London and Birmingham. A station at Brackley is not currently proposed.

== Industry ==
Brackley is near the Silverstone motor racing circuit, and has some industry related to Formula One racing, notably Mercedes-AMG Petronas F1 Team (formerly Brawn GP, Honda, British American Racing and Tyrrell) which is based in the town, and the Aston Martin F1 team which operates a wind tunnel on the former site of the north railway station yard. On the east outskirts of the town was H. Bronnley & Co., makers of hand-made soaps who hold Royal Warrants of Appointment for supplying Queen Elizabeth II and King Charles III.

== Schools ==
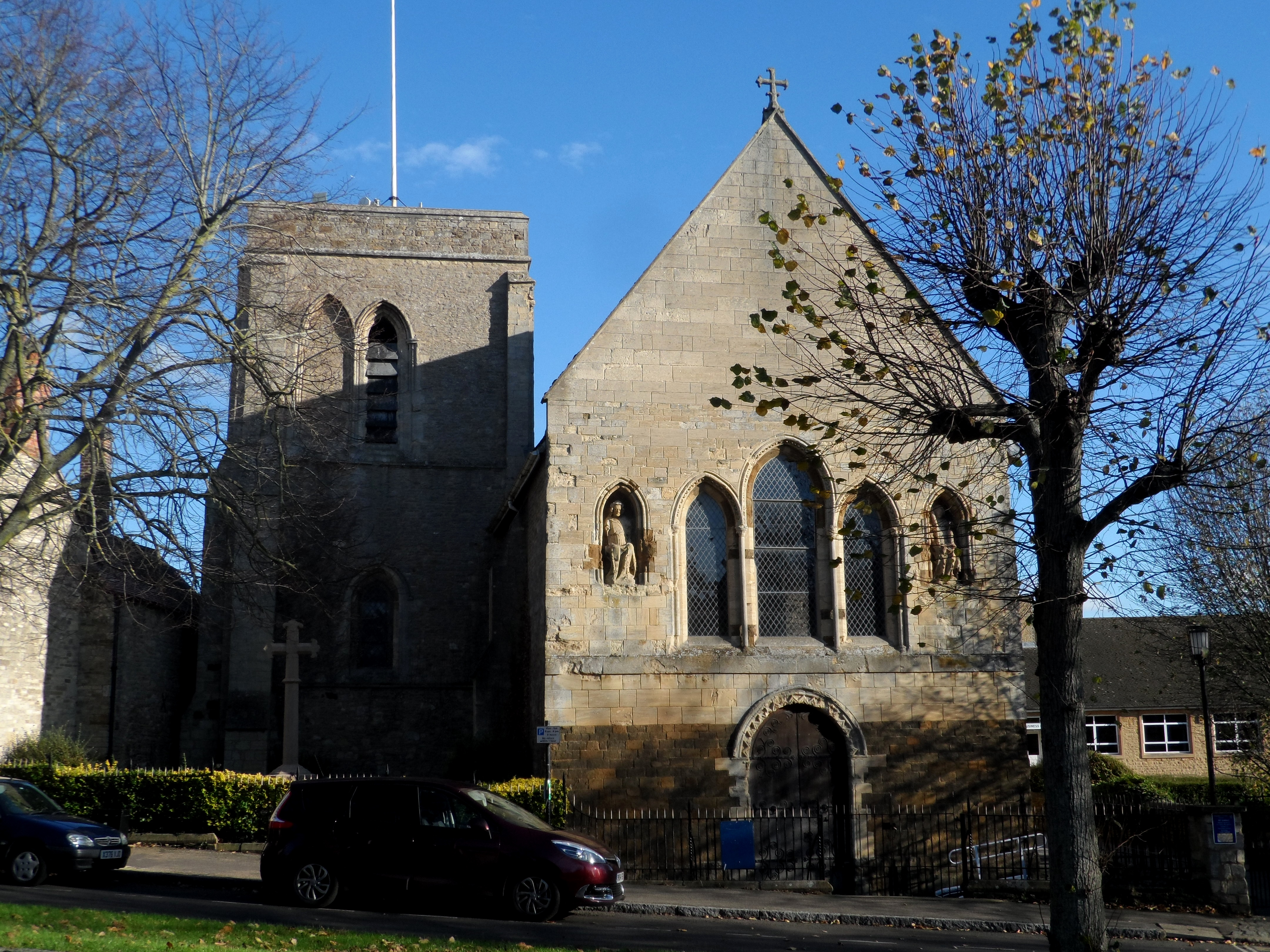
Magdalen College School chapel

Brackley has four primary schools: Bracken Leas, Southfield Primary Academy, The Radstone Primary School and Brackley Junior School. The town also has Waynflete Infants' School, most of whose pupils progress to Brackley Church of England Junior School. There is a private pre-prep/prep school for 3- to 13-year-olds, Winchester House. Magdalen College School, Brackley is the comprehensive secondary school for the town and surrounding villages.

== Media ==
Local news and television programmes is provided by BBC South and ITV Meridian. Television signals in the town are received from the Oxford TV transmitter. The town is served by both BBC Radio Oxford and BBC Radio Northampton. Other radio stations including Heart South, Capital Midlands and 3Bs Radio that broadcasts from Buckingham. Local newspapers are the Banbury Guardian and Northampton Chronicle.

== Morris dancing ==
The Brackley Morris Men are one of only seven 'traditional Cotswold' sides remaining in England, and the only one to survive in Northamptonshire. Their history dates back to the 1600s when a solid silver communion plate was given to the parish. The plate, which is still in the possession of St Peter's Church, is dated 1623 and is inscribed with the names of seven men, whom local folklore believes to have been the Morris dancers. In 1725, the men were paid half a guinea to dance at the Whitsun Ale at Aynho House. In 1766 their 'Squire' was arrested in Oxford for his insolence and committed to Bridewell as a vagrant. In 1866, an article in the Oxford Chronicle reported on their performance in Banbury, describing their 'many coloured ribbons and other gaudy finery', and the 'witless buffoonery' of their 'fool'. The side still performs today.

== Sport and leisure ==
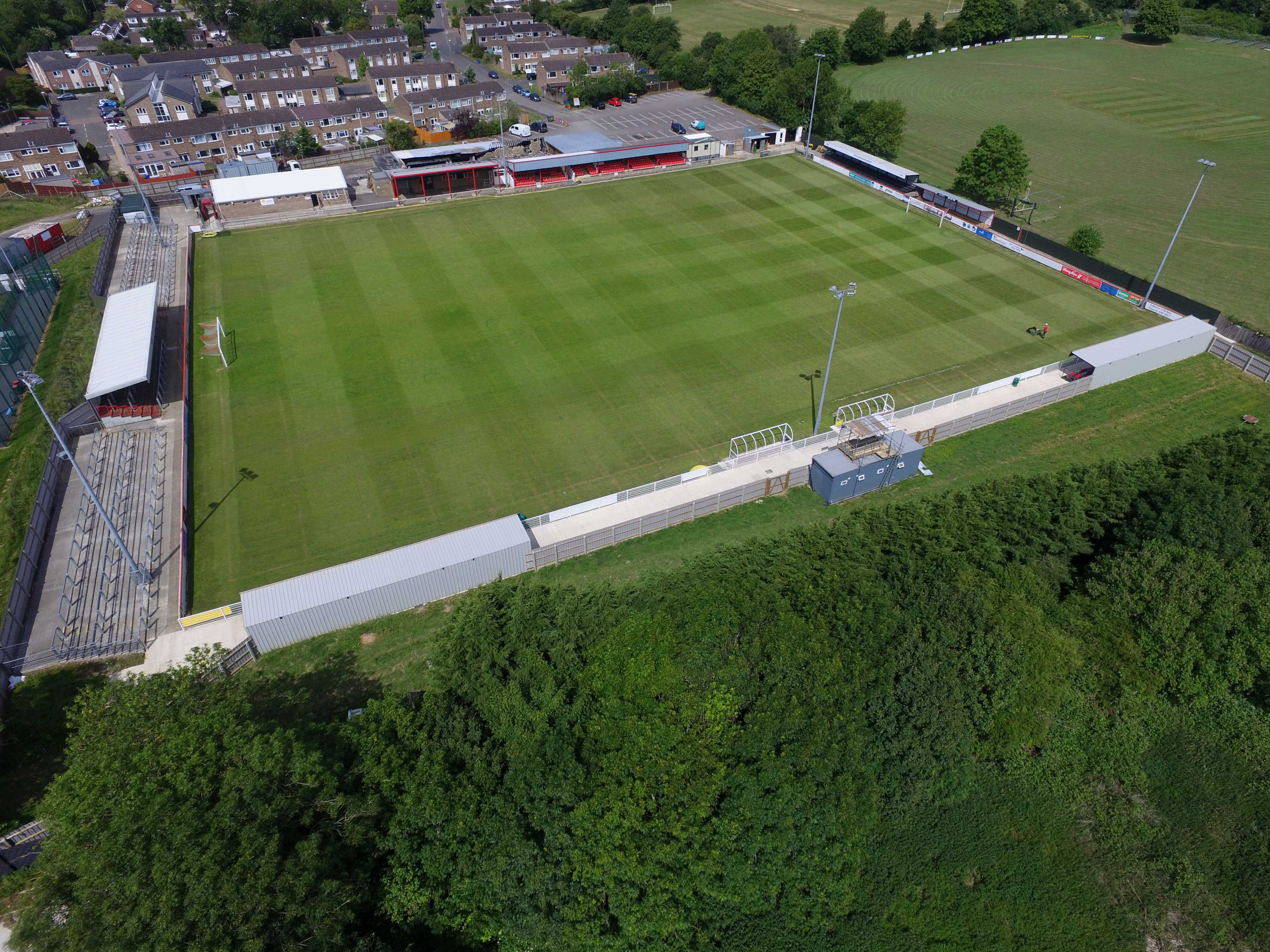
St James Park

=== Football ===
Brackley Town Football Club, known as the Saints, play in National League. Its finest season was in 2013–14 when it reached the FA Cup Second Round having beaten League One side Gillingham 1–0 in a First round replay following a 1–1 draw. Brackley Town's ground is St James Park. They won the FA Trophy in 2018, this being the first time in the club's history. In the 2024–25 season, they were crowned champions of the National League North and will play in the National League for the first time in the 2025–26 season

Brackley Sports Football Club first team plays in the North Bucks and District League Premier Division and its reserve team plays in the North Bucks and District League Intermediate Division. It also has a ladies' team that plays in the Northants Women's League.

Brackley Athletic Football Club is a junior football club affiliated with the Northamptonshire Football Association. It plays in three leagues: the under 7s–10s are in the Milton Keynes & District Junior Sevens League, the under 11s–16s are in the Milton Keynes & Border Counties League and the girls' team is in the Oxford Girls' Football League.

=== Motorsport ===
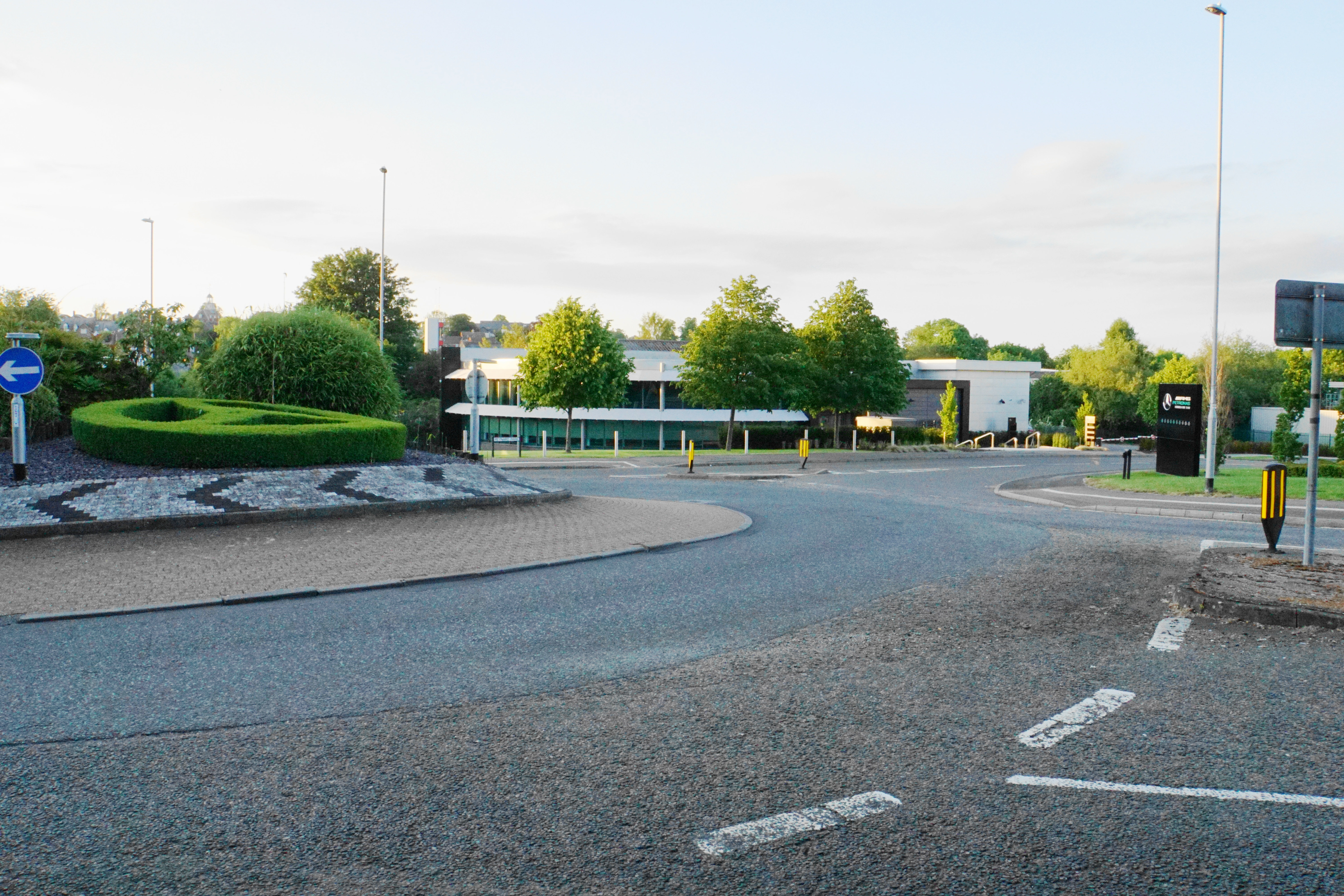
Entrance to Mercedes-AMG PETRONAS F1 Team headquarters

Brackley is also the home of F1 team Mercedes AMG Petronas having had Brawn GP, who were bought out by Mercedes-Benz in 2009. Honda F1 and BAR, who were bought out by Honda in 2006 were previously based in Brackley. It was also the home of the Mercedes-EQ Formula E Team.

=== Other clubs and facilities ===
Brackley Netball Club has two teams in the Milton Keynes league and 1 team in the Cherwell league. The 1st team, known as “Falcons”, play in the premier league and the 2nd team, known as “Eagles”, play in division 3. They also have a junior side, with all teams training at the local Magdalen School.

Brackley Cricket Club runs two Saturday teams and a Mid-week team, as well as Kwik Cricket and Junior teams. They play in the Cherwell Cricket League and play at Brackley Cricket Club Ground.

Brackley Rugby Union Football Club currently plays in the English Rugby Union Midland Division's Counties 2 Midlands East (South) League. It hosts two senior sides and a number of teams in the junior section.

Brackley has a tennis club, a leisure centre and swimming pool, a martial arts academy and a badminton club.

South of the town is St. James lake, a balancing lake of almost 3 acres (1 ha) created in 1977. Fishing in the lake is managed by a local angling club. The lake is in a 5 acres (2 ha) wildlife park that is open to the public.

== Twinned towns ==
Brackley is twinned with:

- Les Pavillons-sous-Bois, Île-de-France, France
- Montabur, Rhineland-Palatinate, Germany

Brackley has been twinned with Les Pavillons-sous-Bois since 1972. Following this, in 1975, the town council reached a similar arrangement with Montabur. The town's twinning relationship is run by the local volunteer group the Brackley European Association. In 2025 Brackley celebrated 50 years of being twinned with Montabur. This occasion was marked with in Brackley with a 5 course meal, local events and the exchange of gifts. The town was presented with a slate stand made with local materials from Montabur, and in return gave a wooden plaque.
