= Litchborough =

Village in Northamptonshire, England

Coordinates: 52.1850°N 1.0800°W

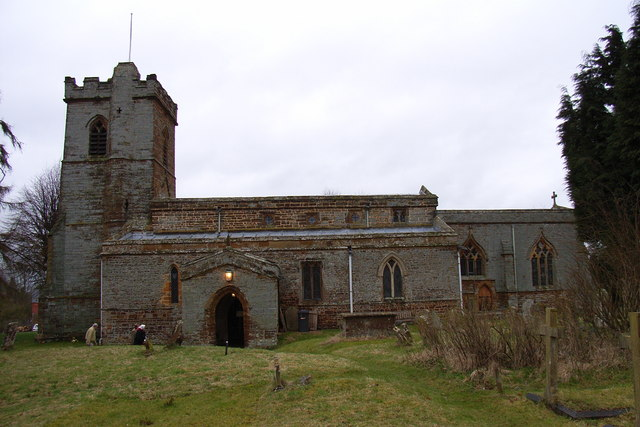
- St Martin's Church, Litchborough

- Location within Northamptonshire
- Population: 300 (2001 census); 321 (2011 census)
- OS grid reference: SP6254
  - London: 69 miles (111 km)
- Unitary authority: West Northamptonshire
- Ceremonial county: Northamptonshire
- Region: East Midlands
- Country: England
- Sovereign state: United Kingdom
- Post town: Towcester
- Postcode district: NN12
- Dialling code: 01327
- Police: Northamptonshire
- Fire: Northamptonshire
- Ambulance: East Midlands
- UK Parliament: South Northamptonshire

Litchborough is a historic village and civil parish in West Northamptonshire, England. At the time of the 2001 census, the parish's population was 300 people, increasing to 321 at the 2011 Census.

The villages name probably means, 'enclosure hill'.

The manor of Litchborough, and that of nearby Weedon Pinkney, belonged in the fourteenth century to the Wale family, and passed by descent to the Malorre family. More recently, new built housing has increased the number of dwellings to 111 and the population to 449.

It is about 4 miles (6.4 km) north-west of Towcester, 2 miles off the A5 on the Banbury Road.

The Church of England parish church is dedicated to St Martin.

The village has an active Village Hall and a pub, the Old Red Lion.

The village has a well supported Parish Council chaired by Tim Sykes of the Old Rectory, a businessman who chaired the hostel sector hospitality company Beds & Bars. Gareth Lugar-Mawson, a retired High Court Judge who has served in Hong Kong and Brunei, also serves on the Parish Council.

There is an informative village community website - litchborough.org.uk - with local news, details of events and Parish Council information.

== Litchborough Hall ==
Litchborough Hall is the home of Bob Heygate, who was High Sheriff of Northamptonshire in 1997 and who, with cousin Paul Heygate, owns and runs the landmark Heygates Mill at Bugbrooke and the Fine Lady Bakery at Banbury.

In June 1603 Lady Anne Clifford stayed at Litchborough Hall, the home of Elizabeth Nedham, who had been a member of the household of Anne Russell, Countess of Warwick. Lucy Russell, Countess of Bedford met her and they rode to Dingley Hall to meet Anne of Denmark.

The house was extensively reworked in 1838 in Tudor style by the architect George Moore.
