= Staverton, Northamptonshire =

Village in Northamptonshire, England

Coordinates: 52.246°N 1.210°W

Staverton
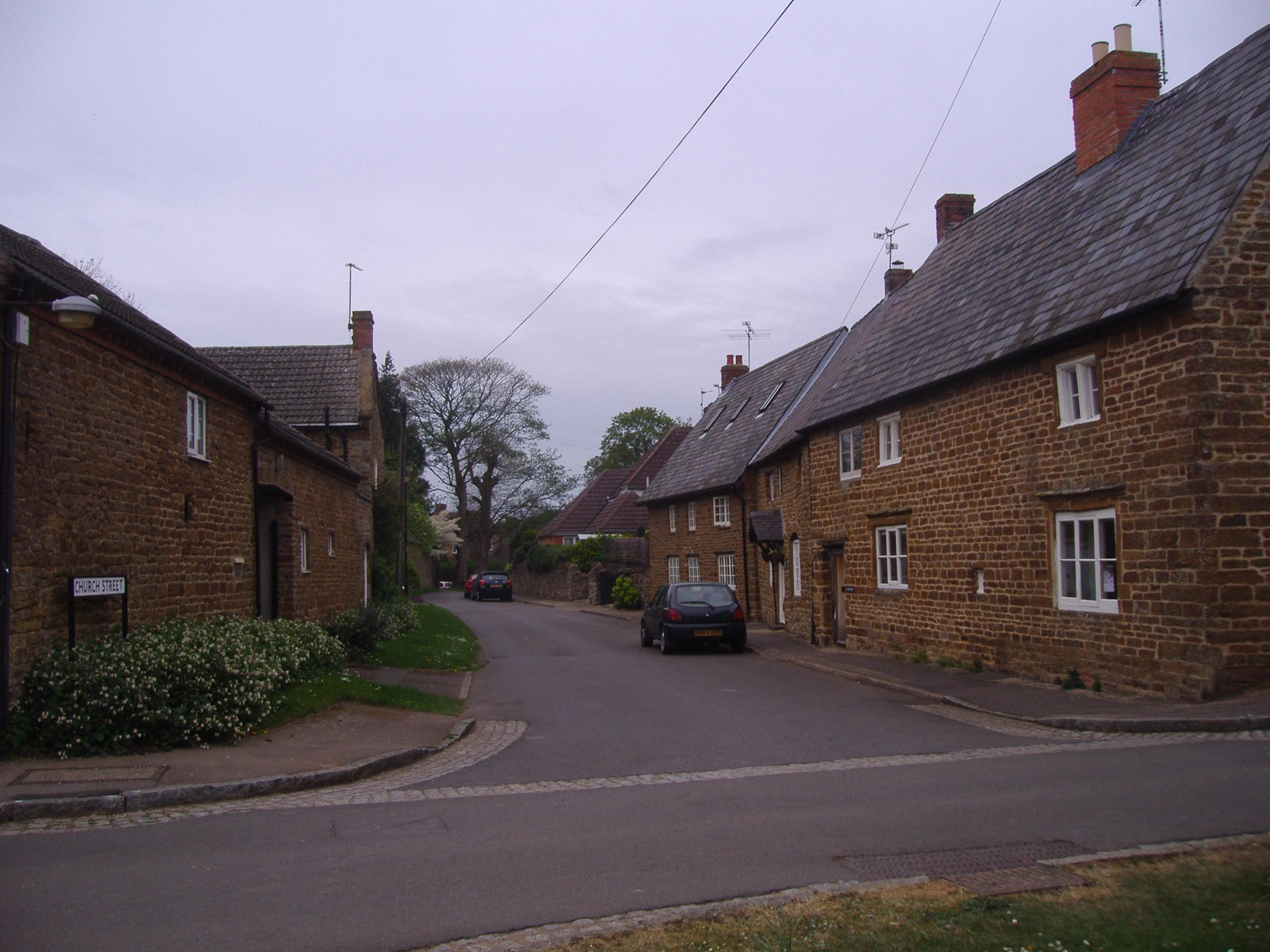

- Location within Northamptonshire
- Population: 458 (2011 Census)
- OS grid reference: SP539612
- Unitary authority: West Northamptonshire
- Ceremonial county: Northamptonshire
- Region: East Midlands
- Country: England
- Sovereign state: United Kingdom
- Post town: DAVENTRY
- Postcode district: NN11
- Dialling code: 01327
- Police: Northamptonshire
- Fire: Northamptonshire
- Ambulance: East Midlands
- UK Parliament: Daventry

Staverton is a village and civil parish in the south-west of Northamptonshire, England. It is 2.3 miles west of Daventry, 7.9 miles east of Southam and 15.3 miles east of Leamington Spa. It straddles the A425 road from Daventry to Leamington. The Jurassic Way long-distance footpath between Banbury and Stamford passes through the village.

The village sits on the edge of an escarpment and has views westward across the valley of the River Leam into the neighbouring county of Warwickshire. Both the Malvern and Shropshire hills are visible on fine days.

== History ==
The village's name means 'Stake farm/settlement', either set apart by such or where they were made or acquired.

In the Domesday Book of 1086, Staverton is mentioned as Stavertone.

Before the early part of the 18th century, the original village was located behind the church. However, in 1720 a fire broke out which caused damage, destroying many haystacks, stables, grain stores and 22 houses. The total loss was thought to be around £3,000. The result of this was that the village received, via a bequest from Elizabeth Darby, a fire engine. This came into commission in 1767, was kept in the village until quite recently and was later housed at the Daventry museum. A plaque can be seen on a door opposite the village green to this effect.

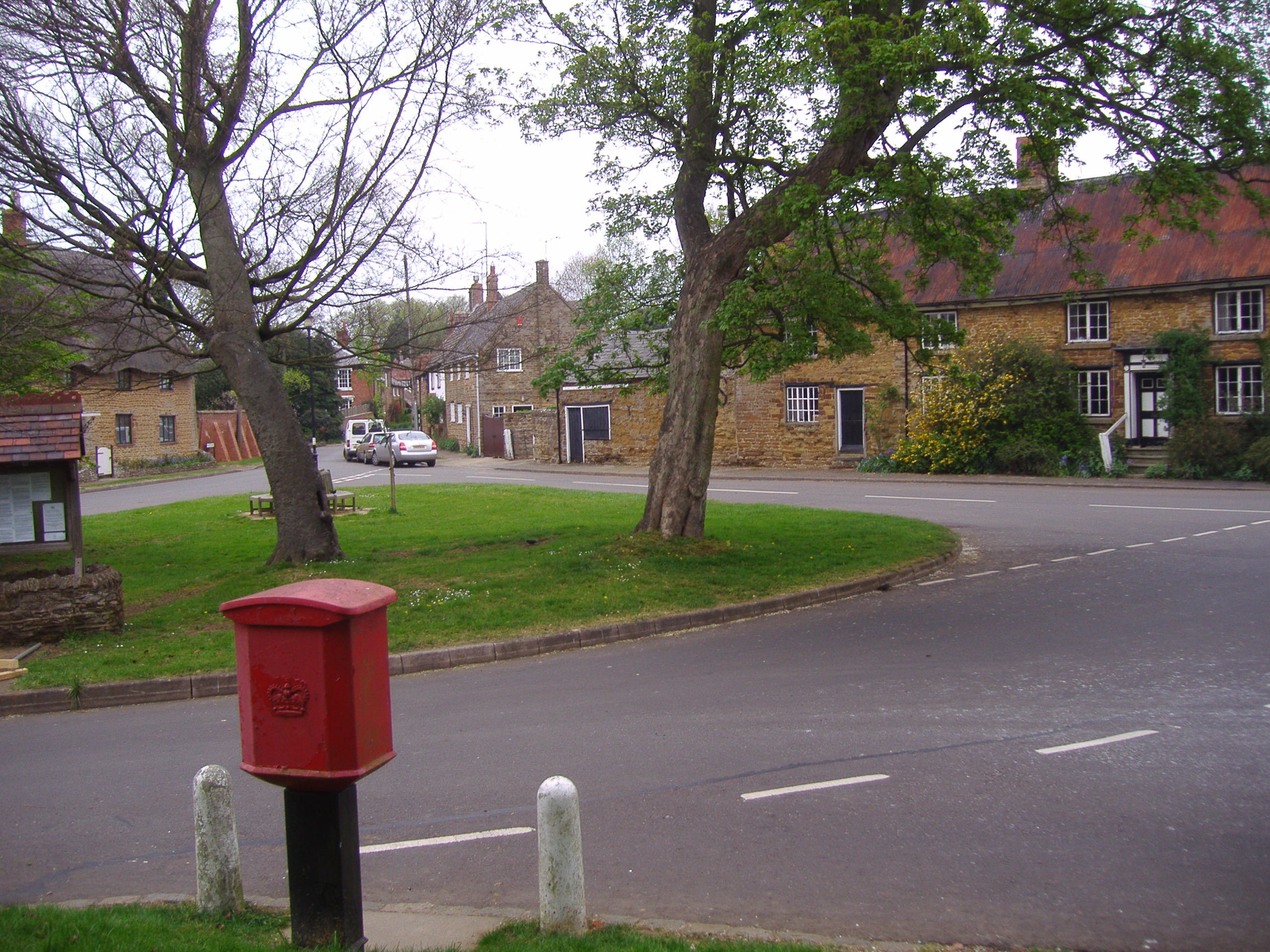
The village green

The village has a manor house, situated at the end of Manor Road and thought to have parts originating possibly from Anglo-Saxon times. It is only one of many examples of vernacular architecture in the village. There is an interesting window detail at The Stables in Manor Road. A datestone above the window reads R.R. 1684.

Within the village, Well Lane runs parallel to the main A425. It has been conjectured that this was a much earlier approach to the village. The deeply banked sides to the lane bear testimony to it being an ancient right of way. Possibly, with the increase in coaching traffic from the west, the present A425 route was chosen in preference.

Along the western boundary of the parish runs the now-disused railway, the last mainline railway to be built in Britain. It was constructed by the Great Central Railway Company between 1894 and 1899 and ran from Nottingham Victoria to London Marylebone. A mission was established for the navvies in the village in a barn situated on the corner of Manor Road and Glebe Lane. This is now part of a private residence.

== Geography ==
The average elevation of the parish is 700 ft above sea level, and approximately 1.5 miles south of the village is Arbury Hill, which, at 225 m (738 ft), is the highest point in Northamptonshire. On the summit, evidence of an Iron Age hill fort of an unusually square shape is plainly seen. The River Nene rises nearby. The Jurassic Way and the Three Rivers Circular Walk pass through the parish.

== Demography ==
Staverton parish had a population of 468 at the 2001 census, reducing slightly to 458 at the 2011 Census.

== Landmarks ==
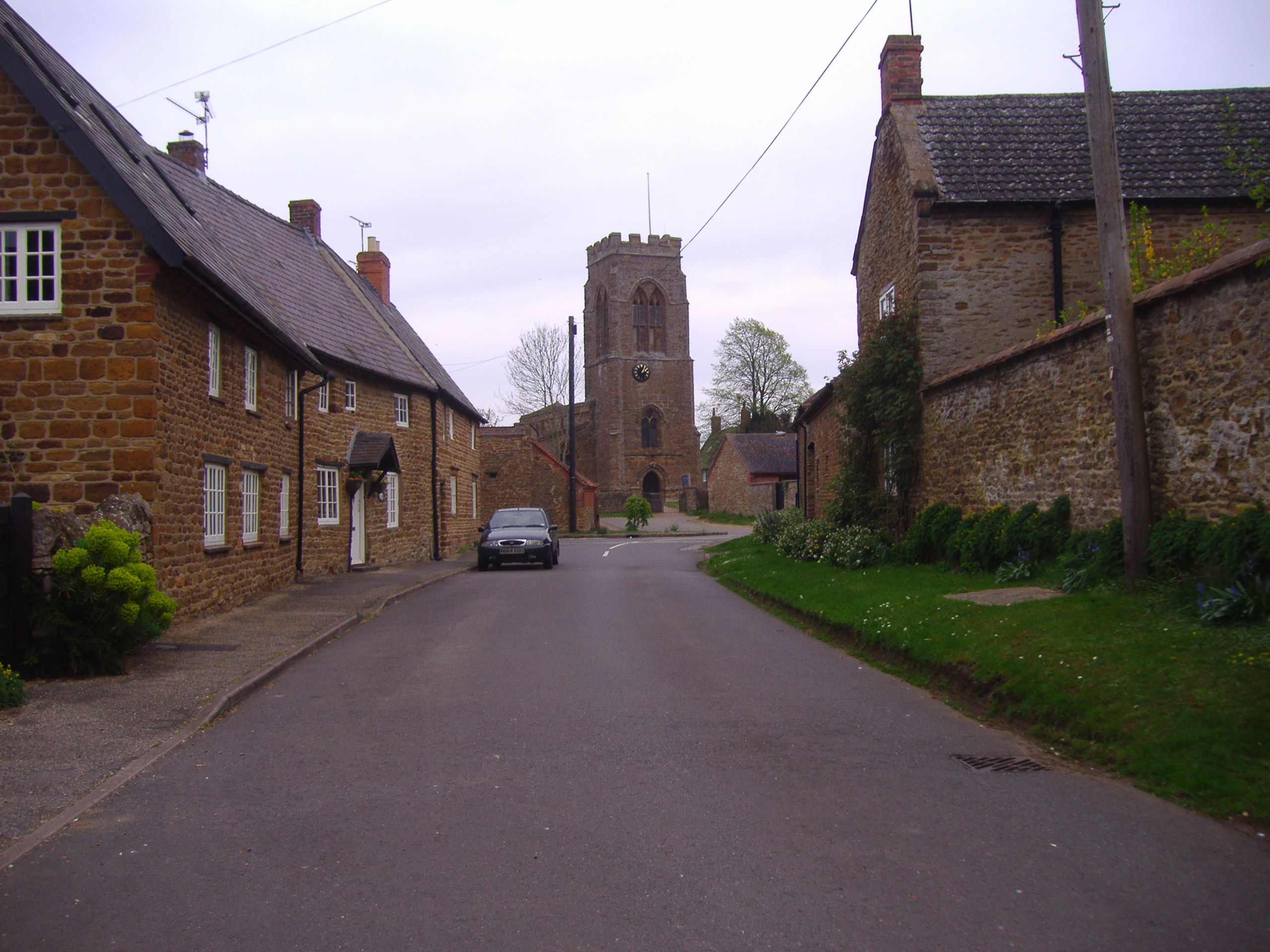
Staverton Church

St Mary the Virgin has been a site of Christian worship for well over a thousand years, although the first recorded vicar appears in records started in 1220. A board inside the church lists all subsequent vicars up to the present incumbent. The present church dates from about 1300 with some older parts. For hundreds of years before this, possibly dating back to before 800 AD, a burial ground existed on the site - as evidenced by the raised churchyard. The main structure that can be seen today dates mainly from the 14th century, although traces of older architecture still remain, such as the lancet window in the north-west corner, which is from the Norman period.

The church has many original architectural and historic features. From the top of the tower, sitting on top of one of the highest points in Northamptonshire, it is said that if one were able to travel eastwards maintaining the same altitude, one would not touch land again until reaching the Urals. The ‘new’ north porch, used as the main entrance into the church, dates back 600 years, whereas the south porch is 100 years older. The original door and roof timbers remain. The church has a peal of six bells cast in 1938 by John Taylor & Co of Loughborough. The vicar from 1933 to 1946, Rev. E.S. Powell, initiated the bell restoration; he and his wife were active bellringers.

== Transport ==
There was a bus service 65 between Leamington-Southam-Banbury, operated by Stagecoach in Warwickshire from Monday to Saturday. Since the discontinuation of the 65 route, It has been served by the 664 between Royal Leamington Spa and Daventry from Monday to Friday as part of a school route operated by Flexibus. The closest railway is the West Midlands Trains service from Long Buckby station on the Northampton loop of the West Coast Main Line. Nearby Northampton and Rugby stations are served by Avanti West Coast services, while Chiltern Railways. CrossCountry and West Midlands Trains trains can be joined at Leamington Spa or Banbury.

== Amenities ==
There is one public house, The Countryman, formerly known as the New Inn. Former Staverton pubs included The Windmill in Windmill Lane and The Crown, now a private house, opposite The Green. Across the road from the pub, there is a garage. There is a garden centre on the Badby Road out of the village. East of the village on the Daventry road is De Vere Staverton Estate, a hotel where the facilities include an indoor leisure complex and an 18-hole golf course and driving range.

The first mention of a post office in the village was in 1864, but the post office closed in March 2008.

== Image gallery ==
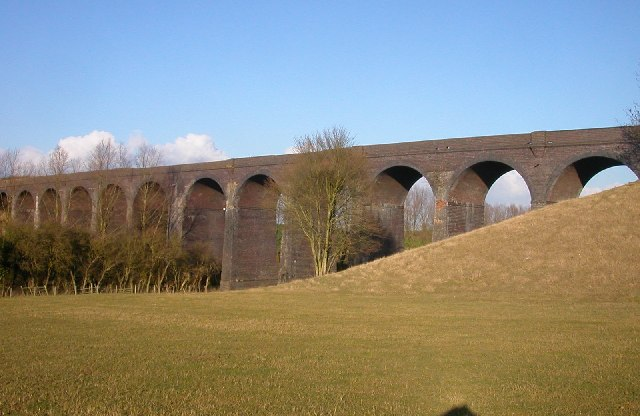
Catesby viaduct over the River Leam.

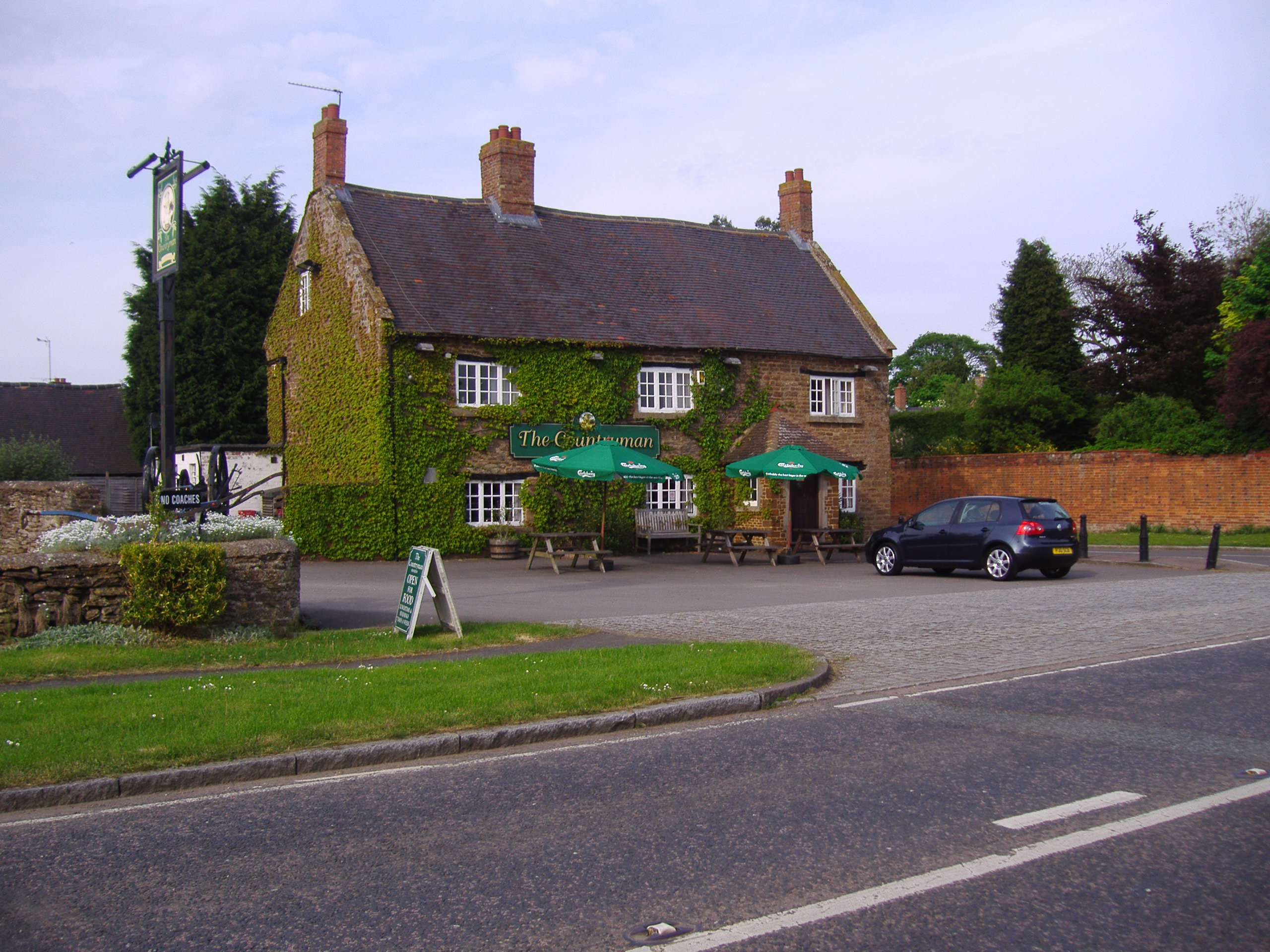
The Countryman Inn
