= Crick (surname) =

Crick is an English toponymic surname for people from Crick, Northamptonshire, recorded in the Domesday Book as Creg, derived from the Celtic word creig "rock, cliff". Notable people with the surname include:

- Bernard Crick (1929–2008), British political scientist
- Cameron Crick (born 1997), Australian racing driver
- Cuthbert Crick (1920–1991), Barbadian cricketer
- Douglas Crick (1885–1973), English bishop
- Francis Crick (1916–2004), British scientist and joint discoverer of the structure of DNA
- George Charles Crick (1856–1917), British geologist
- George Crick (1888–1982), English footballer
- Harry Crick (1910–1960), English cricketer
- Jamie Crick (1966–2023), English radio broadcaster
- Jared Crick (born 1989), American football player
- Julia Crick (born 1963), British historian, medievalist and academic
- Kyle Crick (born 1992), American baseball pitcher
- Mark Crick, British author and photographer
- Marthe Crick-Kuntziger (1891–1963), Belgian museum curator
- Michael Crick (born 1958), British journalist and biographer
- Nancy Crick (1932–2002), Australian figure from the euthanasia debate
- Nicki R. Crick (1958–2012), American psychologist and professor
- Odile Crick (1920–2007), British artist, wife of Francis Crick
- Paddy Crick (1862–1908), Australian politician
- Philip Crick (1882–1937), Australian bishop
- Roy Crick (1904–1966), Australian politician
- Stanley Crick (1888–1955), Australian politician, film producer and distributor
- Thomas Crick (1885–1970), British priest
- Tom Crick (born 1981), British computer engineer, scientist and bureaucrat
- Walter Drawbridge Crick (1857– 1903), English businessman, amateur geologist and palaeontologist

Fictional characters:

- Harold Crick, protagonist of a 2006 film Stranger than Fiction

== See also ==
- Krick
