= Krich =

Krich is a surname. Notable people with the surname include:

- Helen Krich Chinoy, née Helen Krich (1922–2010), American theater historian
- Rochelle Majer Krich (born 1947), American novelist

== See also ==
- Krick
- Rich (surname)
