= Crick =

Crick may refer to:

== Places ==
- Crick, Monmouthshire, Wales
- Crick, Northamptonshire, England
- Crick Road, Oxford, England

== People with the name ==
- Crick (surname)

== Other uses ==
- Crick, the cricket from Beat Bugs
- Francis Crick Institute, London, England, known as The Crick
- Watson and Crick, a reference to "Molecular Structure of Nucleic Acids: A Structure for Deoxyribose Nucleic Acid", a seminal article published by Francis Crick and James D. Watson in the scientific journal Nature [25 April 1953]

== See also ==
- Creek (disambiguation)
