= Cackle =

Cackle may refer to:

- A form of laughter, often an evil laughter
- Miss Cackle, a character in the novel series The Worst Witch by Jill Murphy
- Mr. Cackle, a character in the 1962 Looney Tunes cartoon The Slick Chick

== See also ==
- Cackle Street (disambiguation), three hamlets in East Sussex
- Crackle (disambiguation)
