= Long Buckby railway station =

Railway station in Northamptonshire, England

Coordinates: 52.295°N 1.086°W

Long Buckby
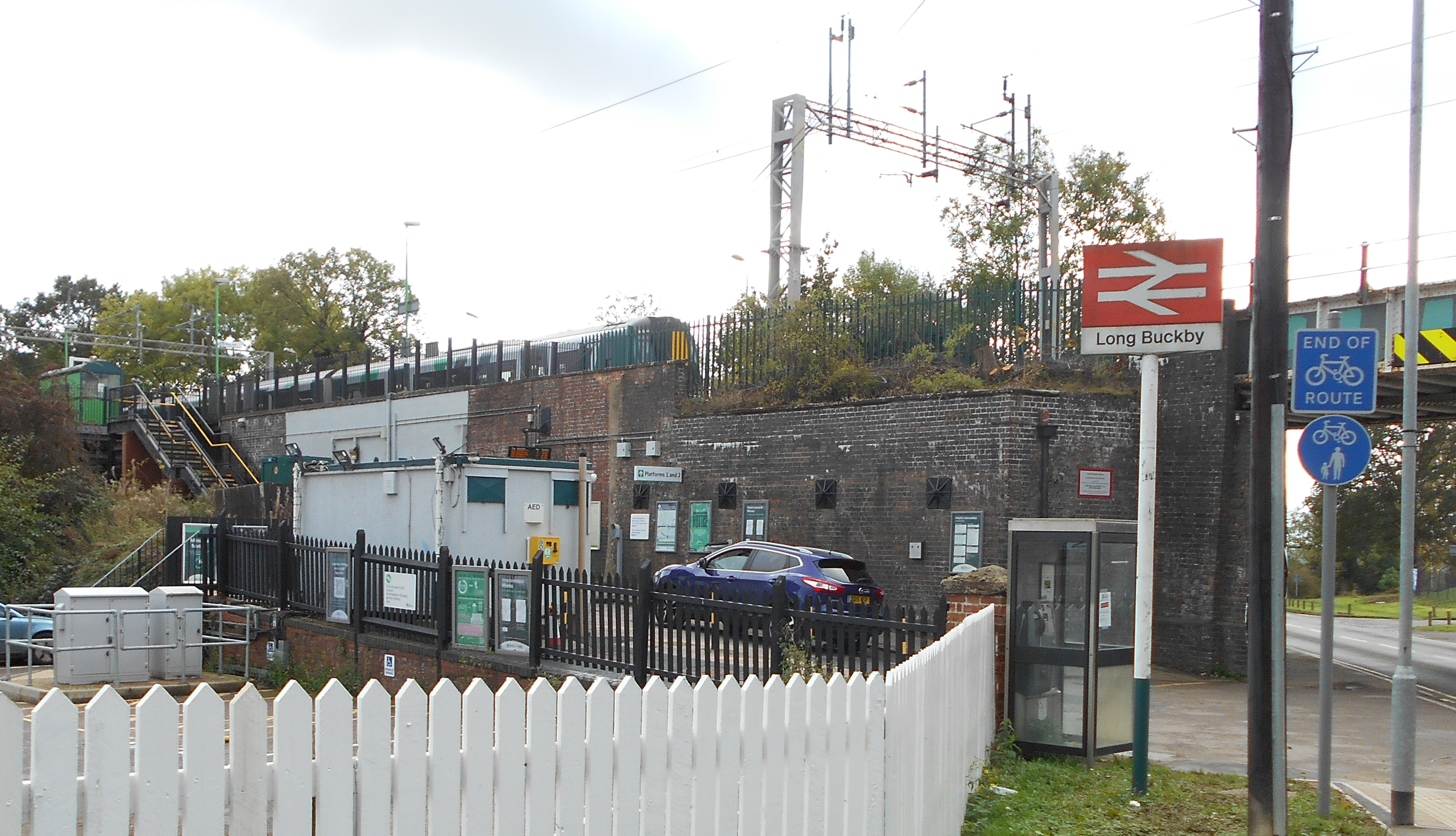
- Station exterior

General information
- Location: Long Buckby, West Northamptonshire; England
- Grid reference: SP623666
- Manager: London Northwestern Railway
- Platforms: 2

Other information
- Station code: LBK
- Classification: DfT category E

History
- Original company: London and North Western Railway
- Pre-grouping: London and North Western Railway
- Post-grouping: London, Midland and Scottish Railway

Key dates
- 1 December 1881: Station opened

Passengers
- 2021/22: ▲0.211 million
- 2022/23: ▲0.250 million
- 2023/24: ▲0.293 million
- 2024/25: ▲0.330 million
- 2025/26: ▲0.348 million
Location
Notes
- Passenger statistics from the Office of Rail and Road

Long Buckby railway station is a small railway station serving the village of Long Buckby, Northamptonshire, England. It is the nearest railway station for the larger town of Daventry, 4 miles (6.4 km) away.

The station is on the Northampton loop of the West Coast Main Line. It is served by London Northwestern Railway services to Birmingham New Street, Northampton and London Euston. For Avanti West Coast inter-city services passengers should change at Rugby, the next station to the west.

== History ==
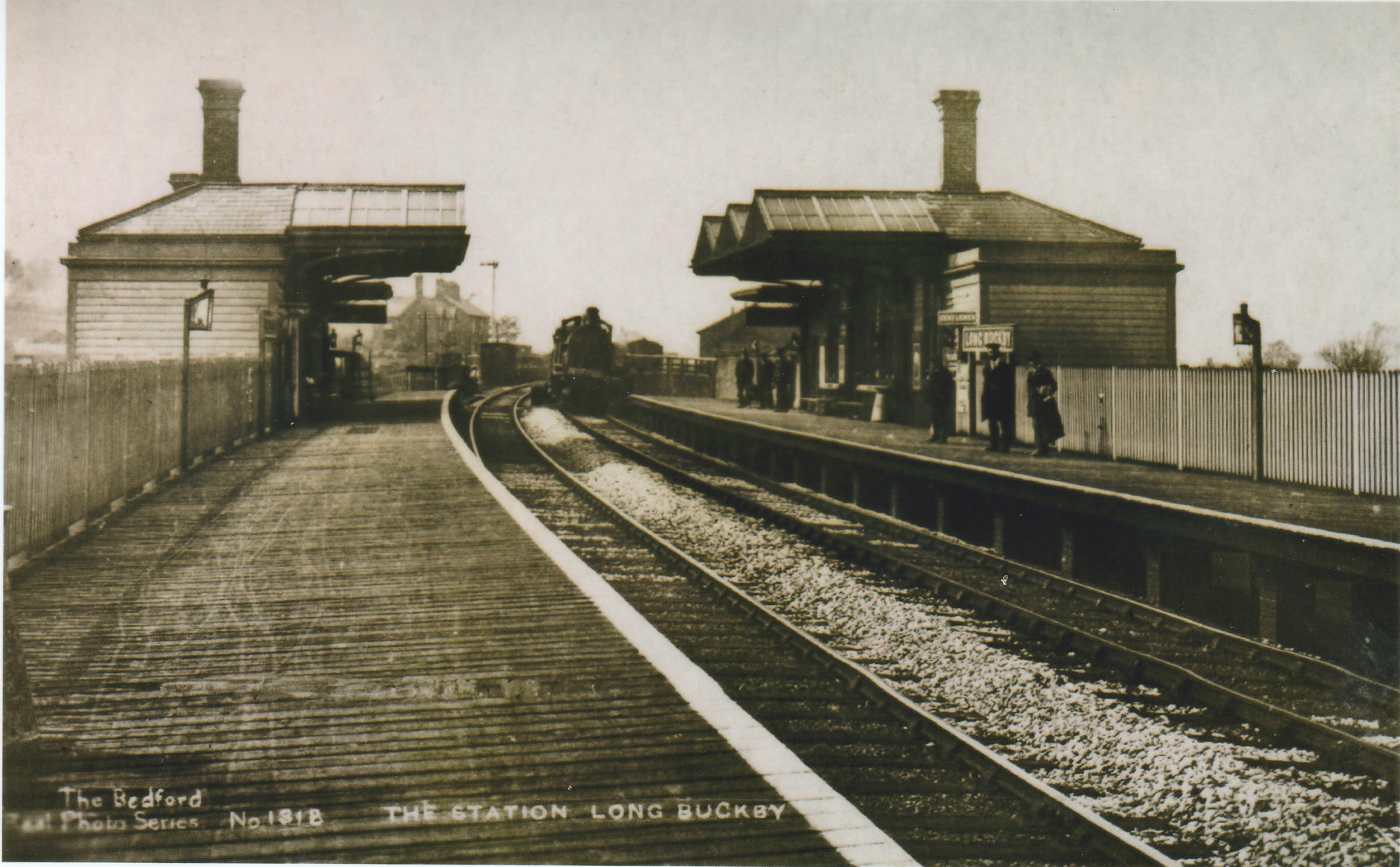
Old postcard of the station c. 1900s

The station was opened along with the line on 1 December 1881, by the London and North Western Railway, it is the only remaining station between Northampton and Rugby; three others opened on the same stretch of line (Kilsby and Crick, Althorp Park and Church Brampton) are now closed.

The original station buildings were demolished during the period of British Rail, and replaced with more basic facilities.

Since the closure of Althorp Park station in 1960, Long Buckby has been the nearest station to Althorp, the family home of the Earls Spencer. In September 1997 Long Buckby station was seen on television across the world, as it was where Charles, Prince of Wales, Prince William and Prince Harry arrived from London after the Funeral of Diana, Princess of Wales.

== Services ==
Long Buckby is served by two West Midlands Trains services per hour in each direction: i.e., two northbound to Birmingham New Street via Rugby and Coventry, and two southbound to London Euston via Northampton.

Long Buckby also receives a limited service between London Euston and Crewe from London Northwestern Railway. Most services between Euston and Crewe on London Northwestern Railway services go direct between Milton Keynes Central and Rugby, bypassing the Northampton Loop.

Preceding station	National Rail	Following station
Rugby towards Birmingham New Street	London Northwestern Railway London–Birmingham	Northampton towards London Euston
Historical railways
Kilsby and Crick Line open, station closed	London and North Western Railway Northampton Loop	Althorp Park Line open, station closed

== Facilities ==
The station platforms are above street level on an embankment, and are accessed by stairs, there are basic shelters on each platform. A cabin next to the station car park serves as a part-time ticket office, there is also a ticket machine.

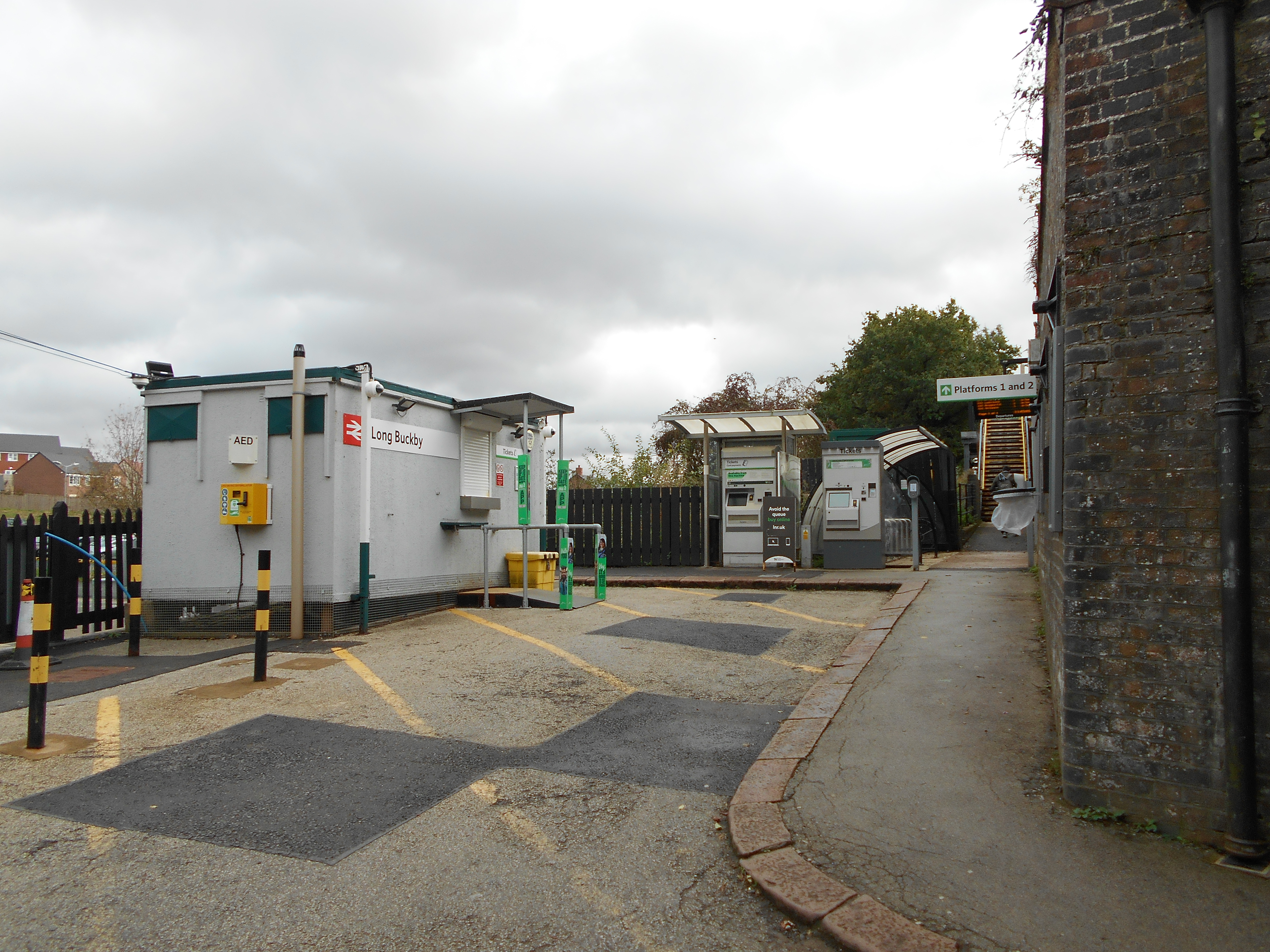
Station entrance and ticket office cabin.

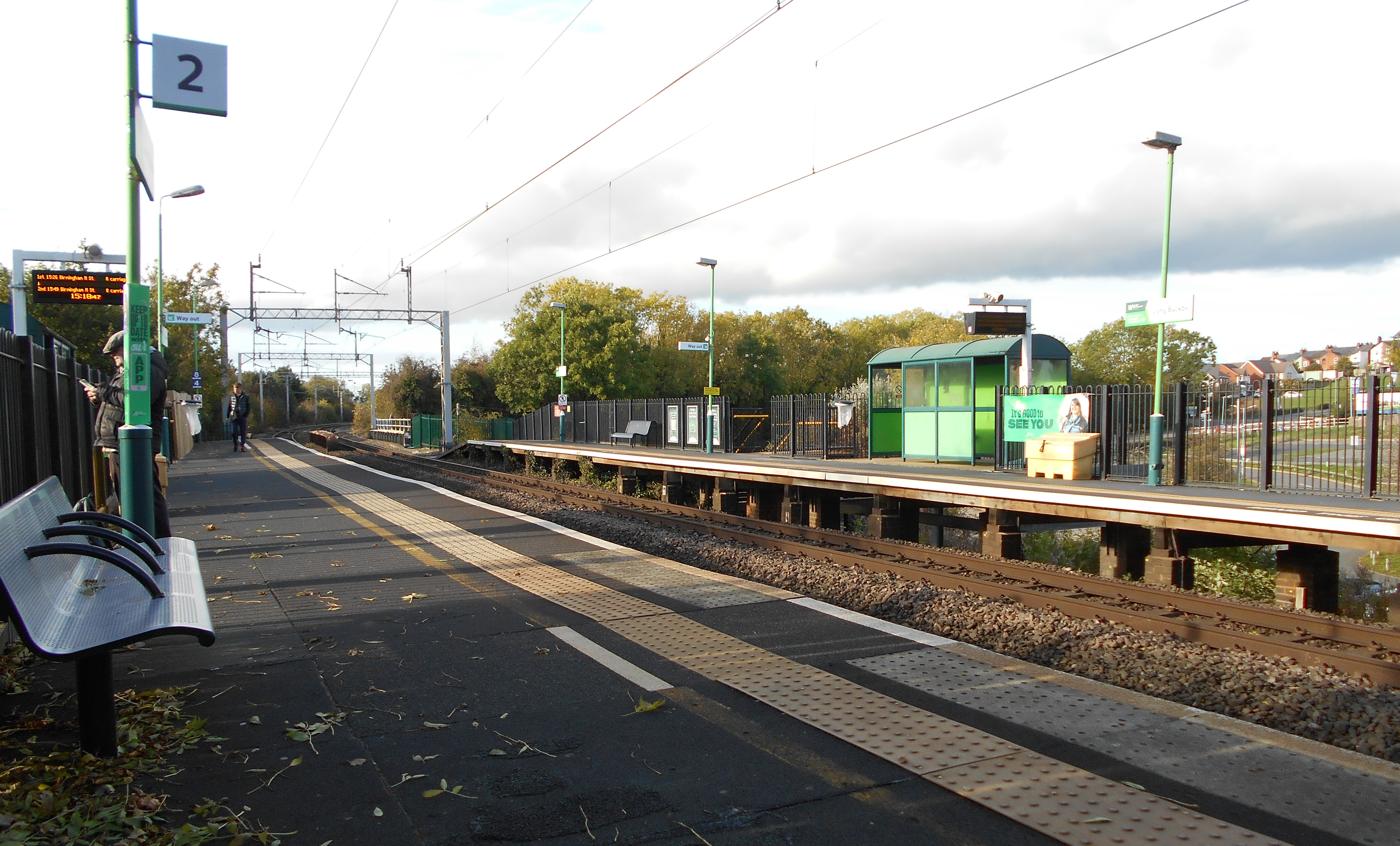
Station platforms.

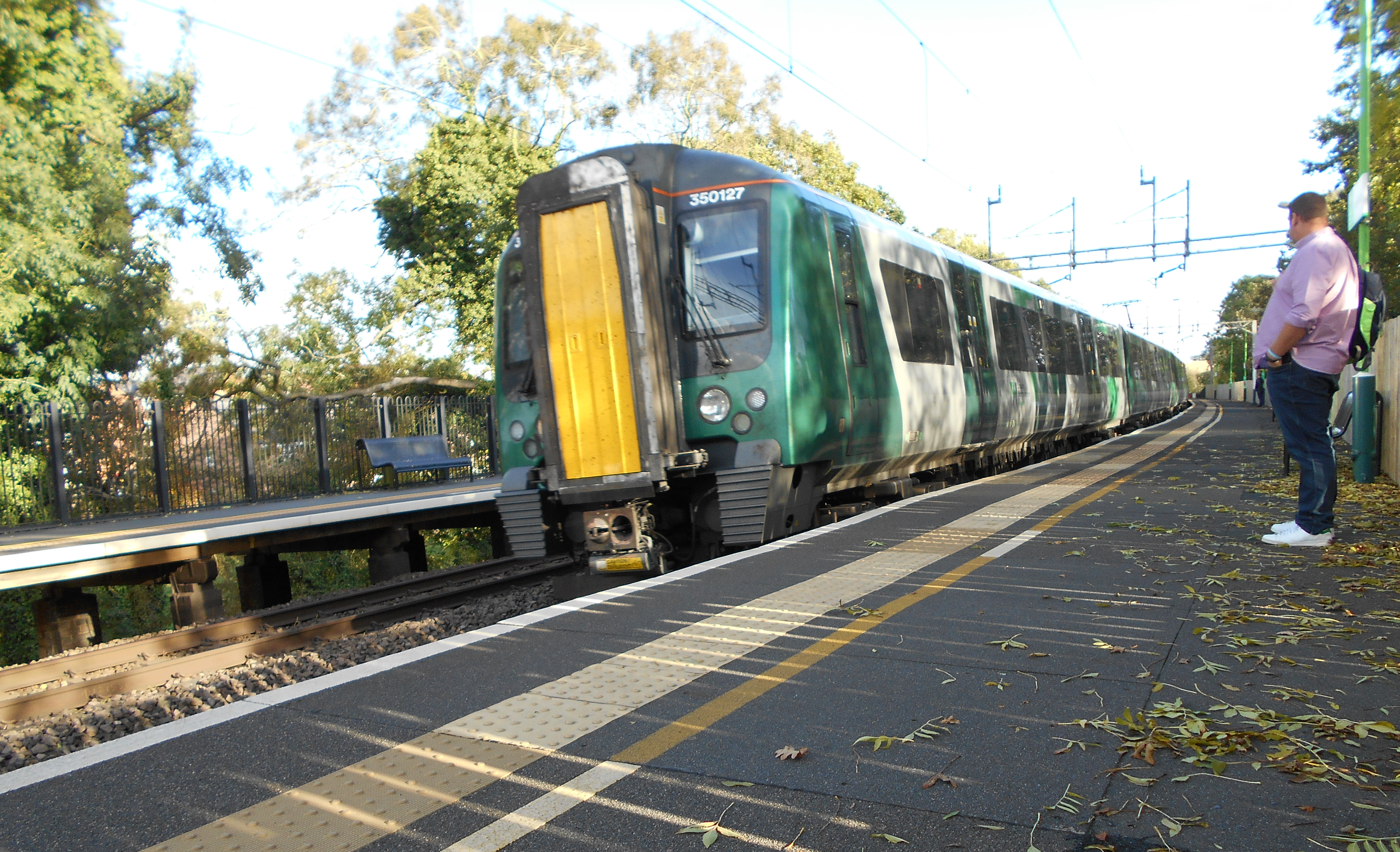
London Northwestern Railway Class 350 pulling into Long Buckby
