= Creak =

Creak(s) or creaking may refer to:

- Vocal fry register, a type of human voice register
- Neck creaking
- Mount Creak, a peak in Antarctica
- Creaks, 2020 video game
- Creaked Records, a Swiss independent record label
- Creaking, an ent-like creature in the video game Minecraft

== People with the surname ==
- Edith Creak (1855–1919), English founder of girls' schools
- Mildred Creak (1898–1993), English child psychiatrist

== See also ==
- Crackle (disambiguation)
- Creek (disambiguation)
