= Krick =

Krick is a surname. Notable people with the surname include:

- Frank Krick (1910–1982), American sprint canoer
- Irving P. Krick (1906–1996), American meteorologist and inventor
- Jaynie Krick (1929–2014), American baseball pitcher and utility infielder
- Jon Krick (born 1974), American football player
- Kathryn Krick (born 1991), American Pentecostal pastor and social media personality
- Perna Krick (1909–1991), American sculptor, painter and teacher
- Peter Krick (born 1944), German figure skater
- Tobias Krick (born 1998), German volleyball player

== See also ==
- Crick (disambiguation)
