= Creek =

A creek in North America and elsewhere, such as Australia, is a stream that is usually smaller than a river. In the British Isles, it is a small tidal inlet.

Creek may also refer to:

- Creek Indians, also known as the Muscogee people
- Creek language or Muscogee language
- Creek (surname)
- Creek County, Oklahoma, United States
- Creek Audio, a British hi-fi company
- TH-67 Creek, a U.S. Army variant of the Bell 206 helicopter
- Creek (fandom), a ship between Tweek Tweak and Craig Tucker
- Creek (Dubai Metro), a metro station in Dubai, UAE
- "Creek", a 2024 song by Alli Walker
- Creek, original name of English rock band Pale Waves

== See also ==
- Hell Creek, a geological formation in North America
- Creak (disambiguation)
- Crick (disambiguation)
- Kreek, a surname
