= Pulpit Bridge =

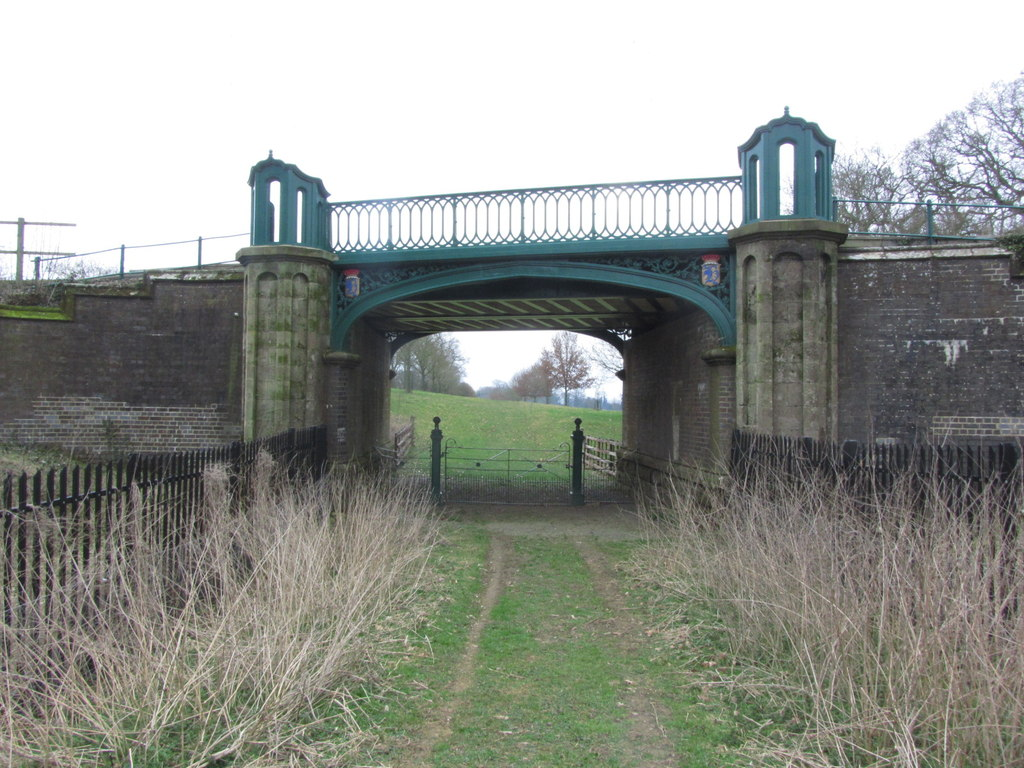
- Coordinates: 52°19′26″N 1°06′56″W
- Carries: Northampton loop
- Crosses: Entrance drive to Watford Lodge
- Locale: Watford, Northamptonshire, England
- Maintained by: Network Rail
- Heritage status: Grade II listed building

Characteristics
- No. of spans: 1

History
- Opened: 1877

Location
- Interactive map of Pulpit Bridge

The Pulpit Bridge (officially Bridge No. 69, also the Armchair Bridge or Lord Henley's Bridge) is a railway bridge near Watford in Northamptonshire. It carries the Northampton loop line over a former entrance drive to the Watford Park estate. Built in 1877, it is now a Grade II listed building for its unusual design.

== Design ==
The bridge is in metal with stone abutments and brick wing walls. Its parapet has a shape which has been variously described as resembling an armchair or a pulpit. It is a single span and sits on a stone plinth. It has a pair of four-centred arches which face north and south have foliate designs. The spandrels contain the coat of arms of the Henley barons, the owners of Watford Park. The parapets take the form of balustrades with interleaving arches. They end with projections which cap the abutments and which resemble a church pulpit or the arms of a chair. The projections have decorative banding, finials and openwork in the shape of gothic arches. The total span of the bridge is about 25 feet (7.6 metres).

The abutments are in moulded ashlar with stone copings. They have carved recessed panels in a similar shape to the openwork on the metal projections which are directly above. Underneath the bridge is a metal gate which rests on decorative posts and is flanked by railings on either side. The gate marks the entry point to the point.

== History ==
The bridge was built in 1877 by the London and North Western Railway for its Northampton loop line which was built to provide a second pair of tracks between Roade and Rugby and to serve Northampton, which the original line bypassed in the 1830s. Watford Park belonged to Anthony Henley, 3rd Baron Henley, who apparently contributed the design for the bridge. The bridge was used as a halt from which Henley—the MP for Northampton—could travel to parliament in London. Henley was a lay vicar and is believed to have used the bridge to preach to the estate's workers, hence its nickname "Pulpit Bridge". The nickname "Armchair Bridge" was apparently coined by railway staff for its resemblance to a piece of furniture.

The bridge originally had other decorative cast-iron elements but these were removed in the 1930s, having deteriorated beyond repair. The bridge is otherwise little altered and is regularly maintained as an active railway bridge. It was designated a Grade II listed building in 2011 in recognition of its unusual design. Listed building status provides legal protection from unauthorised demolition or unsympathetic modification.
