= Rugby Parkway railway station =

Proposed railway station in Warwickshire, England

Coordinates: 52.355249°N 1.192641°W

Rugby Parkway

General information
- Location: Houlton, Borough of Rugby; England
- Platforms: 2
Location

Rugby Parkway is a proposed railway station in Houlton on the eastern outskirts of Rugby, promoted by Warwickshire County Council. It was the subject of a high level feasibility study which recommended the station to be located on the Northampton Loop Line, near the Hillmorton area of Rugby, and close to new housing in Houlton and DIRFT.

It will be near to the location of the former Kilsby and Crick station, which closed in 1960.

In 2017, the Coventry & Warwickshire Local Enterprise Partnership (CWLEP) allocated £4 million to the project to develop this station as part of the Growth Deal.

However, in June 2018 the plans were put on hold after £4 million of funding from CWLEP was withdrawn when Warwickshire County Council could not meet the deadline to secure an additional £5 million from the government.

In July 2019 Warwickshire County Council's Rail Strategy for 2019-2034 proposed that the station would be opened between 2019 and 2026, with the possibility that at some point additional platforms could be provided on the 'fast' West Coast Main Line lines, in addition to the slow lines via Northampton.

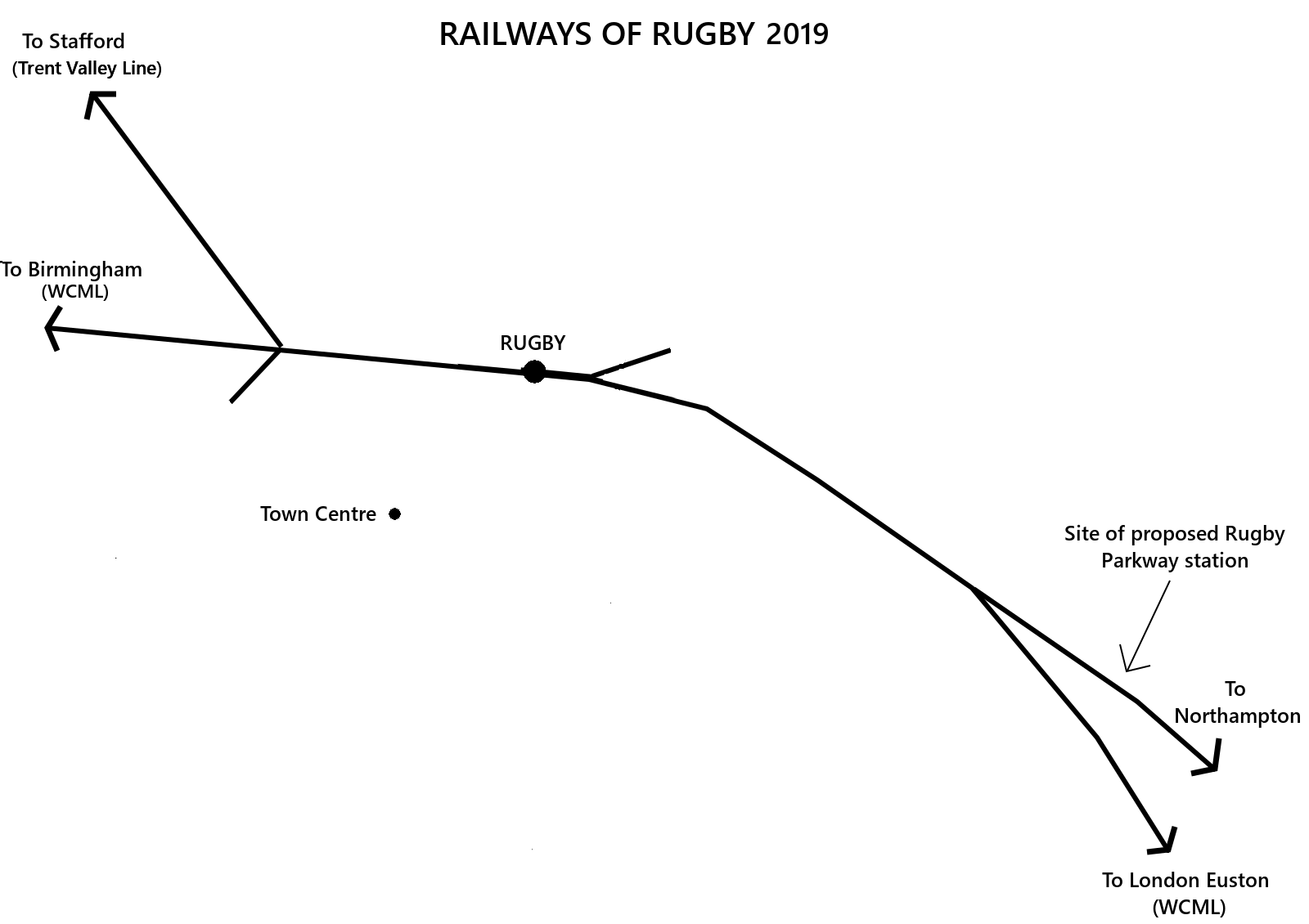
Diagram of the proposed location of Rugby Parkway station in relation to the other railways around Rugby.

In January 2023, Warwickshire County Council launched a public engagement on its outline plans for the station.

== Services ==
As of 2018, the services are yet to be defined, but could be two or possibly three per hour.

== See also ==
- Rugby railway station - the town's existing railway station.
