= Church Brampton railway station =

Former railway station in Northamptonshire, England

Coordinates: 52.281°N 0.9559°W

Church Brampton
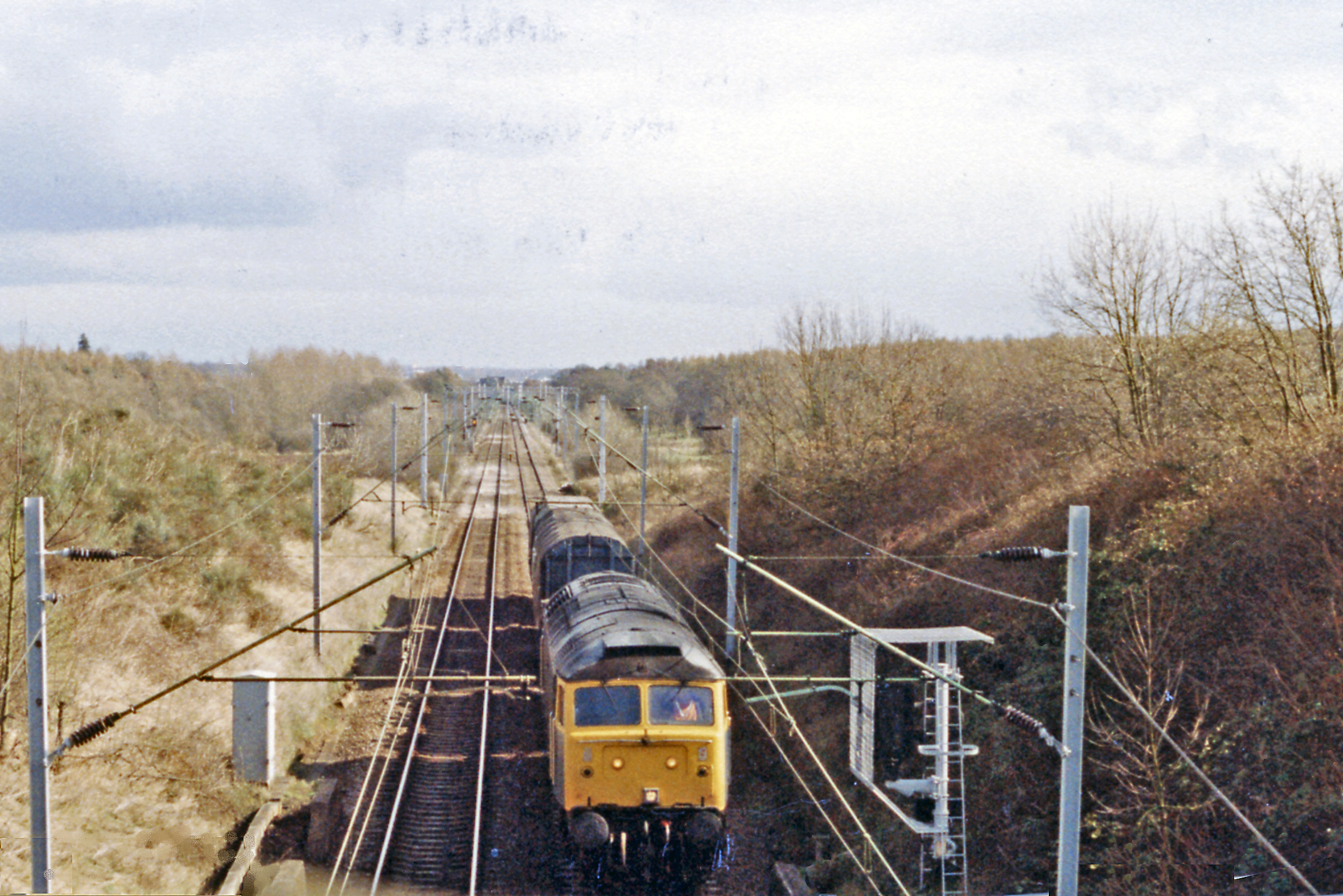
- Site of Church Brampton station in 1989.

General information
- Location: Church Brampton, West Northamptonshire; England
- Platforms: 2

Other information
- Status: Disused

History
- Original company: London and North Western Railway
- Pre-grouping: London and North Western Railway
- Post-grouping: London Midland and Scottish Railway

Key dates
- 13 May 1912: Station opens
- 1 Jan 1917: Station closed
- 5 May 1919: Station opens
- 18 May 1931: Station closed
Location

Church Brampton was a railway station on the Northampton Loop Line serving the village of Church Brampton in Northamptonshire.

The station was opened on 13 May 1912, to serve the villages of Church Brampton and Harlestone, but primarily the newly opened Northampton Golf Club. It was opened by the London & North Western Railway, which became the London, Midland and Scottish Railway in 1923. The station had a short life and was closed on 18 May 1931; the reason for the closure was stated to be that most golfers by then arrived by car. All traces of the station were removed when the line was electrified in the 1960s.

Preceding station	Historical railways	Following station
Althorp Park; Line open, station closed	London and North Western Railway; Northampton Loop	Northampton; Line and station open

== See also ==
- Pitsford and Brampton railway station - A nearby station on the Northampton to Market Harborough line.
