= Althorp Park railway station =

Former railway station in Northamptonshire, England

Althorp Park
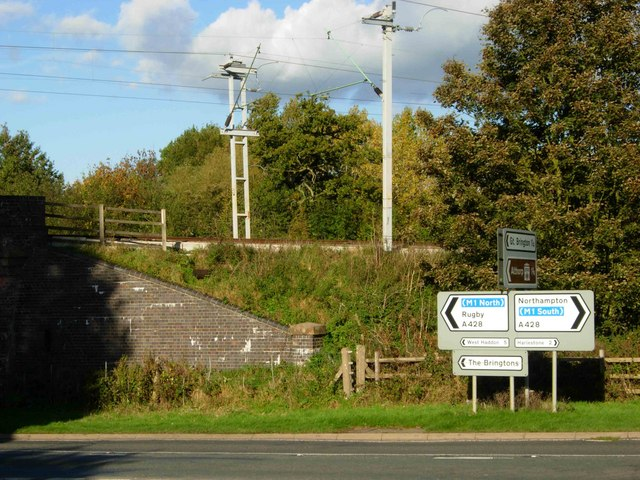
- The site of the former station, 2006

General information
- Location: Althorp, West Northamptonshire, England
- Coordinates: 52.290278°N 1.002547°W
- Platforms: 2

Other information
- Status: Disused

History
- Original company: London and North Western Railway
- Pre-grouping: London and North Western Railway
- Post-grouping: London Midland and Scottish Railway

Key dates
- 1 December 1881: Station opens
- 13 June 1960: Station closed
Location

Althorp Park railway station served the civil parish of Althorp, in Northamptonshire, England, between 1881 and 1960. It was situated on the Northampton Loop Line; it was adjacent to Althorp House, the ancestral seat of the Spencers, the family of Diana, Princess of Wales.

== History ==
Opened by the London and North Western Railway, it joined the London Midland and Scottish Railway during the Grouping of 1923. The line then passed on to the London Midland Region of British Railways on nationalisation in 1948.

The station was closed by the British Transport Commission in 1960.

| Preceding station | Historical railways | Following station |
|---|---|---|
| Long Buckby; Line and station open | London and North Western Railway; Northampton Loop | Church Brampton; Line open, station closed |

== The site today ==
Trains still pass through the site at speed on the Northampton Loop Line, although there are no traces remaining of the former station.
