= Crackle =

Crackle or crackling may refer to:

== Foods ==
- Cracklings, the tissue remaining after lard and tallow have been extracted from animal fats
  - Pork rinds in American English, pork scratchings in British English when served in small pieces as a snack or side-dish, or pork crackling in the UK when the rind is left on a roasted pork joint
  - Crackling bread, an American dish incorporating cracklings
  - Gribenes, goose or chicken cracklings in Ashkenazi Jewish cuisine
- Krackel, an American candy bar

== Sounds ==
- Crackles, an abnormal lung sound heard in a person with respiratory disease
- Crackling, a form of audible noise often associated with impulse noise
- Crackling noise, a broad type of noise

== Other uses ==
- Crackle (album), album by Bauhaus
- Crackle (Kellogg's), a cartoon figure
- Crackle (physics), fifth derivative of displacement
- Cracklin', a 1963 album by Roy Haynes with Booker Ervin
- Crackle glaze, in pottery, a surface covered by small cracks, usually deliberate
- Craquelure or crackle, a finish on paintings, usually developed over time
- Crackle (service), online distributor of streaming films and television shows

== See also ==
- Cackle (disambiguation)
- Creak (disambiguation)
