= Hunsbury Hill Tunnel =

Railway tunnel in Northamptonshire, England

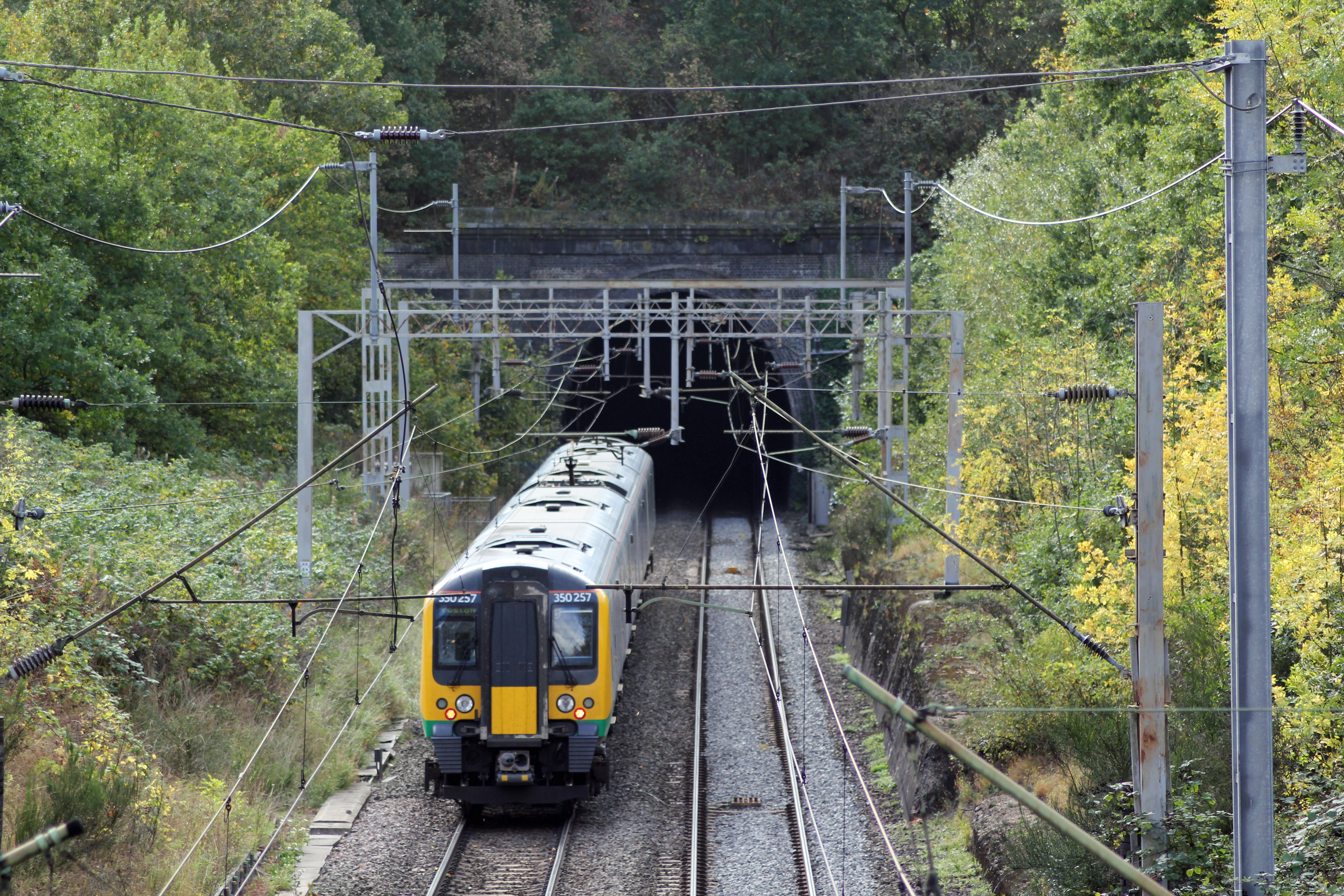
Southbound train entering north portal of Hunsbury Hill Tunnel

Hunsbury Hill Tunnel is a railway tunnel on the Northampton Loop Line of the West Coast Main Line. The tunnel runs in a straight line from the Briar Hill district of Northampton (north portal: 52°13′20″N 0°54′56″W), England about north by east to the East Hunsbury district south of the town (south portal: 52°12′47″N 0°55′10″W). The tunnel has a single bore with twin tracks and is 1,152 yards (1,053 m) long. It is about 1 mile south of Northampton railway station and the next station south is Wolverton in Milton Keynes. The tunnel opened together with the rest of the loop line in 1881.
