= Kreek =

Family name

Kreek is an Estonian surname (meaning "damson") and Dutch surname (meaning "creek" or "stream"), with notable bearers including:

- Adam Kreek (born 1980), Canadian rower
- Aleksander Kreek (1914–1977), Estonian shot putter and discus thrower
- Ardo Kreek (born 1986), Estonian volleyball player
- Cyrillus Kreek (1889–1962), Estonian composer
- Mary Jeanne Kreek (1937–2021), American neurobiologist
- Michel Kreek (born 1971), Dutch footballer

== See also ==
- Creek (disambiguation)
