= Kilsby and Crick railway station =

Former railway station in Northamptonshire, England

Coordinates: 52.3487°N 1.1730°W

Kilsby and Crick
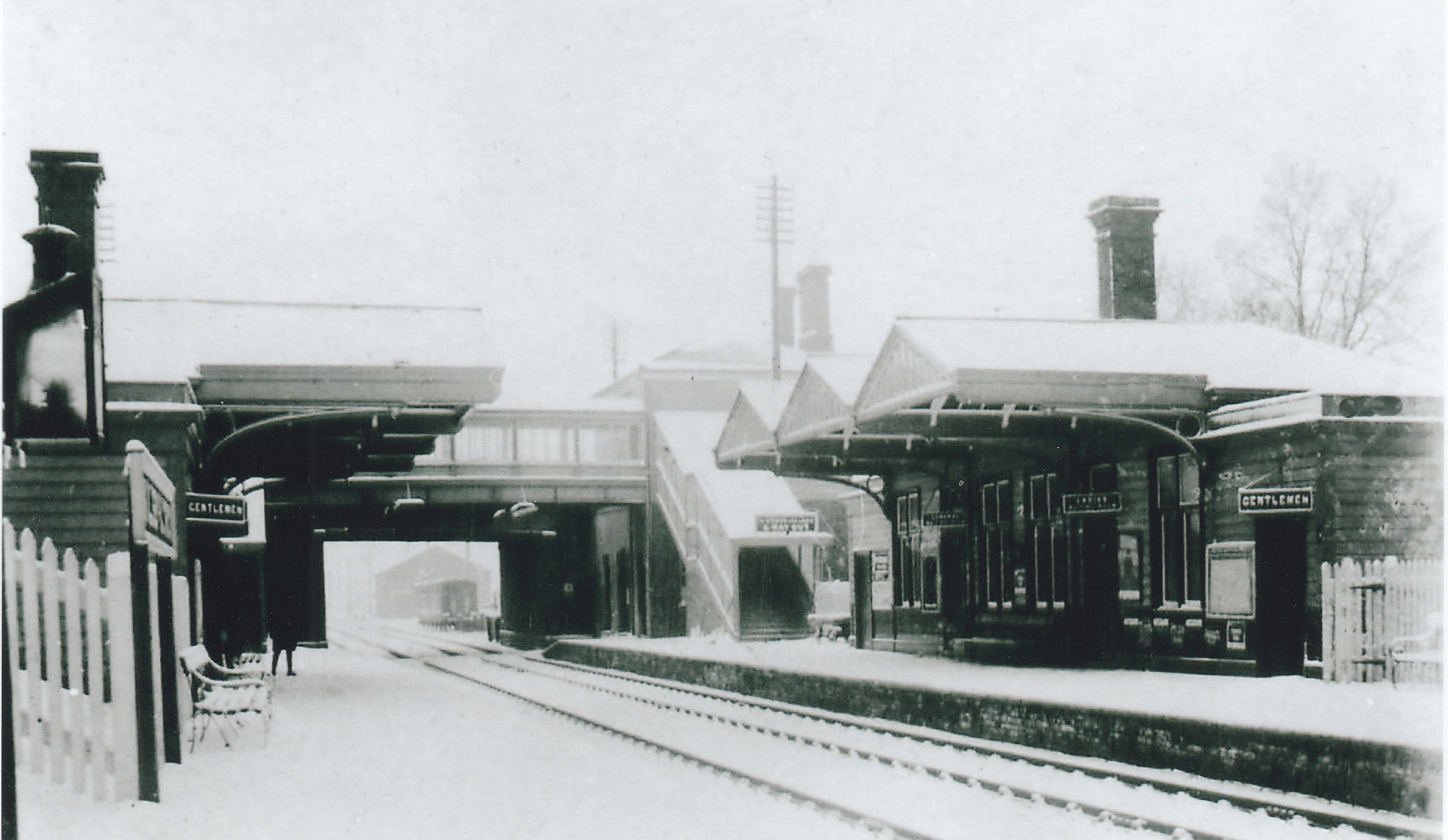
- Old photograph of the station, looking north-west towards Rugby

General information
- Location: Kilsby and Crick; England
- Platforms: 2

Other information
- Status: Disused

History
- Original company: London and North Western Railway
- Pre-grouping: London and North Western Railway
- Post-grouping: London, Midland and Scottish Railway

Key dates
- 1 December 1881: Station opens
- 1 February 1960: Station closed
Location

Kilsby and Crick was a railway station on the Northampton Loop Line serving the villages of Kilsby and Crick in Northamptonshire. It was located to the eastern side of where the railway crossed the A5 road at the site now occupied by the Daventry International Rail Freight Terminal. It was located about 1 mile (1.6 km) from Kilsby and 1 1/2 miles (2.4 km) from Crick.

The station was opened along with the line in 1881, by the London and North Western Railway which became part of the London, Midland and Scottish Railway during the Grouping of 1923. The line then passed on to the London Midland Region of British Railways on nationalisation in 1948.

The station closed to passengers on 1 February 1960 and to goods on 6 July 1964. Most of the station was demolished, but part of the goods platform to the west of the A5 still survives.

| Preceding station | Historical railways | Following station |
|---|---|---|
| Rugby; Line and station open | London and North Western Railway; Northampton Loop | Long Buckby; Line and station open |

== See also ==
- Rugby Parkway railway station - a proposed new station a short distance away.
