= Perna Krick =

American sculptor, painter and teacher (1909–1991)

Perna Krick (1909, Greenville, Ohio – 9 March 1991, Baltimore, Maryland) was an American sculptor, painter and teacher.

The daughter of Harry E. and Perna Krick, she was born and raised in Greenville, Ohio, and attended the school of the Dayton Art Institute. She came to Baltimore in 1927 to attend the Rinehart School of Sculpture at the Maryland Institute College of Art (MICA), where she studied under J. Maxwell Miller and won two traveling scholarships to Europe. She later taught children's art classes at MICA, where Joan Erbe was one of her students.

Her best known work may be Young Siren (1937), a fountain figure of a young girl riding a fish. It was exhibited at the Pennsylvania Academy of the Fine Arts's 1938 annual exhibition, and at the National Sculpture Society's 1940 exhibition at the Whitney Museum of American Art. It is now installed in the children's room at the main branch of Baltimore's Enoch Pratt Free Library.

Her sculpture group, Serenity (1939), earned an honorable mention at the 1939 New York World's Fair. Under the New Deal's Section of Painting and Sculpture, she carved The Power of Communication (1939–40), a wood relief mural for the U.S. post office in Pocomoke, Maryland. It depicts a Native American spirit reclining on a cloud and observing a passing Air Mail plane.

Sculptor Reuben Kramer (1909–1999) had been a classmate at the Rinehart School. In 1944 they married, and together founded Pioneer House, "the first licensed, desegregated art school in Maryland." It is now known as the Baltimore Art Center for Children. In the 1940s she switched her artistic focus to painting, and became known for her depictions of animals, birds and flowers.

She exhibited at the Baltimore Museum of Art, the Pennsylvania Academy of the Fine Arts (1930, 1933–34, 1937–38), the Architectural League of New York, and elsewhere.

Her husband established the Perna Krick & Reuben Kramer Fellowship in her memory, an annual scholarship awarded to a student at the Rinehart School of Sculpture. He also donated their house/studio to MICA, which is used to house visiting artists.

== Selected works ==
- Baby Faun (1929, bronze), Art Institute of Chicago.
- Young Siren (1937, bronze), Children's Room, Enoch Pratt Free Library, Baltimore, Maryland.
- Serenity (1939). Exhibited at the 1939 New York World's Fair.
- The Power of Communication (1939, wood bas relief), U.S. post office, Pocomoke, Maryland.
- Bust of Marian Anderson (c. 1954, terra cotta), Jewish Museum of Maryland, Baltimore.
- Survivor of the Orkney Queen (1956, painting), Baltimore Museum of Art.
- Lowenstein Memorial Sundial (1974, bronze), Cylburn Arboretum, Baltimore, Maryland. A collaboration with her husband, Reuben Kramer.
- Reuben and Perna Kramer (no date, painting), Jewish Museum of Maryland, Baltimore. Self-portrait with her husband and cat.
