= Crick, Northamptonshire =

Village in Northamptonshire, England

Coordinates: 52.3484°N 1.1374°W

Crick
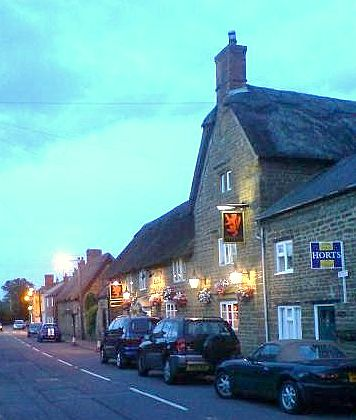
- Main Road, Crick (now bypassed) and the Red Lion Inn

- Location within Northamptonshire
- Population: 1,886 (2011 census)
- OS grid reference: SP587726
  - London: 78 mi (126 km)
- Civil parish: Crick
- Unitary authority: West Northamptonshire
- Ceremonial county: Northamptonshire
- Region: East Midlands
- Country: England
- Sovereign state: United Kingdom
- Post town: Northampton
- Postcode district: NN6
- Dialling code: 01788
- Police: Northamptonshire
- Fire: Northamptonshire
- Ambulance: East Midlands
- UK Parliament: Daventry

Crick is a village in the West Northamptonshire unitary authority area of Northamptonshire, England. It is close to the border with Warwickshire, 6 miles (10 km) east of Rugby and 14 miles (23 km) northwest of Northampton. The villages of Crick and West Haddon were by-passed by the A428 main road from Rugby to Northampton when the Daventry International Rail Freight Terminal (DIRFT) was built in 1996. The terminal is a short distance east of junction 18 of the M1 motorway, which is next to Crick. Crick's population in the 2001 census was 1,460, increasing to 1,886 at the 2011 census.

== History ==
Crick takes its name from the Brittonic Celtic word for "hill", "cruc". There are many similar examples across Wales, for example Crughywel, Crug Mawr and Crickadarn. Crack's Hill (grid reference SP595736) is about one mile (1.5 km) northeast of the village, next to the canal, and gives good views of Crick, Yelvertoft, West Haddon and Rugby from the top. Kilsby and Crick railway station was located 1 1/2 mi (2.5 km) west of the village between 1881 and 1960.

== Notable buildings ==
The Historic England website contains details of a total of 48 listed buildings in the parish of Crick, all of which are Grade II except for St Margaret's Church which is Grade I. Details of some of these are as follows:

=== St Margaret’s Church, Church Street ===
This building was erected in a perpendicular style in the 14th and 15th centuries, incorporating some 12th-century work. It includes a nave, two aisles, north sacristy, south porch and west tower. The walls are constructed of coursed ironstone and limestone rubble, with coursed ironstone and sandstone in the tower. The roofs are of tile and lead. There is a Romanesque sandstone font, whose base consists of three crouching figures. It was restored in 1840 by RC Hussey, and thus contains a number of elements from that era.

=== Ex-Servicemen's Club, Church Street ===
This property was built in a Gothic Revival style in 1847 as a school with an attached teacher's house. The walls are of red and blue brick with ironstone dressings. The octagonal bell turret has a small spire.

=== Vyntner's Manor, Watford Road ===
This house has a datestone which may read 1694. It is built of coursed squared ironwork, with a tile roof and brick and stone stacks. The bay window on the left-hand side has a datestone reading 1925, when extensions and internal remodelling took place.

== Facilities ==
Crick has a Post Office and a Co-Op. There are three public houses, the 'Royal Oak', the 'Wheatsheaf' and the 'Red Lion'. The Ex-Servicemen's Club is a members-only club. Currently the nearest railway station is at Rugby, 6 1/2 mi (10.5 km) away. However the proposed Rugby Parkway will be nearer, 2 3/4 mi (4.5 km) east.

== Canal ==
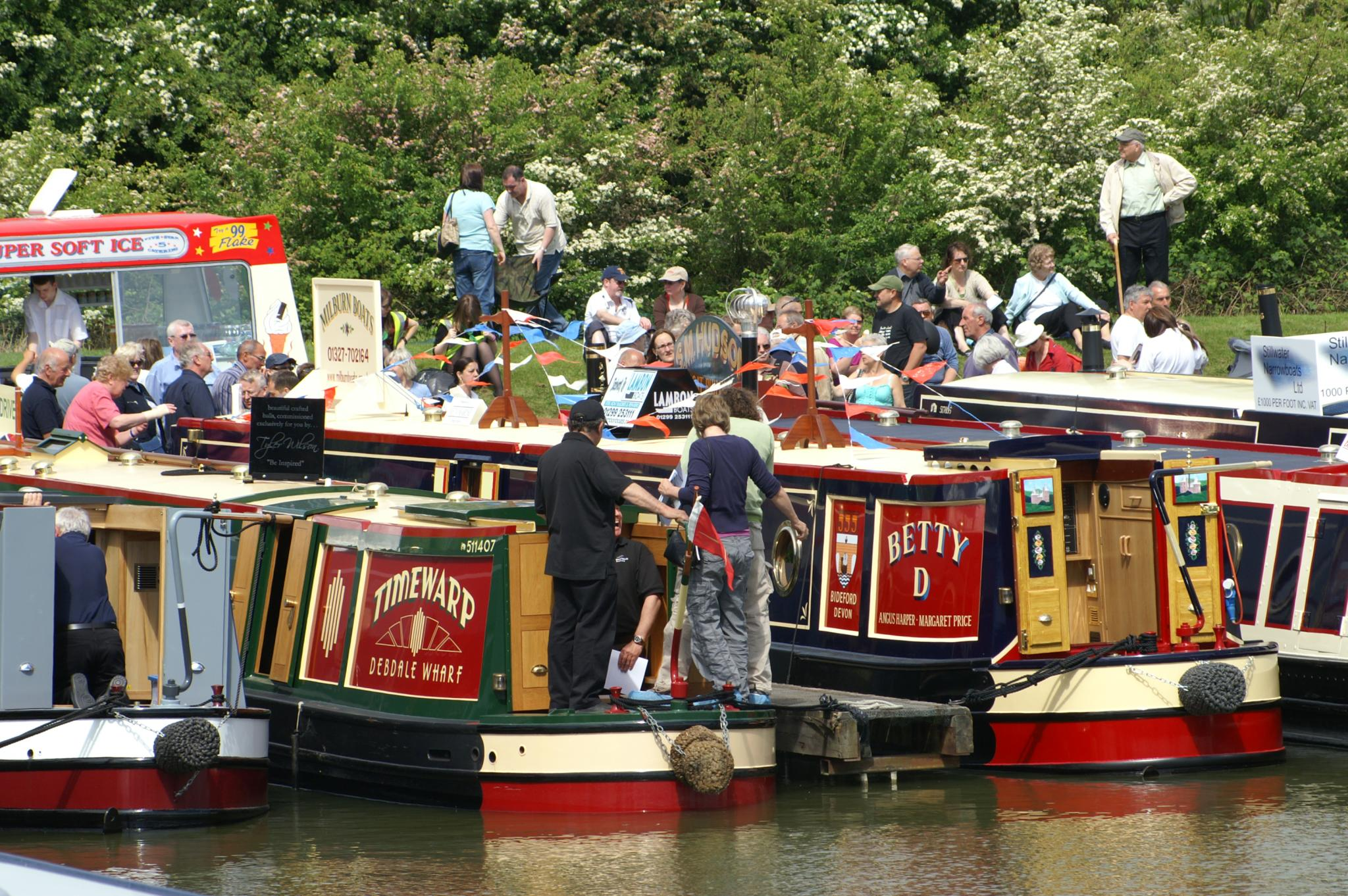
Crick Boat Show

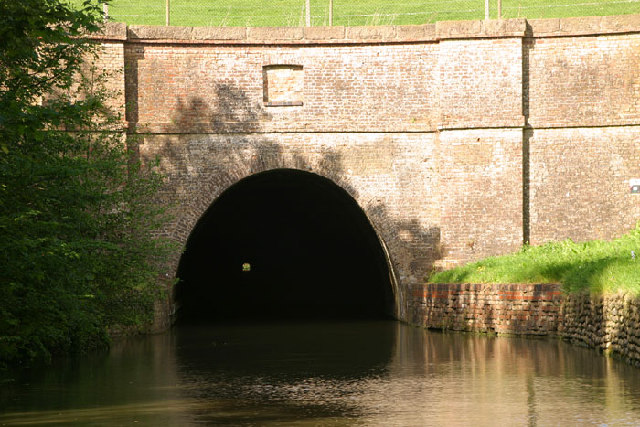
South entrance to Crick canal tunnel

The Leicester Line of the Grand Union Canal passes just east of Crick, and the village is well known for its canal marina and annual Crick Boat Show.

Crick canal tunnel is close to the south-east of the village and is 1,528 yards (1,397 metres) long.

== Schools ==
Crick Primary School is on Main Road and most clearly visible from Bury Dyke. Details of a series of reports on the school can be found in the relevant section of the Ofsted website. There were 143 pupils on the roll at the time of the inspection in October 2011.

Secondary school children living in the village generally attend Guilsborough School in Guilsborough, Lawrence Sheriff School for Boys, Rugby High School for Girls or Rugby School.
