= Cackle Street =

Cackle Street can refer to any of three hamlets in East Sussex, England:

- Cackle Street, Brede near Brede - 50.93N 00.58E TQ8218
- Cackle Street, Brightling near Brightling - 50.94N 00.40E TQ6919
- Cackle Street, Wealden near Nutley - 51.01N 00.06E TQ4526
