= Northampton loop =

Railway line in the Midlands, England

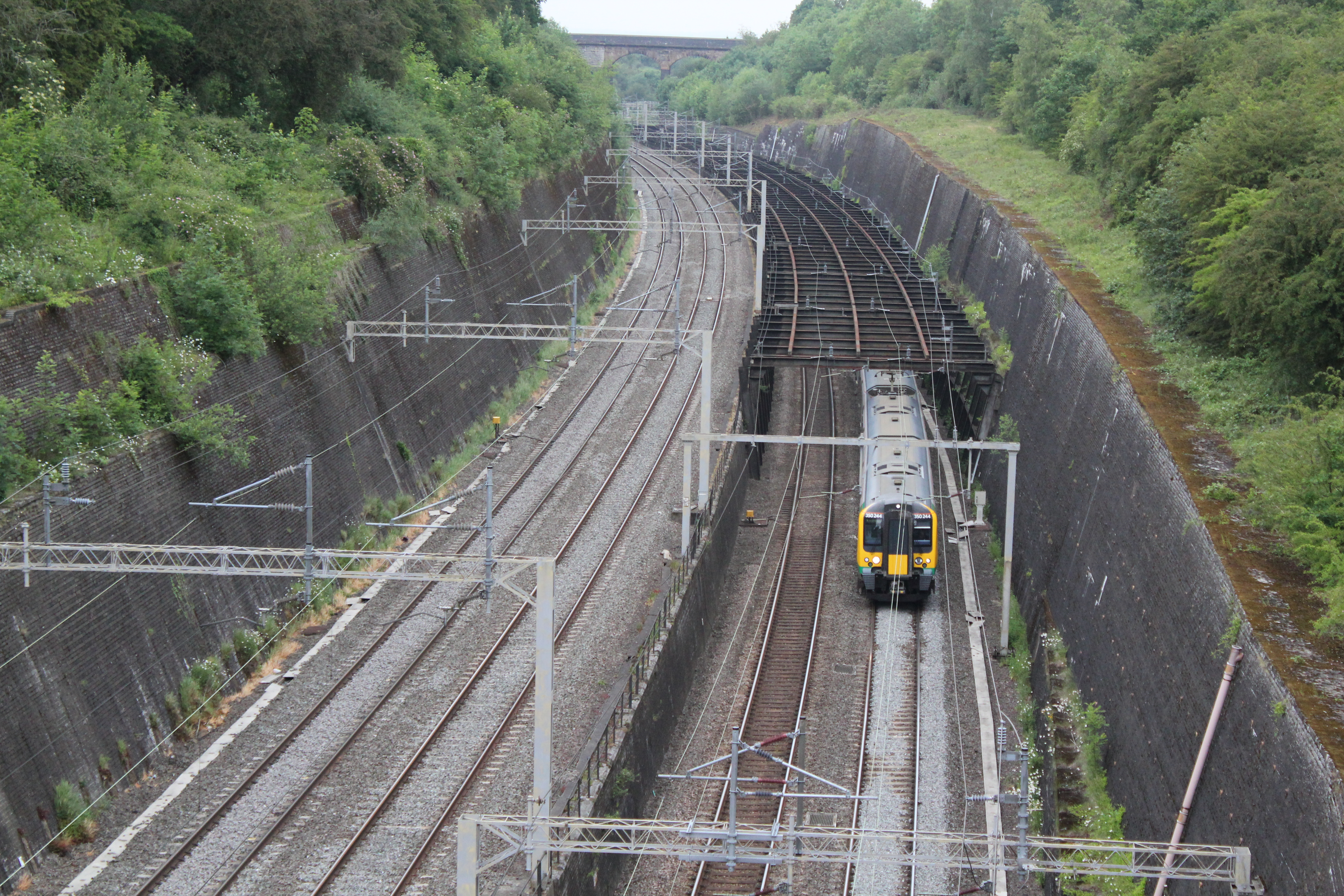
- Southbound train emerging into Roade Cutting, having climbed the incline on the loop line from Northampton to join the main line. The bridge in the distance is on Blisworth to Courteenhall Road.

Overview
- Status: Operational
- Owner: Network Rail
- Locale: Northamptonshire; East Midlands; West Midlands (region)
- Termini: Wolverton, Rugby
- Stations: Two

Service
- Type: Heavy rail
- System: National Rail
- Operator(s): London Northwestern Railway, Avanti West Coast
- Rolling stock: Class 350 Desiro; Class 390 Pendolino; Class 730 Aventra

History
- Opened: 1881

Technical
- Line length: Approx.23 3/4 miles (38.2 km)
- Number of tracks: Two
- Track gauge: 4 ft 8 1/2 in (1,435 mm) standard gauge
- Electrification: 25 kV 50 Hz AC OHLE
- Operating speed: 75 mph (120 km/h)
Route map
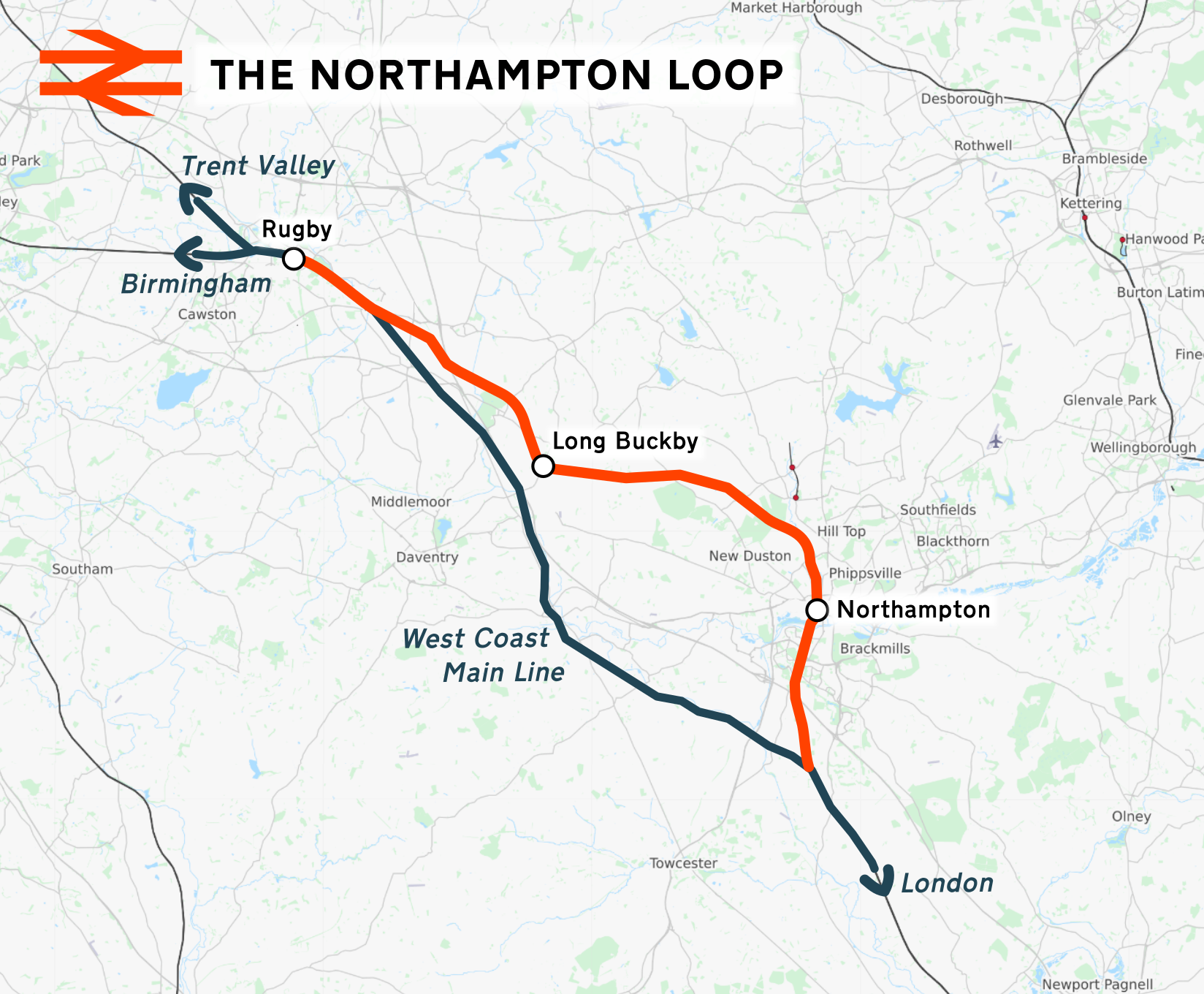
(Click to expand)

The Northampton loop is a railway line that links the town of Northampton to the West Coast Main Line (WCML), deviating from the faster direct main line which runs to the west. The WCML is a four-tracked line up to either end of the Loop; the 'up' and 'down' fast tracks take the direct route, while the 'up' and 'down' slow tracks are diverted via Northampton railway station. Generally, fast express trains run via the direct line, while freight and slower passenger services run via the loop line.

The southern interconnect between the Northampton loop and the direct London–Birmingham main line is at Hanslope Junction, just north of Milton Keynes. The lines continue to run alongside until the two routes diverge north of Roade at the northern end of Roade Cutting. The loop line then runs north-east for several miles until it reaches Northampton station. The line then heads north-west for around twenty miles, until it rejoins the main line at Hillmorton Junction at Rugby, just east of Rugby station.

== History ==
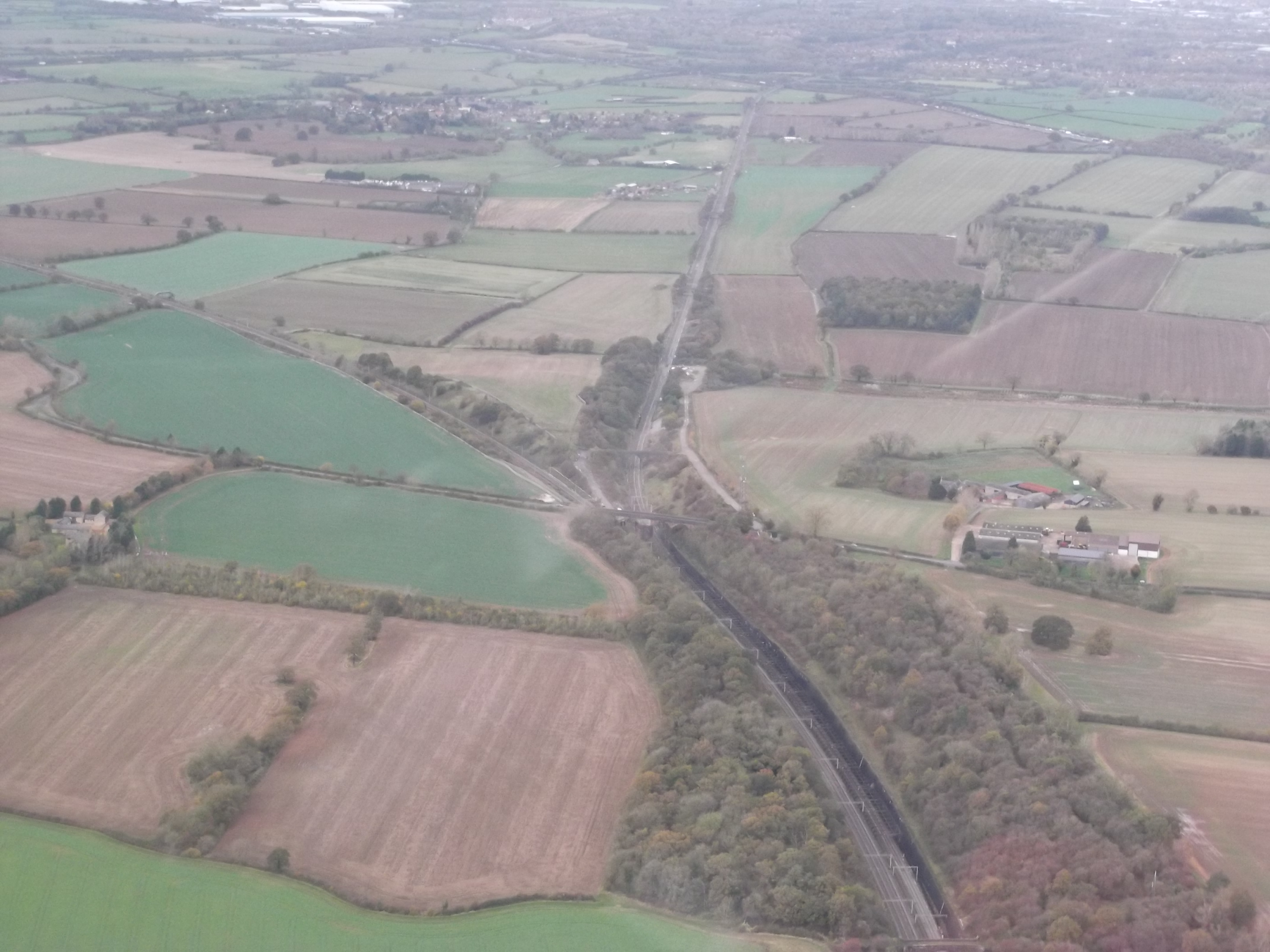
An aerial photo, looking north, shows where the Northampton loop (right) diverges from the main line (left) at Roade

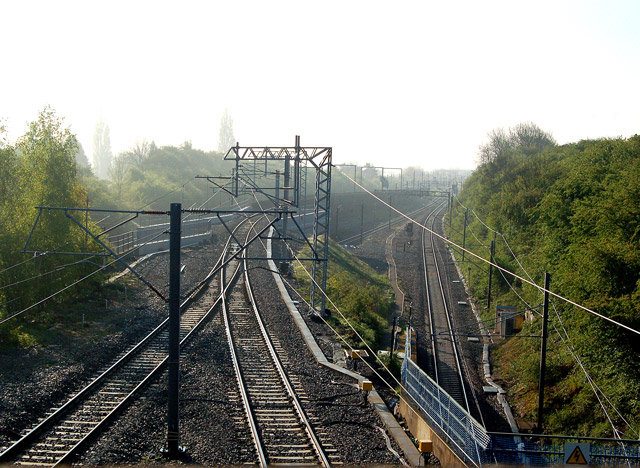
Hillmorton Junction at Rugby, the grade separated northern junction of the Northampton loop

When the London and Birmingham Railway (L&BR) was constructed in the 1830s, Northampton was by-passed, with the line running on high ground to the west via Kilsby Tunnel. Traditionally, this was said to have been because wealthy Northampton landowners objected to having a railway run through their land to reach the town.

However, an alternative view is that Northampton was by-passed because the gradients would have been too steep for the early locomotives of the 1830s to easily cope with. Robert Stephenson, the engineer of the London and Birmingham Railway, was determined to avoid gradients steeper than 1:330 (that is one foot of rising or falling gradient for every 330 feet of distance). As Northampton is located in the Nene Valley, 120 feet (37 metres) lower than Blisworth (the closest point the L&BR came), connecting the town would have required gradients significantly steeper than this.

This meant however that Northampton, despite being a large town, did not have direct rail links to London. A branch from the main line was built to Northampton in the early 1840s: the Northampton and Peterborough Railway, from Blisworth, which gave the town indirect rail links to London and Birmingham.

London and North-western Railway (Bletchley, Northampton, and Rugby) Act 1875
- Act of Parliament
- Parliament of the United Kingdom
- Long title: An Act for enabling the London and North-western Railway Company to construct new Railways from Bletchley to Northampton and Rugby; and for other purposes.
- Citation: 38 & 39 Vict. c. cii

Dates
- Royal assent: 29 June 1875

Text of statute as originally enacted

The successor to the L&BR, the London and North Western Railway (LNWR) decided to construct the loop line through Northampton in the 1870s. It was built as part of a wider scheme to double the capacity of the West Coast Main Line between Bletchley and Rugby, by quadrupling the track; however, routing the additional tracks on a deviation via Northampton had the advantage of giving the town a much better rail service, including a direct service to London, and avoiding the expense of widening Kilsby Tunnel. The LNWR obtained approval for the line in the London and North-western Railway (Bletchley, Northampton, and Rugby) Act 1875 (38 & 39 Vict. c. cii), and commenced construction in 1877. The line was opened for goods throughout on 1 August 1881, for passengers between Rugby and Northampton on 1 December 1881, and for passengers between Northampton and Roade on 3 April 1882. The loop line is a total of 23 3/4 miles (38.2 km) long, approximately 2 1/4 miles (3.6 km) longer than the direct line.

The Bletchley, Northampton, and Rugby Railway; (that is to say,)

Railway No. 1 (19 miles 4 furlongs 5 chains 50 links in length), commencing in the township of Fenny-Stratford in the parish of Bletchley in the county of Buckingham by a junction with the Company's main line of railway, and terminating in the parish of Dallington in the county of Northampton by a junction with the Company's Northampton and Market Harborough Railway:

Railway No. 2 (17 miles 1 furlong 1 chain 65 links in length), commencing in the parish of Kingsthorpe in the county of Northampton by a junction with the Company's Northampton and Market Harborough Railway, and terminating in the parish of Rugby in the county of Warwick by a junction with the Company's main line of railway:

Railway No. 3 (1 furlong 8 chains 80 links in length), to be situate wholly in the parish of Hardingstone in the county of Northampton, commencing by a junction with the Company's Northampton and Peterborough Railway, and terminating by a junction with the Company's Northampton and Market Harborough Railway.

— Section 4, London and North-western Railway (Bletchley, Northampton, and Rugby) Act 1875 (38 & 39 Vict. c. cii)

The loop line made use of the existing but small Northampton Castle station on the existing Northampton–Market Harborough line, which occupied part of the site of the historic Northampton Castle. The station needed to be expanded as part of the works; this required the almost complete demolition of what remained of the castle to make way for it.

Shortly after the completion of the loop line, the southern approach to Rugby station was remodelled, with a new flying junction built near Hillmorton, which allowed trains from the loop line to run into Rugby station without conflicting with trains on the fast lines.

The line was electrified along with the rest of the WCML during the 1960s in the wake of the BR 1955 Modernisation Plan.

The Daventry International Rail Freight Terminal (DIRFT), a major rail freight interchange, was opened in 1996 with a rail connection to the loop line and has been expanded several times since.

== Services and operations ==
The majority of passenger services on the line are provided by London Northwestern Railway, using Class 350 electric multiple units. The service consists of three 'semi-fast' trains per hour between London Euston and Birmingham New Street. There is also an hourly local service between Northampton and Birmingham. Prior to December 2012, there was also a service to and from Crewe, but a few serve the loop line during morning and evenings and hourly on Sundays.

Avanti West Coast provides a small number of Class 390 Pendolino services to London at the extremes of the day, but nearly all Avanti trains use the direct main line. Line speeds on the loop line are currently limited to 75 mph (120 km/h) compared to 125 mph (200 km/h) on the fast line, making the line unattractive to the routing of express services. As of 2011, line speeds were expected to increase to 90 mph (140 km/h) once signalling improvements are in place north of Northampton up to Rugby.

Long Buckby, the one other station on the line, is served by the London–Birmingham/Northampton–Birmingham services. The London–Crewe service does not stop at Long Buckby except on Sundays.

The line sees heavy freight traffic, as it is used by all freight trains on the southern part of the WCML. Many of these are container trains, with some serving the Daventry International Railfreight Terminal (DIRFT), which liis between Northampton and Rugby.

=== Stations ===
There were previously five stations on the line, three have now closed:

- Kilsby and Crick (closed 1960)
- Althorp Park (closed 1960)
- Church Brampton (closed 1931).

== Proposed future development ==
Warwickshire County Council has proposed a new station on the Northampton Loop Line, Rugby Parkway, which would be on the south-eastern outskirts of Rugby; it would serve the Hillmorton area of the town and the new housing development at Houlton, accommodating the future expansion of the town. The station was originally planned to open in 2019.

As funding was not secured, this deadline was not met. Nevertheless, in July 2019, Warwickshire County Council's Draft Rail Strategy for 2019-2034 proposed that the station would be opened between 2019 and 2026. There is the possibility that, at some point, additional platforms could be provided on the 'fast' WCML tracks, along with the slow lines via Northampton.

== Infrastructure ==
The Northampton loop starts at the northern end of Roade Cutting. The line is double tracked and electrified throughout. There are three tunnels on the Northampton loop, the longest of which is Hunsbury Hill Tunnel between Roade and Northampton, which is 1,152 yards (1,053 m) long. There are two shorter tunnels between Long Buckby and Rugby: Watford Lodge Tunnel at 115 yards (105 m), and Crick Tunnel at 595 yards (544 m). The line crosses the Pulpit Bridge (or "Armchair Bridge") between Rugby and Long Buckby.

== Accidents and incidents ==
- In January 1906, a young woman, 19 year old Lily Yolande Marie Rochaid, was found dead in Crick Tunnel, having fallen from the train she was travelling on from London to Rugby. A search was called after the train arrived at Rugby; it was noticed that the door of the carriage was open and no-one was inside. The circumstances of her death were never fully explained.
- Two very similar railway accidents occurred on the Northampton loop in 1967 and 1969. The first incident was near the village of Milton Malsor between Roade and Hunsbury Hill tunnel, whereas the other took place near the northern end of Roade cutting.
- On 20 March 1985, the body of 35 year old social worker Janet Maddocks was found beside the line to the north of Northampton station. Jack Roy, aged 15 at the time, was later convicted of murdering her and throwing her from a train.
