= Daventry International Rail Freight Terminal =

Rail-road intermodal freight terminal in England

Coordinates: 52°20′59″N 1°10′04″W

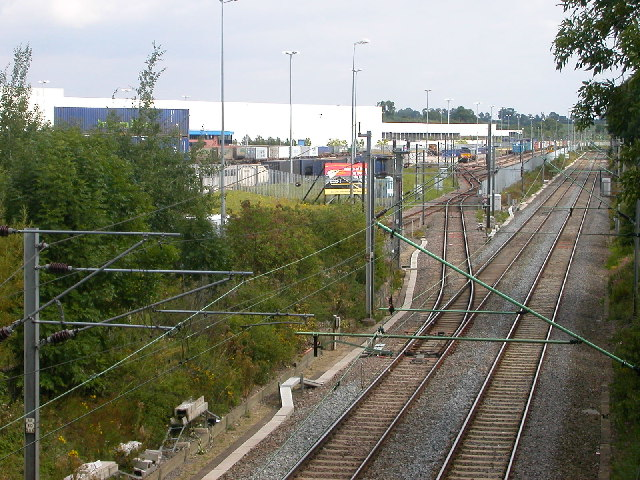
Rail link into DIRFT from the West Coast Main Line

Daventry International Rail Freight Terminal (DIRFT) is a rail-road intermodal freight terminal with an associated warehousing estate in Northamptonshire, England. The facility is located at the junctions between the M1 motorway, A5 and A428 roads, 4 miles (6 km) east of Rugby and 6 miles (10 km) north of Daventry; it has a rail connection from the Northampton loop of the West Coast Main Line.

The original development of approximately 300 acres (120 ha) was built during the 1990s. of which only DIRFT South (DIRFT Railport) had a direct rail connection. An extension, often referred to as DIRFT II, of about 130 acres (54 ha) received planning permission in 2005, and is designed to have all facilities rail connected. The first occupier of DIRFT II was Tesco, whose distribution centre reached completion in late 2011.

== History ==
=== DIRFT ===
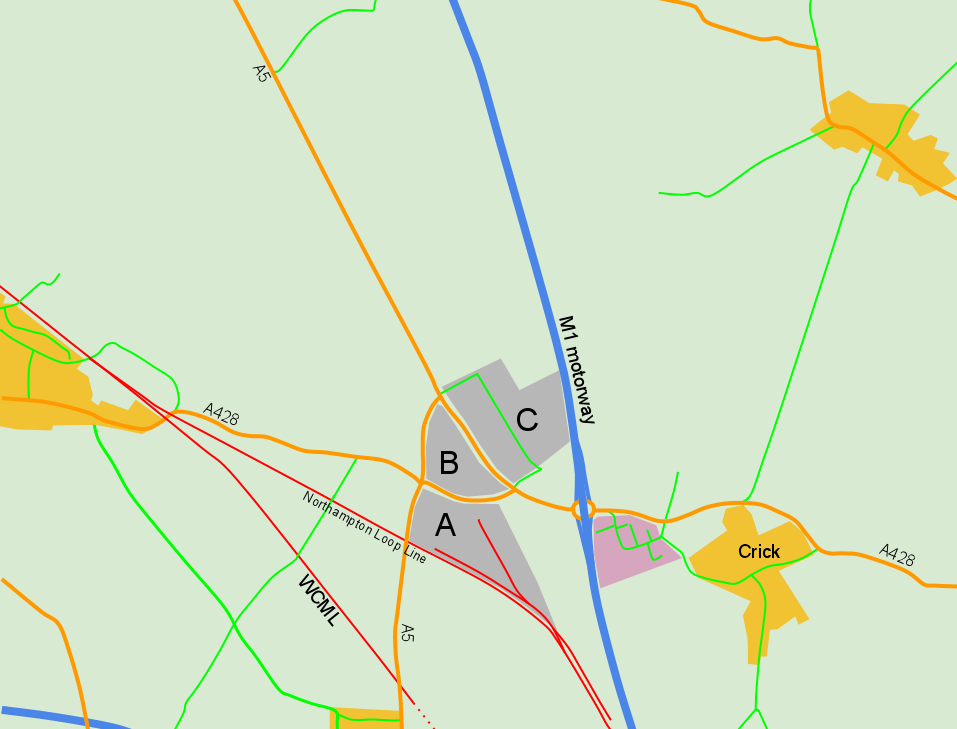
Original development: A – DIRFT south B – DIRFT Central C – DIRFT east Urban, A road, Minor road, Rail line (dotted in tunnel), Other industrial/commercial

Daventry International Rail Freight Terminal is part of a land development project undertaken by Severn Trent Water on a 430 acres (174 ha) site near Crick in Northamptonshire. The location, at junction 18 of the M1 motorway in close proximity to the A5, A14 and M6 roads had been identified as early as 1978 as a "motorway-orientated growth point". The ground area of the original DIRFT development is divided into three sections: DIRFT Central 40 acres (16 ha), DIRFT East 130 acres (53 ha), and DIRFT South 140 acres (55 ha) by the A5 and A428 roads.

The site first became operational on 27 May 1997, and was officially opened in November 1997 by Anne, Princess Royal, at inception the facility included a 475,000 square feet (44,100 m^{2}) warehouse operated for road haulage operator Eddie Stobart. The rail connected terminal was operated by Tibbett and Britten; construction of a 210,000 sq ft (20,000 m^{2}) rail connected warehouse was started in 1998, a second 265,000 sq ft (24,600 m^{2}) facility was constructed in 2000.

DIRFT was one of the earliest post-Channel Tunnel road-rail intermodal terminals – the site includes rail connected terminals and traditional warehousing was designed to act as a regional node for rail freight flows to and from the Port of Felixstowe and the Channel Tunnel, it forms part of the UK network of the Trans-European Combined Transport network.

The site was primarily developed by Severn Trent Property, part of Severn Trent Water. Early occupiers included Royal Mail, Tesco ('Fastway RDC' operated by DHL) (closed 2009), and Mothercare. In 2004, 74 acres (30 ha) of undeveloped land on the site with a capacity for 1,400,000 sq ft (130,000 m^{2}) of warehousing was sold to a British Land/ Rosemound joint venture, British Land subsequently let its holding to several customers including a 750,000 sq ft (70,000 m^{2}) warehouse let to Tesco in 2005.

Severn Trent plc sold its holding in DIRFT, as well as the 130 acres (53 ha) DIRFT II site to Prologis in 2006. In 2008 Malcolm Rail became the operator of the railport at DIRFT.

=== DIRFT II ===
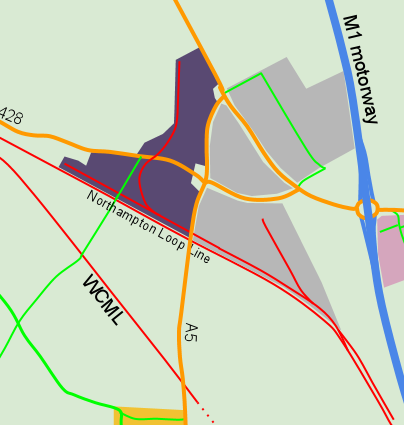
DIRFT2 extension

In 2005 planning permission was granted for a rail connected 130 acres (54 ha) westward expansion of the original site with a built ground area of over 1,900,000 sq ft (180,000 m^{2}). The DIRFT II expansion was designed for rail connected warehousing allowing transfer between sea or Channel Tunnel-borne rail-freight and road transport or warehouse storage. Plans included facilities for containerised and side-loaded palletised rail freight.

Tesco acquired a 840,000 sq ft (78,000 m^{2}) grocery distribution centre in 2011, constructed by VolkerFitzpatrick (main contractor), construction work was completed in September 2011. As part of the development, a rail tunnel was built under the A5 road to connect DIRFT II to the rail network via the original DIRFT railport.

=== DIRFT III ===
A further 7.5 million sq.ft. extension, DIRFT III, was proposed for construction on the former Rugby radio station site to the northwest of the current development. The proposal also included a large area 170 acres (70 ha) of green space, named Lilbourne Meadows. The development is a joint venture between ProLogis and Rugby Radio Station Limited Partnership (RRSLP) (BT and Aviva). The DIRFT III site would also be rail connected, with over 7,500,000 sq ft (700,000 m^{2}) of warehousing over 400 acres (163 ha) of land plus a 8.6 acres (3.5 ha) HGV parking site. A related development is the Sustainable Urban Extension (SUE) built to the west of DIRFT as a suburb of Rugby, with over 6,000 homes planned. The development took on the name of Houlton and the first homeowners moved in during December 2017.

A planning application to the Infrastructure Planning Commission (IPC) was submitted in 2011, and was approved in July 2014.

== See also ==
- Kilsby and Crick railway station – Former railway station on the site of the rail freight terminal
- Strategic rail freight interchange
