= 1931 in rail transport =

This article lists events related to rail transport that occurred in 1931.

== Events ==
=== January events ===
- January 1 – Ernest Lemon succeeds Sir Henry Fowler as Chief Mechanical Engineer of the London, Midland and Scottish Railway.
- January 11 – The Boston and Maine Railroad runs its first “Snow Train” for skiers and other winter vacationers.

=== March events ===
- March 17 – Sangu Express Railway Line, Osaka Uehonmachi to Ujiyamada of Ise route officially completed in Japan (as predecessor of Kintetsu Osaka Line and Kintetsu Yamada Line).

=== May events ===
- May 23 – The North Bay Railway (20 in (508 mm)) opens at Scarborough, North Yorkshire, England, with the world's first diesel-hydraulic locomotive, 4-6-2 1931 Neptune, Hudswell Clarke works no. D565.
- May 24 – The Baltimore and Ohio Railroad inaugurates the first air conditioned passenger train, the Columbian, between Jersey City, New Jersey, and Washington, DC.
- May 30 – Maine Central Railroad ends train service to the Bar Harbor ferry.

=== June events ===
- June – The County Donegal Railways Joint Committee in Ireland (3 ft (914 mm) gauge) introduces the first diesel engined railcar to enter regular passenger service in the British Isles.

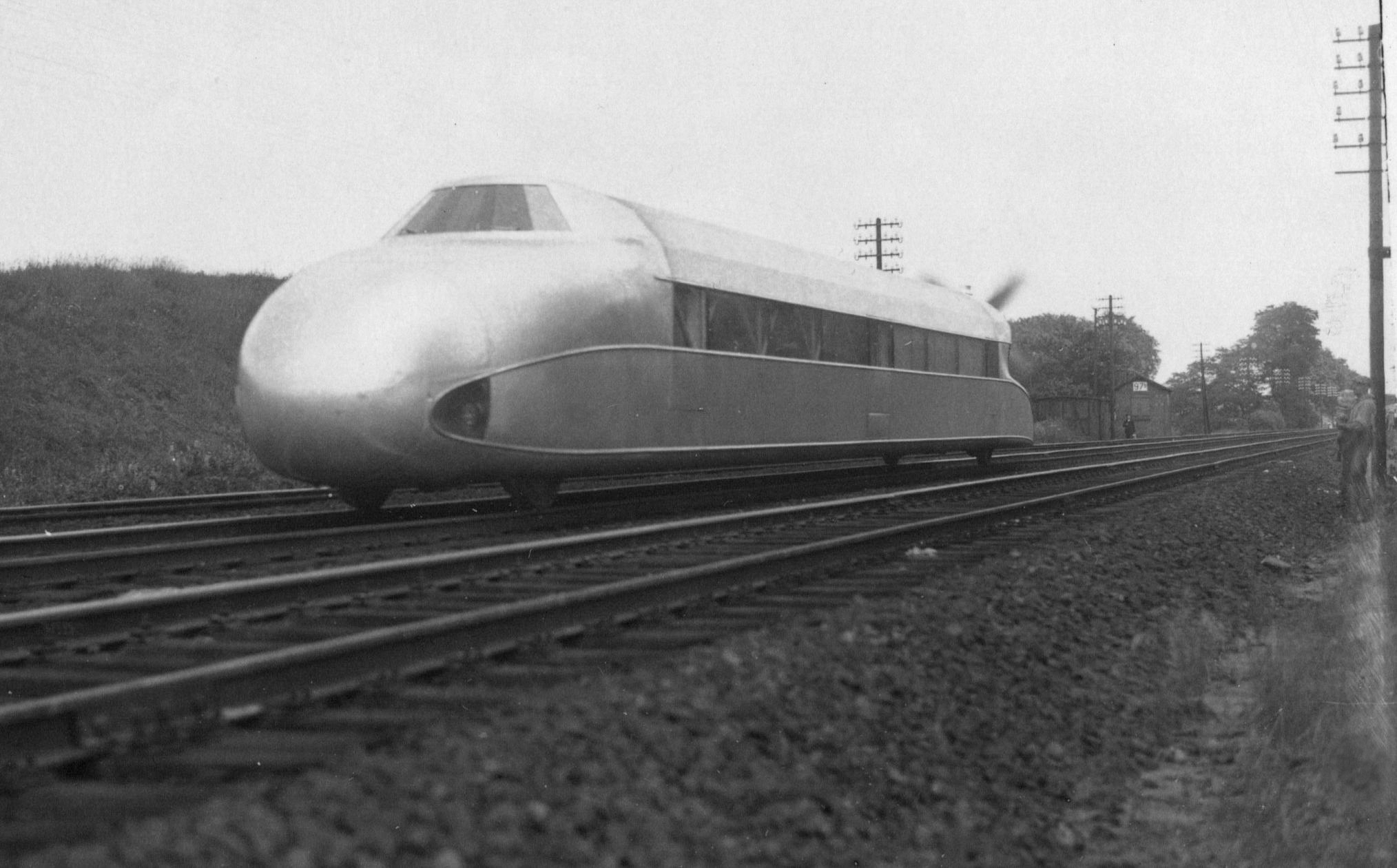
Schienenzeppelin

- June 10 – The German rail zeppelin (Schienenzeppelin), an experimental propeller driven railcar, sets up a new world railway speed record of 230 km/h on its way from Hamburg to Berlin which was not surpassed by any other train for 24 years.
- June 13 – Switzerland's Brienz Rothorn Bahn mountain railway reopens after a 17-year stoppage due to World War I.

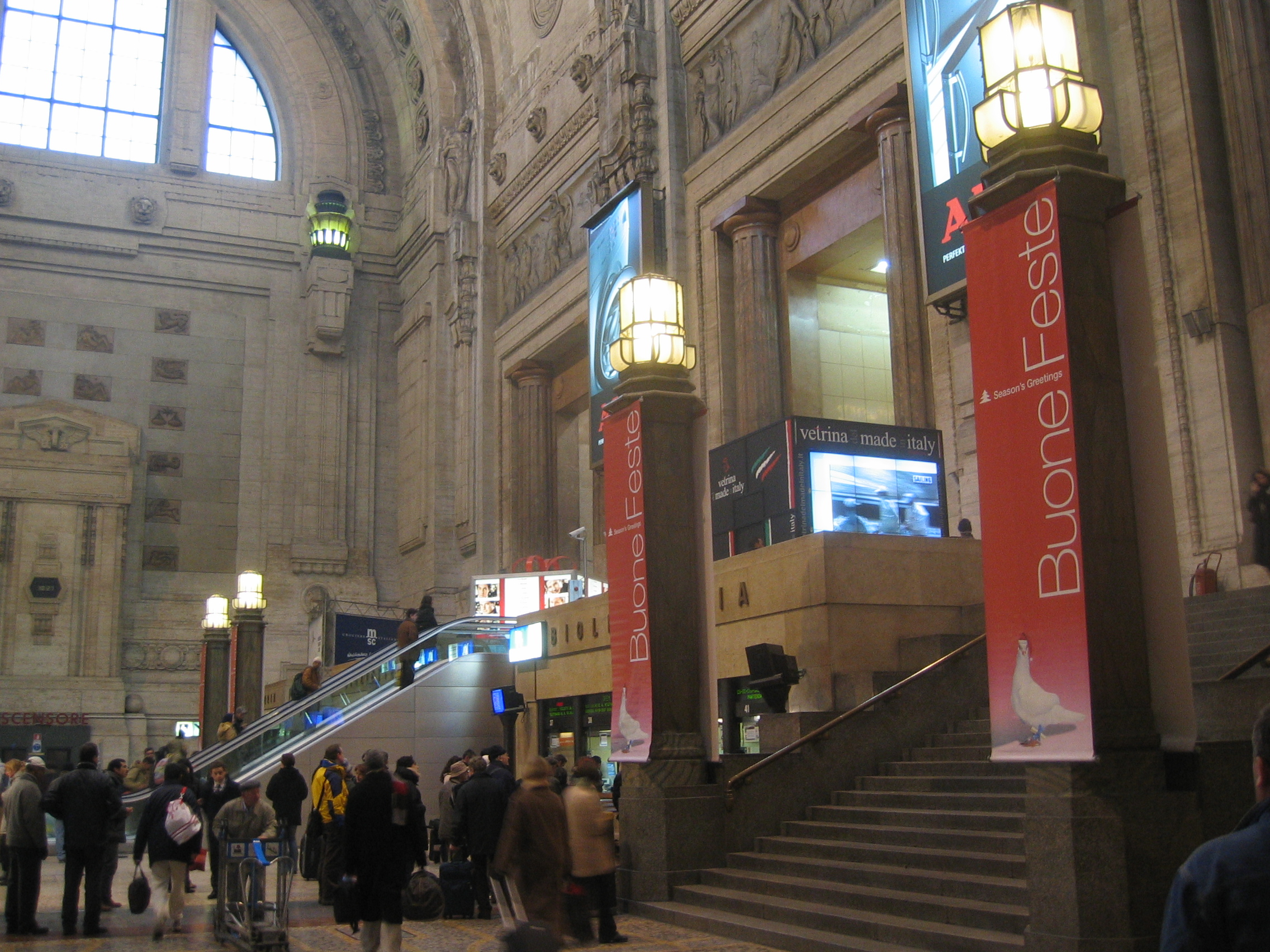
Milano Centrale

=== July events ===
- July 1 – Rebuilt Milano Centrale railway station opens in Italy.
- July 19 – Sudbury Town station on London Underground Piccadilly line opens as rebuilt by Charles Holden, the first of his iconic modern designs for the network.

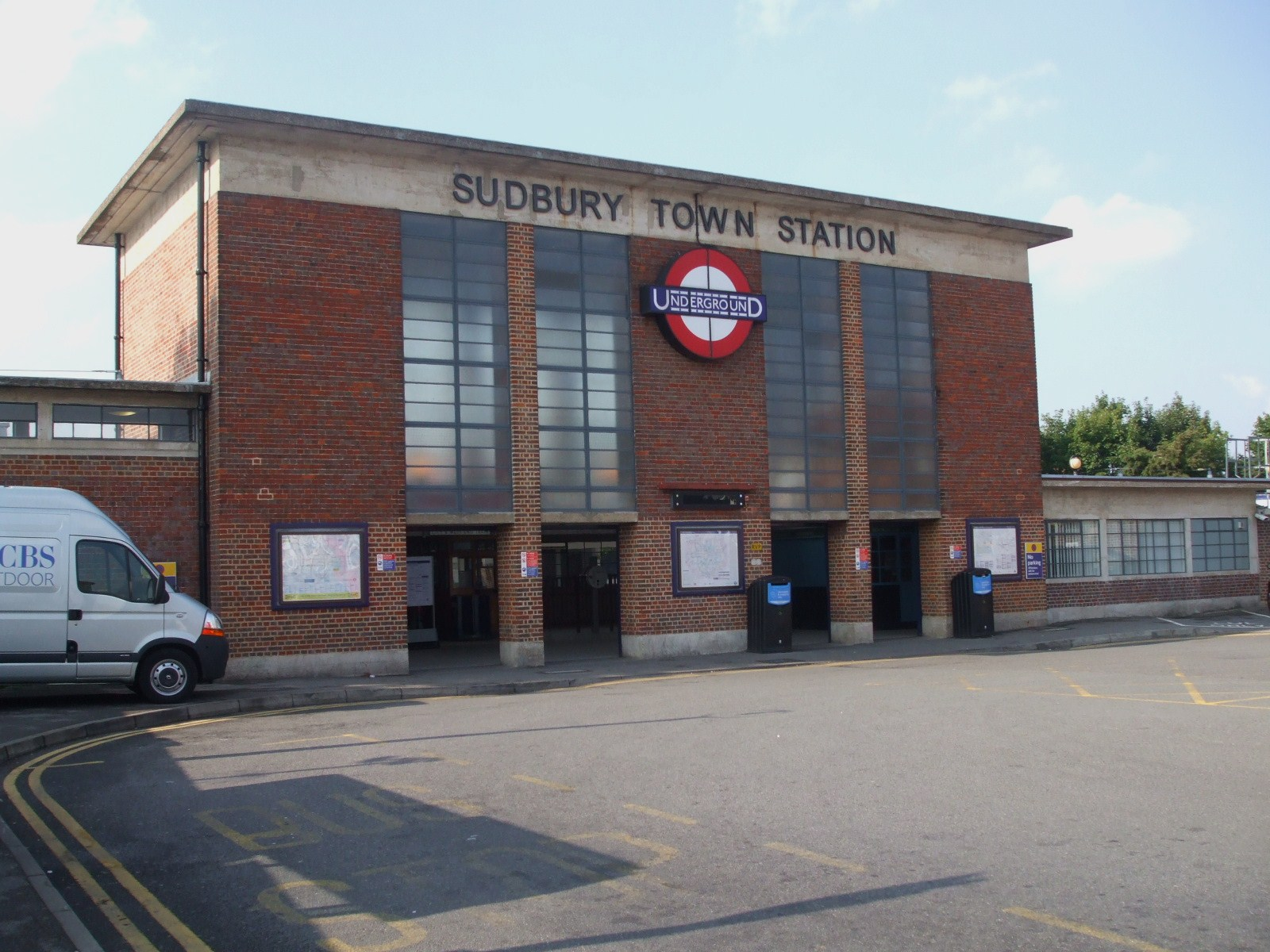
Sudbury Town

=== August events ===
- August 6 – Ferrovie del Sud Est established in Italy.

=== September events ===
- September 1 – Joetsu Line, Miyauchi of Nagaoka to Takasaki, including Shimizu Tunnel route officially completed, as same time, Ueno of Tokyo to Niigata direct express train service start in Japan.
- September 12 – Just outside Budapest, a bomb planted by a Hungarian Fascist destroys a section of the Biatorbágy Viaduct, plunging the Orient Express into the ravine below. Twenty people are killed. Entertainer Josephine Baker, one of the surviving passengers, gives an impromptu concert to calm other survivors.

=== October events ===
- October 17 – The Japanese Government Railways Hanawa Line in Iwate and Akita prefectures reaches Rikuchū-Ōsato Station.

=== November events ===
- November 12 – The Smithsonian Institution commemorates the 100th birthday of the John Bull by operating its mechanism with compressed air.

=== December events ===
- December 29 – Willingdon Bridge (modern-day Vivekananda Setu) is opened, carrying rail and road over the Hooghly River in West Bengal between Howrah and Calcutta.

=== Unknown date events ===
- Voroshilovgrad Locomotive Factory turns out first Class FD (Felix Dzerzhinsky) 2-10-2 steam locomotive which will become the USSR’s principal freight type, with 3213 being built up to 1942.
- A wide gauge railway line connecting Estonian towns Tartu and Pechory is opened; thereby Estonian seaports are directly connected to central areas of Russia and Ukraine.

== Births ==
=== Unknown date births ===
- Nelson W. Bowers, president of the National Railway Historical Society (1983–1987) (died 2004).

== Deaths ==
=== January deaths ===
- January 13 – Kálmán Kandó, Hungarian engineer who designed the world's first AC traction electric railway in Italy in 1902 (born 1869).
