= Baby transport =

Methods of transporting young children

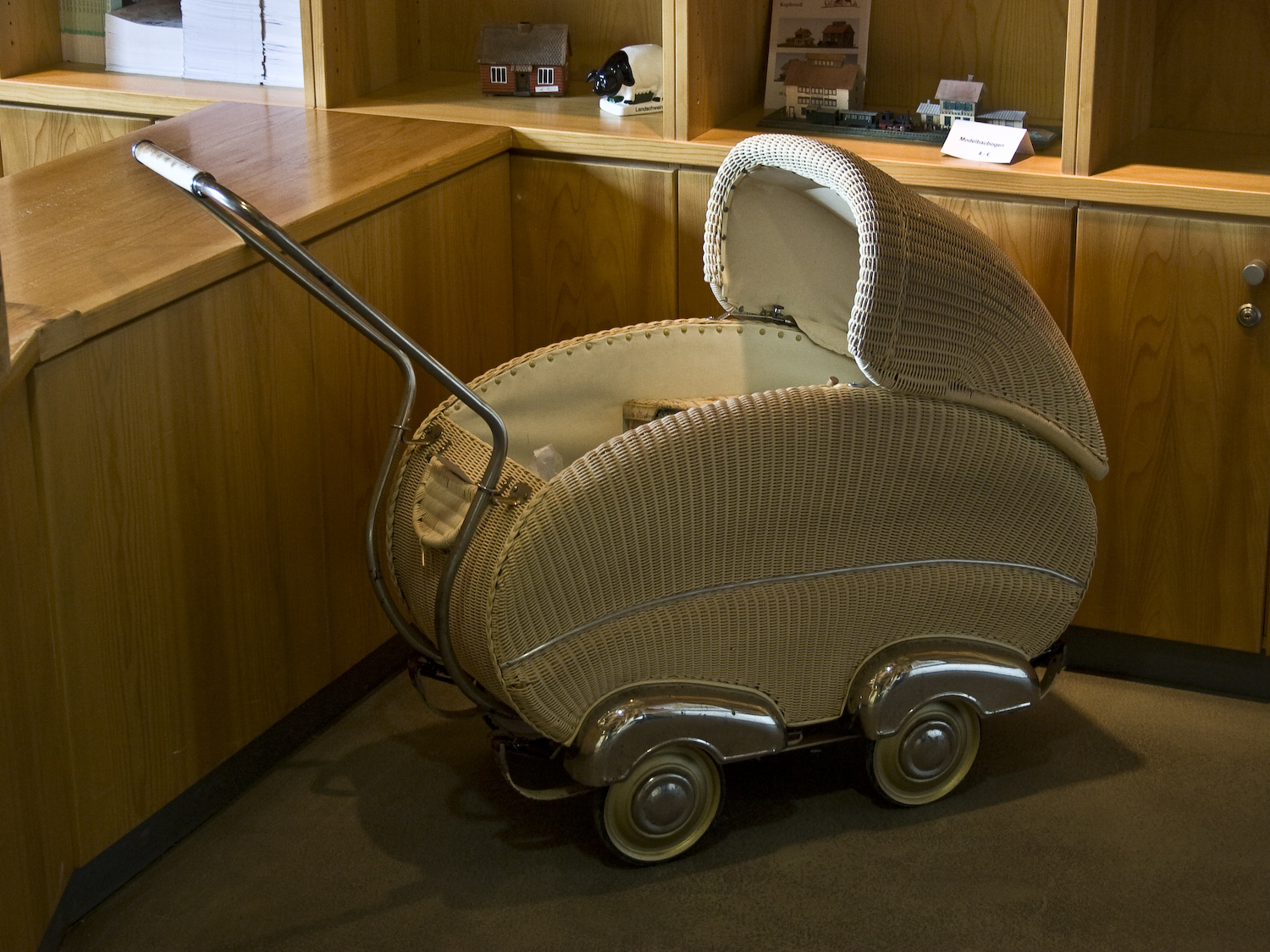
A wicker pram

Various methods of transporting children have been used in different cultures and times. These methods include baby carriages (prams in British English), infant car seats, portable bassinets (carrycots), strollers (pushchairs), slings, backpacks, baskets and bicycle carriers.

The large, heavy prams (short for perambulator), which had become popular during the Victorian era, were replaced by lighter designs during the latter half of the 1900s.

== Baskets, slings and backpacks ==
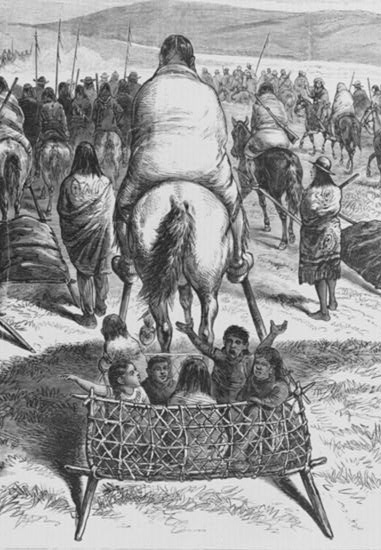
A travois being used to transport infants

Infant carrying likely emerged early in human evolution as the emergence of bipedalism would have necessitated some means of carrying babies who could no longer cling to their mothers and/or simply sit on top of their mother's back. On-the-body carriers are designed in various forms such as baby slings, backpack carriers, and soft front or hip carriers, with varying materials and degrees of rigidity, decoration, support and confinement of the child. Slings, soft front carriers, and "baby carriages" are typically used for infants who lack the ability to sit or to hold their head up. Frame backpack carriers (a modification of the frame backpack), hip carriers, slings, mei tais and a variety of other soft carriers are used for older children.

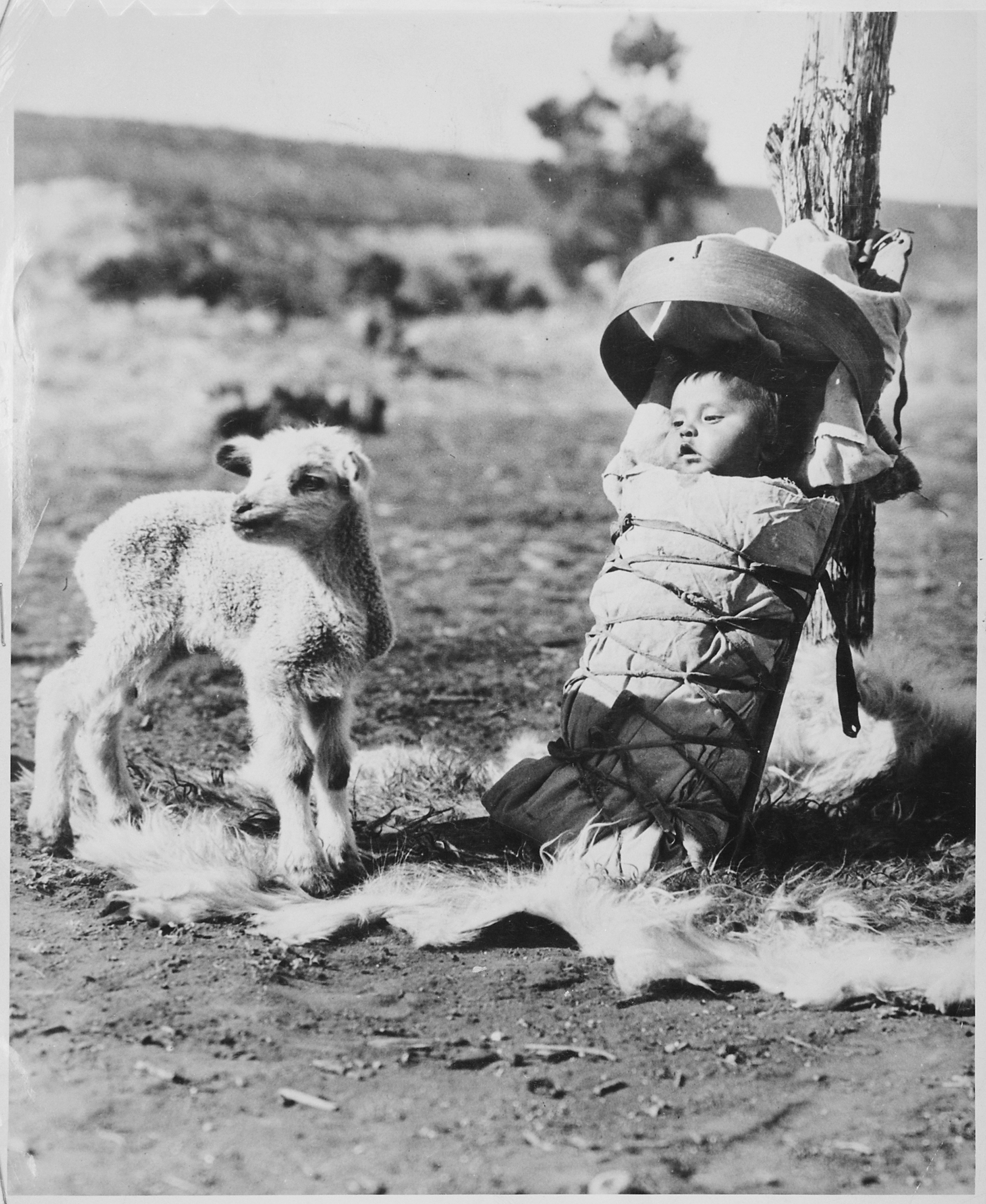
Navajo child in a cradleboard, Window Rock, Arizona, 1936

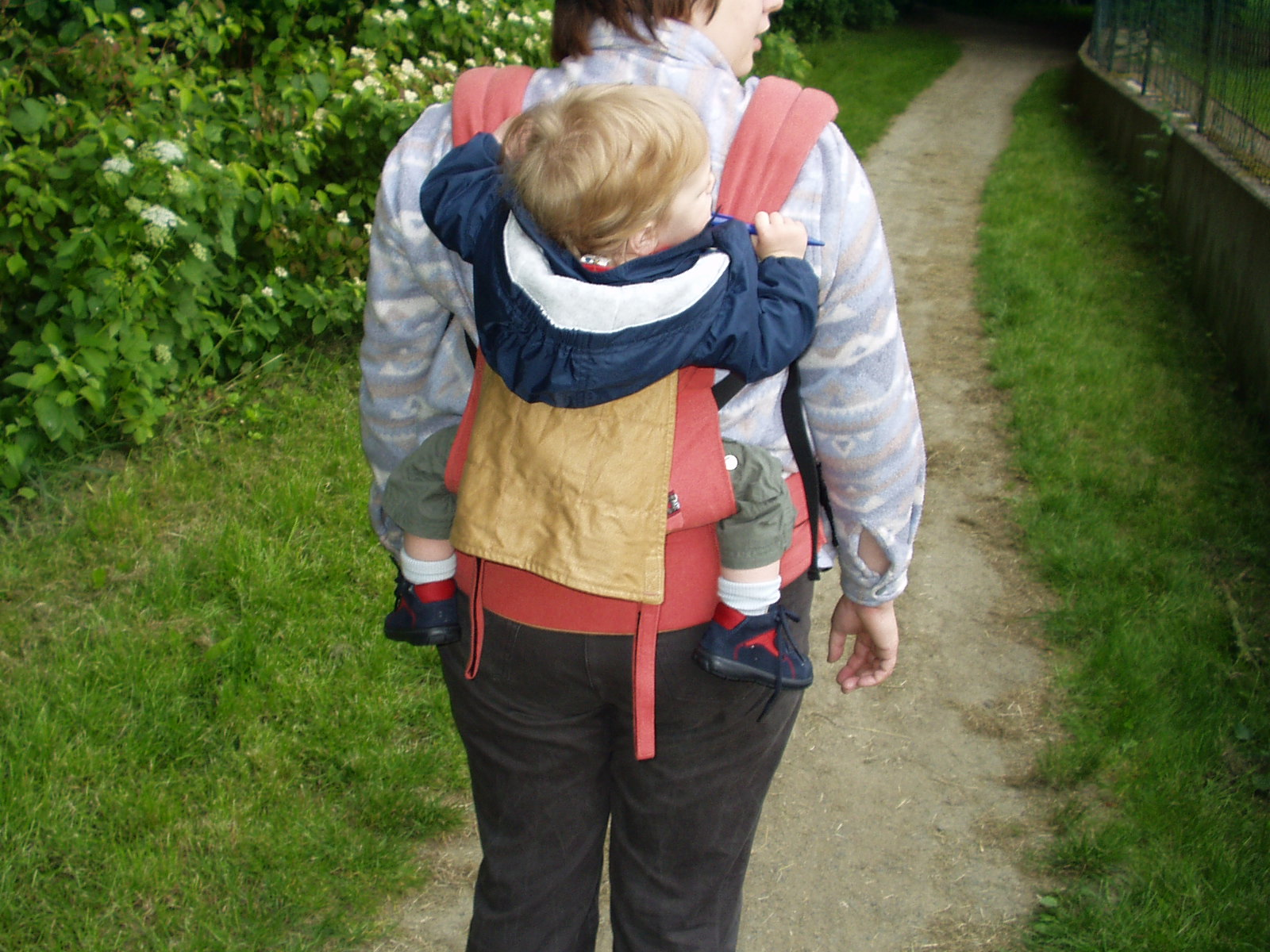
An ergonomic carrier worn on the back

Images of children being carried in slings can be seen in Egyptian artwork dating back to the time of the Pharaohs, and have been used in many indigenous cultures. One of the earliest European artworks showing baby wearing is a fresco by Giotto painted in around 1306 AD, which depicts Mary carrying Jesus in a sling. Baby wearing in a sling was well known in Europe in medieval times, but was mainly seen as a practice of marginalised groups such as beggars and Romani people. A cradleboard is a Native American baby carrier used to keep babies secure and comfortable and at the same time allowing the mothers freedom to work and travel. The cradleboards were attached to the mother's back using straps wrapped around the shoulder or the head. For travel, cradleboards could be hung on a saddle or travois. Ethnographic tradition indicates that it was common practice to cradleboard newborn children until they were able to walk, although many mothers continued to swaddle their children well past the first birthday. Bound and wrapped on a cradleboard, a baby can feel safe and secure. Soft materials such as lichens, moss and shredded bark were used for cushioning and diapers. Cradleboards were either cut from flat pieces of wood or woven from flexible twigs like willow and hazel, and cushioned with soft, absorbent materials. The design of most cradleboards is a flat surface with the child wrapped tightly to it. It is usually only able to move its head.

On-the-body baby carrying started being known in western countries in the 1960s, with the advent of the structured soft pack in the mid-1960s. Around the same time, the frame backpack quickly became a popular way to carry older babies and toddlers. In the early 1970s, the wrap was reintroduced in Germany. The two ringed sling was invented by Rayner and Fonda Garner in 1981 and popularized by Dr William Sears starting in around 1985. In the early 1990s, the modern pouch carrier was created in Hawaii. While the Chinese mei tai has been around in one form or another for centuries, it did not become popular in the west until it was modernized with padding and other adjustments. It first became popular and well known in mid-2003.

Portable cradles, including cradleboards, baskets, and bassinets, have been used by many cultures to carry young infants.

== Wheeled transport methods ==
Wheeled devices are generally divided into prams, used for newborn babies in which the infant normally lies down facing the pusher, and the strollers, which are used for the small child up to about three years old in a sitting position facing forward.

=== History ===
William Kent developed an early stroller in 1733. In 1733, the Duke of Devonshire asked Kent to build a means of transport that would carry his children. Kent obliged by constructing a shell shaped basket on wheels that the children could sit in. This was richly decorated and meant to be pulled by a goat or small pony. Benjamin Potter Crandall sold baby carriages in the US in the 1830s which have been described as the "first baby carriages manufactured in the US". Another early development was F.A. Whitney Carriage Company. His son, Jesse Armour Crandall was issued a number of patents for improvements and additions to the standard models. These included adding a brake to carriages, a model which folded, designs for parasols and an umbrella hanger. By 1840, the baby carriage became extremely popular. Queen Victoria bought three carriages from Hitchings Baby Store.

The carriages of those days were built of wood or wicker and held together by expensive brass joints. These sometimes became heavily ornamented works of art. Models were also named after royalty: Princess and Duchess being popular names, as well as Balmoral and Windsor.

In June 1889, an African American man named William H. Richardson patented his idea of the first reversible stroller. The bassinet was designed so it could face out or in towards the parent. He also made structural changes to the carriage. Until then the axle did not allow each wheel to move separately. Richardson's design allowed this, which increased maneuverability of the carriages. As the 1920s began, prams were now available to all families and were becoming safer, with larger wheels, brakes, deeper prams, and lower, sturdier frames.

In 1965, Owen Maclaren, an aeronautical engineer, worked on complaints his daughter made about travelling from England to America with her heavy pram. Using his knowledge of aeroplanes, Maclaren designed a stroller with an aluminium frame and created the first true umbrella stroller. He then went on to found Maclaren, which manufactured and sold his new design. The design took off and soon "strollers" were easier to transport and used everywhere.

In the 1970s, however, the trend was more towards a more basic version, not fully sprung, and with a detachable body known as a "carrycot". (Note: The modern equivalent—for babies that cannot walk—is a pram with a body that can be detached for carrying or for attaching to a frame to become a car seat (a "travel system").) Now, prams are very rarely used, being large and expensive when compared with "buggies" (see below). One of the longer lived and better known brands in the UK is Silver Cross, first manufactured in Hunslet, Leeds, in 1877, and later Guiseley from 1936 until 2002 when the factory closed. Silver Cross was then bought by the toy company David Halsall and Sons who relocated the head office to Skipton and expanded into a range of new, modern baby products including pushchairs and "travel systems". They continue to sell the traditional Silver Cross coach prams which are manufactured at a factory in Bingley in Yorkshire.

Since the 1980s, the stroller industry has developed with new features, safer construction and more accessories.

=== Prams ===
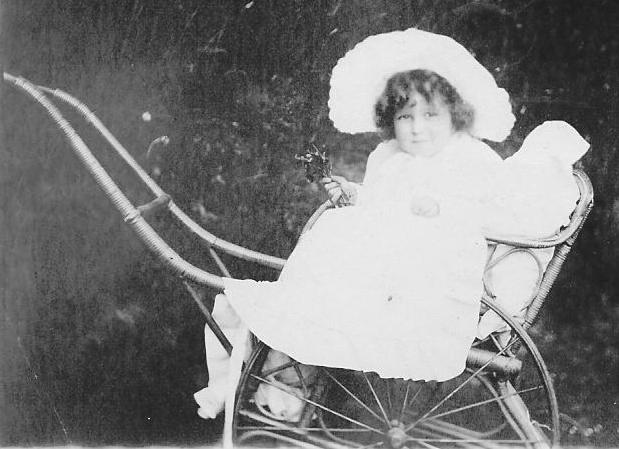
A pram in Assam, India, about 1902

Larger and heavier prams, or perambulators, had been used since their introduction in the Victorian era; prams were also used for infants, often sitting up. The term carrycot became more common in the UK after the introduction of lighter units with detachable baby carriers in the 1970s.

As they developed through the years suspension was added, making the ride smoother for both the baby and the person pushing it.

The word pram is etymologically a shortening of its now less common synonym perambulator.

=== Strollers ===
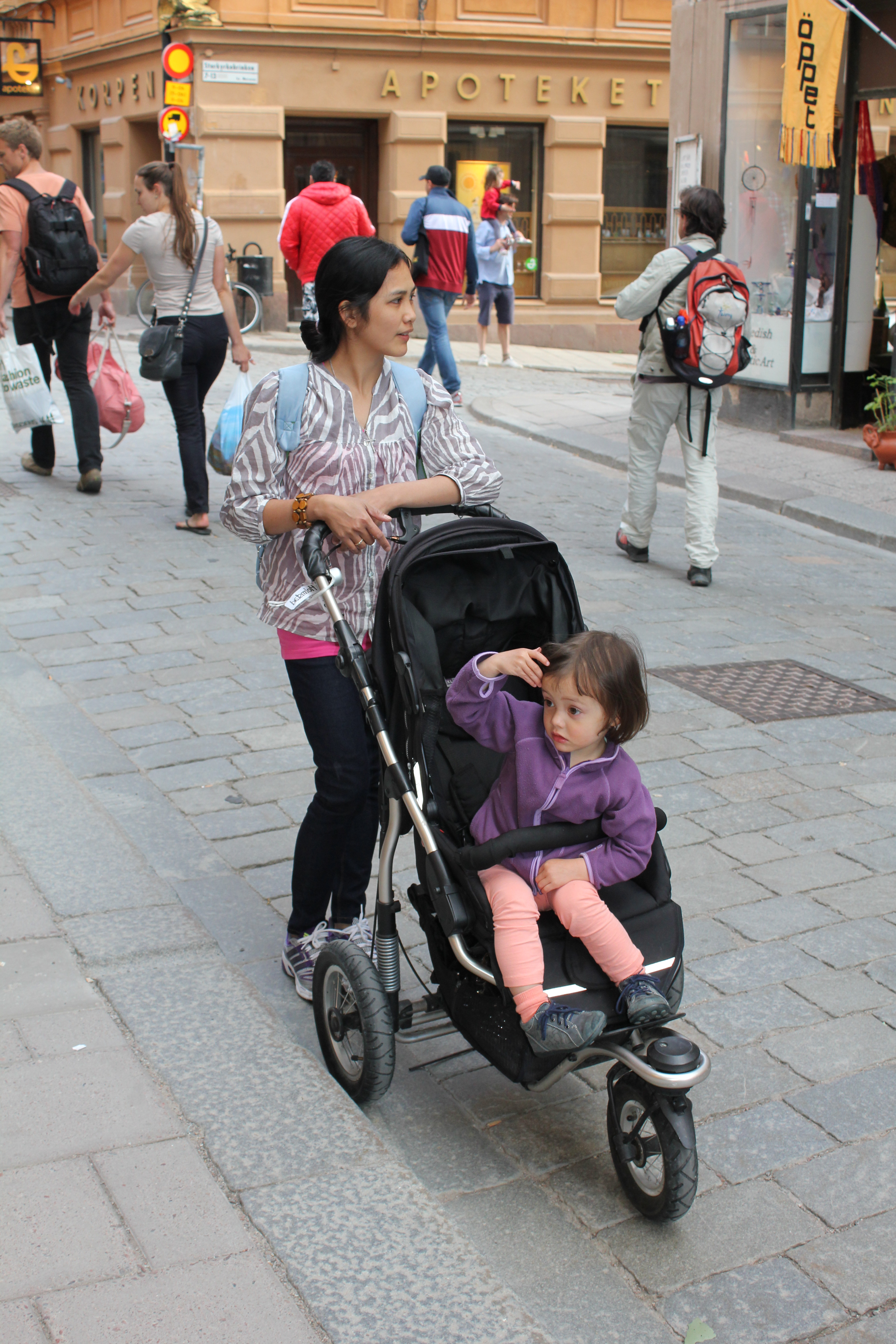
A child being pushed in a stroller

"Strollers" or "pushchairs/buggies" (British English) are used for small children up to about three years old in a sitting position facing forward.

"Pushchair" was the popularly used term in the UK between its invention and the early 1980s, when a more compact design known as a "buggy" became the trend, popularised by the conveniently collapsible aluminium-framed Maclaren buggy designed and patented by the British aeronautical designer Owen Maclaren in 1965. "Buggy" is the usual term in the UK (sometimes "pushchair"); in American English, buggy usually refers to a four-wheeled vehicle known as a quad or quad bike in the UK. "Stroller" is the usual term in the USA. Newer versions can be configured to carry a baby lying down like a low pram and then be reconfigured to carry the child in the forward-facing position.

A variety of twin pushchairs are manufactured, some designed for babies of a similar age (such as twins) and some for those with a small age gap. Triple pushchairs are a fairly recent addition, due to the number of multiple births being on the increase. Safety guidelines for standard pushchairs apply. Most triple buggies have a weight limit of 50 kg and recommended use for children up to the age of four years.

A travel system is typically a set consisting of a chassis with a detachable baby seat and/or carrycot. Thus a travel system can be switched between a pushchair and a pram. Another benefit of a travel system is that the detached chassis (generally an umbrella closing chassis) when folded will usually be smaller than other types, to transport it in a car trunk or boot. Also, the baby seat will snap into a base meant to stay in an automobile, becoming a car seat. This allows undisturbed movement of the baby into or out of a car and a reduced chance of waking a sleeping baby.

Another modern design showcases a stroller that includes the possibility for the lower body to be elongated, thereby transforming the stroller into a kick scooter. Steering occurs by leaning towards either side. Depending on the model, it can be equipped with a foot- and/or handbrake. Speeds up to 15 km/h (10 mph) can be reached. The first stroller of this kind was the so-called "Roller Buggy", developed by industrial designer Valentin Vodev in 2005. In 2012 the manufacturer Quinny became interested in the concept and teamed up with a Belgian studio to design another model.

The modern infant car seat is a relative latecomer. It is used to carry a child within a car. Such car seats are required by law in many countries to safely transport young children.

In contemporary culture, with four-figure systems or sleek jogging strollers common in some circles, strollers often serve as not only an infant transport device but also a highly visible symbol of everything from class to parenting philosophy.

== Others ==
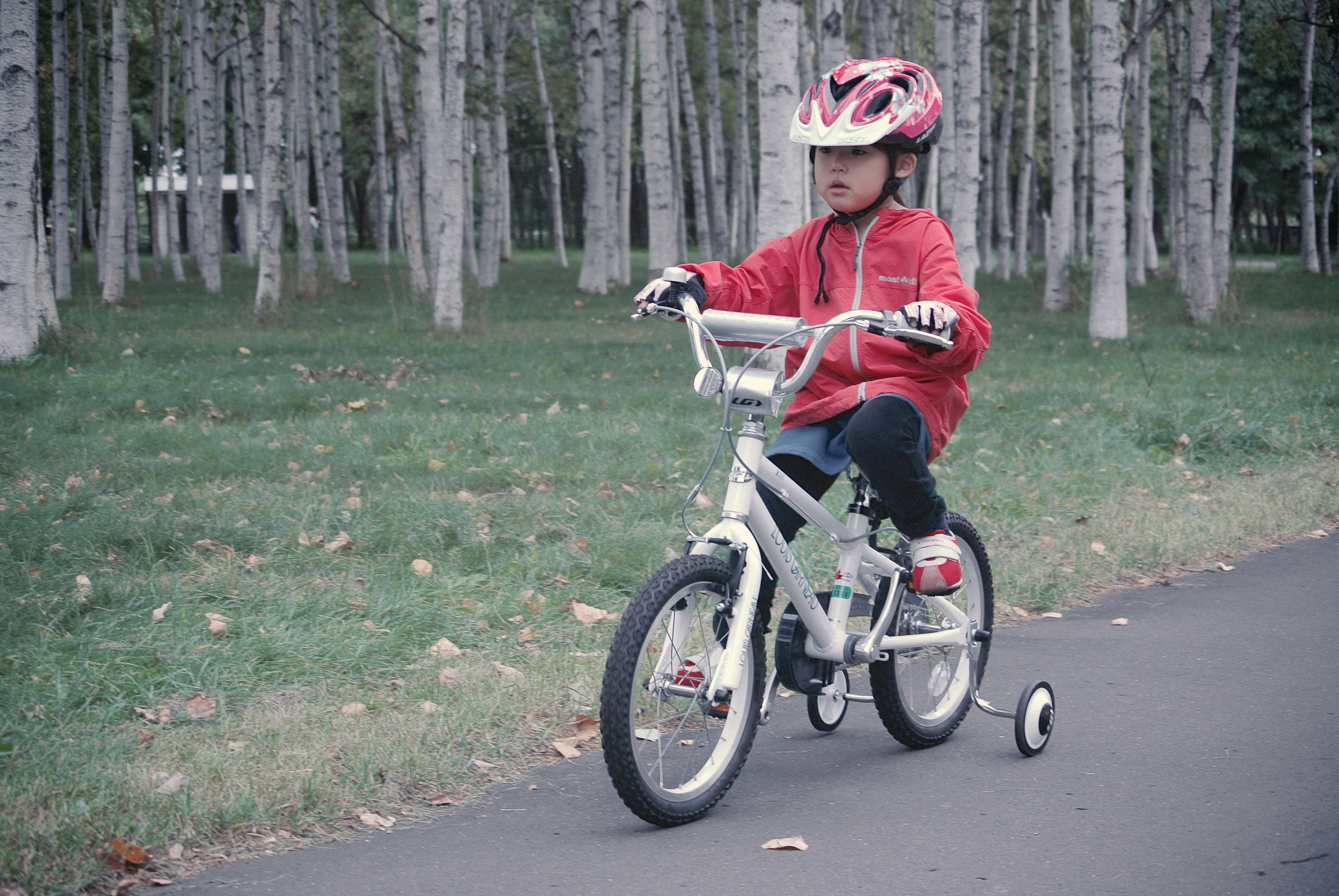
A child rides her own bike

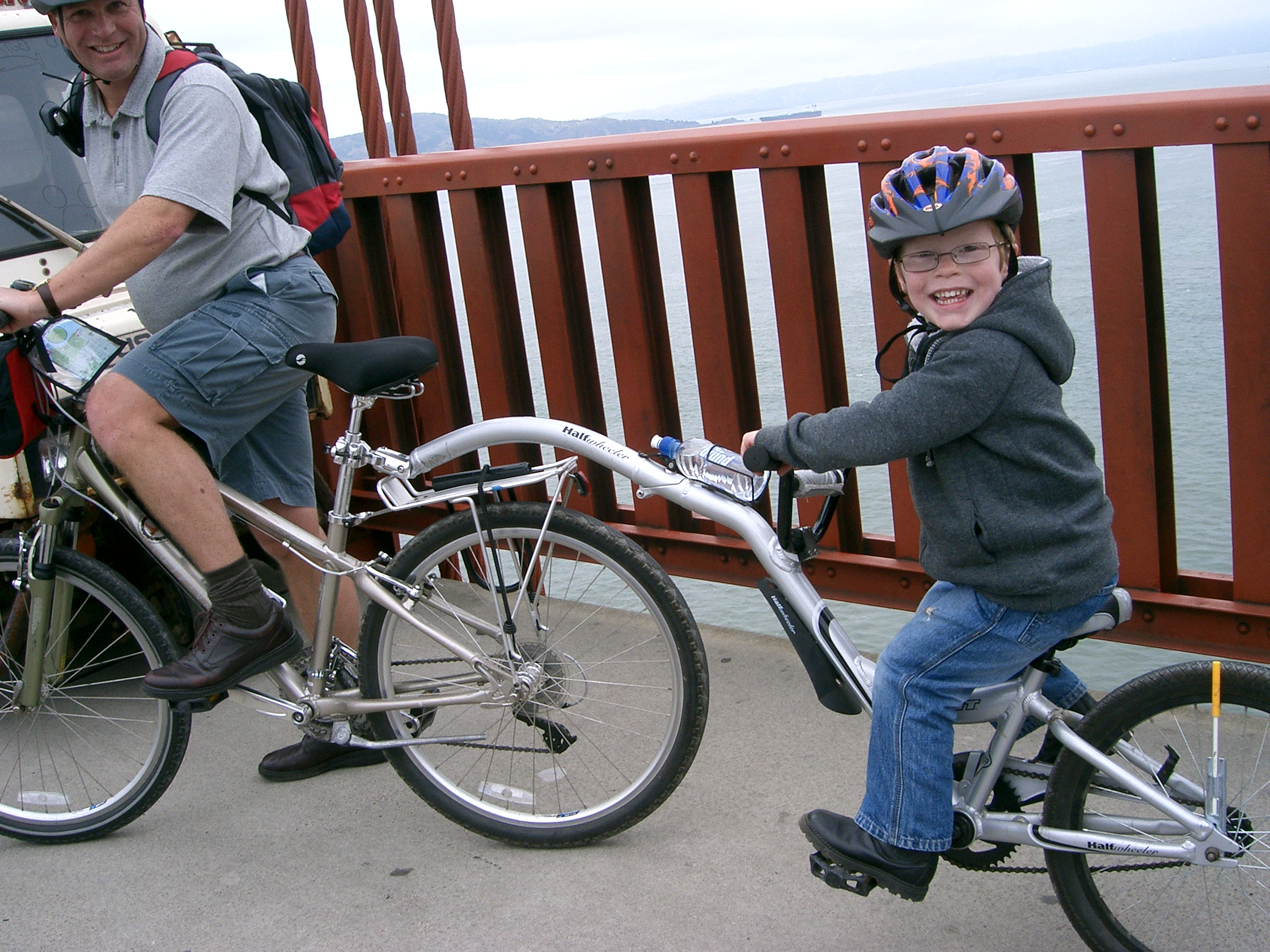
A child rides a one-wheel trailer bike

Bicycles can be fitted with a bicycle trailer or a children's bicycle seat to carry small children. An older child can ride his own bike, or ride a one-wheel trailer bike with an integrated seat and handle bars.

A "travel system" includes a car seat base, an infant car seat, and a baby stroller. The car seat base is installed in a car. The infant car seat snaps into the car seat base when traveling with a baby. From the car, the infant car seat can be hand carried and snapped onto the stroller.

== Gallery ==
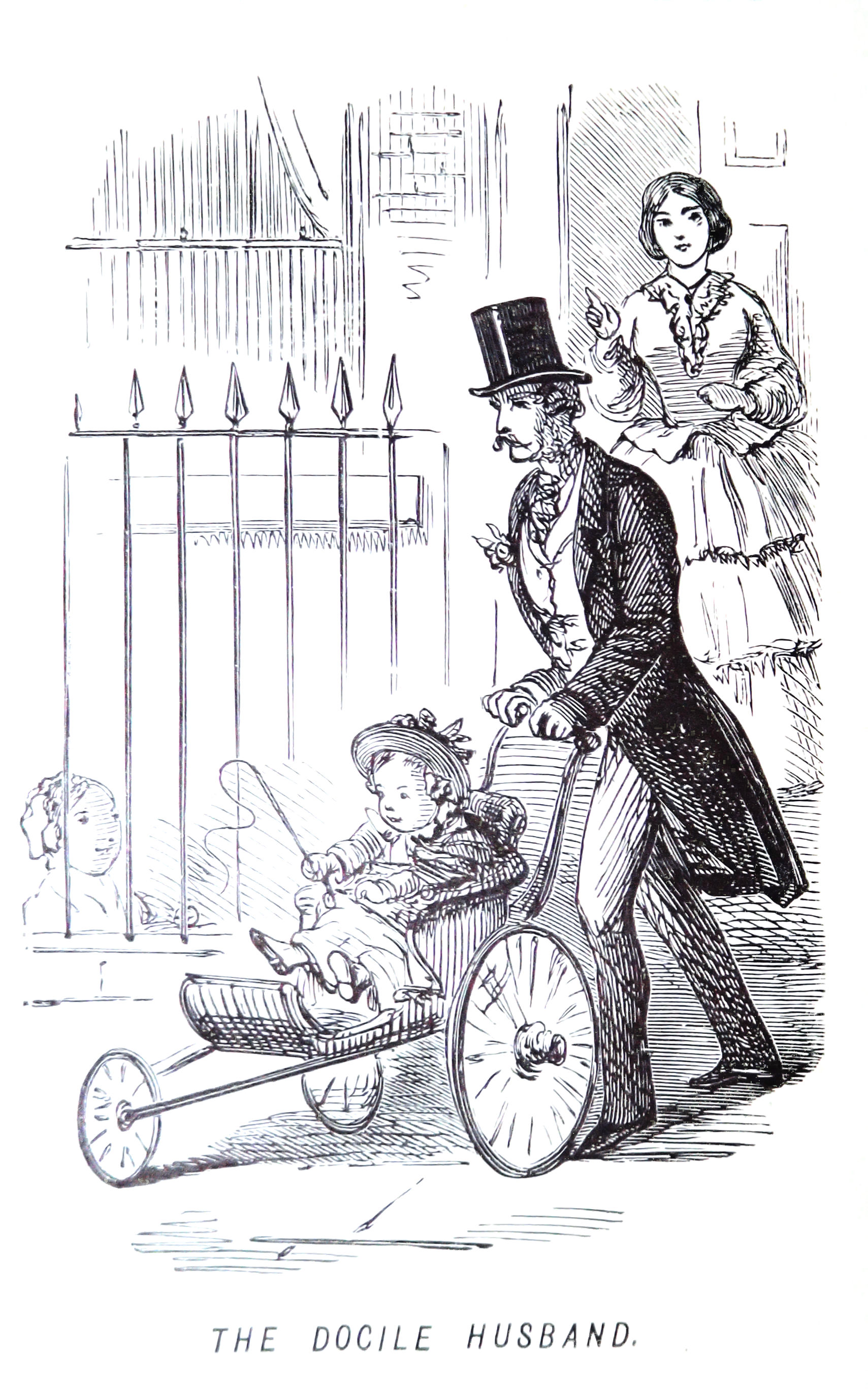
An 1847 stroller from the John Leech Archives

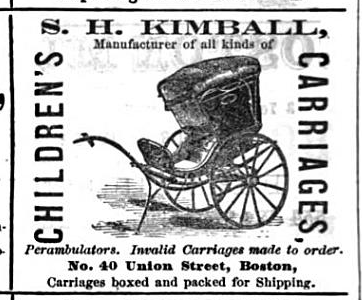
An advertisement for an early perambulator in the 1868 Boston Directory

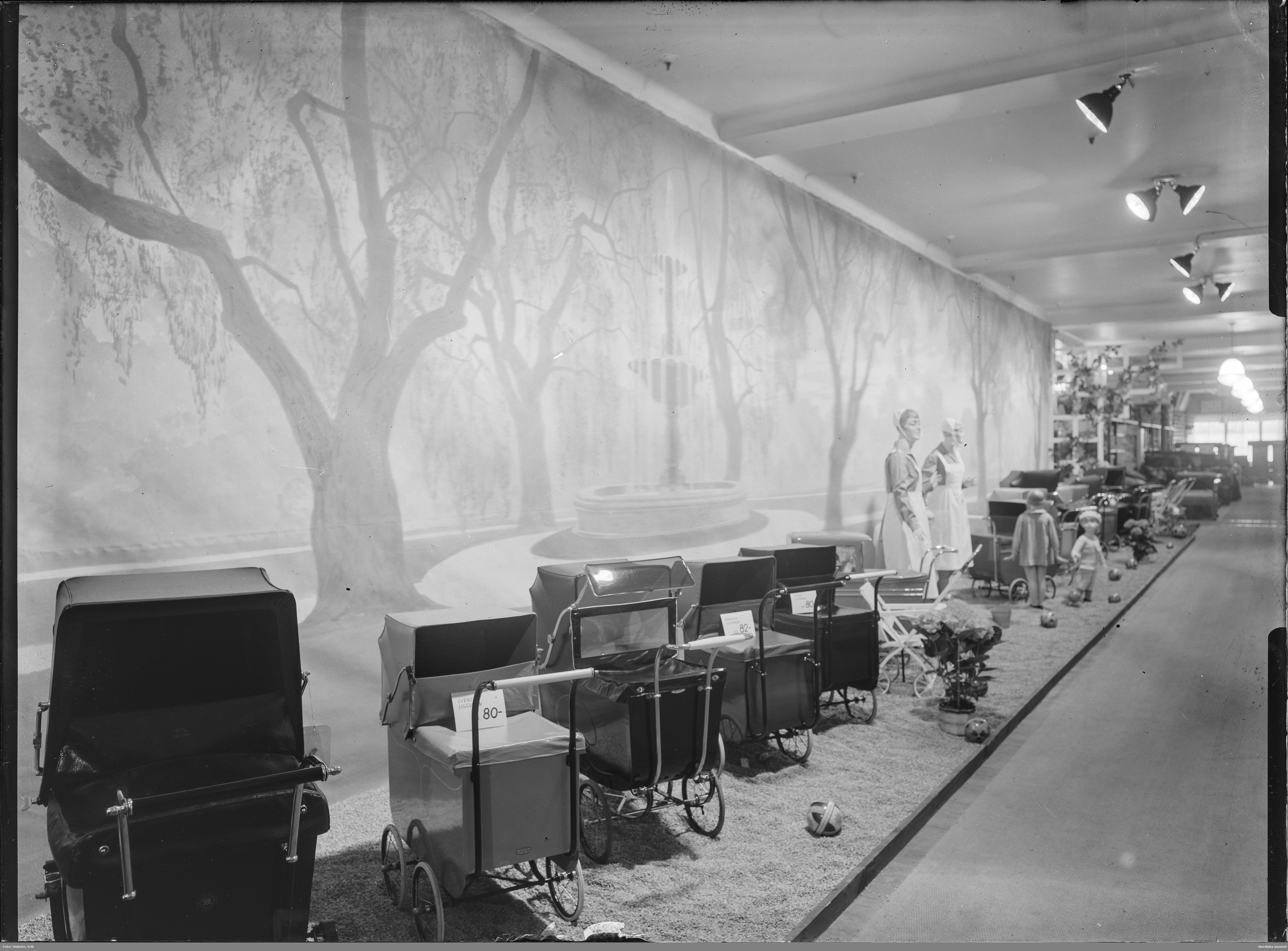
Baby carriages for sale in Stockholm, Sweden in 1931

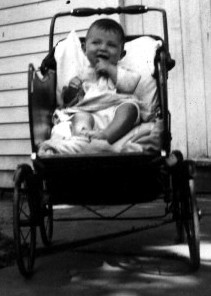
A baby in a buggy, United States, 1935

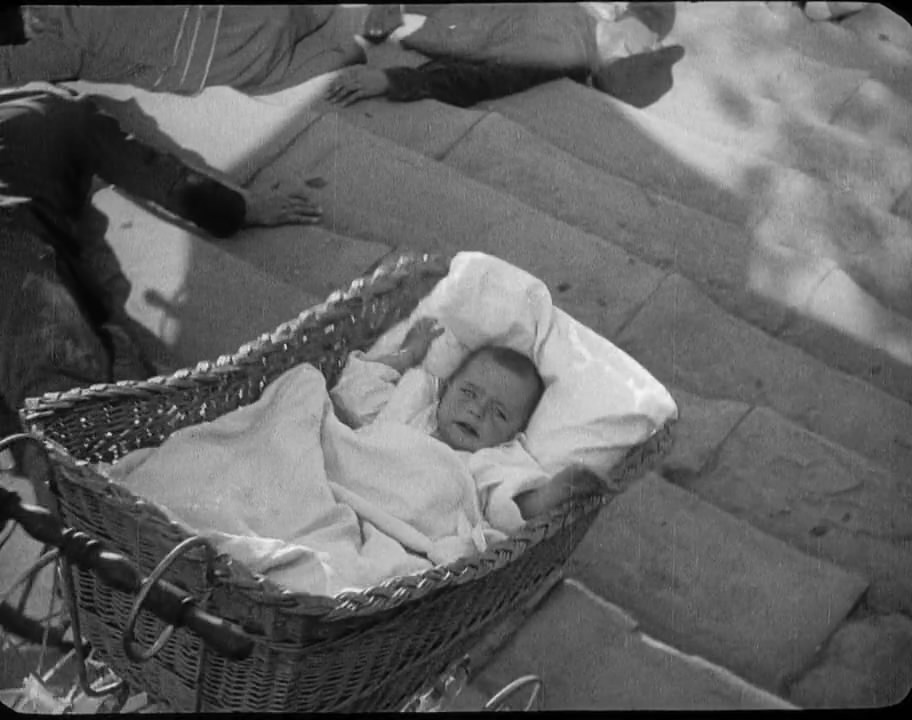
A pram in the 'Odessa Steps scene' from the 1926 film Battleship Potemkin

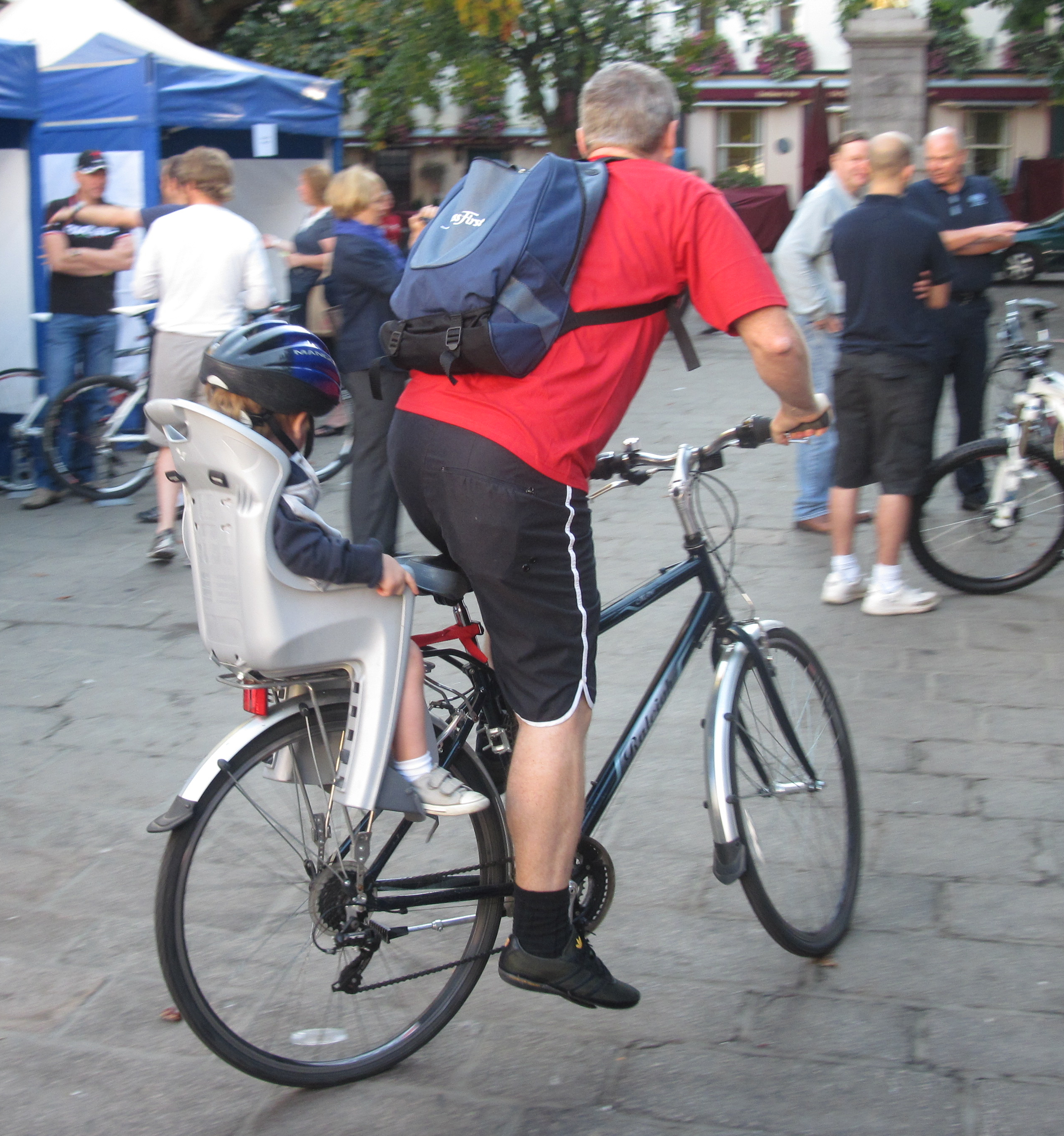
A child in a bicycle carrier

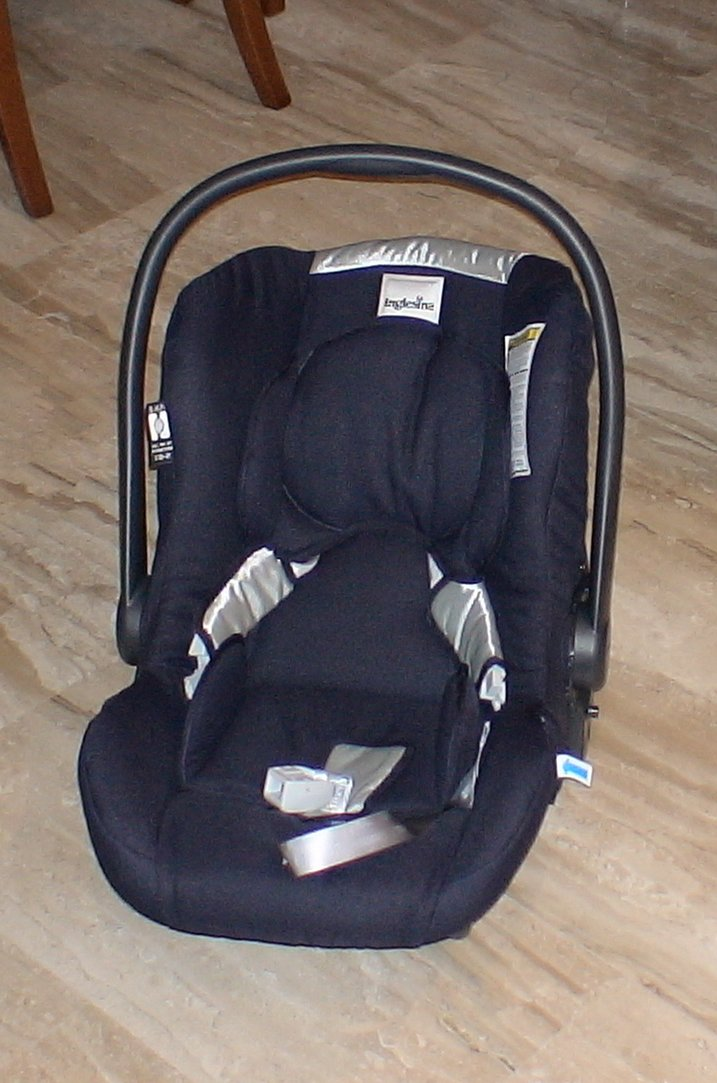
A car seat for infants

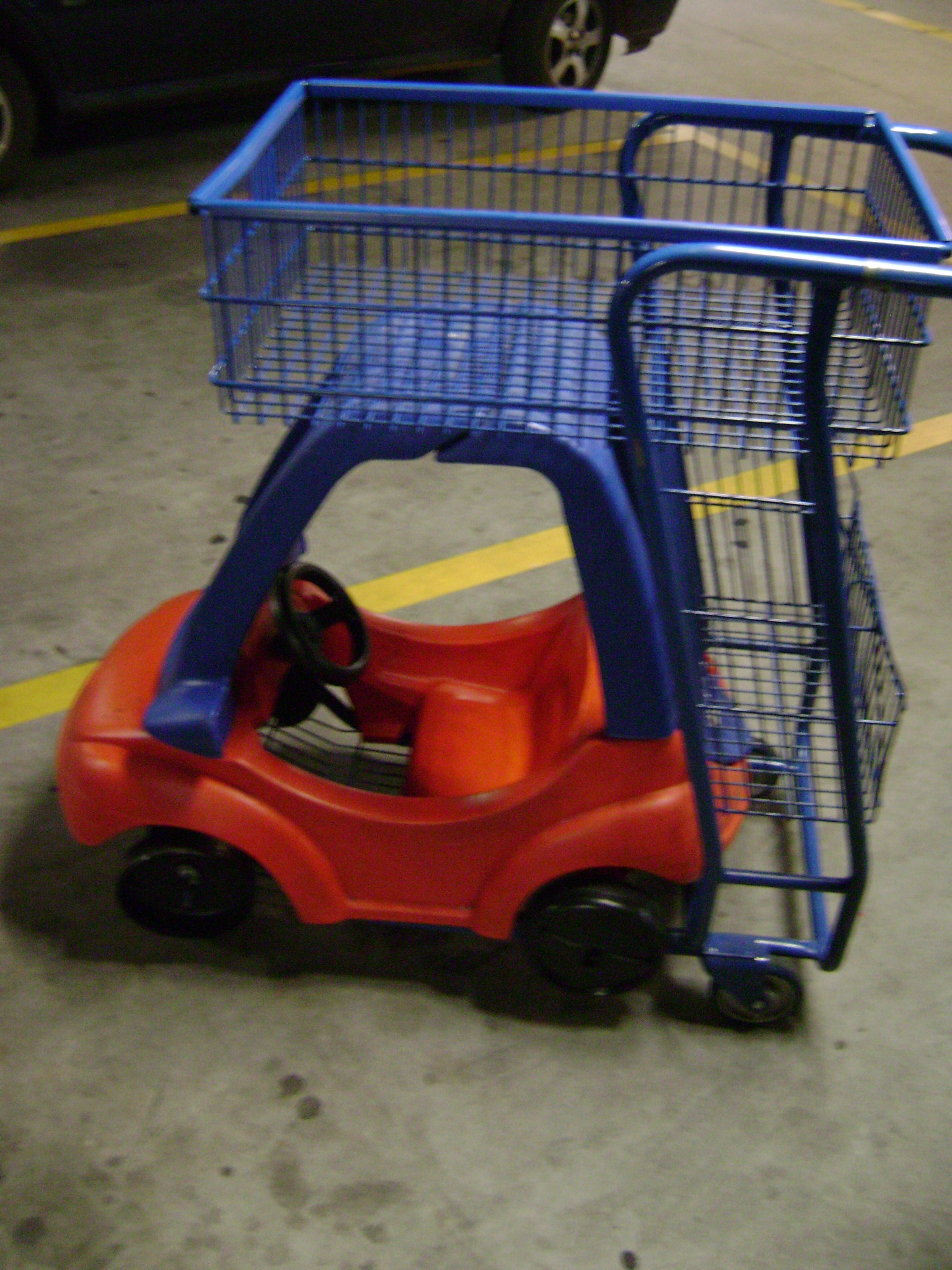
A shopping cart with space for a small child

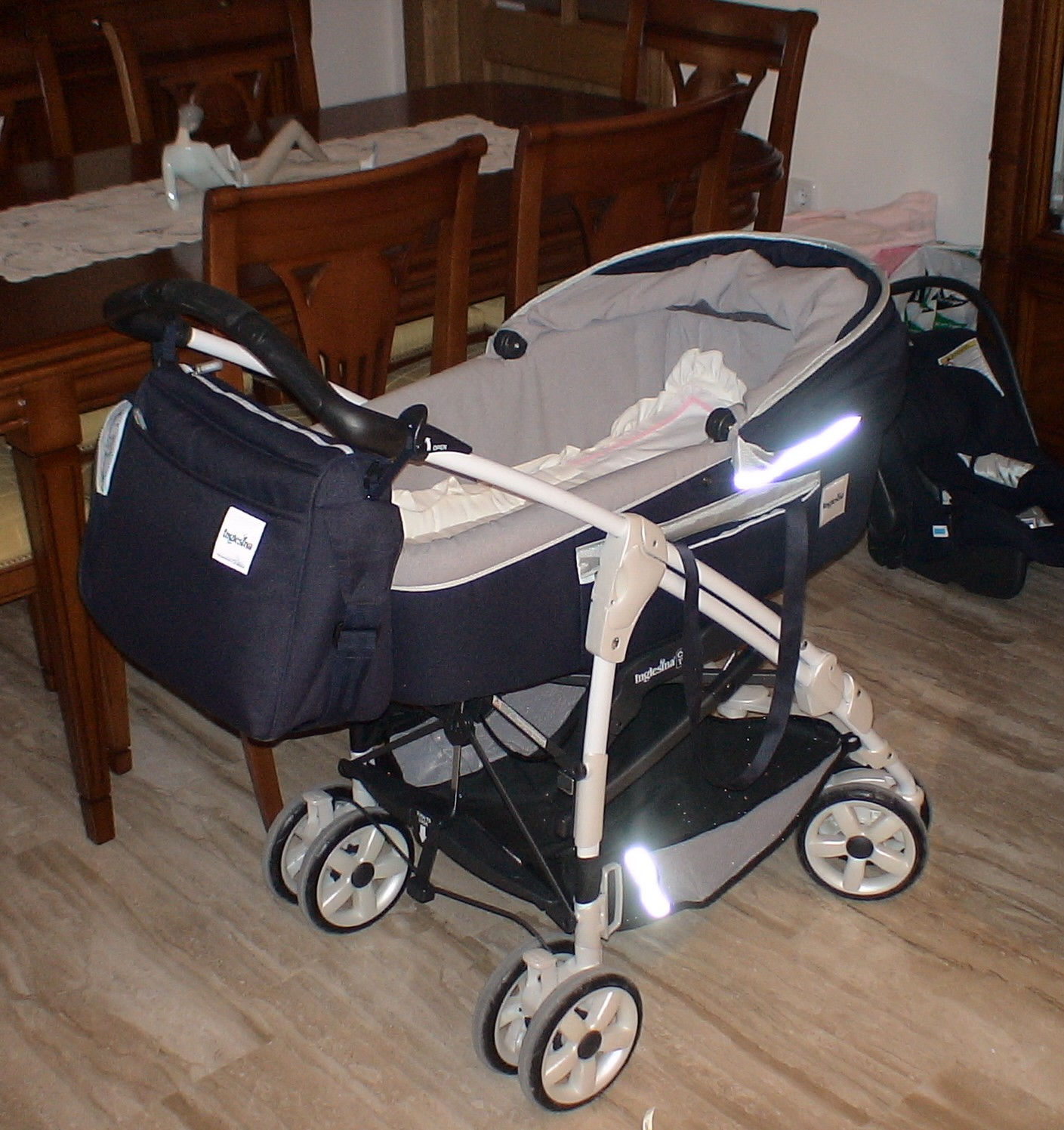
A 3-in-1 travel system

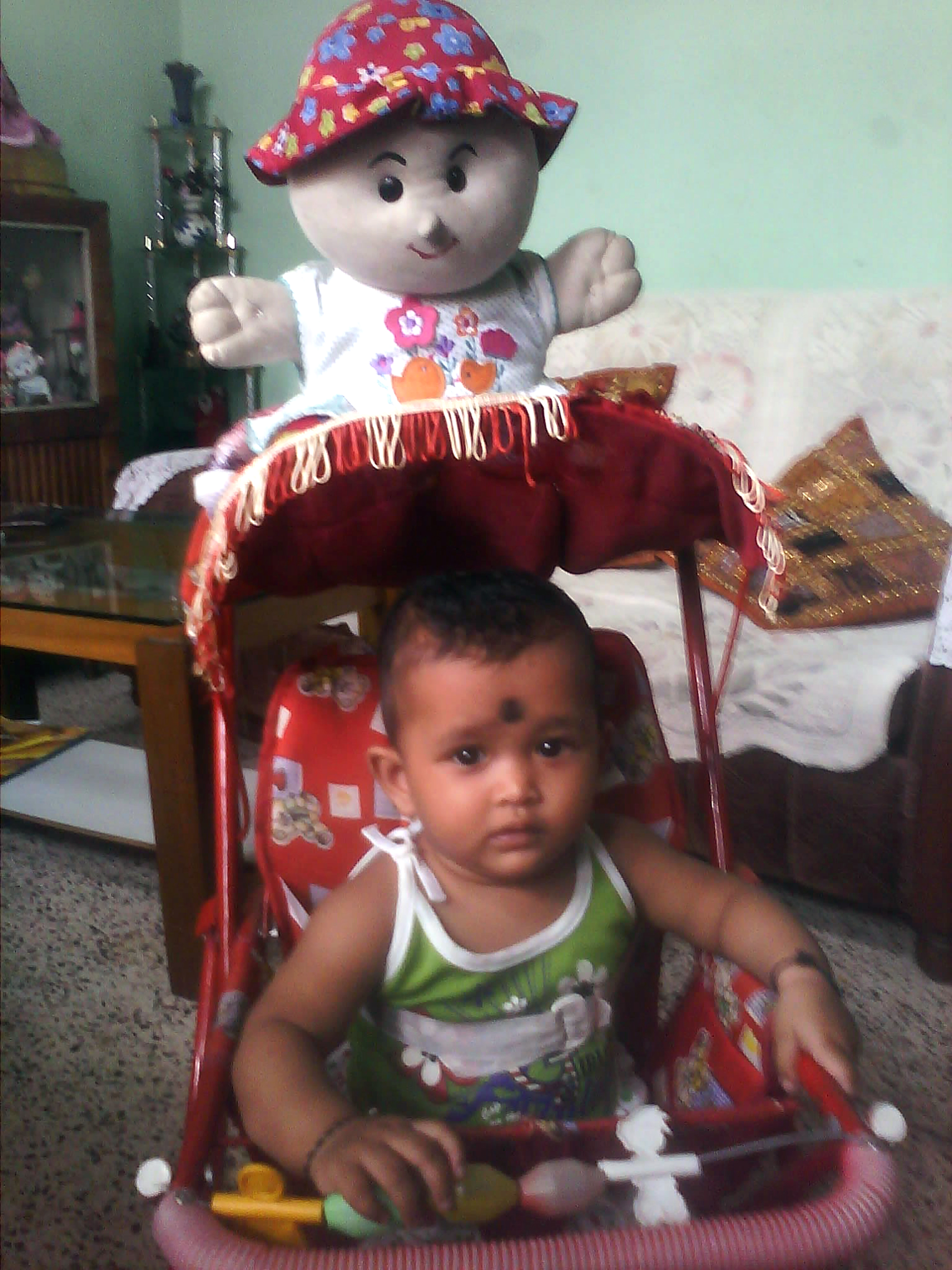
A baby sitting in a stroller with a doll above her head

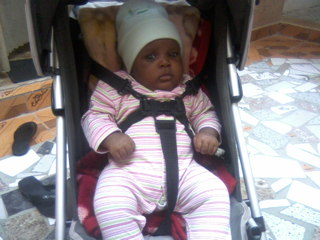
A baby in a stroller with belts holding her in place

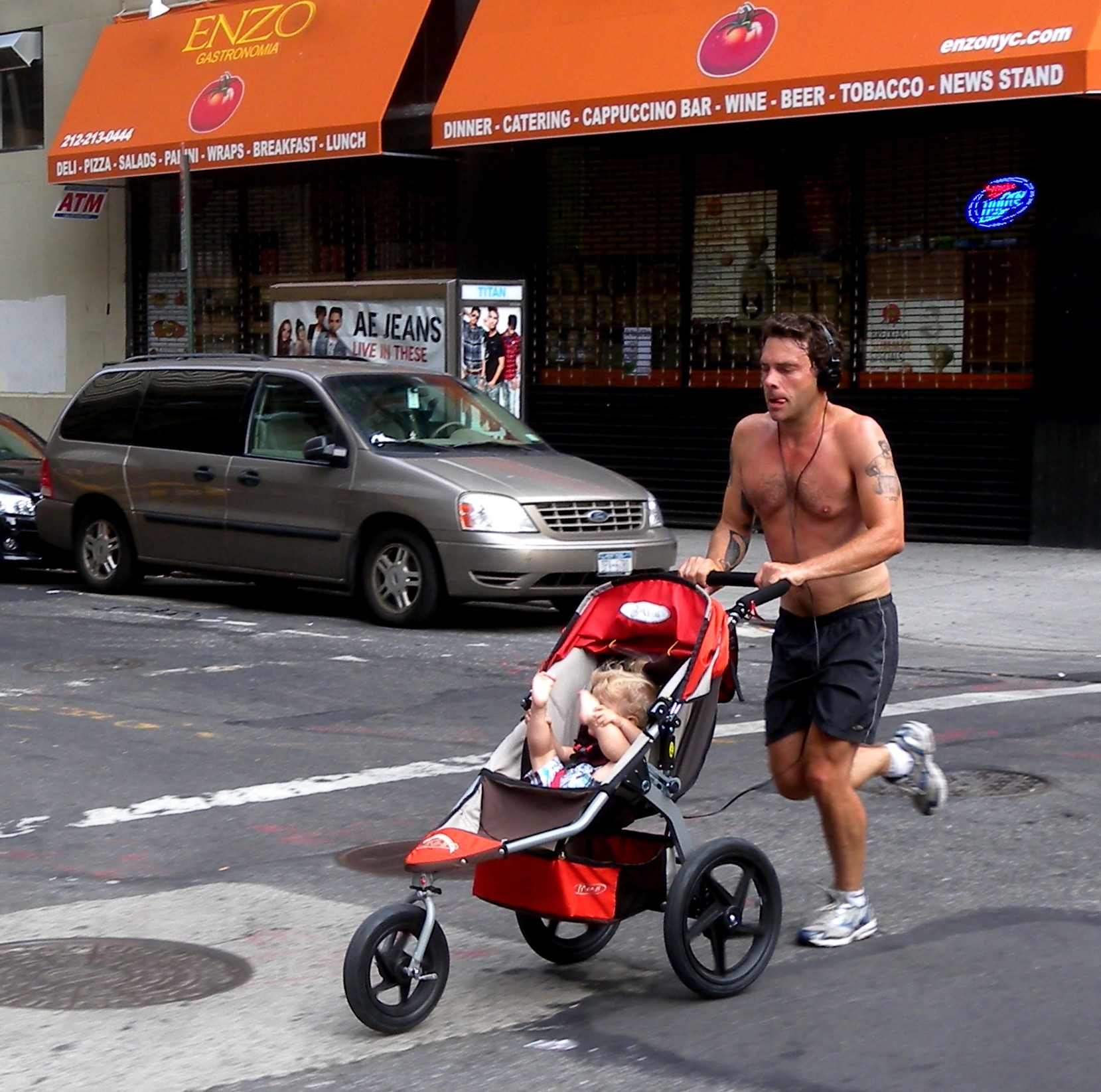
A jogging stroller on Park Avenue, New York City

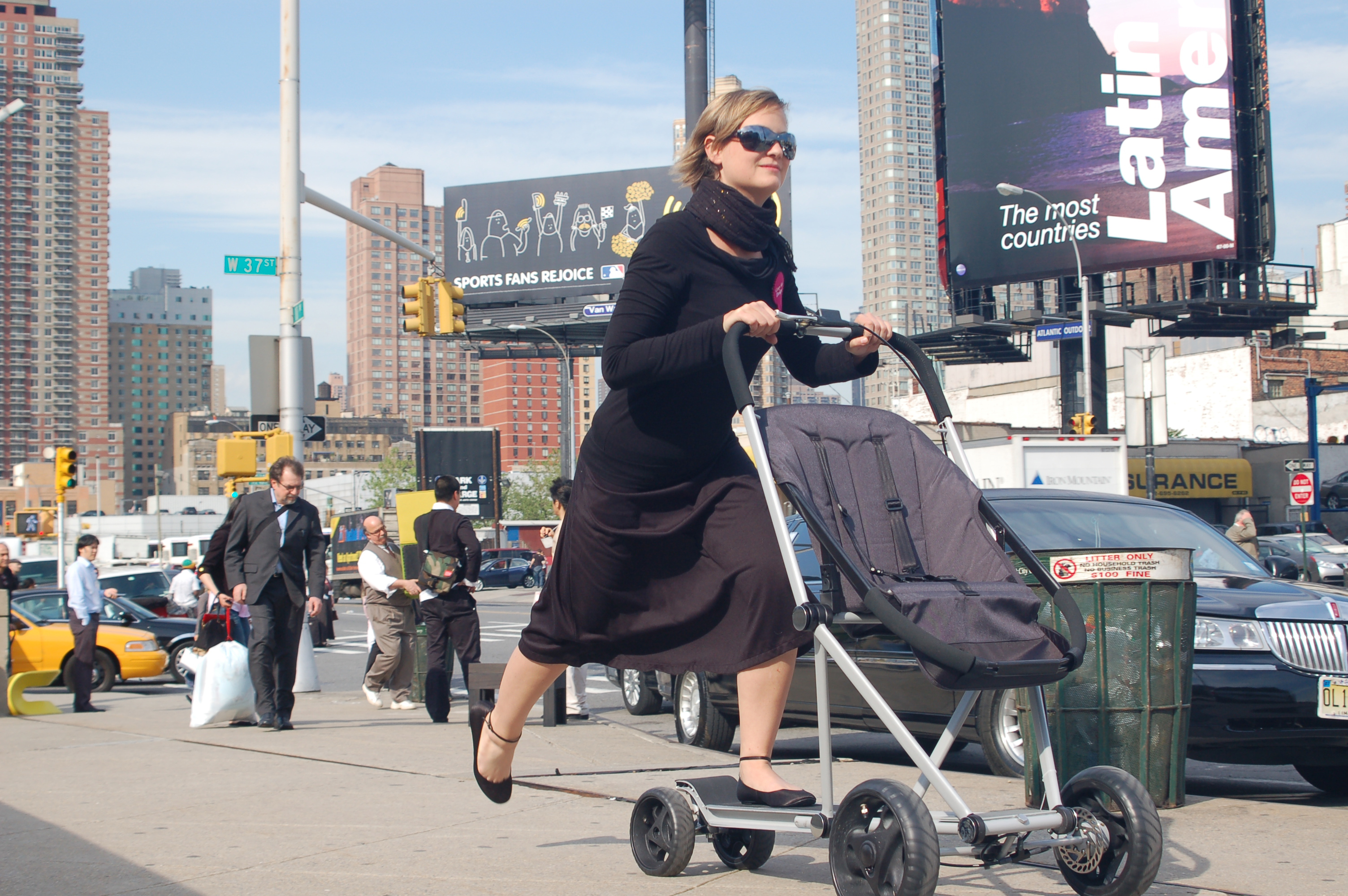
A roller buggy

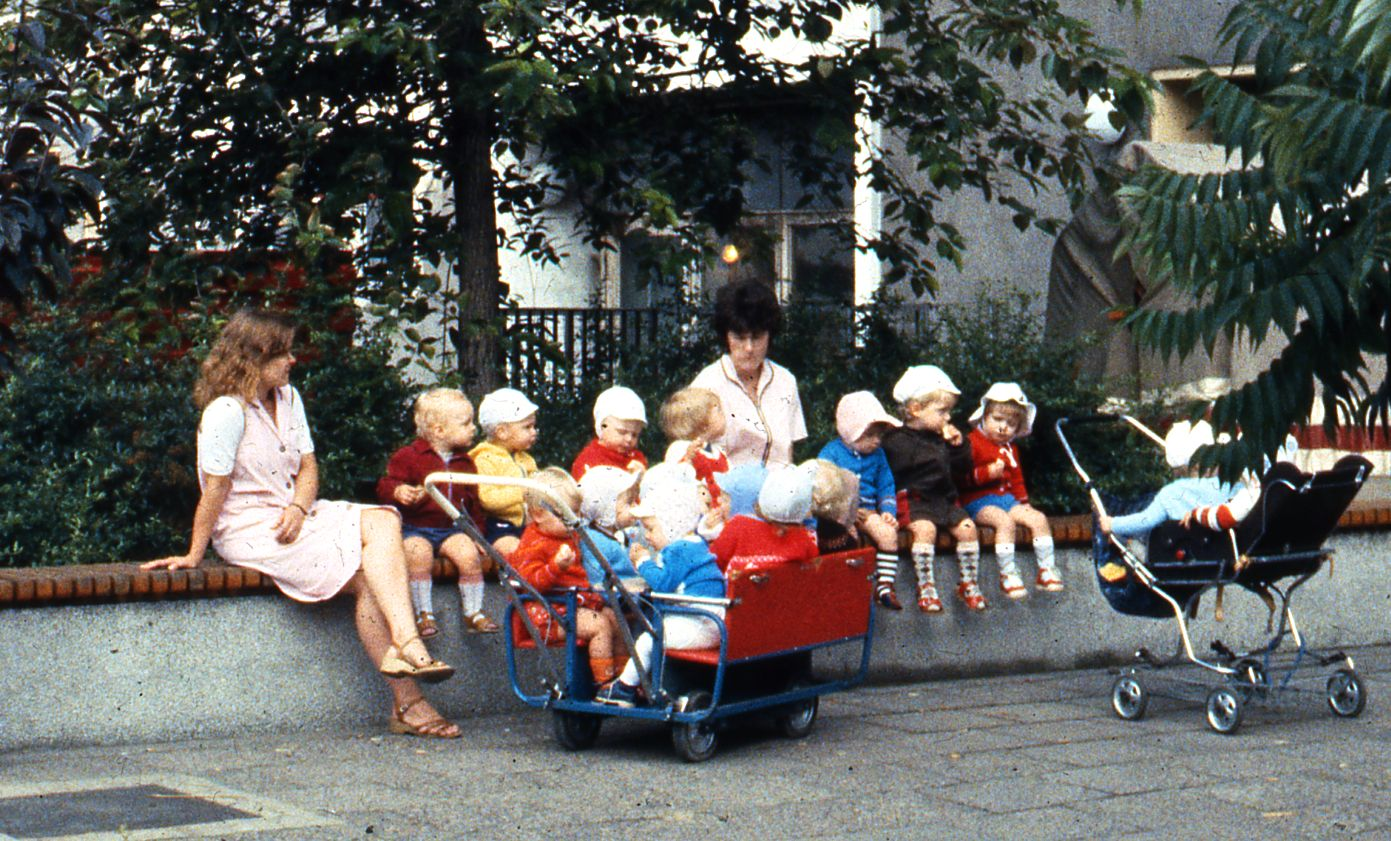
East Berlin child minders, with multiple-seat prams in 1984

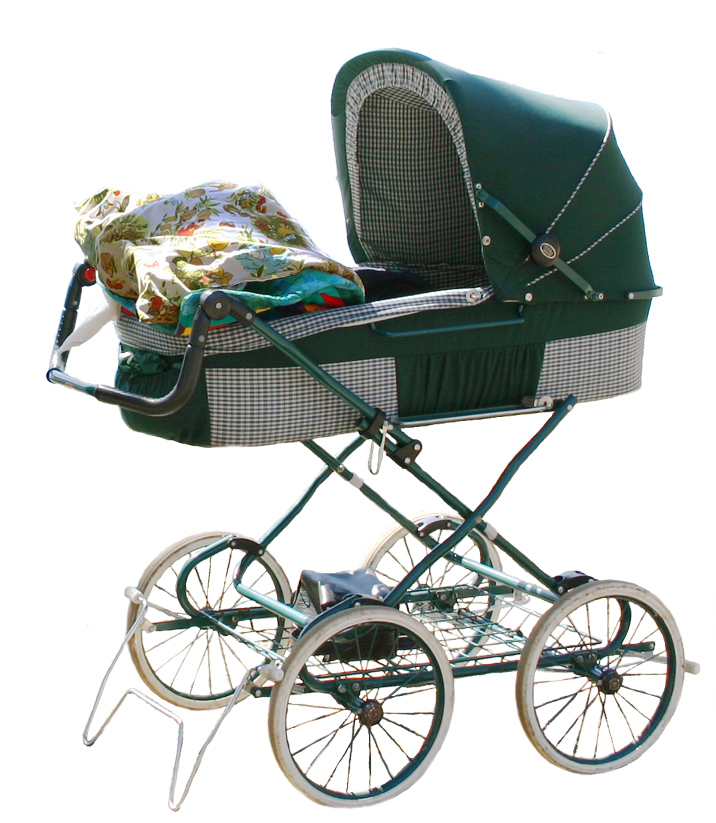
A perambulator

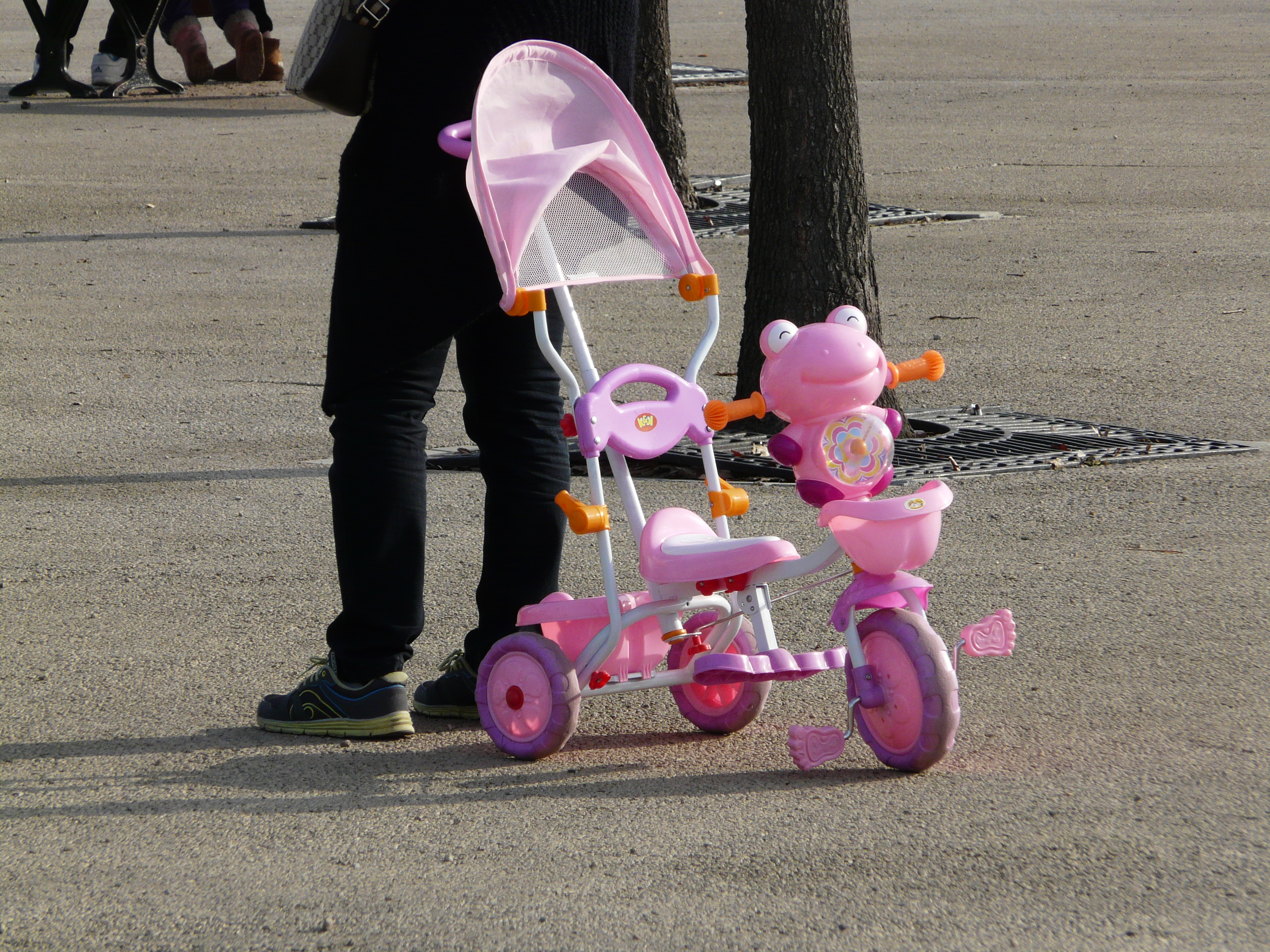
Baby tricycle

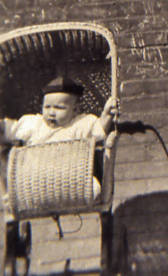
Wicker baby buggy from 1908

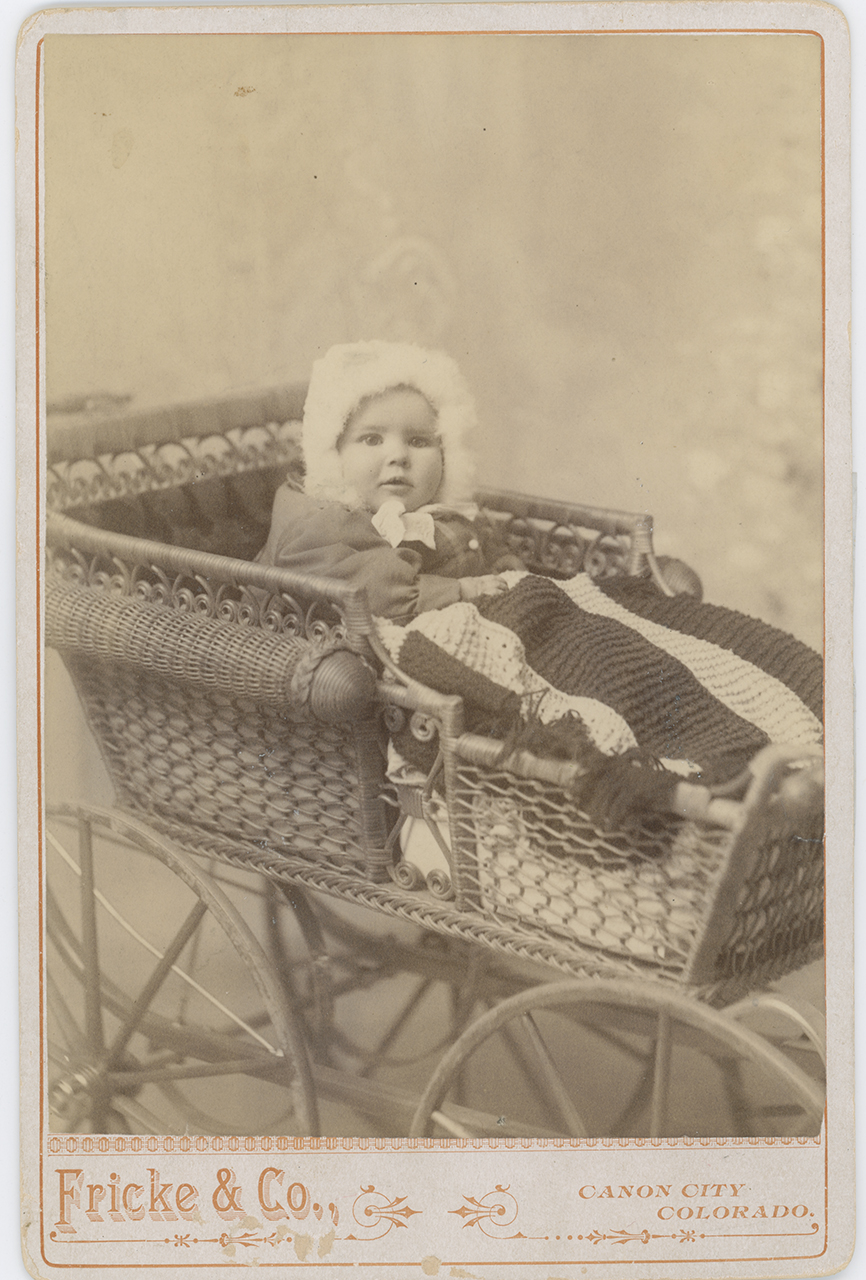
Portrait of child in wicker stroller, 1894

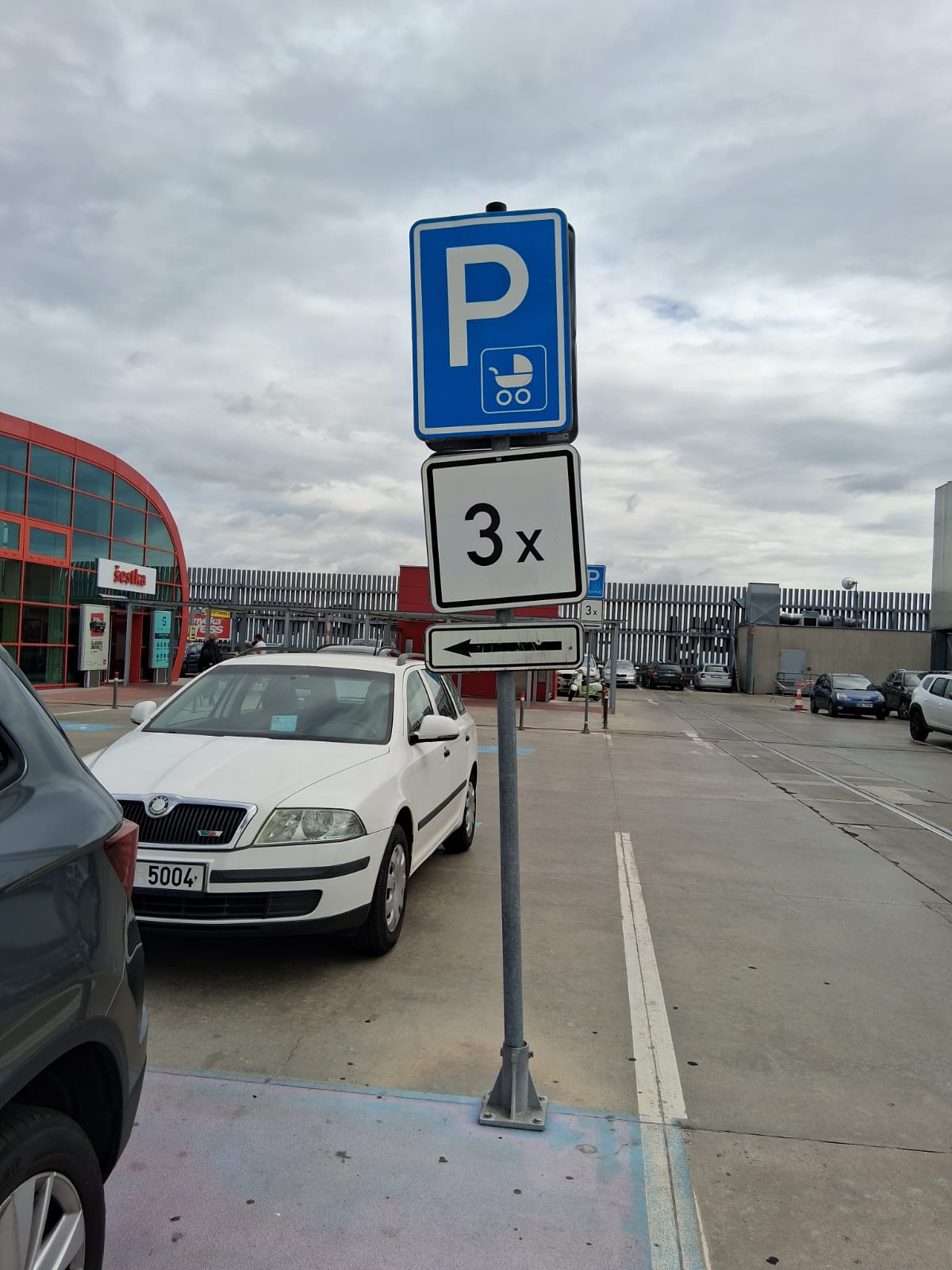
Reserved parking space for persons with stroller (road sign in the Czech Republic)

== See also ==
- Baby walker
- Babywearing
- Bedside sleeper
- Doll pram
- Moses basket
- Shopping cart
- Travel cot

== Bibliography ==
- Fontanel, Beatrice (October 1, 1998). Babies Celebrated. Harry N. Abrams. ISBN 0-8109-4012-4.
- van Hout, I. C. (1993). Beloved Burdens. Koninklijk Instituut voor de Tropen.
