= Little Village (charity) =

English charity

Little Village is an English charity, which operates "baby banks" to provide clothes, toys, and equipment for babies and young children aged 0 to 5 years in London. Goods are donated mostly by individuals, and parents in need can collect or be sent a "bundle" of items for each child in the household including clothing, toys, and toiletries, as well as bigger equipment such as beds and pushchairs. Families can return every 3 months to receive material support for a child, until the child is 5 years old.

Little Village was founded by Sophia Parker in 2016 to help communities to share baby equipment locally.

It is one of the four charities to which the Duke and Duchess of Sussex suggested people might donate instead of sending gifts for their newborn baby in 2019. In June 2022, Kate Middleton visited one of Little Village’s sites, located in Brent.

In 2020, CEO Sophia Parker reported to Camden council that they had given out 6,000 support bundles in the past year, double the number of the previous year. In 2021, they reported that they had supported 11,000 children since the charity was founded in 2016.

The charity currently operates sites in Tooting, Balham, Roehampton, Kings Cross, Hounslow, Hackney, and Wembley.

The charity's 2023 Impact Report recorded that in the year it had supported 8,529 children in 5,815 families, and had provided items including 1,081 buggies and 7,747 coats.
