= Long Buckby =

Village in Northamptonshire, England

Coordinates: 52.303°N 1.081°W

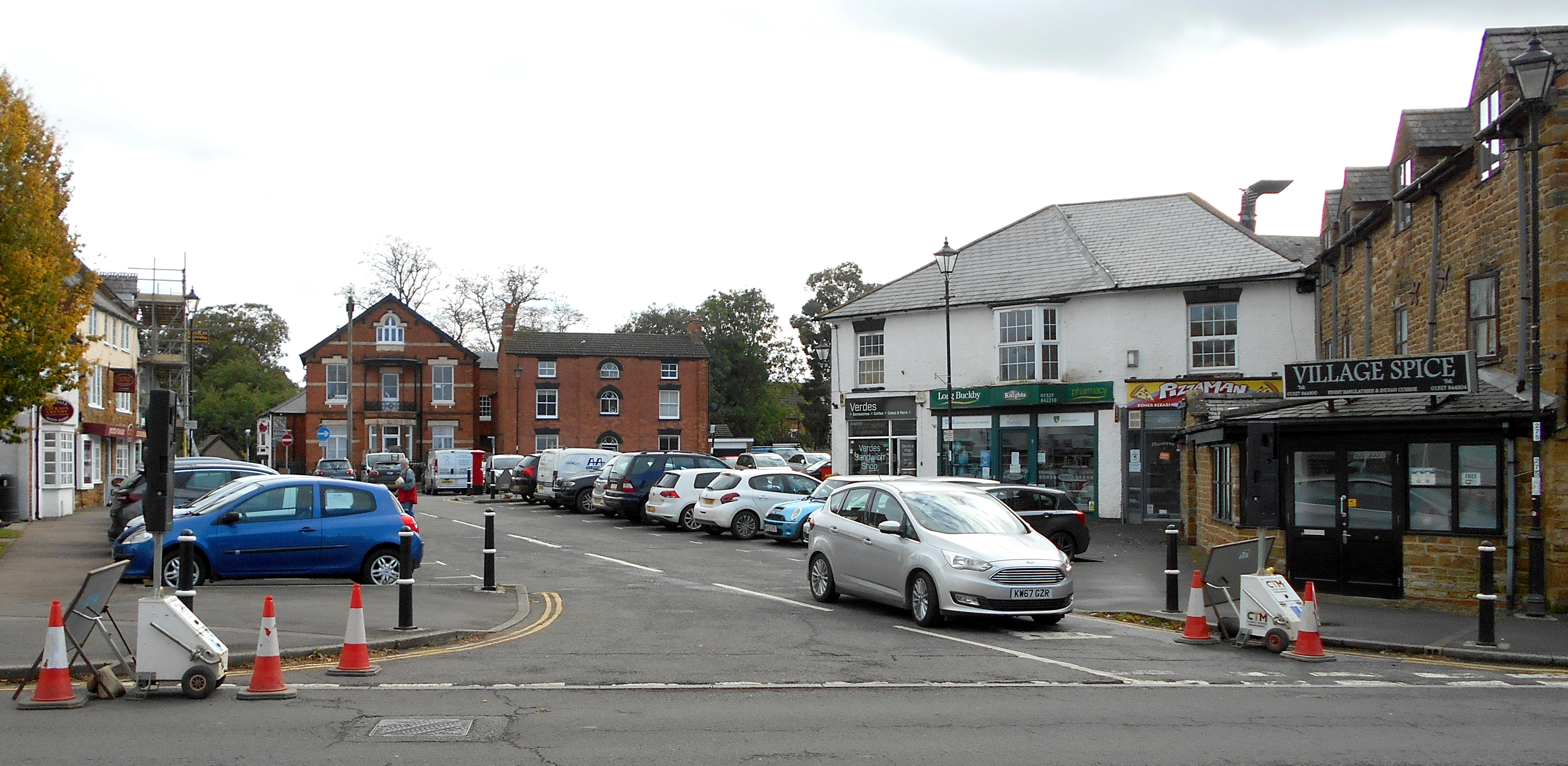
- Long Buckby Market Place

- Location within Northamptonshire
- Population: 4,511 (2021 census)
- OS grid reference: SP628673
- Civil parish: Long Buckby
- Unitary authority: West Northamptonshire
- Ceremonial county: Northamptonshire
- Region: East Midlands
- Country: England
- Sovereign state: United Kingdom
- Post town: NORTHAMPTON
- Postcode district: NN6
- Dialling code: 01327
- Police: Northamptonshire
- Fire: Northamptonshire
- Ambulance: East Midlands
- UK Parliament: Daventry

Long Buckby is a large village and civil parish in West Northamptonshire, England. In the 2021 census the parish of Long Buckby, which includes the hamlet of Long Buckby Wharf, was recorded as having a population of 4,511.

Long Buckby is a hill top village, located around 4.5 miles (7.2 km) north-east of the town of Daventry, and roughly midway between Northampton and Rugby, with each being around 9 miles (14 km) to the south-east and north-west respectively. The west of the parish has the A5 road, Grand Union Canal, West Coast Main Line railway and M1 motorway all passing through the Watford Gap, with Watford, Northamptonshire being the next village to the north.

Just south of the village is Long Buckby railway station on the Northampton Loop corollary of the West Coast Main Line.

== History ==
The origin of the name of the village is uncertain. 'Bukki's farm/settlement' or 'Bucca's farm/settlement'. Alternatively, 'billy-goat farm/settlement'.

Long Buckby has a history going back approximately 1,000 years to the Vikings when all of northern, central and eastern England came under the Danelaw. The village was recorded in Domesday Book as Buchebei and its prefix was first recorded in the Elizabethan era in reference to the length of the village.

Near the centre of the village are the remaining earthworks of a medieval castle, which was probably built by the lords of the manor, the de Quincy family, in the 12th century. The castle was likely an earth and timber construction, built by 1150 AD and occupied until some time after 1200 AD. The surviving earthworks, known locally as The Mounts, consist of an oval ring surrounded by a ditch.

The tower of the parish church of St Lawrence dates to the 12th century, with the rest of the building added later.

Long Buckby was once a thriving industrial village: In the 17th century a woollen industry was established and Long Buckby became a centre of weaving and woolcombing. After 1800 this went into decline and was replaced by a thriving shoemaking industry. This was enhanced by the arrival of the Grand Union Canal in the early 19th century, upon which Long Buckby had a busy wharf. The shoemaking industry went into gradual decline in the 20th century and had died out by 2000.

Nonconformity was a strong tradition in the village, with a chapel of the United Reform Church built here in 1707. The present building was built in 1771.

The small hamlet of Long Buckby Wharf is separate from the main village but within the parish. It is located alongside the Grand Union Canal and was once a thriving community with its own post office, church and village hall.

Since the 1960s the construction of the nearby M1 motorway has spurred expansion of the village from around 2,500 inhabitants to more than 4,000 and has caused the nature of the village to change into a residential and commuter village.

Long Buckby railway station was opened in 1881 on the Northampton Loop Line. Until the mid-1960s Long Buckby boasted its own goods-marshalling yard, which played a very significant role in the once thriving village economy, providing for the import of fuel and consumables for local business and residents as well as delivering the mail and packages to the village post office and newspapers to the village newsagents. Local agricultural produce and to a lesser extent livestock were exported from the facility.

The English comedian Stanley Unwin moved to Long Buckby in 1940 when he got a job with the BBC at the nearby Borough Hill transmitting station. He lived there until his death in 2002.

Long Buckby railway station, as the nearest stop to Althorp, was the final stop on the rail journey by the then Prince of Wales, his two sons and others following the funeral of Diana, Princess of Wales and as such it was seen on television across the world.

== Notable buildings and monument ==
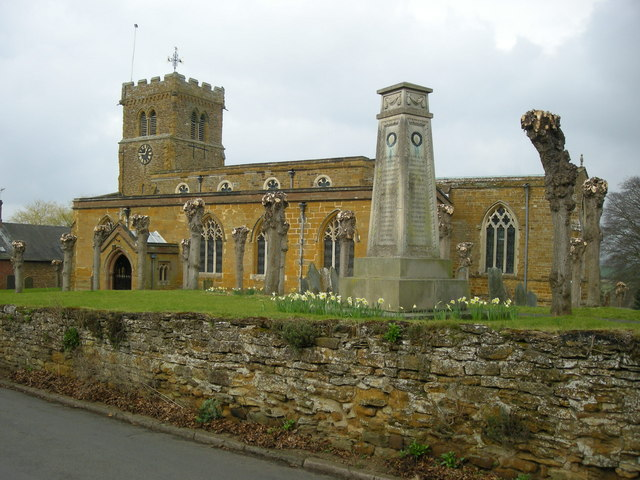
St Lawrence's Church

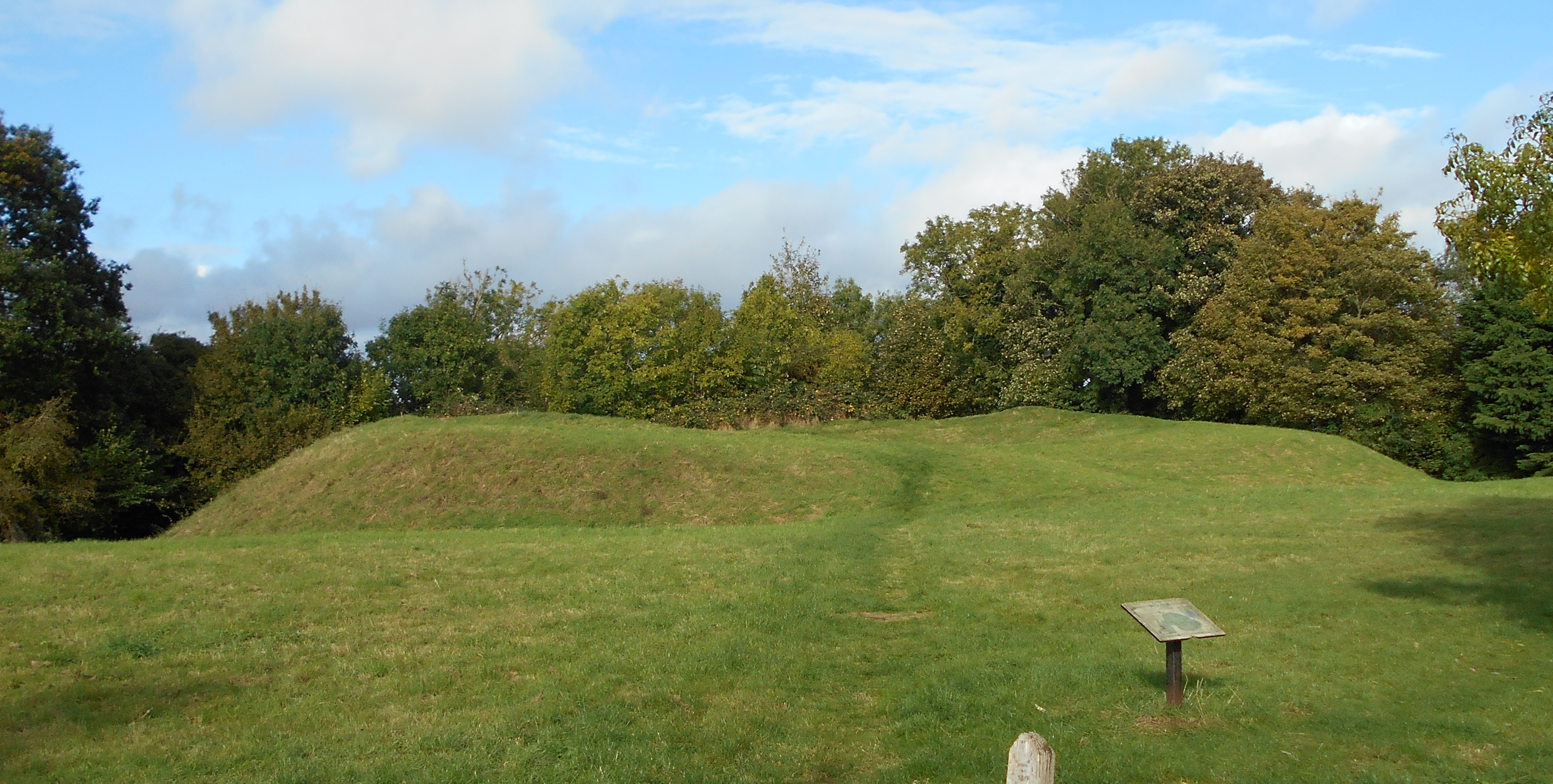
The remaining earthworks of Long Buckby Castle, known locally as The Mounts

The Historic England website contains details of 37 listed buildings in the parish of Long Buckby. All of them are Grade II apart from the following, which are Grade II*.

- St Lawrence's Church, Church Street
- Holly House, 22 High Street

There is also one scheduled monument in the parish:

- Long Buckby Castle, ringwork and bailey

== Transport ==
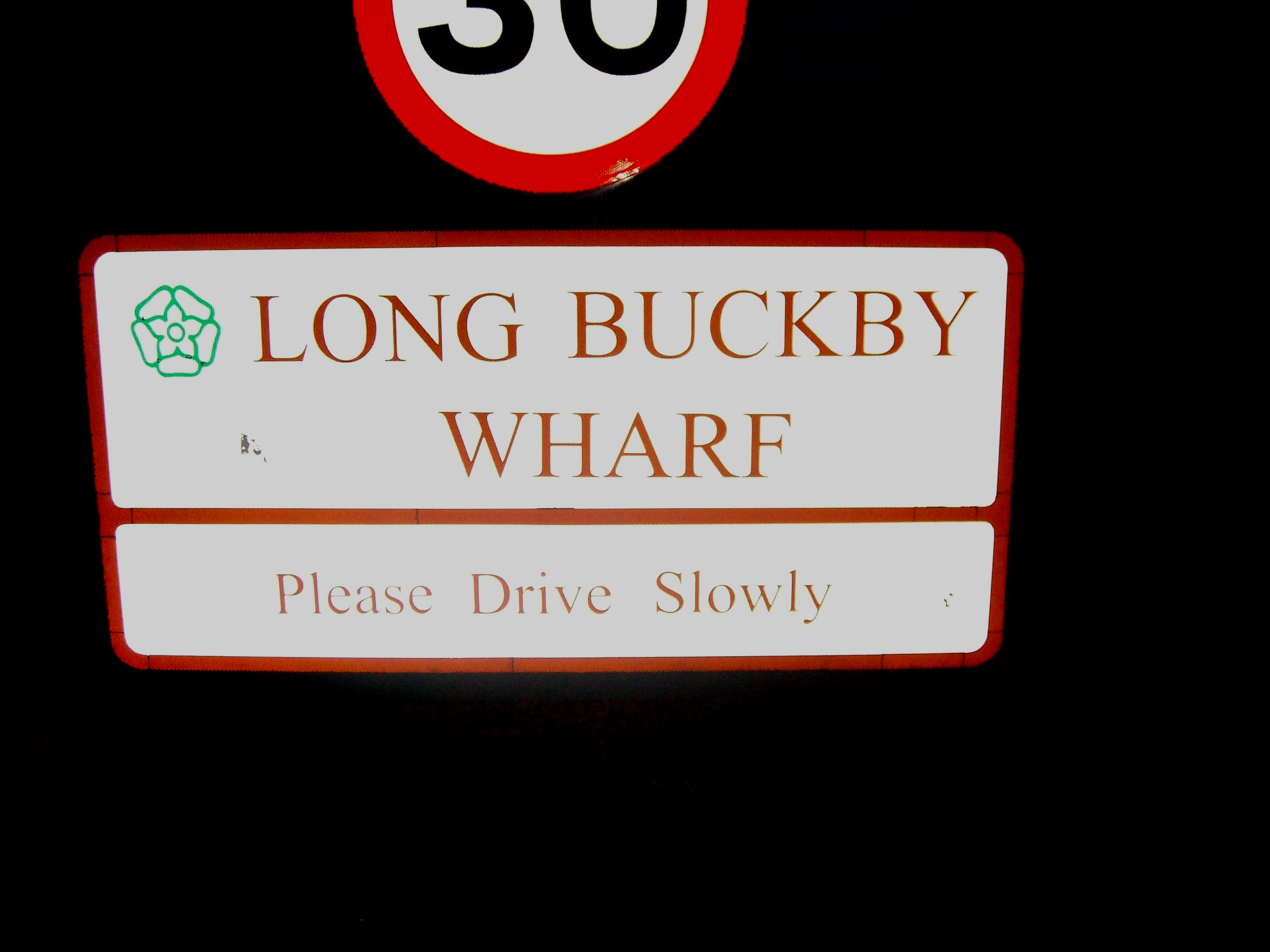
Sign outside Long Buckby Wharf

The A5 road and M1 motorway run a short distance to the west of Long Buckby. The nearest motorway junctions on the M1 are numbers 16 and 18. In addition, the A428 trunk road runs a short distance to the east of Long Buckby.

Long Buckby railway station is served by West Midlands Trains. It lies on the Northampton Loop of the West Coast Main Line running between Birmingham New Street and London Euston.

Regular local bus services connect Long Buckby to the nearby towns of Northampton, Rugby and Daventry.

== Schools ==
Long Buckby has two schools, Long Buckby Infants School for reception, Year 1 and Year 2, and Long Buckby Junior School which takes pupils from Year 3 to Year 6, leading up to the Key Stage 2 tests.

The village is within the catchment area of Guilsborough School, a secondary school which takes local pupils on to Key Stage 3 (Year 7 to Year 9), followed by Key Stage 4 for Years 10 and 11. Guilsborough School also offers a Sixth Form centre for students wishing to take AS and A2 courses.

== Sport ==
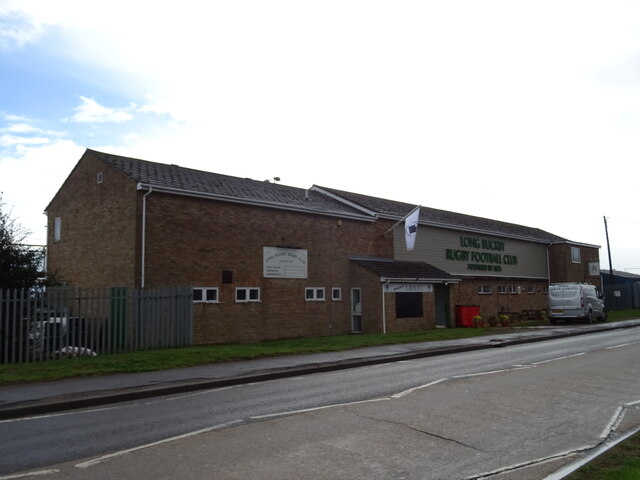
The Rugby clubhouse was constructed in 1975 at a cost of £30,000.

=== Rugby Union ===
Long Buckby Rugby Football Club, the oldest continuously operating Rugby Union club in the East Midlands region, was founded in 1875 and is located on Station Road, next to the football and cricket clubs. fielding three senior sides, a colts team and several other junior teams, the club celebrated its 150th anniversary in 2025.

The club has a licensed clubhouse which was opened for its previous major anniversary in 1975. The club's colours have historically been green and gold, though other colours have occasionally been used, navy blue has been incorporated significantly more in recent years. The club's emblem is a castle with an archway with a cross above.

=== Association Football ===
Long Buckby A.F.C. plays at Station Road. They are members of the United Counties League First Division. The club's highest achievement was reaching the 2nd round of the FA Vase in 1985–86. The club's most successful players include Gary Mills and Dan Holman. The football club on the same site as the rugby union club has its own clubhouse and a second pitch which the reserves and Sunday League sides use.

=== Tennis tournament ===
The Long Buckby Tennis Tournament is an event which started in 1907, and is played annually in mid-July on the sports ground. It is a doubles tournament with each team playing all the others in their section.

== Economy ==
Maclaren, the pushchair manufacturer founded by Owen Finlay Maclaren, was based in the village until 2000 when the company went into receivership and manufacturing went to China.

== Notable residents ==
- David Owen Norris, (born 1953) pianist, composer, academic, and broadcaster
- Stanley Unwin (1911–2002), comedian and inventor of Unwinese, lived in the village for many years and is buried in the local churchyard.
- William Wadsworth (1594–1675), likely born in Long Buckby, emigrated to America and became a founder of Hartford, Connecticut.
- Marcia Williams (1932-2019), political secretary and head of political office to, UK Labour prime minister Harold Wilson
