= Owen Finlay Maclaren =

British businessman

Owen Finlay Maclaren, MBE (26 May 1906 – 13 April 1978) was the inventor of the lightweight baby buggy with a collapsible support assembly and founder of the Maclaren company.

== Early life ==
He was born in Saffron Walden in Essex to Andrew Maclaren and Eva (née Friend). His father died in 1914. His family descended from the Clan MacLaren in Argyll. He attended Marlborough College and Blair Lodge Academy in Polmont, Falkirk. He studied at Jesus College, Cambridge, where he learnt to fly in Cambridge University Air Squadron, qualifying as a pilot in 1928.

== Design engineer ==
=== Esso ===
He first worked for Esso. Then he moved.

=== Spitfire undercarriage ===
He designed Spitfire undercarriage legs when working for Maclaren Undercarriage Company Ltd, and while living in West Drayton, Middlesex. In 1944, he retired from aeronautical design, forming the company Andrews Maclaren that manufactured aircraft components.

=== The Maclaren Drift Undercarriage ===
In 1937, he designed a system for an undercarriage that could cope with cross winds, in which the main wheels could be set to a steering angle away from straight ahead, so that an aircraft could be landed safely in a "crabbing" attitude. Tests with several aircraft types were conducted during and after World War II.

He designed the 'Maclaren Radiator' in 1943. It doubled the chances of an aircraft returning, if hit by a bullet.

=== Dunlop ===
After the war he helped to develop anti-skid (ABS) brakes (Maxaret) for the aircraft division of Dunlop in Coventry. He formed Andrews Maclaren Ltd with Bill Andrews.

=== Collapsible baby buggy ===
The former test pilot and designer of the Supermarine Spitfire undercarriage was inspired when his daughter visited from Moscow with his first grandchild (Anne Hambledon, born in 1962). His daughter had married George Hambledon of Pan Am, making many flights to London. After watching the parents struggle with the clumsy conventional pushchair, he used his knowledge of lightweight, collapsible structures to create a new generation of infant transport and inspire the design of future collapsible objects such as the Strida bicycle.

He designed his first buggy in 1964, which was built in his medieval farmhouse stables in Barby, Northamptonshire in England just south of Rugby. He applied for a patent, on 20 July 1965, for his 6lb B01 prototype with lightweight aluminium tubes receiving Patent No. 1,154,362. On 18 July 1966 he filed for an American patent, receiving Patent No. 3,390,893A.

He then founded his company, the Maclaren Company, in 1965.

Only after this design would aluminium tubes be used in other household equipment. The buggy went on sale in 1967, and roughly a thousand of them were manufactured that year. In 1976 that number rose to 600,000 buggies produced a year.

He also designed the 'Gadabout folding chair' which was produced from 1961, and was commissioned by the Ministry of Health to design a larger folding buggy for larger children with disabilities called the 'Buggy Major' this buggy was designed on square tubes instead of the usual round tubes like the 'Baby Buggy', being produced around 1970.

Today the modern version of the 'Baby Buggy' are sold in over 50 countries under the Maclaren brand based in Long Buckby.

== Personal life ==
He was married to Marie Blacklock, and they had a son (who married on 15 June 1963, then moved to Hatfield Peverel in Essex, having a son in March 1965 and a daughter in April 1968) and daughter (1937–90). His grand-daughter, Anne Hambledon, for whom the baby-buggy was designed, now lives in Vermont.

His eldest brother Bruce (who also attended the University of Cambridge) married the granddaughter of Charles George Arbuthnot, and also the niece of General Sir Alexander Cobbe VC.

In January 1978, Queen Elizabeth II awarded him with an MBE in the New Year's Honours List.
