= Maclaren =

English baby buggy and pram manufacturer

- Company type: Private company
- Founded: 1967 by Owen Finlay Maclaren
- Headquarters: Long Buckby, England
- Products: baby buggies, prams, carriers
- Website: maclaren.global

Maclaren is a manufacturer of baby buggies, prams and carriers based in England.

== Product range ==
Prams based around Owen Maclaren's original design are sold in over 50 countries under the Maclaren brand. These include the Maclaren Volo, Globetrotter, Triumph, Quest, Techno XT, and Techno XLR.

== Financial difficulties ==
In September 2000, the company went into receivership with large debts and was subsequently acquired by a family based in Monaco and Switzerland. The factory in Long Buckby closed in October 2000, and production was moved to Shenzhen, China.

On 29 December 2011, the U.S. unit of Maclaren filed for Chapter 7 Liquidation, but the company is considered one of the biggest players in this industry.

In January 2024, Maclaren Global is no longer in business.

In October 2024, Inglesina Baby acquired Maclaren.

== Recall of prams ==
In November 2009, Maclaren USA voluntarily recalled its entire line of prams sold in the U.S. and produced from 1999 to 2009, comprising about one million units, citing 12 reported fingertip amputations in its hinges. The company provided free hinge covers for all consumers and advised against using the buggies until the hinge covers were installed. In May 2011, the company re-announced the recall after additional injuries had been reported.
