= Silver Cross (company) =

British nursery brand

Silver Cross Ltd
- Founded: 1877
- Headquarters: Skipton, North Yorkshire, United Kingdom
- Parent: Fosun International
- Website: silvercrossbaby.com

Silver Cross is an English private limited company and manufacturer of baby transport and other baby-related products, founded in 1877. Based in Skipton, North Yorkshire, United Kingdom, Silver Cross sells baby prams (perambulators, a type of baby transport) and pushchairs. Its parent company, the Chinese conglomerate Fosun International, owns 87.2 percent of the equity.

== History ==
=== Founding ===
William Wilson founded the company in 1877 in Hunslet, Leeds. Wilson's prams used a spring system and a reversible hood, which he produced in a factory on Silver Cross Street, Leeds. In 1897, Wilson opened a factory on Whitehouse Street in Leeds. Thereafter, Wilson registered more than 30 patents for pram design. After receiving a Royal Warrant for baby carriage production, William Wilson died at age 58. Ownership passed to his three sons: James, Irwin, and Alfred.

=== 20th century ===
In the 1920s and 1930s, the Wilson brothers supplied a Silver Cross baby carriage to George VI and Queen Elizabeth The Queen Mother. By 1936, Silver Cross had moved to a larger factory in Guiseley.

In the 1940s and 1950s, Silver Cross developed new techniques for pram production. Plywood bodies were replaced with aluminum, and new rubber die presses, spot-welding machines, and others were installed at the Silver Cross Works. Posters of the time portrayed Silver Cross prams alongside Rolls-Royce cars, leading to the unofficial title of "the Rolls-Royce of Prams". Silver Cross prams came to be seen as old-fashioned.

During the 1990s the firm struggled against competitors and the workforce, which had been 500 at its peak dwindled to 250 by 1997, and then down further to around 100 by 1999.

Despite an attempted relaunch in 1998, at a cost of £4 million, Silver Cross went into receivership in May 1999. After a large number of expressions of interest in purchasing the company, Silver Cross was sold to a group of Oxfordshire-based investors, led by Graham Hazell, who retained the 30 remaining staff and production facilities in Guiseley.

=== 21st century ===
Graham Hazell's efforts to save the company were followed for an episode of the BBC's Trouble at the Top series, broadcast in 2001, but by then the firm had already been sold after only 13 months and a further investment of £3 million, despite a building up of the company and a doubling of the workforce. The buyer was Bolton-based Design Company Holdings Ltd.

In 2002, financial irregularities in respect of the stock held by Design Company (Manchester) Ltd saw Silver Cross once again collapse into receivership, putting 125 jobs in Guiseley a further 86 jobs at Kearsley in jeopardy. The company was sold to Alan Halsall for £500,000. The factory in Guiseley closed and the firm relocated to Skipton. While Halsall kept the older designs, most of the company's sales came from more modern designs, such as car seats. Additionally, Halsall wanted Silver Cross to partner with complementary British manufacturers, such as furniture makers and toy makers. Halsall also focused on expanding the company into international markets, particularly Asian territories, including China, Hong Kong, South Korea, Malaysia, and Singapore.

In 2013, Silver Cross entered into a partnership with classic British automotive brand Aston Martin to produce a special edition of the Surf pram and pushchair.

On July 20, 2015, Fosun International announced it had purchased the company from Halsall. As of 2017, Fosun owned 87.23% of the company.

In October 2016, the company announced their expansion into the United States via ABC Expo, a trade show for children's products.

== Products ==
Silver Cross's coach-built prams have a hard body, C-spring suspension, spoked wheels, and a folding hood. This method of pram construction was developed by William Wilson, who marketed it and registered numerous patents for perambulator design.
