= F. A. Whitney Carriage Company =

The F. A. Whitney Carriage Company in Leominster, Massachusetts is named after Francis Austin Whitney, who founded the company in 1858 with his cousin Francis Wolfe Whitney. They were the first manufacturers of baby carriages in America.

== Sources ==
- Blair, Cynthia, 1848: Baby Carriage Invented, retrieved 2007-08-14
- Monoosnoc Brook Greenway Project, retrieved 2007-08-14
- F. A. Whitney Carriage Company, retrieved 2007-08-14
- Carriage Spring patent # 157,952, retrieved 2007-08-14
- Carriages made of wicker didn't stand the test of time, San Diego Union-Tribune, May 1, 2005, retrieved 2007-08-14
