= Valentin Vodev =

Austrian/Bulgarian industrial designer (born 1978)

Valentin Vodev (born 1978) is an Austrian-Bulgarian industrial designer. He creates design solutions for consumer goods with a focus on urban mobility products.

== Life ==
Valentin Vodev was born in 1978 in Sofia, Bulgaria, to painter Maria Duhteva and opera singer Jordan Vodev. In 1998 he moved to Vienna and studied Industrial Design at the University of Applied Arts. After graduating, he completed a master's degree in Design Products at the Royal College of Art in London. Vodev designed products for international clients, amongst others, in the area of transportation, furniture, interiors, lighting designs and other consumer goods. In 2013 he partnered with Valerie Wolff to found the company VELLO, which specializes in the development of bicycles and other mobility products.

== Works ==
Vodev collaborated with the industrial designer and architect Ron Arad and the designer Sebastian Conran. In 2011 and 2013 he curated the Sofia Design Week and in 2014 he was part of the Creative Team at the international design festival One Design Week.

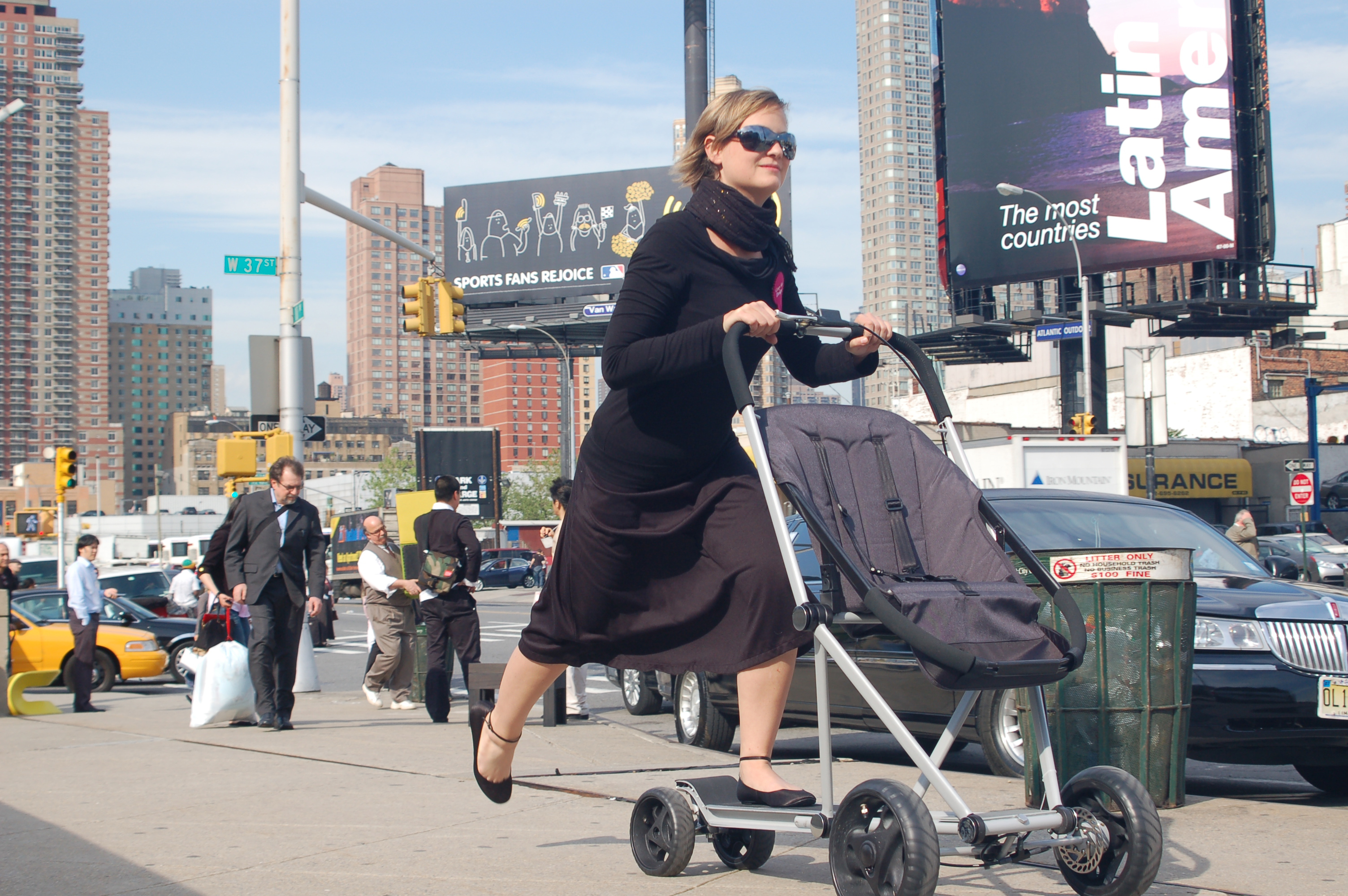
Roller Buggy

One of his first internationally renowned products was the Roller Buggy, a stroller that can be transformed into a kick scooter. Other mobility products include the Pullchair, a baby carriage that fits into a laptop case, the Biquattro, an electric bike that can be transformed into a tricycle with a loading surface and the Vienna Bike, a compact and foldable tricycle. The Vienna Bike, launched at London's eco-rally in 2011, was chosen by the European Commission to represent Austria in one of 27 ecological success stories and published in the book 100 Best Bikes by Zahid Sardar.

In cooperation with Lohner, Vodev designed the electric scooter LEA which was showcased at the Vienna Design Week in 2013 and the London Design Festival 2015, by reinterpreting the design of a scooter model from the 1950s. In 2015 his design product VELLO bike, an urban bicycle with a patented magnetic folding mechanism, was introduced into the market.

Vodev is a three-time winner of the International Bicycle Design Award and was the recipient of the Red Dot Concept Design Award in the category mobility in 2009. For the VELLO bike, he won the Red Dot: Best of the Best 2015, the 2017 European Product Design Award, the Good Design Award 2017 and the Austrian National Design Prize 2019 (Staatspreis Design).

Vodev's design products were exhibited at design shows and fairs such as Salone del Mobile in Milan, London Design Festival, ICFF in New York, 100% Design in London and Tokyo and the Vienna Design Week.
