= Travel cot =

Foldable bed for use by a baby or young child

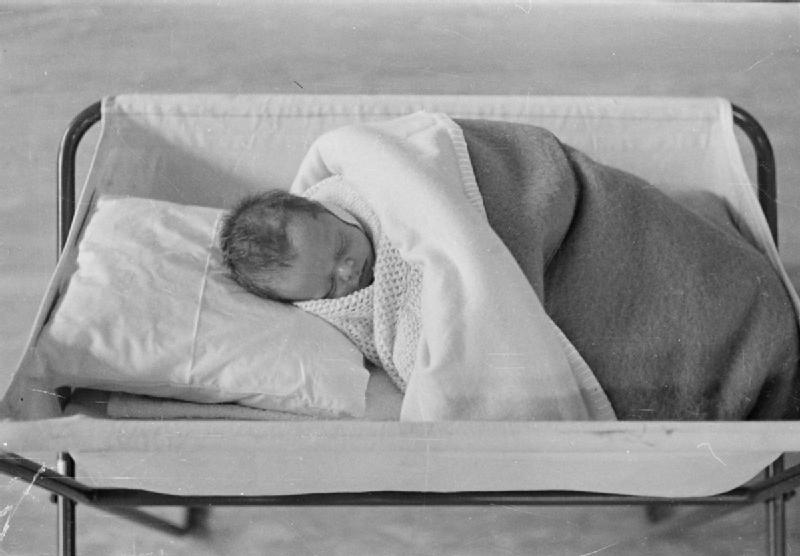
Portable baby bed (England, 1940)

A travel cot is a bed for use by a baby or young child that collapses or folds into a bag for easy carriage. Travel cots are typically much lighter than a standard cot, with soft sides to provide comfort to the baby when sleeping.

== Benefits ==
The United Kingdom Department of Health's guide Reducing the Risk Of Cot Death states that babies should always sleep by themselves, and are much safer in their own cot.

The Foundation for the Study of Infant Deaths states that it is preferable that each new baby has his or her own new mattress to avoid the risk of infection spreading between children which has been a contributing factor in some cases of SIDS.

In addition to the health benefits, a travel cot can also provide benefits to the child. Regular use of a travel cot means that a baby will become used to a sleeping environment outside the usual cot which means that they are more likely to go to sleep quicker when they are travelling and sleep for longer and more soundly when they have gone to sleep.

If using a bassinet or pop-up travel cot, the travel cot can eliminate the need to buy a separate Moses basket for the baby. Such a travel cot can be used in the first few months of a baby's life either in any part of the house so that parents can closely monitor their new born baby and can place their baby in the cot without straining to the bottom of the back - which can cause harm to a new mothers recovering body.

== Types ==
1. Standard travel cot: This is the usual type of travel cot with collapsible frame and removable mattress. It usually has a rectangular shape, but different styles are now being developed. This can be used as a travel cot and a playpen and is suitable for babies from birth until 6.5 kg (approximately 3 years old). Though a Standard travel cot is usually quite cumbersome to carry, Lightweight travel cots have now been designed ideal for camping, hiking or taking on airplanes when weight is at a premium.
2. Pop-up travel cot: this is a much smaller version of the travel cot which is suitable from birth until the baby can support themselves on their hands and knees. A pop-up travel cot is constructed in the same manner as a pop up tent which immediately 'pops up' when it is removed from its bag and is folded down to a compact size about the size of a large shopping bag. A pop-up travel cot is easier to construct and is more portable as it is lighter and more flexible than other models, but is only suitable for very young babies.
3. Bassinet travel cot: A bassinet travel cot is a standard travel cot with a bassinet included for a smaller baby. Much like the pop-up travel cot, the bassinet is smaller and softer, and is designed for new babies, however when the baby can support himself on his hands and feet, parents can remove the bassinet and use the travel cot as they would a standard travel cot, without having to buy a new travel cot. Bassinet travel cots can come with added extras including a vibrating mattress, lights and music, which are intended to support the baby in its efforts to sleep.
