= Holy Cross Church, Daventry =

Holy Cross Church
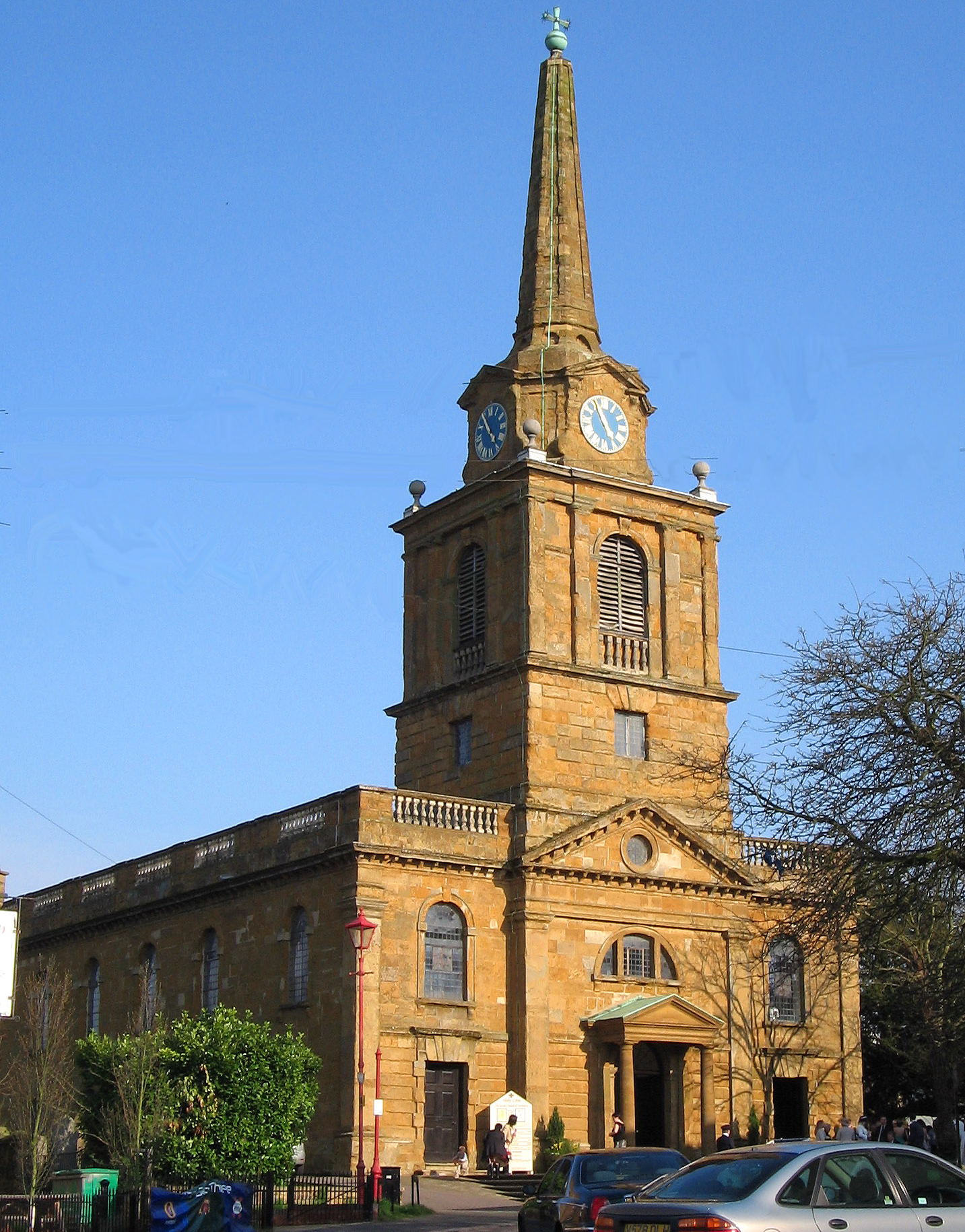
- Holy Cross Church, Daventry
- Holy Cross Church
- 52.258264°N 1.159160°W
- Location: Church Walk, Daventry, Northamptonshire, NN11 4BL
- Country: England
- Denomination: Church of England
- Website: www.holycrosschurchdaventry.org.uk/welcome.htm

History
- Status: Active

Architecture
- Functional status: Parish church
- Heritage designation: Grade I listed
- Years built: 1752–1758

Administration
- Province: Canterbury
- Diocese: Peterborough

The Church of Holy Cross is the grade I listed parish church of Daventry in Northamptonshire, England. Holy Cross is the only 18th-century town church in Northamptonshire.

== History ==
Little is known about the original church at the site, but it was probably there by the time of the Norman Conquest in 1066. In around 1108, a small Cluniac priory was founded at Daventry, alongside the parish church. The priory was closed in 1526 by Cardinal Wolsey who granted its assets to Christ Church, Oxford.

The present church was built between 1752 and 1758 by William Hiorne and his brother David, who were architects and builders based in Warwick. It was built at a cost of £3,468 (equivalent to £540,000 in 2025) raised by public subscription, to replace the previous church at the site which had decayed to the point where it was no longer safe. The design of the church was said to have been modelled on St Giles in the Fields in London.

It has been the only Church of England church in the town, except when there was a daughter church of St James, a Commissioners' church built in 1839, by architect Hugh Smith, and stood on the east side of St James Street. It was demolished in 1962.

== Architecture ==
It is constructed of the local ironstone. The western elevation is broad with large pilasters at the angles and the angles of the centre bay. The entrance porch was added in 1951. The tower rises from the centre bay and is square ending with an obelisk spire rising above. Inside, the church has three wooden galleried aisles, to the north, south and west elevations. The pulpit is decorated with marquetry and fretwork and has a staircase with twisted balusters. Above the altar at the eastern elevation is a three-bayed Venetian stained glass window. There is heraldic glass in the two upper west windows. There are C18 and C19 grey and white marble wall monuments in the chancel, finely carved gallery monument of 1707, 1800 gallery monument by Cox, and 1741 by B Palmer.

The Heritage at Risk Register for 2012 states that "Holy Cross is clearly well cared for and well maintained. However, some high level ironstone blocks and limestone balusters have weathered badly. Parapet and balustrade masonry is of particular concern. Some masonry fragments have already fallen. A grant was offered in December 2011" .. and, with locally raised funds and a large anonymous donation, work was carried out between May and October 2013.

== The bells ==
Some time after 1550 a new Gothic church was erected, and in 1700 Bridges records the inscriptions of the five bells then hanging in the tower, some of which bore the name of the Watts foundry of Leicester. They are also shown by North in his Church Bells of Northamptonshire (1877).

In 1738, these five, together with three other bells formerly hanging in the tower of Catesby Priory, were recast by Thomas Eayre, of Kettering, into a fine ring of eight with a 16+ cwt. tenor. They were rehung in the new tower in 1754, and with the exception of the 6th, which was recast by Joseph Eayre at St. Neots in 1764, they survived intact until 1908, when the tenor, having become badly cracked, was recast with added metal by John Taylor & Co. In 1915 the 7th fell in two pieces during service ringing one Sunday and this, too, was recast at Loughborough. By 1938 the bells were badly in need of rehanging, and the old oak frame was strengthened and the bells hung on cast iron headstocks and ball-bearings. Another bell, the 3rd, became cracked in 1951 and was recast.

Inspection by Frederick Sharpe in 1960 and later by Taylors revealed that the frame was once again moving considerably, and the bells were consequently not always easy to ring—particularly the tenor. The cause was found to be the ends of the massive supporting beams which had rotted in the walls. The enthusiasm of the local ringers led to the decision to install a frame for ten and to add two new trebles; at the same time it was thought advisable to recast the old treble, 2nd and 4th—the ringers undertaking to pay for two of them. The dedication of the newly restored bells coincided with the visit of the Central Council of Church Bell Ringers to Northampton in 1965.

== Gallery ==
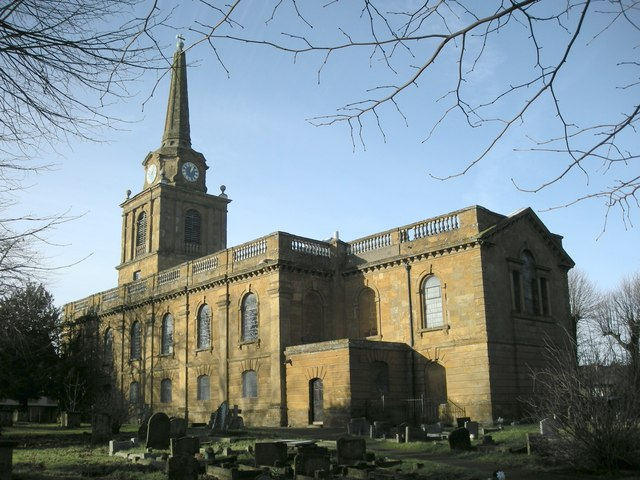
Rear view

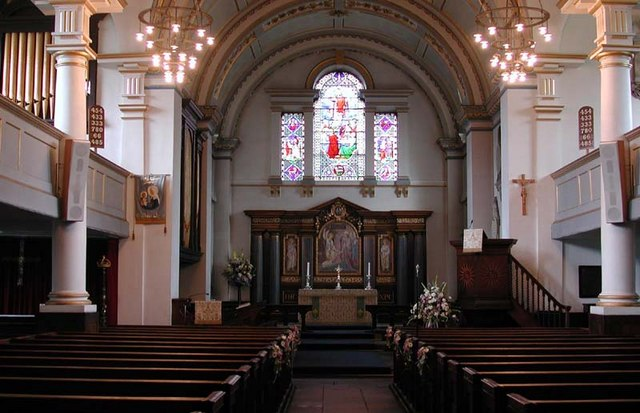
Interior

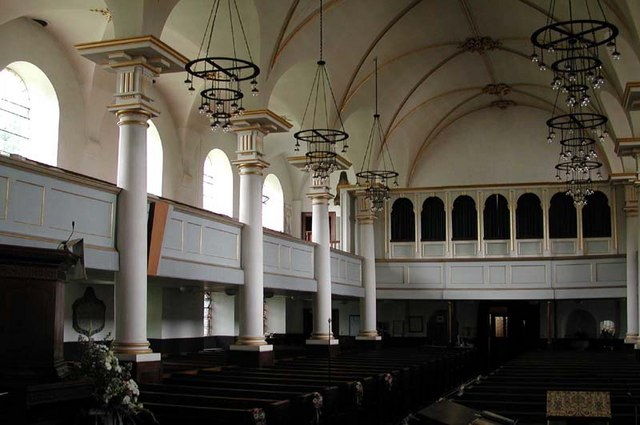
Interior

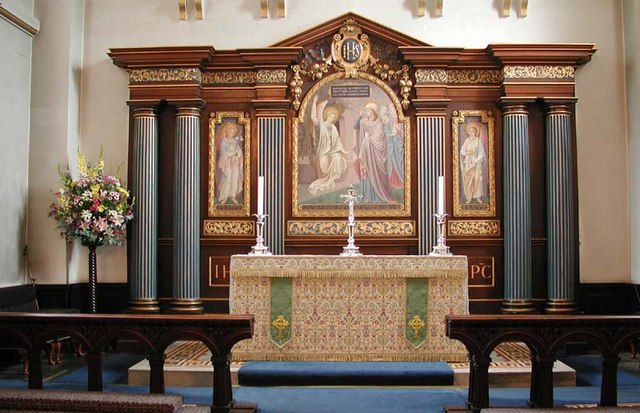
High Altar
