= Weedon railway station =

Disused railway station in Northamptonshire

Coordinates: 52.2344°N 1.0811°W

Weedon
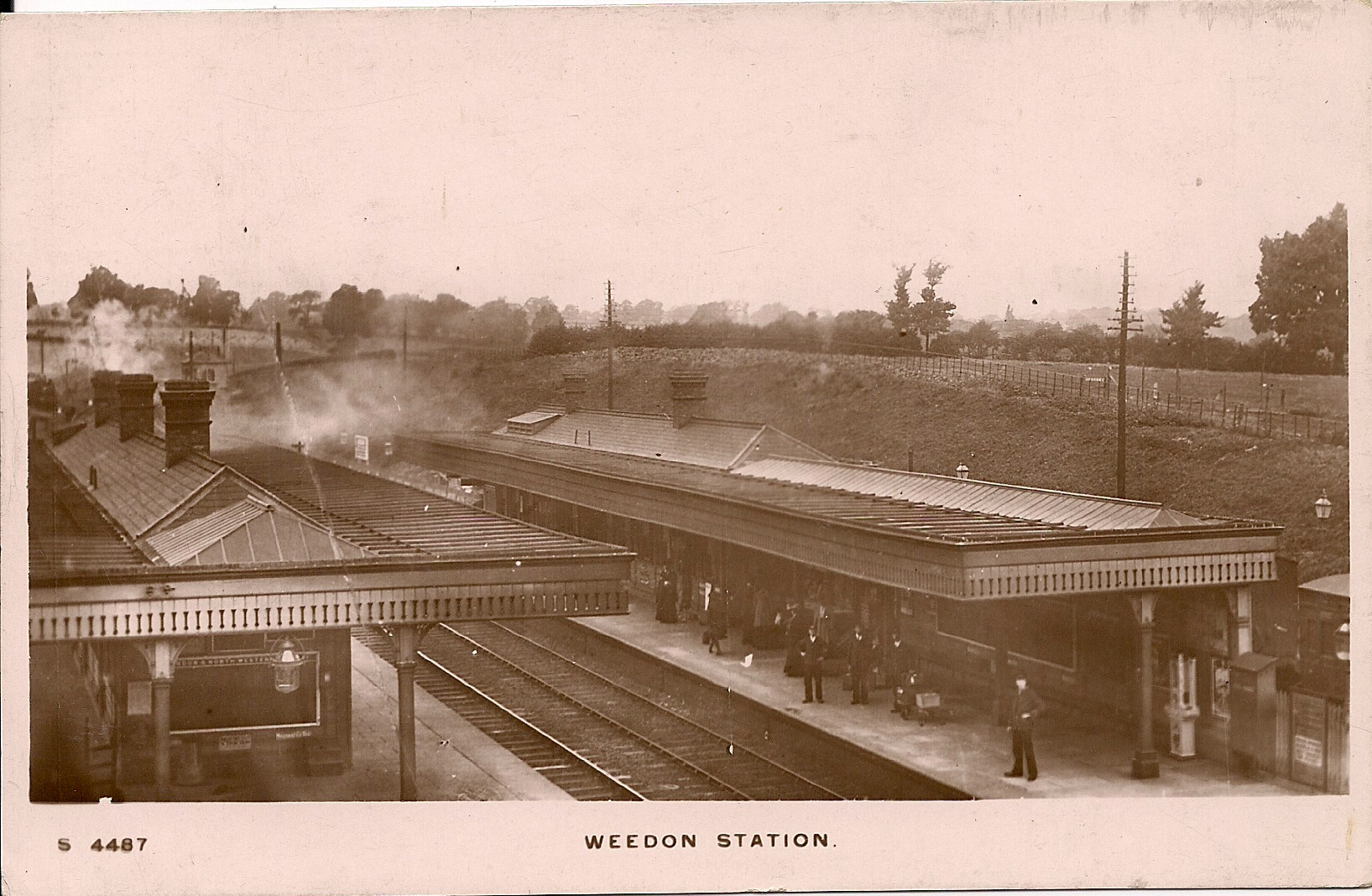
- Weedon station in the 1900s

General information
- Location: Weedon Bec, West Northamptonshire; England
- Platforms: 3 (2 side, 1 bay)

Other information
- Status: Demolished

History
- Original company: London and Birmingham Railway
- Pre-grouping: London and North Western Railway
- Post-grouping: London, Midland and Scottish Railway

Key dates
- 17 September 1838: Opened
- 19 Feb. 1888: resited
- 15 September 1958: Closed
Location

Weedon railway station was located to the north of Weedon Bec in Northamptonshire, England on the West Coast Main Line. It was a junction station, being the starting point of the Weedon to Leamington Spa branch line, with one bay platform dedicated for terminating branch line trains.

== History ==
The station also housed a busy goods depot which was attacked by German aircraft during World War II.

The station closed for passengers on 15 September 1958, concurrent with closure of the branch to Leamington Spa; it was demolished soon afterwards.

=== Accidents and incidents ===
Two serious derailments occurred south of the station in 1915 and 1951, killing 10 and 15 people respectively.

== Future ==
Transport advocacy group Sustainable Transport Midlands is campaigning for a new parkway station to be built in Weedon to serve Daventry. In an interview with BBC News, Councillor Phil Larratt, West Northamptonshire Council cabinet member for Transport said 'West Northamptonshire Council supported new stations and a new facility at Weedon could "serve all the villages and communities between Daventry, Northampton and Towcester"'

At present, the nearest operational station to Daventry and Weedon is Long Buckby.

== Routes ==
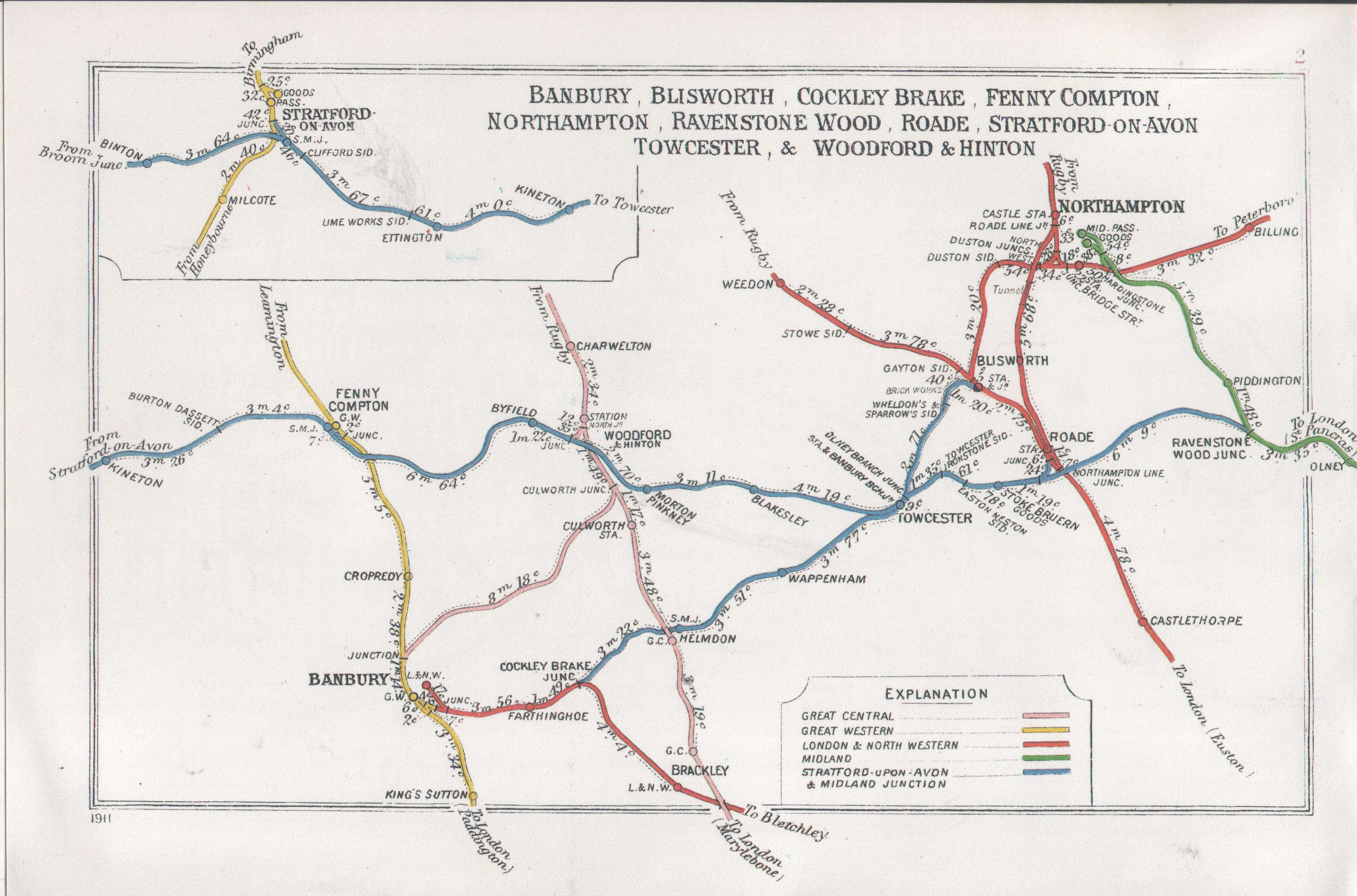
A 1911 Railway Clearing House map of railways in the vicinity of Weedon (upper middle, in red)

Preceding station	Disused railways	Following station
Welton; Line open, station closed	West Coast Main Line	Blisworth; Line open, station closed
Daventry; Line and station closed	Weedon to Leamington Spa line	Terminus
