= Daventry =

Market town and civil parish in Northamptonshire, England

Coordinates: 52°15′28″N 01°09′46″W

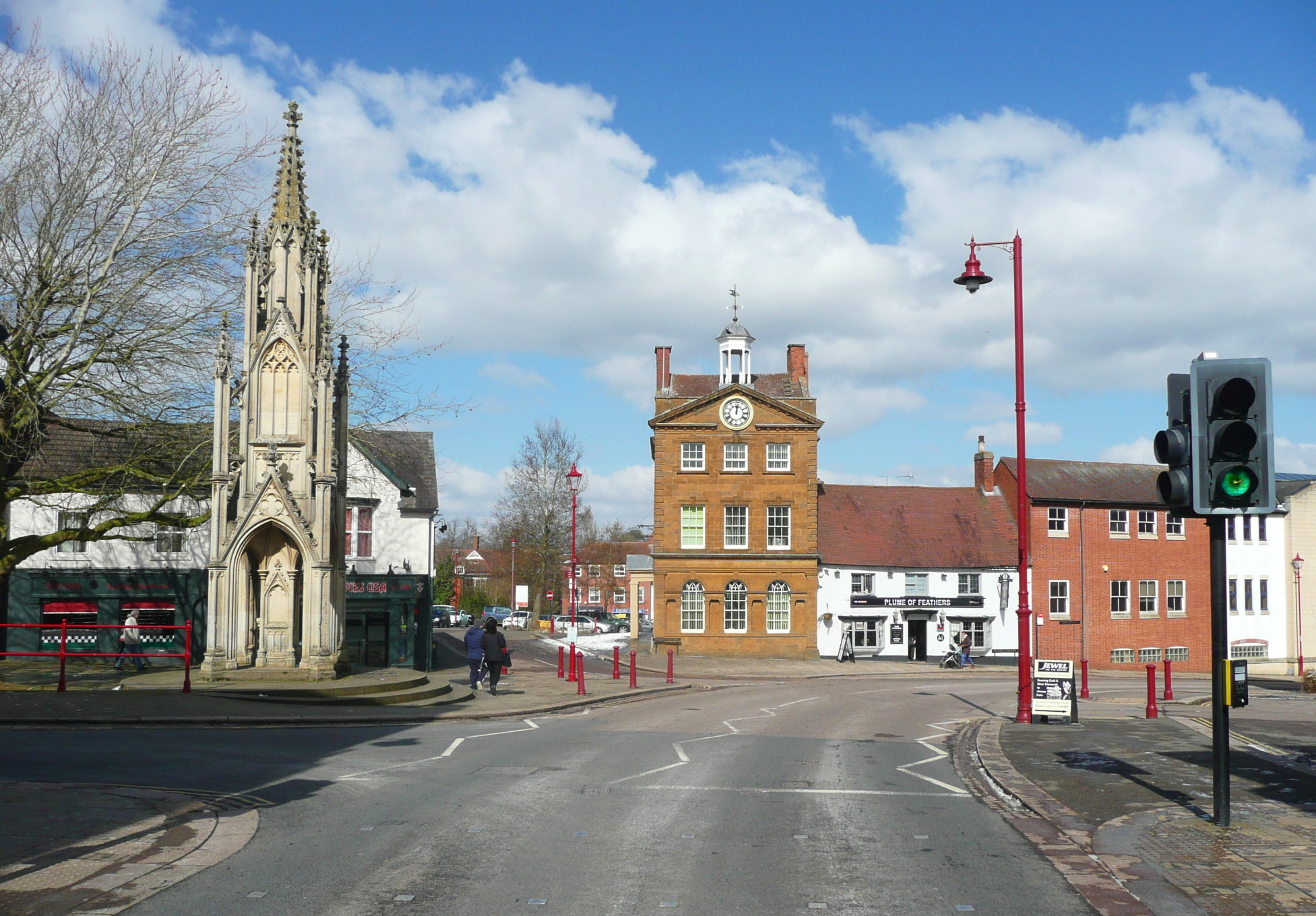
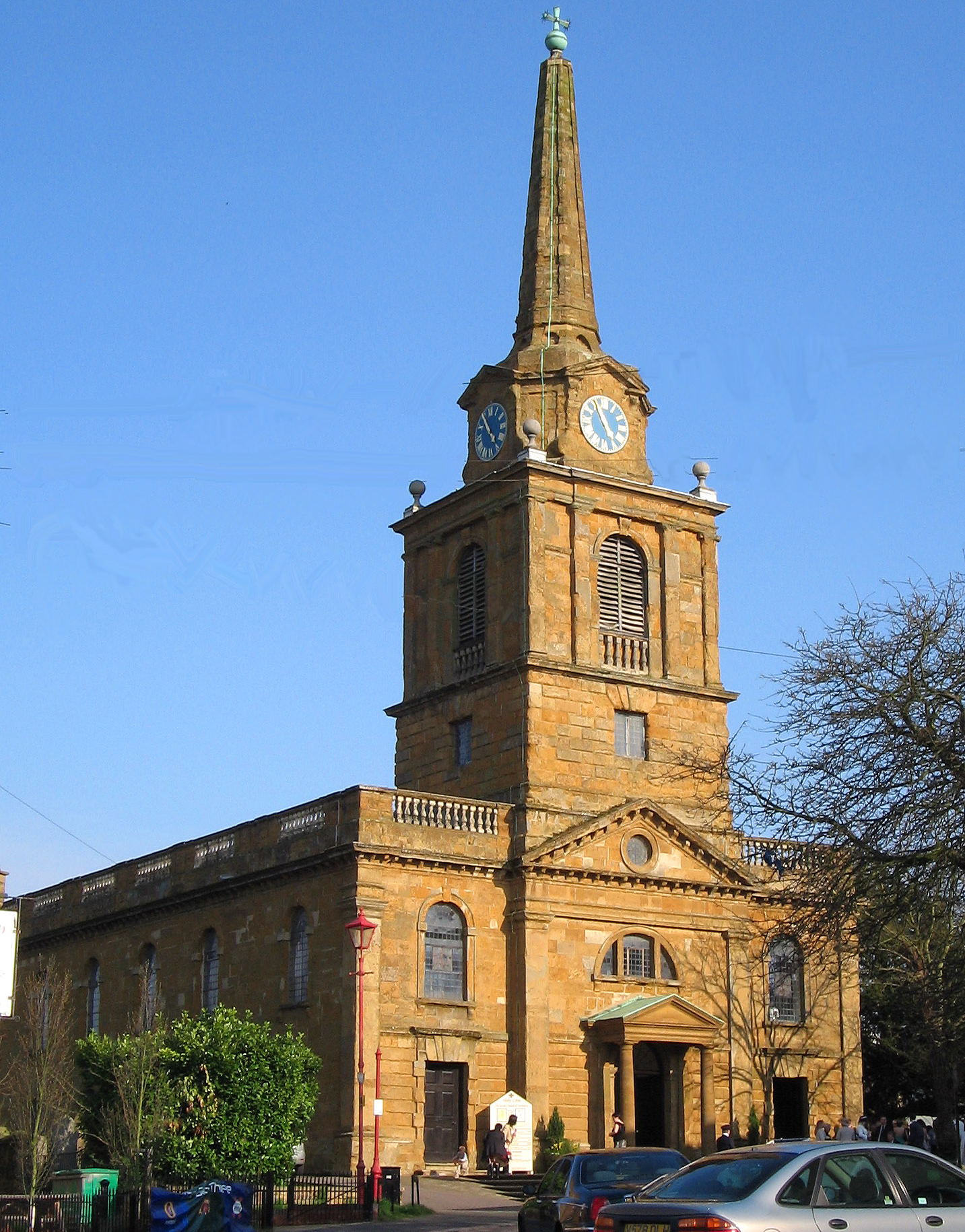
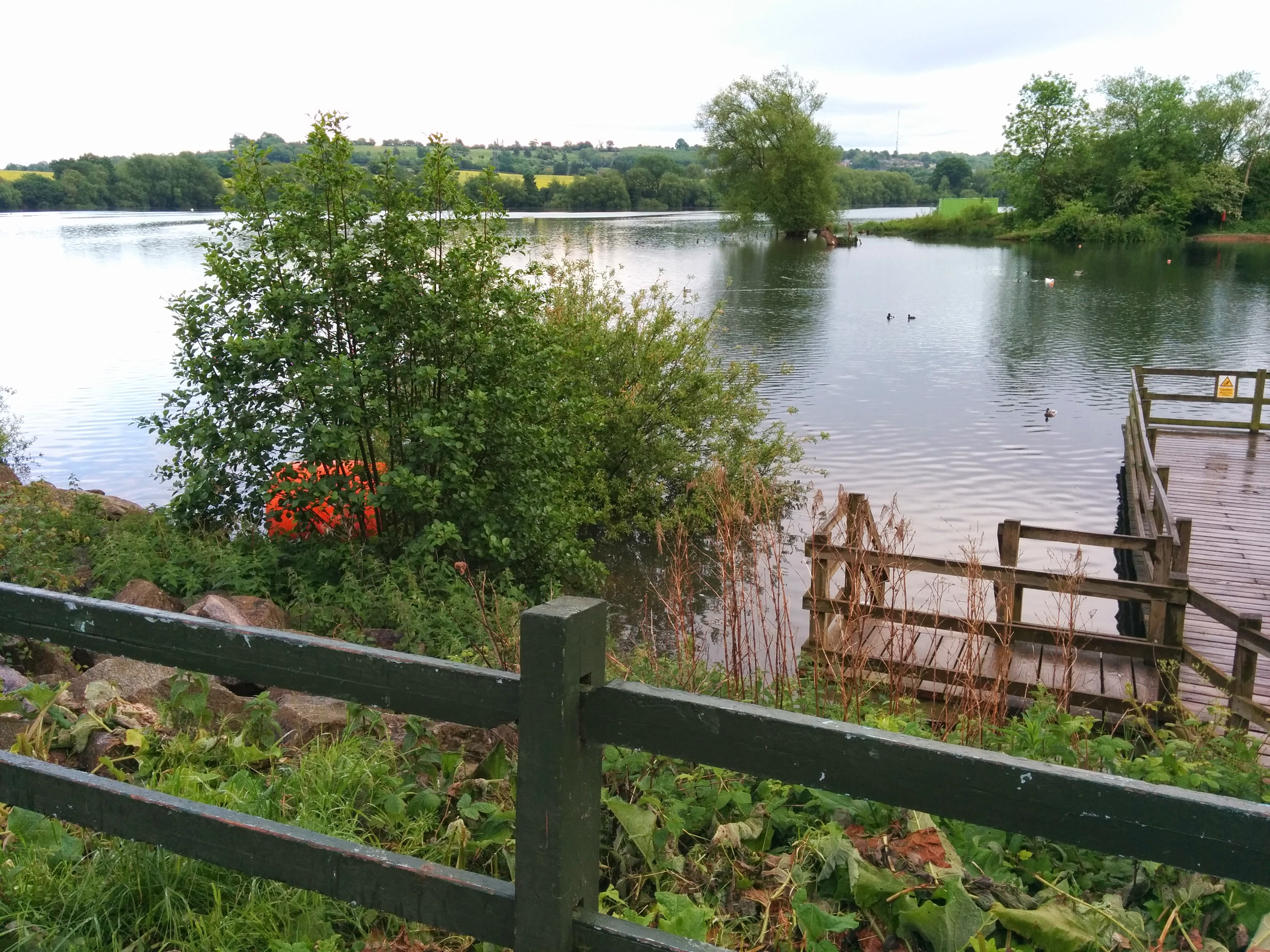
- From left to right: Top: New Street, looking towards Market Square; Bottom: Holy Cross Church & Daventry Country Park

- Location within Northamptonshire
- Population: 28,123 (2021 Census)
- OS grid reference: SP5762
- Civil parish: Daventry
- Unitary authority: West Northamptonshire
- Ceremonial county: Northamptonshire
- Region: East Midlands
- Country: England
- Sovereign state: United Kingdom
- Post town: DAVENTRY
- Postcode district: NN11
- Dialling code: 01327
- Police: Northamptonshire
- Fire: Northamptonshire
- Ambulance: East Midlands
- UK Parliament: Daventry

Daventry (/ˈdævəntri/ DAV-ən-tree, historically /ˈdeɪntri/ DAYN-tree) is a market town and civil parish in West Northamptonshire, England, close to Northamptonshire's border with Warwickshire. At the 2021 Census, Daventry had a population of 28,123, making it the sixth-largest town in Northamptonshire.

== Geography ==
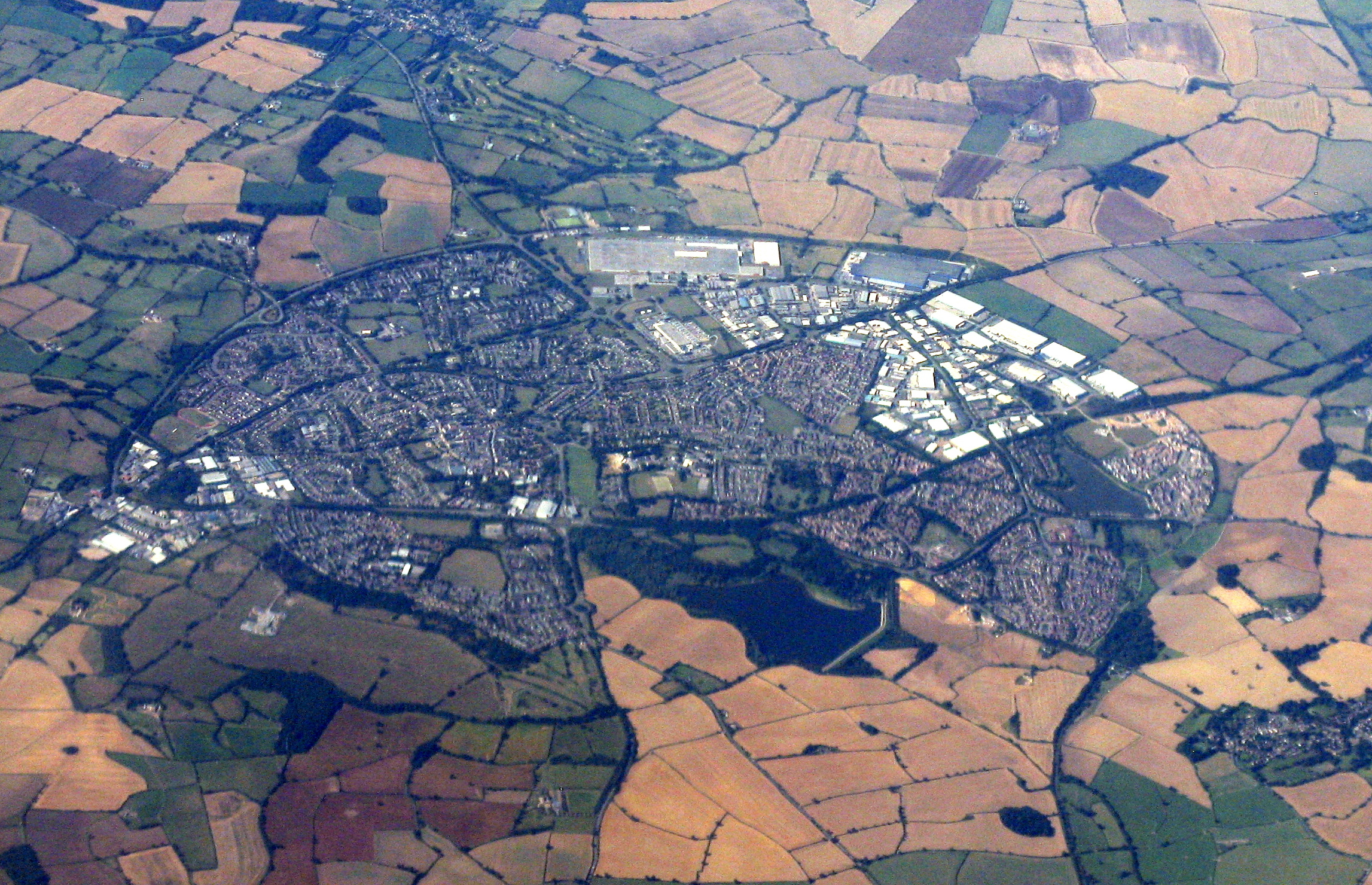
Aerial photograph of Daventry, taken from the east

The town is located 75 mi (120 km) north-north-west of London via the M1 motorway, 14 mi (23 km) west of Northampton, 10 1/4 mi (16.5 km) south-east of Rugby and 15 3/4 mi (25.5 km) north-north-east of Banbury.

Other nearby places include Southam, Coventry and the villages of Ashby St Ledgers, Badby, Barby, Braunston, Byfield, Charwelton, Dodford, Dunchurch, Everdon, Fawsley, Hellidon, Kilsby, Long Buckby, Newnham, Norton, Staverton, Welton, Weedon and Woodford Halse. The town is twinned with Westerburg, Germany.

The town lies at around 110–210 m (360–690 ft) above sea level. To the north and west, the land is generally lower than the town. Daventry sits on the watershed of the River Leam which flows to Leamington Spa, Warwick and the west of England and the River Nene which flows east. There is no river in the town; the largest gatherings of water are two reservoirs made to supply the canal that swings from Watford Gap into the West Midlands through the 2,042 yd-long (1,867 m) Braunston Tunnel around the north of the town. To the north-west is Drayton Reservoir and to the north-east is the Daventry Reservoir and country park.

Watford Gap is about 4 mi (6 km) north-east of the town; through this gap pass the A5 (Watling Street Roman road), the Grand Union Canal, West Coast Main Line, the Northampton Loop Line and most recently the M1 motorway.

Daventry has several housing estates, which include Drayton, Middlemore Farm, Lang Farm, Ashby Fields, Royal Oak, Timken, Stefen Hill, The Grange, The Southbrook, The Headlands and most recently Monksmoor Park and Malabar.

== Characteristics ==
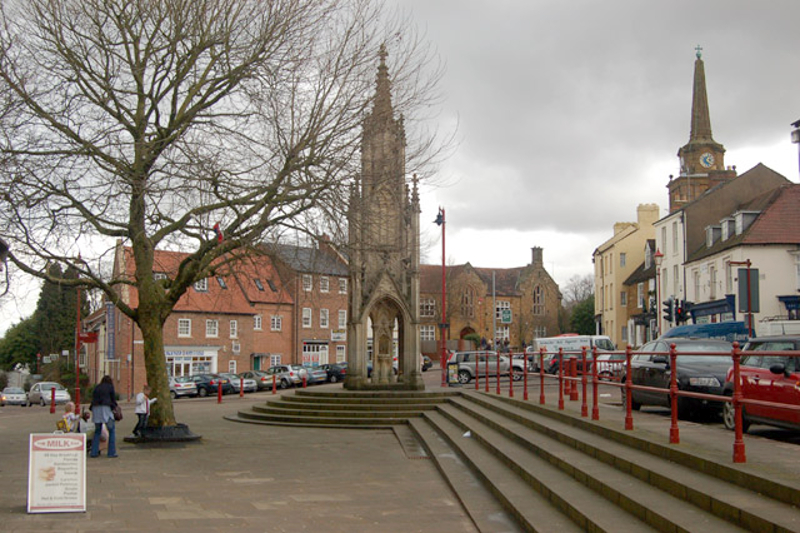
Daventry, High Street, Market Square and Burton Memorial

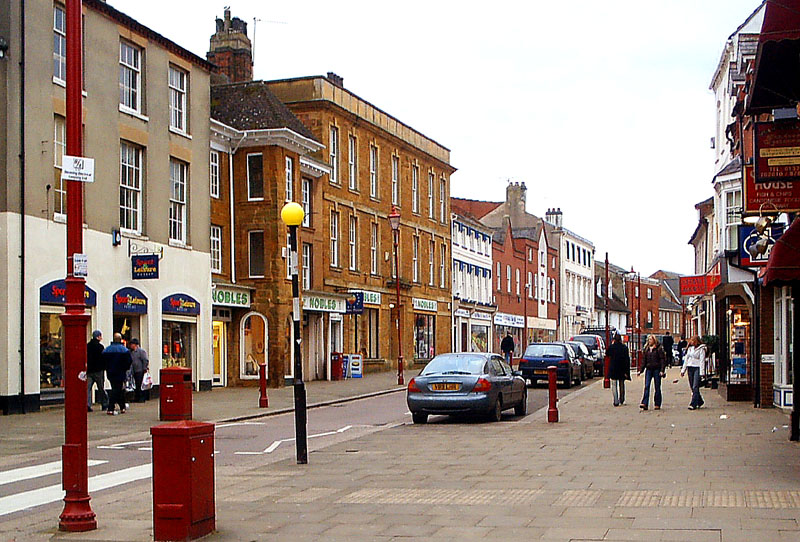
High Street, Daventry

The small historic core of Daventry, centred on High Street, Market Place, New Street, Sheaf Street and their surrounding streets is a conservation area, with most of its buildings dating from the 17th to 19th centuries including many listed buildings. Until the 1950s, Daventry was a small market town with a population of around 4,000. All of the subsequent growth of the town has occurred during the late 20th and early 21st centuries. Consequently, the historic core of the town is surrounded by modern roads, housing, and industrial estates.

There are two country parks on the edge of the town; just north-east of the town centre is the Daventry Country Park, based around a canal reservoir, just east of the A425. On the south-eastern edge of the town is the Borough Hill country park.

There are 74 buildings or groups of buildings in the centre of Daventry that are on the List of Buildings of Special Architectural or Historic Interest led by the Church of Holy Cross at grade I. Grade II*buildings include the Saracen's Head (now Wetherspoons), the Moot Hall (see below), the Wheatsheaf (now a residential home), 27, 29, 36, 57, 59 High Street and 2, 20, and 22 Sheaf Street. Grade II listed buildings include several in Market Place, Church Walk, New Street, High Street, Sheaf Street and the United Reformed Church, the Burton Memorial (commemorating Edmund Charles Burton, Town Clerk of Daventry; see photo at left), Danetre Hospital Offices (former workhouse) and Middlemore Farmhouse (now a pub), also in Drayton – School Street and Orchard Street.

A street market is held every Tuesday and Friday in High Street, although its original site was on the aptly named Market Square. There is a modern shopping precinct adjacent to the High Street called Bowen Square.

An alternative pronunciation for Daventry used by locals is 'Daintree', but this has become less common.

== History ==
=== Early history and toponymy ===
Daventry is overlooked by the 653 ft-high (199 m) Borough Hill on the eastern edge of the town. The hill has been the site of human activity dating back into prehistory: remains have been found of two Bronze Age barrows, two Iron Age hill forts – one of which is the fourth largest found in Britain, and a later Roman villa and farming settlement.

According to local folklore Daventry had Danish (Viking) origins, this was partly due to the old pronunciation of Daventry as Daintry, which was interpreted as "Dane Tree", however in more modern interpretation the town's name is thought likelier to be Anglo-Saxon in origin: "Dafa's tree" (Dafa being a founding father or paterfamila) and there was very likely a meeting tree, possibly on Borough Hill. Thus the name may have been formed on lines similar to Coventry ("Cofa's tree", i.e. "tree of Cofa"). Another theory which was popular in the 19th century, was that of Thomas Pennant, the Welsh naturalist and antiquarian, who acknowledged the town's 'considerable antiquity' and speculated that the name was Brythonic, dwy-avon-tre (town of two rivers), a derivation seemingly supported by the town's topography, situated as it is between the sources of the River Leam, which flows west, and the River Nene which flows east. This theory however is now discredited.

=== Medieval and Tudor ===
Daventry was mentioned in the Domesday Book of 1086 as Daventrei. It was recorded as belonging to Countess Judith, niece of William the Conqueror.

In around 1108, Daventry Priory a small Cluniac priory was founded at Daventry, alongside the parish church. The priory was closed in 1526 by Cardinal Wolsey who granted its assets to Christ Church, Oxford.

In 1203 a market was first recorded at Daventry. The market benefited from Daventry's location upon the main road (now the A45 road) linking the important city of Coventry with Watling Street (now the A5 road) which was the main route from the Midlands to London, which brought in much passing trade.

In 1576 Daventry grammar school was founded by William Parker, a woollen draper and native of the town. The original schoolhouse on New Street, dating from around 1600 still stands, although it is now a private house. That same year Queen Elizabeth I granted Daventry borough status.

The town was mentioned by William Shakespeare in Henry IV, Part I (Act IV, Sc II), which refers to "the red-nosed innkeeper of Daventry". Shakespeare would have known Daventry due to its relatively close proximity to Stratford-upon-Avon, and its position on the main route from the Midlands to London.

=== English Civil War ===
During the English Civil War, the army of King Charles I stayed at Daventry in 1645 after storming the Parliamentary garrison at Leicester and on its way to relieve the siege of Oxford. The King stayed at the Wheatsheaf Inn, whilst his Royalist army camped on Borough Hill.

According to local legend, it was during his stay at the Wheatsheaf Inn in Daventry that Charles was twice visited by the ghost of his former adviser and friend, Thomas Wentworth, 1st Earl of Strafford, who advised him to keep heading north and warned him that he would not win through force of arms.

However, Parliament's newly formed New Model Army, led by Sir Thomas Fairfax, was marching north from besieging Oxford after being instructed to engage the king's main army. Fairfax's leading detachments of horse clashed with Royalist outposts near Daventry on 12 June, alerting the king to the presence of the Parliamentary army. The Royalists made for their reinforcements at Newark-on-Trent but after reaching Market Harborough turned to fight, which resulted in the decisive Battle of Naseby, in which the Royalist army was heavily defeated by the Parliamentarians. The village of Naseby is approximately 14 mi (23 km) northeast of Daventry.

=== Dissenters ===
English Dissenters founded a Dissenting chapel in the town around 1722 in buildings opposite The Wheatsheaf on the southern end of Sheaf Street. Later in 1752 a Dissenting Academy was moved from Northampton to this site. The chemist and theologian Joseph Priestley studied there from 1752 to 1755. In 1789, the Academy moved back to Northampton.

=== Coaching town ===
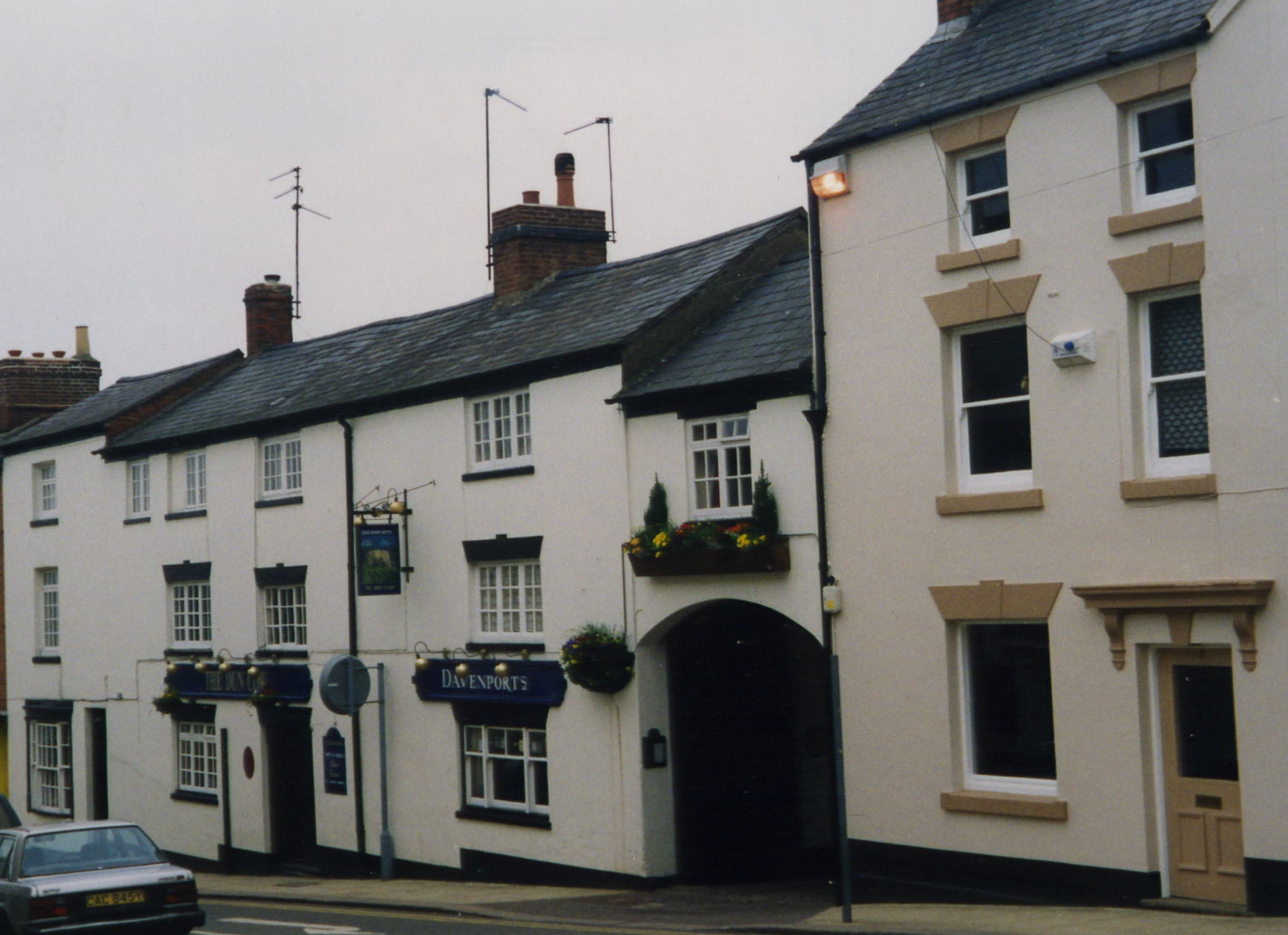
The Dun Cow, an old coaching inn, a grade II listed building

Daniel Defoe described Daventry as a "considerable market town which subsists chiefly on the great concourse of travellers on the old Watling Street way."

During the Georgian era of the 18th and early 19th century, a national system of turnpike roads with improved road surfaces developed, this in turn allowed the development of a national system of mail coaches and long distance passenger stagecoaches. Daventry, being located on the main roads linking London with the West Midlands, Holyhead and Lancashire, flourished as a coaching town. There were many coaching inns in the town including the Wheatsheaf, the Saracen's Head, the Plough and Bell, the Dun Cow, and the Brown Bear.

At the zenith of the coaching era in the 1830s, Daventry had become a major hub of the national network, with more than 250 coaches passing through the town every week, including services between London, Warwick, Birmingham, Liverpool and Holyhead, and Birmingham and Cambridge.

Reflecting Daventry's prosperity, many of the town's finest building were constructed during this period, including, most notably, the Holy Cross Church of 1758.

=== Stagnation and decline 1838–1955 ===
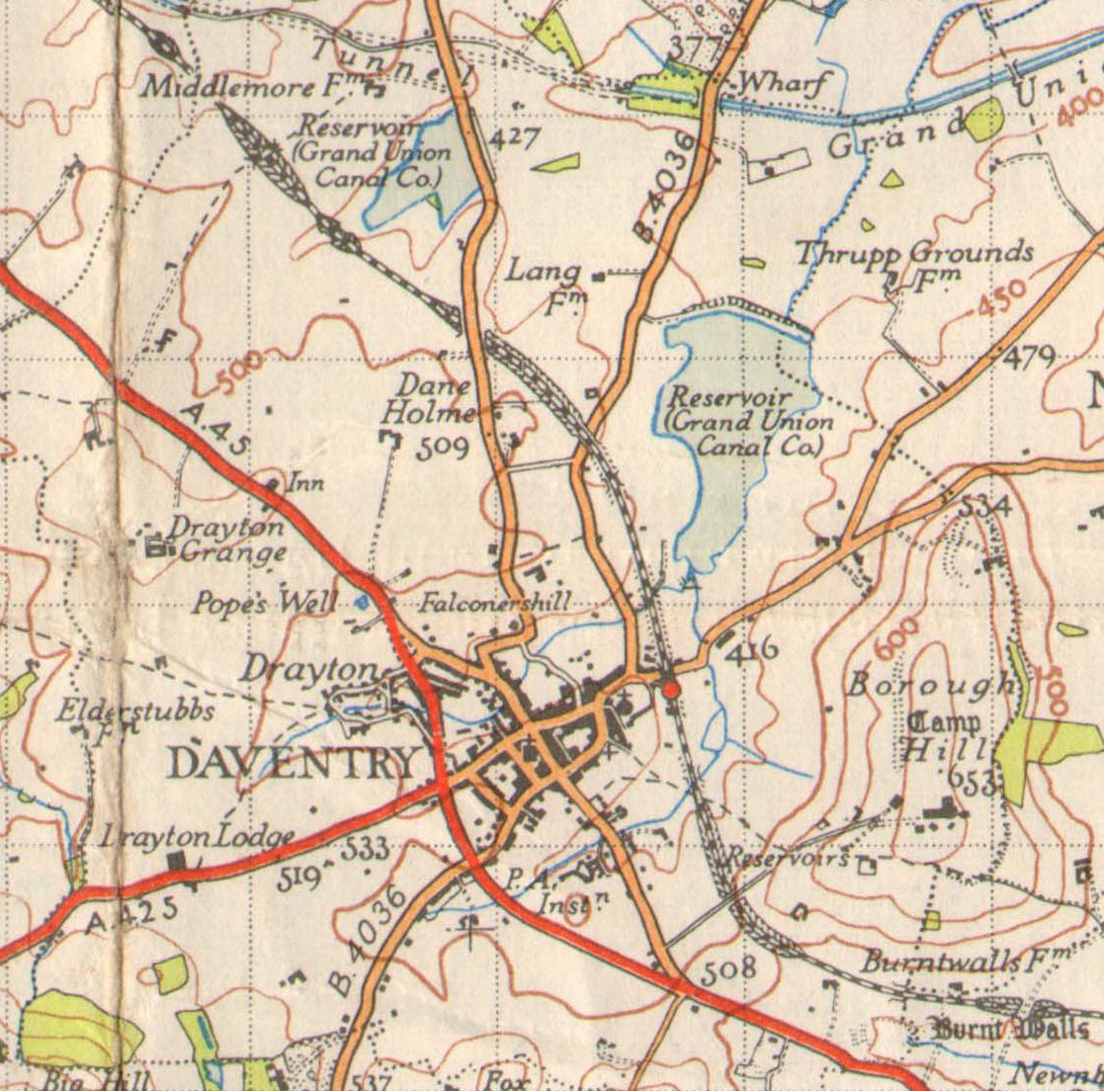
Map of Daventry from 1946

The Industrial Revolution largely passed Daventry by, owing to its failure to become linked to the newer transport networks: The Grand Junction Canal (now Grand Union) had opened in 1796, and passed a few miles north of Daventry. An arm from the canal to Daventry was proposed, and was included in the Act of Parliament authorising it, however this was never built.

The opening of the London and Birmingham Railway in 1838 signalled the beginning of the railway age; almost immediately the coaching trade slumped and Daventry entered a long period of stagnation and decline which lasted for over a century: In 1841 Daventry had a population of 4,565, from thereon it went into steady decline until 1911, when it bottomed out at 3,516, and then slowly recovered, reaching 4,077 in 1951, but did not recover to the 1841 level until later in the 1950s.

The London and Birmingham Railway passed a few miles to the east of the town through the Watford Gap. A branch line to Daventry was included in the original Act of Parliament, however, despite several earlier attempts, the line was not built until 1888, when a short branch was built from Weedon to Daventry railway station. In 1895 the line was extended to Leamington Spa. However being only a branch line this did little to revive the town's economy. The only significant industry to develop in the town during this time was shoemaking, which at its height in the 1870s employed around 700 workers.

=== Broadcasting station ===
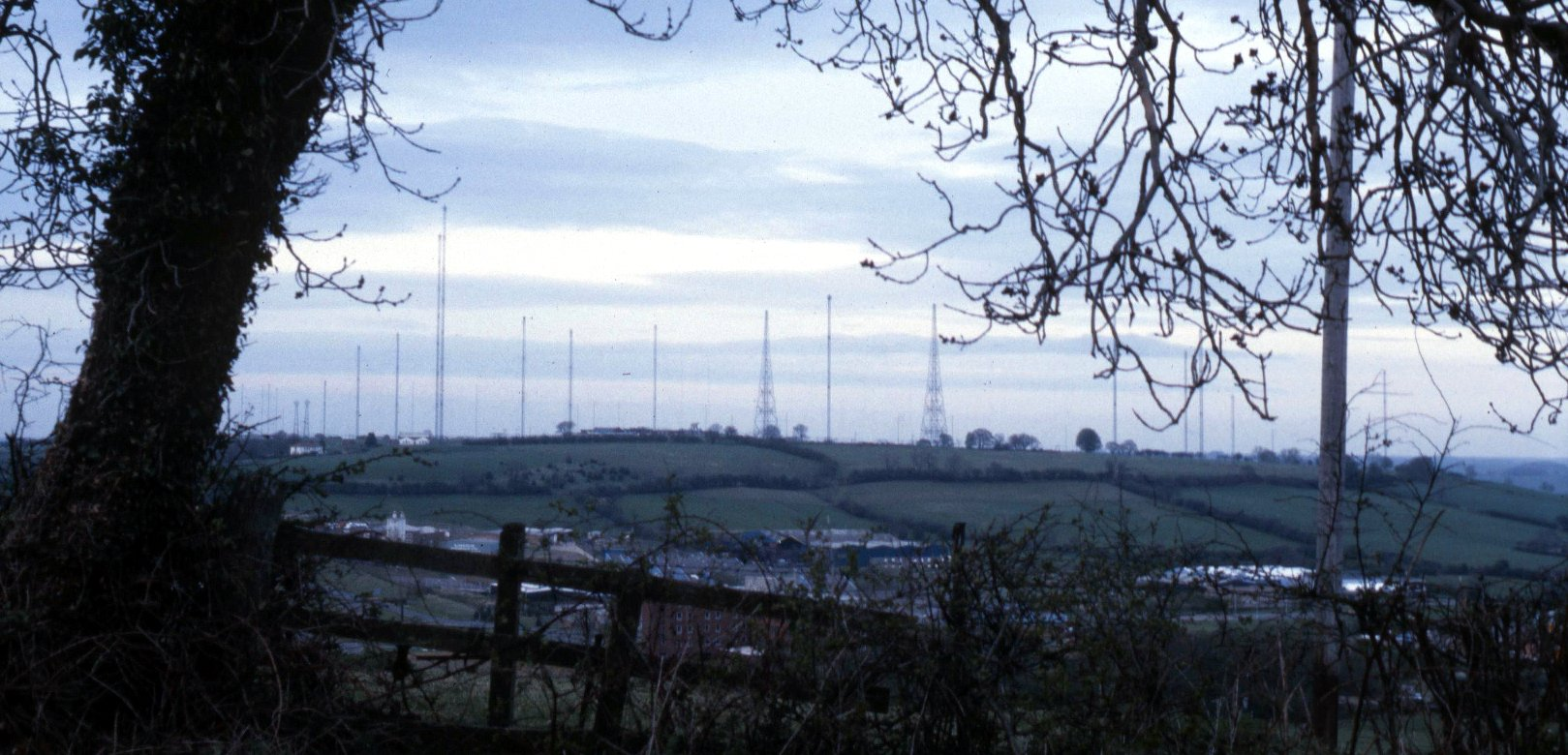
The former transmitter station on Borough Hill, around 1990

In 1925, the newly created BBC constructed a radio transmitting station on Borough Hill just outside the town. Daventry was chosen because it was the point of maximum contact with the land mass of England and Wales. From 1932 the BBC Empire Service (now the BBC World Service) was broadcast from there. The radio announcement of "Daventry calling" made Daventry well known across the world. It was the BBC's use of the literal pronunciation in this call-sign that resulted in the widespread displacement of the historical pronunciation "Daintree" (ˈdeɪntri). The transmitting station contributed to the town's population revival, as a number of BBC staff and their families moved into the area.

At its height by 1990 the station had 43 radio masts, however the station closed in 1992 and all but one of the radio masts was taken down, with most of the land being sold to Daventry District Council who opened it up to the public as a country park. A commercial unit of the BBC remained based locally for a few years after. A busy directional radio beacon (VOR), identifier "DTY", for aircraft is situated approximately four mi (six km) south of the town. The town also gives its name to the busy Daventry air traffic control sector.

==== Radar experiment ====
On the early morning of Tuesday 26 February 1935 the radio transmitter at Daventry was used for what became known as the "Daventry Experiment" which involved the first-ever practical demonstration of radar, by its inventor Robert Watson-Watt and Arnold Frederic Wilkins. They used a radio receiver installed in a van at Litchborough (just off the A5 about six mi (ten km) south of Daventry) to receive signals bounced off a metal-clad Handley Page Heyford bomber flying across the radio transmissions. The interference picked up from the aircraft allowed its approximate navigational position to be estimated, and therefore proved that it was possible to detect the position of aircraft using radio waves. The success of the experiment persuaded the British government to fund the development of a network of full scale radar stations on the south coast of England, known as Chain Home, which provided a decisive advantage to the RAF in the Battle of Britain in 1940.

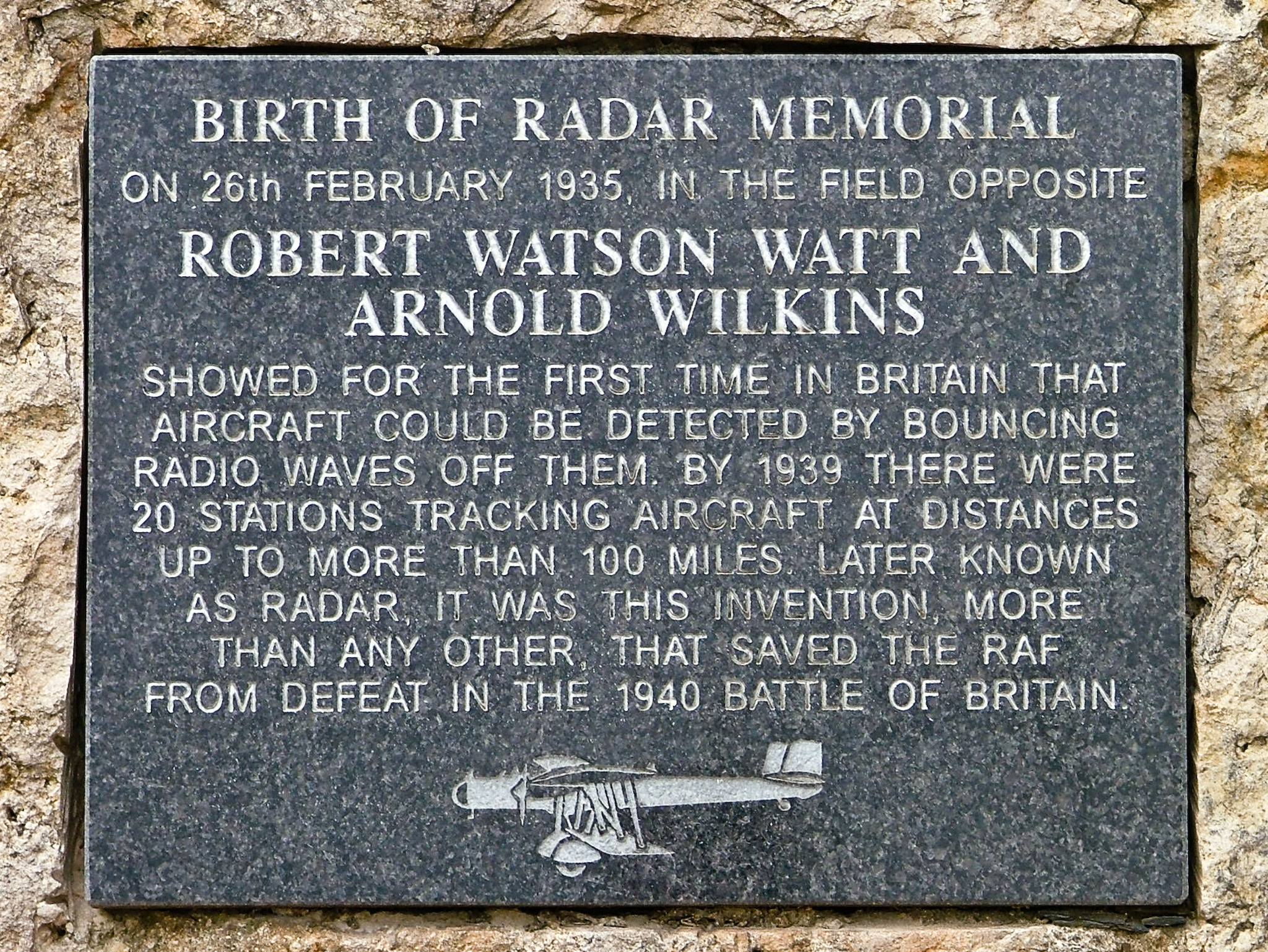
Birth of Radar memorial

75 years to the day of the original launch, on 26 February 2010, teams from the Coventry Amateur Radio Society & The Northampton Radio Club re-enacted the 'Daventry Experiment'. Signals from GB75RDF at Borough Hill, reflected from aircraft (all of which were flown by radio hams), were detected in a receiving set housed in a replica Morris van. The receiving station set up in the field that is the home to The Birth of RADAR memorial at Litchborough. The team was led by Brian Leathley, known as Andrew G8GMU.

Borough Hill was also the site of the Gee Eastern chain master transmitter mast: this was part of a radio navigation system used by the Allies during World War II. Borough Hill Roman villa is also located here.

=== Daventry since 1955 ===
The modern growth of Daventry occurred from the mid-1950s onwards. Real growth started in 1955 when the tapered roller bearing manufacturer British Timken opened a large factory in the town (the factory closed in 1993 although the distribution Centre stayed open until 2000).

The town's fortunes were also boosted when the first phase of the M1 motorway was opened nearby, giving the town a direct motorway link with London, with the expansion of the motorway network connecting it to the north of England within a decade.

Despite the growth of the town, Daventry railway station was closed to passengers in 1958, with the line closing to freight in 1963.

==== Planned expansion ====
In 1961, Daventry was designated as an 'overspill' to house people and industry relocated from Birmingham, as government policy of the time favoured moving population and industry away from Birmingham. Although Daventry was not formally designated as a New Town, its expansion bore many similarities to such developments: A planned expansion of the town was carried out as part of a three-way agreement between Birmingham City Council, Daventry Borough Council, and Northamptonshire County Council: Birmingham's role was to buy land, and build houses and industrial estates, Northamptonshire provided roads, schools and libraries, whilst Daventry provided drainage and sewage disposal.

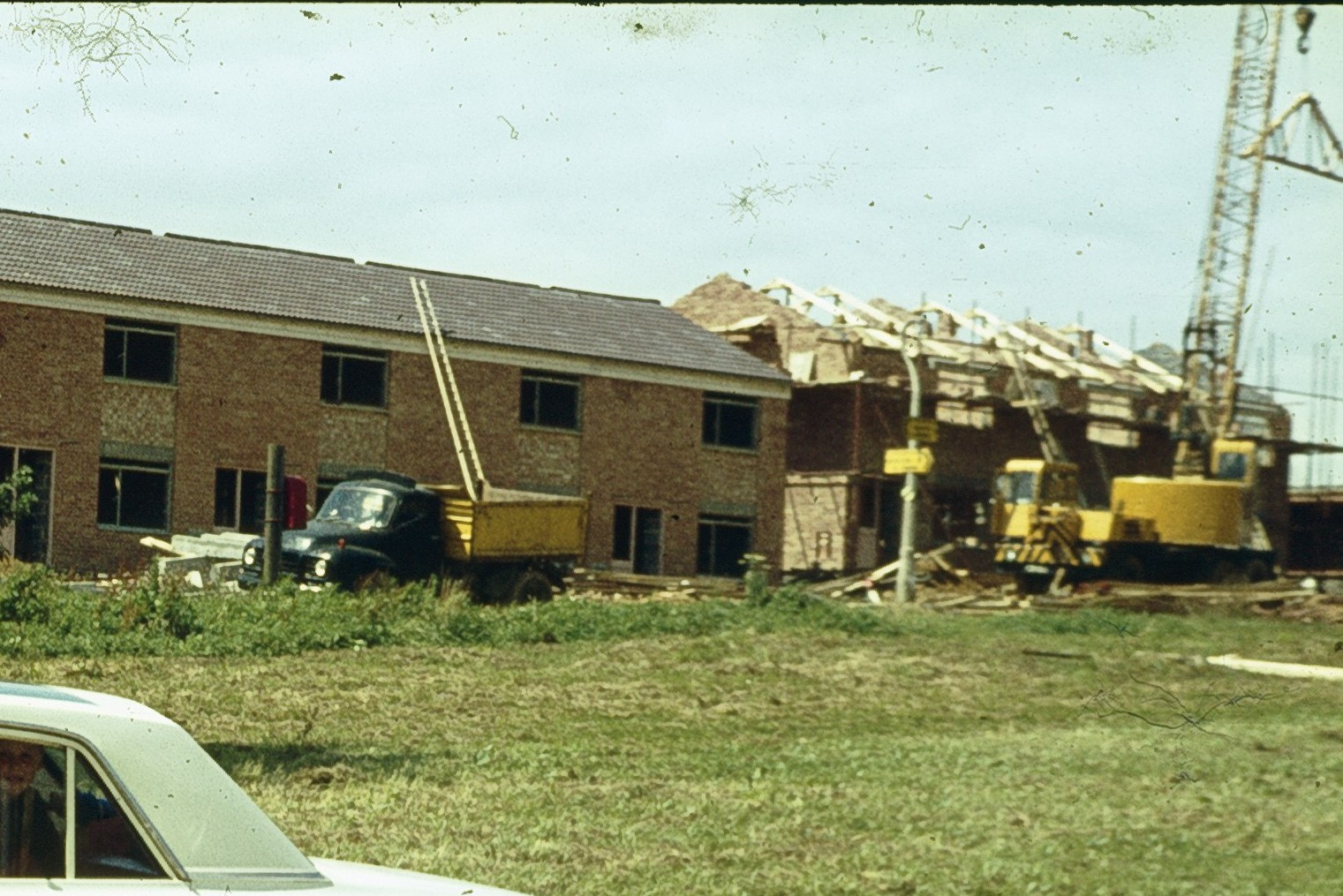
Construction of houses in Daventry in 1967

Work on the official expansion of Daventry began in the second half of the 1960s, when Birmingham City Council purchased nearly 1,000 acres (400 ha) of land to be developed for housing and industrial use. The first phase of this expansion was constructed on the south-east slopes of Borough Hill and was named the Southbrook Estate. It was designed and laid out by the architect J A Maudsley for City of Birmingham Architects Department. This began in 1966. and is designed with short terraces of dwellings grouped around a series of cul-de-sacs grouped around a large looped access road around the edge of the hill. There is a central focal point which has schools for children from early years to senior level. There are several service shops and originally there was an estate public house but that was demolished in the mid 1990s. There is also a community centre.

The plan got off to a good start, and by 1972 more than 1,000 new families had moved to Daventry, along with many new industries. However by the mid-1970s growth had slowed sharply, due to a combination of the faltering national economy and public spending cuts. The planning agreement had originally been intended to last for 30 years (until 1991) however Birmingham City Council decided to pull out of it half way through in 1976, due in part to spending cuts, but also as it had become clear that the town's plan was falling short of expectations: The target population had been 36,000 by 1981, but actual growth was much slower than this, nevertheless, between 1961 and 1981 the population had nearly tripled from 5,860 to 16,178; Subsequent growth in the following decades has been slower and driven mainly by private developments. The population had reached 22,367 by 2001, and by 2011 it was 25,026.

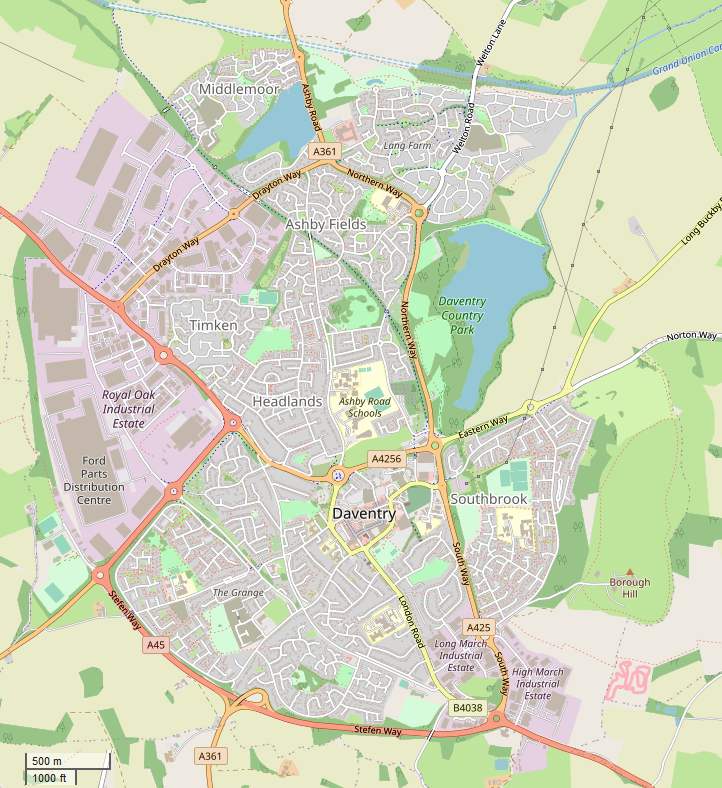
Modern map of Daventry, following its urban expansion

==== Recent history ====
Daventry was struck by an F0/T1 tornado on 23 November 1981, as part of the record-breaking nationwide tornado outbreak on that day. In 1995 RAF Daventry was listed as a USAF communication facility by the then Minister of State for the Armed Forces Nicholas Soames in answer to a question from Max Madden. RAF Daventry is most likely the transmitter base at a former WW1 isolation hospital site on the Staverton to Newnham road which was eventually sold by the Ministry of Defence in 2007.

In 2006, the outdoor pool – which had been built and funded by Daventry residents in the 1950s following the drowning of three children in the local reservoir – was closed due to funding difficulties. In 2007, Daventry began plans to modernise the town with a futuristic personal rapid transit system that would link outer estates to the town centre, and a canal arm with marina next to the former site of the outdoor pool. In May 2018, the District Council dropped the building a canal arm and marina scheme in favour of achievable projects.

In March 2018, the town's High Street was used as a filming location for the feature film, Nativity Rocks!.

== Politics and government ==
The ancient borough of Daventry was created in 1576, and was reconstituted as a municipal borough in 1835. In 1974 the municipal borough was abolished and merged into the much larger Daventry District, which also included a large rural area. In 2021 the Daventry District was itself abolished and merged into the even larger unitary authority area of West Northamptonshire.

From 1974, the area of the former municipal borough of Daventry became an unparished area with charter trustees, until 2003, when Daventry became a civil parish and gained its own Town (parish) Council. Daventry Town Council currently has 16 councillors representing four wards. The Mayor of Daventry is elected annually by the members of the town council. The town council has responsibility for a number of functions such as managing the town's market, open spaces, allotments, cemeteries, museum, and CCTV. All other local services are the responsibility of West Northamptonshire Council.

Daventry is represented in Parliament by the Daventry Parliamentary constituency, which is a safe Conservative seat, the MP representing the seat since 2024 has been Stuart Andrew.

== Notable buildings and landmarks ==
- The Holy Cross Church is the grade I listed parish church of Daventry. Holy Cross is the only 18th-century town church in Northamptonshire. It was built between 1752 and 1758 by David and William Hiorne and is constructed of the local ironstone. It has been the only Church of England church in the town, except when there was a daughter church of St James, a Commissioners' church built in 1839, by architect Hugh Smith, and stood on the east side of St James Street. It was demolished in 1962.
- The grade II* listed Moot Hall stands on the north side of the Market Square next to the Plume of Feathers inn. It was built in 1769 from ironstone and has had various uses over the years, including town council building, the mayor's parlour, town museum and tourist information office, an Indian restaurant and a children's nursery. It is of two and a half storeys, and has three bays of windows. The main entrance and its porch is on the western elevation which dates back to 1806. The original staircase from the Moot Hall is now installed at Welton Manor House.
- The Wheatsheaf Hotel is a former coaching inn on Sheaf Street, dating from the early 17th century, but refronted in the early 19th century. King Charles I stayed here before the Battle of Naseby in 1645. It is grade II*listed. It closed as an inn in 1990, and was converted into a nursing home for the elderly known as Wheatsheaf Court.
- The former Daventry Grammar School building on New Street dates from 1600, making it one of the oldest buildings in the town. It was later used as a Roman Catholic Church, and is now in use as offices. It is grade II*listed.
- The Burton Memorial at the junction of High Street and Market Square, is one of the town's most noted landmarks. It was built in 1908 in memory of Edmond Charles Burton (1826-1907) who was a prominent figure in local affairs, and served as a clerk to the Borough Council. It is grade II listed.
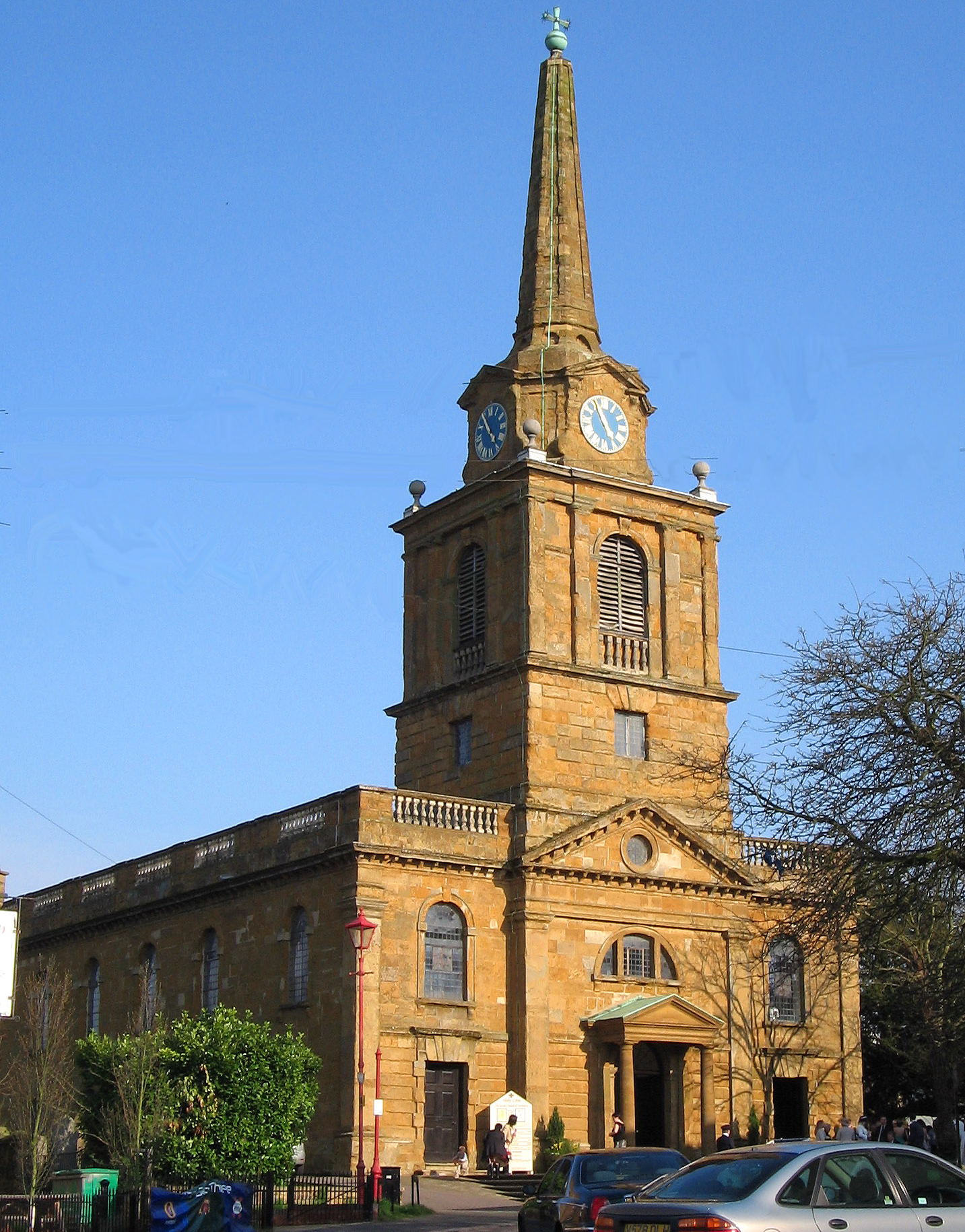
Holy Cross Church

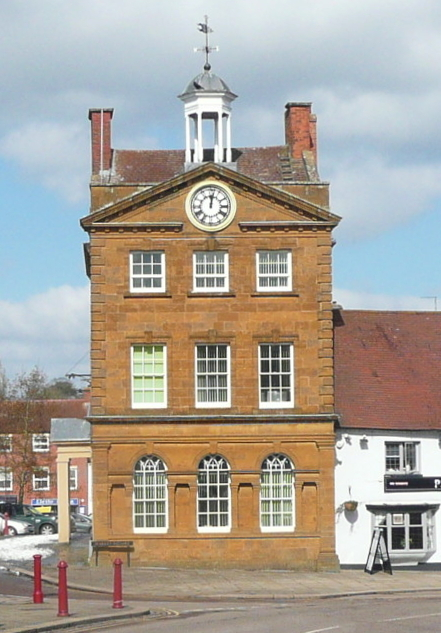
Moot Hall

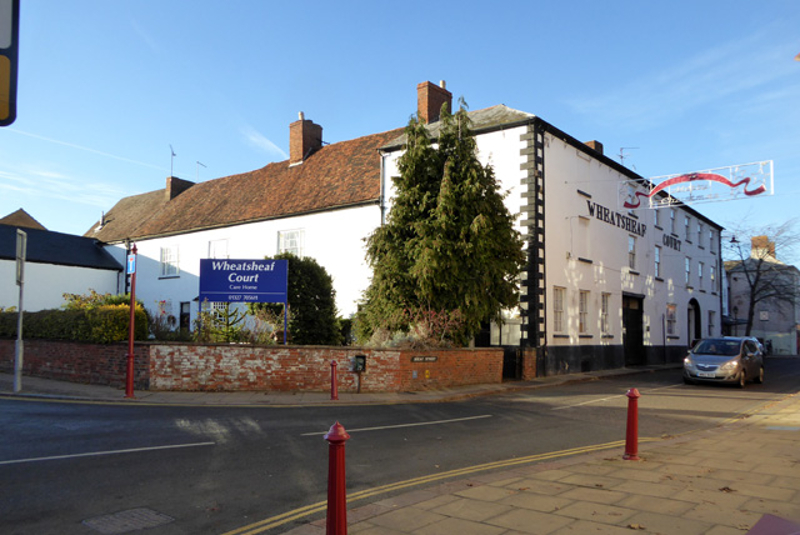
Wheatsheaf Court (formerly Hotel)

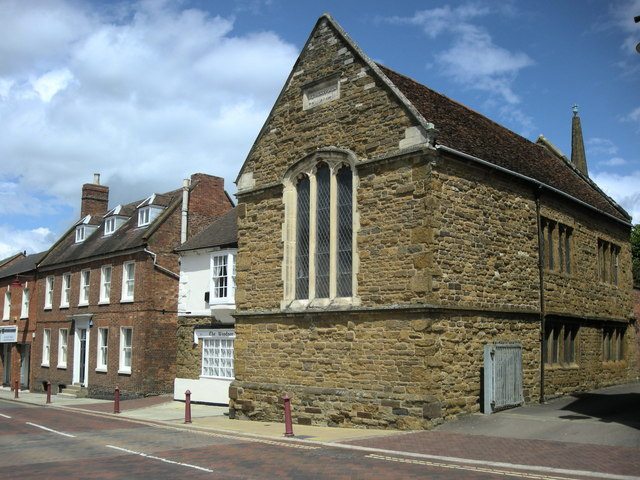
Grammar School

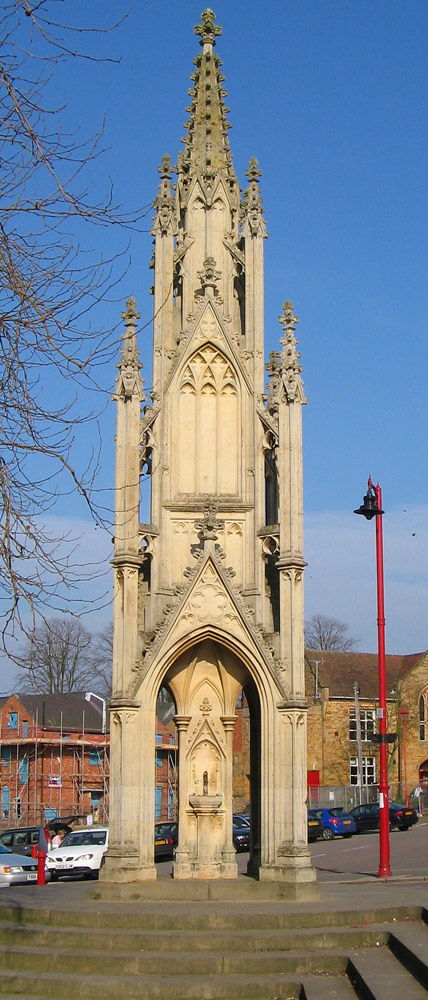
Burton Memorial

== Local economy ==
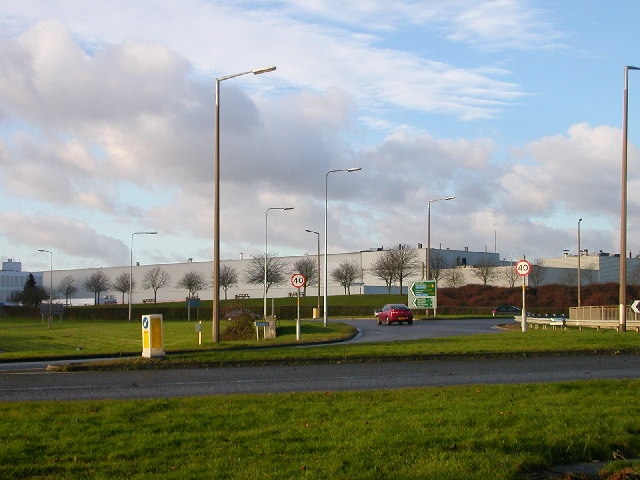
Cummins engine plant

Cummins have their largest UK plant at the town where they manufacture some of their largest diesel engines that are suitable for marine, railcar and generator set uses.

The proximity of motorways and mainline railways has led to the development of an increasingly large logistics facility, north of Daventry. This warehousing and distribution centre is known as the Daventry International Rail Freight Terminal (DIRFT). It is situated between Rugby and Crick and the A5 and junction 18 of the M1 motorway (its original northern terminus in 1959 until 1964). Stagecoach Midlands provides regular bus services D1 and D2 from Daventry and Rugby. The terminal is served by a direct connection to the Northampton Loop of the West Coast Main Line railway.

In 1972, Ford opened a large national spare parts distribution warehouse on the Royal Oak Industrial Estate in 1972 for its close proximity to the M1 motorway. The 130-acre (53-hectare) building took Taylor Woodrow a year to build at a cost of £2.25 million and was, for many years, considered the largest building in the United Kingdom.

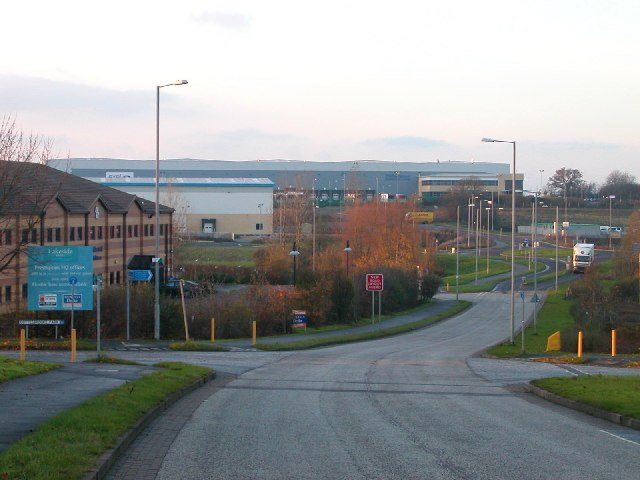
Warehouse of J. D. Wetherspoon

A new national distribution centre was opened in 2004, run by DHL, for J D Wetherspoon on the Drayton Fields Industrial Estate, north west of the town.

In 2011 a landmark building was opened in Eastern Way – the iCon. It provides conferencing and 55 supported units for businesses involved in low carbon construction and environmental technologies. It also includes a café, exhibition space and an auditorium for 300 people. Funding for the project came from the European Regional Development Fund, the East Midlands Development Agency and the West Northamptonshire Development Corporation. Daventry District Council and Northamptonshire County Council have donated the land for the project. It is now operated by the University of Northampton.

== Transport ==
=== Road ===
Daventry is near the M1 motorway with access to two junctions: 18 to the northeast and 16 to the southeast of the town.

The A45 runs around Daventry; eastbound it connects it with the A5 and the M1 at junction 16, and then Northampton. To the north-west it connects to Rugby, Coventry, and Birmingham.

The A425 connects Daventry with Southam, Leamington Spa and Warwick to the west.

The A361 connects Daventry to the A5 at Kilsby to the north, which then gives access to junction 18 of the M1. To the south-west the A361 connects Daventry with junction 11 of the M40 and then Banbury.

These roads all converge on the town's outer ringroad.

==== Bus ====
Local and regional bus services are provided by Stagecoach Midlands from their bases in Northampton, Rugby and until December 2016, Leamington Spa. Stagecoach in Oxfordshire provides an hourly service to Banbury. Villages without a regular connection to Daventry had a bookable County Connect bus service run by Centrebus under a County Council contract until 1 September 2014, when the operator changed to Kier Fleet Passenger Services. All subsidies for bus services in Northamptonshire have been discontinued due to financial mismanagement at Northamptonshire County Council, meaning most of these bus services will end.

=== Railways ===
The nearest railway station to Daventry today is Long Buckby railway station about 4 miles (6 km) northeast, where West Midlands Trains provide services via the Northampton loop of the West Coast Main Line, northbound to Rugby and stations to Birmingham New Street, and southbound to Northampton and stations to London Euston.

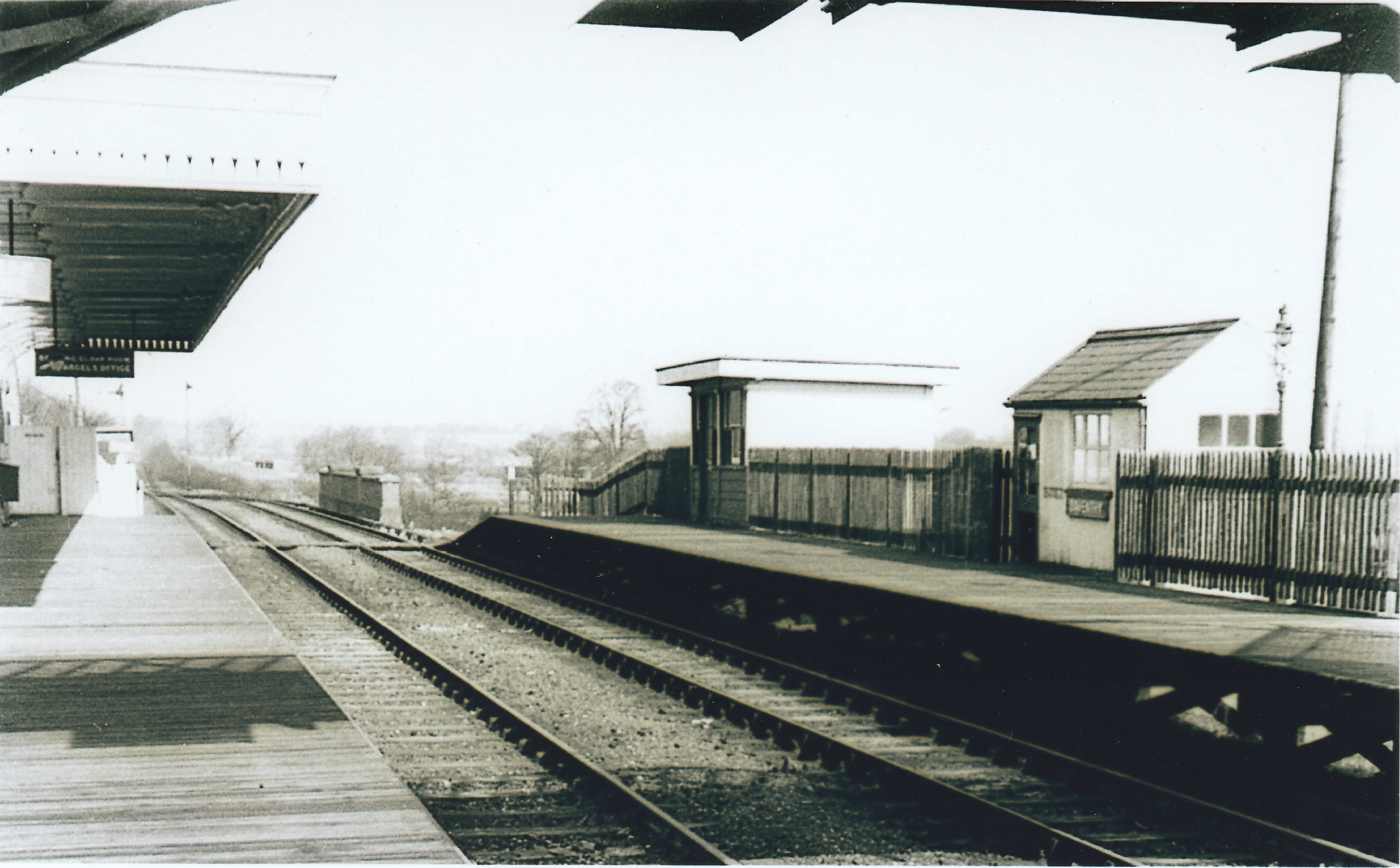
Daventry railway station operated between 1888 and 1958, it is now demolished

Daventry once had its own railway station on the former London and North Western Railway branch-line from Weedon to Leamington Spa, which opened in 1888 and was closed on 15 September 1958 and is now demolished. Daventry is now one of the largest towns in England without its own railway station.

In addition to this the former Braunston and Willoughby railway station on the Great Central Main Line which ran to the west of Daventry, was originally called Willoughby for Daventry when it opened in 1899, despite the station being around five miles north-west of Daventry in neighbouring Warwickshire. It was later renamed Braunston and Willoughby for Daventry in 1904, before the reference to Daventry was finally dropped in 1938. The station itself closed in 1957, and the line in 1966.

=== Air ===
The nearest major international airports are Birmingham Airport and East Midlands Airport.

== Education ==
Sixth form provision in the town has been confounded by successive Government policies. From September 1989, the County Council decided to close the newest of the three comprehensive schools (The Grange) and strip the Parker E-ACT Academy and Danetre and Southbrook Learning Village (DSLV) of their sixth forms. The Grange site was converted to become Daventry Tertiary College, providing education and training for 16- to 18-year-olds. When Government moved control of Further Education colleges and their assets in 2001 from county councils to the Learning and Skills Council, the Tertiary College was included. To provide greater financial and professional support, it became part of Northampton College in August 2004. Due to the strong and popular attractions of the sixth forms of nearby Rugby schools, the Daventry Learning Partnership was set up by the two secondary schools and the college (and later included Moulton College) to jointly provide a more competitive offering. After the county councils had failed in efforts to reduce the attraction of the Rugby schools, it was decided in 2010 to reintroduce sixth forms to the two Daventry secondary schools, both of which have now transformed into academies.

Today, Daventry has two secondary schools: The Parker E-ACT Academy to the north of the town and Danetre and Southbrook Learning Village to the east, near the BBC transmitter, both with thriving sixth-forms and the Daventry campus of Northampton College. In September 2013 Daventry University Technical College opened. It was part of the university technical college programme, and offered 14–19-year-old students technical as well as academic courses of education. After failing to attract enough pupils the college closed at the end of the 2016–17 school year, lasting only four years.

Primary education facilities include St James' Junior School, Falconer's Hill Academy, Abbey Church of England Academy, Ashby Fields Primary School – which is a values-based school, The Grange School and the primary part of the Danetre and Southbrook Learning Village. Monksmoor Park CE Primary School opened in September 2018. Many children from Daventry are enrolled with the surrounding village schools, such as Byfield, Badby, Newnham, Woodford Halse, Barby and Welton.

== Demographics ==
Daventry from 2001 to 2011

=== Population ===
The estimated population of Daventry in 2020 was roughly around 27,586 people. In 2011, the population sat at around 25,026 when the census was conducted that year.

Year	1801	1821	1841	1881	1911	1931	1951	1961	1981	2001	2011
Population	2,582	3,326	4,565	3,859	3,516	3,609	4,077	5,860	16,178	21,731	25,026

==== Ethnicity ====
Daventry is an ethnically homogenous town with a White majority of 95.4% in 2011, however this majority has slightly declined from when census figures for ethnicity were first collected in 1991. In the District of Daventry in 1991, whites made up a near unanimous 99% of the population however declining to 96.5% by 2011. Asian British people have increased in proportional size, making up 0.5% in the district rising to 1.5% in 2011. In the town proper, this is 2.3%. Other groups such as Mixed people, Black British and Other ethnicities have also increased in size, migration being the main reason behind growth for the latter two.

Ethnic Group	1991		2001		2011	
Ethnic Group	Number	%	Number	%	Number	%
White: Total	17,755	98.2%	21,197	97.5%	23,876	95.43%
White: British	–	–	20,738	95.4%	22,476	89.8%
White: Irish	–	–	209	1%	185	
White: Gypsy / Traveller / Irish Traveller	–	–	–	–	14	
White: Other	–	–	250	1.2%	1,201	
Asian or Asian British: Total	218	1.2%	277	1.3%	569	2.33%
Asian / Asian British: Indian	88		136		279	
Asian / Asian British: Pakistani	35		36		85	
Asian / Asian British: Bangladeshi	0		0		14	
Asian / Asian British: Chinese	64		78		80	
Asian / Asian British: Other Asian	31		27		111	
Black or Black British: Total	66	0.4%	77	0.4%	183	0.66%
Black / Black British: Caribbean	38		48		48	
Black / Black British: African	7		22		116	
Black / Black British: Other Black	21		7		19	
Mixed: Total	–	–	74	0.3%	369	1.44%
Other: Total	39	0.2%	21	–	29	0.12%
Other: Arab	–	–	–	–	3	-
Other: Any other ethnic group	–	–	–	–	26	0.1%
Total	18,078	100%	21,733	100%	25,026	100%

==== Country of birth ====
The country of birth complexion in Daventry is as follows for 1991, 2001, 2011 and 2021:

Country of birth	1991		2001		2011		2021	
Country of birth	Number	%	Number	%	Number	%	Number	%
United Kingdom	17,367	96.1%	20,794	95.7%	22,864	91.4%	23,529	83.7%
European Union	–	–	391	1.8%	–	–	2,472	8.8%
EU-14	–	–	–	–	–	–	424	1.5%
EU-8 (A8)	–	–	–	–	–	–	1300	4.6%
All other EU countries	–	–	–	–	–	–	748	2.7%
Europe (Other)	–	–	162	0.7%	1,336	5.3%	1023	3.6%
Africa	–	–	124		296		389	1.4%
Middle East and Asia	–	–	220		384		539	1.9%
Americas and Caribbean	–	–	89		118		124	0.4%
Antarctica and Oceania (or Other)	–	–	55		28		50	0.2%
Outside the United Kingdom	708	3.9%	–	–	–	–	–	–
Total	18,075	100%	21,734	100%	25,026	100%	28,126	100%

==== Religion ====
The religious composition of Daventry for 2001 and 2011 is as follows:

Religion	2001		2011	
Religion	Number	%	Number	%
Holds religious beliefs	16,026	73.7%	15,584	62.3%
Christian	15,717	72.3%	14,977	59.8%
Buddhist	54		107	
Hindu	71		136	
Jewish	13		20	
Muslim	74	0.3%	192	0.8%
Sikh	47		91	
Other religion	50		61	
(No religion and Religion not stated)	5,705	26.3%	9,442	38%
No religion	4,167	19.2%	7,846	31.4%
Religion not stated	1,538		1,596	
Total population	21,731	100%	25,026	100%

== Sport and leisure ==
Daventry has a Non-League football team, Daventry Town F.C., who play at Master Abrasives Stadium. Daventry United F.C. folded at the end of the 2011–12 season.

The town's Stefen Hill Sports Ground is home to Daventry Amateur Athletic Club and Daventry Rugby Club.

The town has two main public parks, Daventry Country Park, which features a large children's play area, fitness equipment, a range of marked walks, nature trail, and cafe, and Daventry reservoir. The smaller Daneholme park is quite close by and is bounded by the old railway cuttings, Daneholme Avenue, Ashby Road and Welton Road.

There is a leisure centre in the town centre which is well attended. It features swimming pool area, gym and a number of multi-sport areas. A children's soft play area and cafe provide non-sports-based facilities.

Golfers can enjoy the course at Daventry and District Golf Club, which is effectively on the side of Borough Hill, or head slightly out of town to Staverton Park Golf Club.

2013 saw the opening of a purpose-built skate park on New Street Recreation Ground, this was constructed in consultation with local youth groups and features challenges for boarders of all abilities.

On 7 June 2017 a major cycling event took place in the town when Daventry hosted the Grand Depart of The Women's Tour. The first stage started on the High Street and completed a lap of the town before heading off to finish in Kettering. On 14 June 2018 The Women's Tour stage two began in Rushden and finished in the High Street in Daventry.

GB3, GB4 and British F4 team Fortec Motorsport are based in the town. Fortec previously raced in the British GT Championship, Blancpain Endurance Series and Blancpain Sprint Series.

== Local media ==
Local news and television programmes is provided by BBC East and ITV Anglia. Some areas of the town can pick up BBC East Midlands and ITV Central.

Daventry’s local radio stations are BBC Radio Northampton on 104.2 FM, Heart East on 96.6 FM, Inspiration FM on 107.8 FM and Connect Radio on 107.4 FM. BBC CWR can also be received in the town through DAB.

The local weekly newspaper serving the town is the Daventry Express.

== Notable residents ==
See Category:People from Daventry

== See also ==
- The hamlet of Drayton, now a suburb of Daventry.
- Stagecoach Midlands bus routes in Northamptonshire and Warwickshire
- Grade I listed buildings in Daventry (district)
- Grade II*listed buildings in Daventry (district)
