= Moulton College =

Further education college in Northampton, England

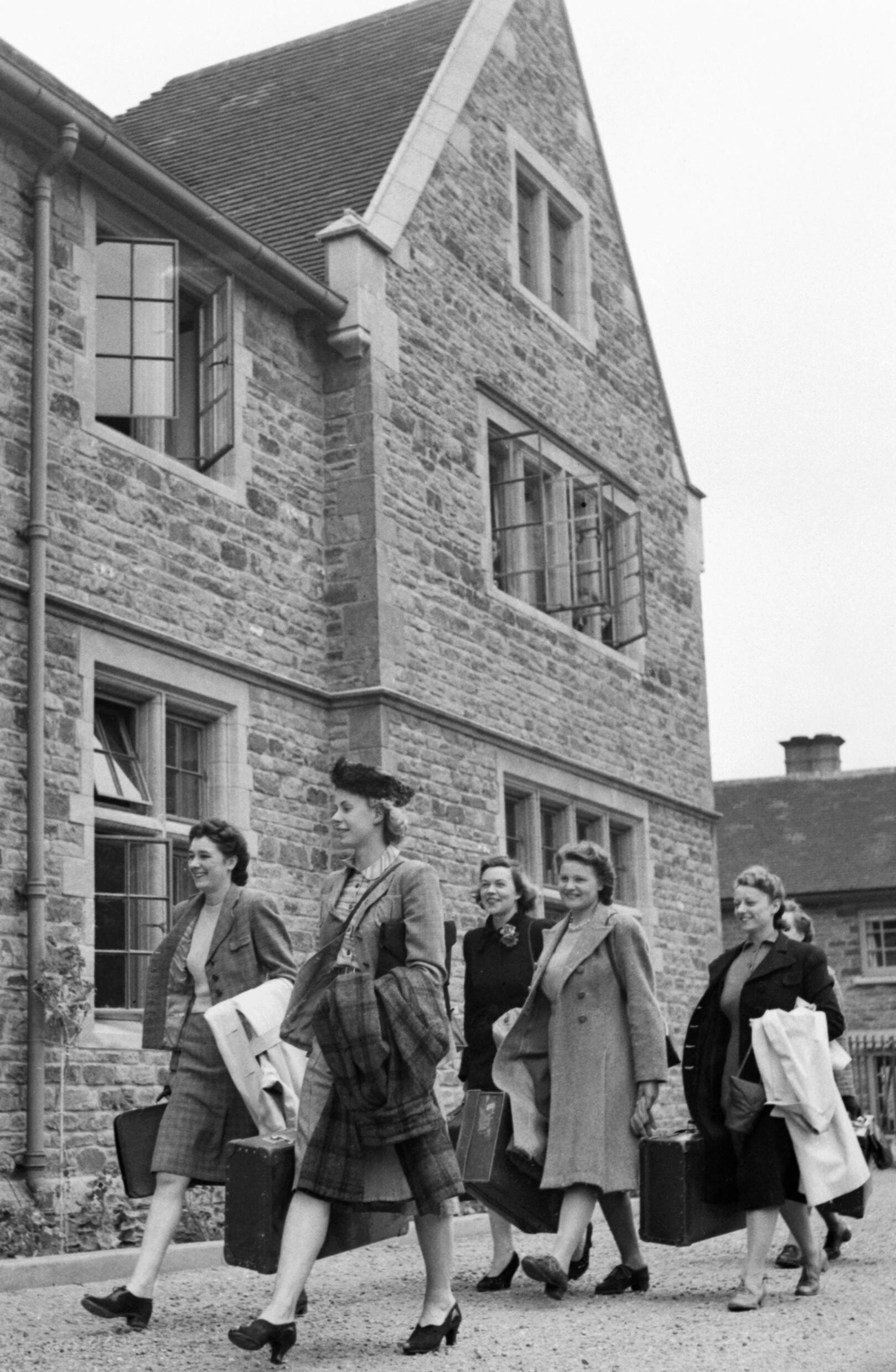
- Students arrive at the Northampton Institute of Agriculture in 1942

Location
- West Street, Moulton; Northampton, Northamptonshire, NN3 7RR; England; 52.2903°N 0.8573°W

Information
- Former name: Northamptonshire Institute of Agriculture
- Type: Further education college
- Motto: Profit through skill
- Established: 1921; 105 years ago
- Local authority: Northamptonshire
- Department for Education URN: 130772 Tables
- Ofsted: Reports
- Principal: Oliver Symons
- Gender: Coeducational
- Age: 16+
- Website: www.moulton.ac.uk

Moulton College is a further education college based in Moulton, Northamptonshire, England. Although initially established as the Northamptonshire Institute of Agriculture in 1921, it now has expanded its teaching curriculum to cover a wide range of land-based subjects, sports, and construction. Moulton College operates a number of satellite campuses in Northamptonshire, including ones in Daventry, Silverstone, and Higham Ferrers.

Moulton College teaches at all levels on the QCF framework from entry level through to doctorate level, with all BSc and MSc higher education degrees accredited with Northampton University. Academic staff at the college conduct applied research in their field of study. The college funds a number of associate lecturer posts who conduct PhD studies concurrently with teaching on undergraduate courses. The college is also a lead academic sponsor of Daventry University Technical College which opened in September 2013.

== History ==
Moulton College was established in 1921 as the Northamptonshire Institute of Agriculture.

== Subject areas on taught courses ==
=== Further Education ===
- Agriculture
- Animal welfare & management
- Arboriculture
- Bricklaying
- Building maintenance operations
- Carpentry and joinery
- Construction management
- Countryside management
- Equine studies
- Floristry
- Furniture studies
- General education
- Horticulture
- Housing practice and maintenance
- Plumbing, heating and renewable technologies
- Sport studies
- Stonemasonry
- Wall and floor tiling

=== Higher Education ===
- Agriculture
- Animal Studies
- Arboriculture
- Construction services
- Equine studies
- Horticulture
- Interior design
- Sports studies
- Teacher training
- Zoology
