= Daventry railway station =

Former railway station in Northamptonshire, England

Coordinates: 52.259184°N 1.155818°W

Daventry
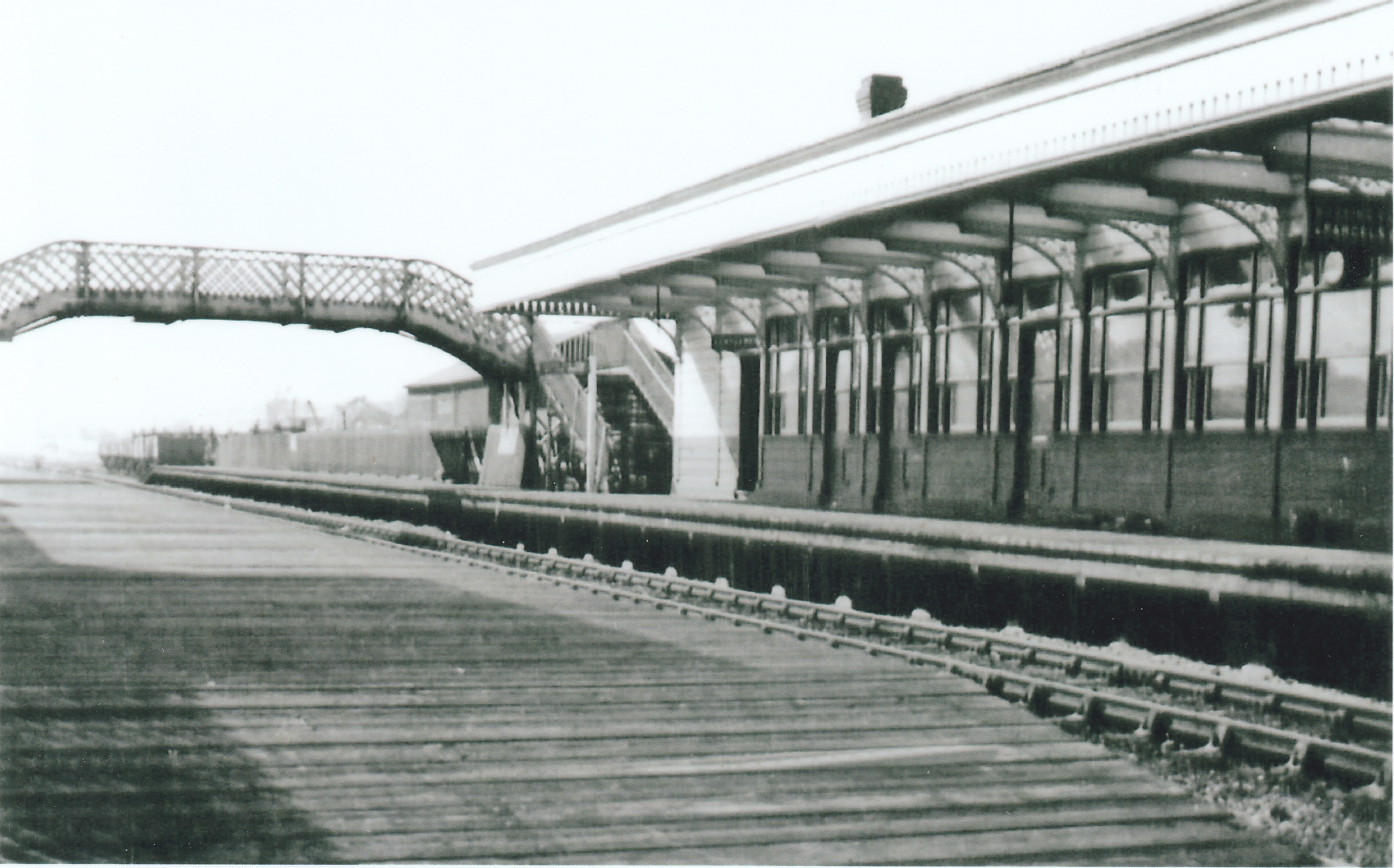
- Daventry station when open, looking south

General information
- Location: Daventry, West Northamptonshire; England
- Platforms: 2

Other information
- Status: Disused

History
- Original company: London and North Western Railway
- Pre-grouping: London and North Western Railway
- Post-grouping: London, Midland and Scottish Railway

Key dates
- 1 March 1888: Station opens
- September 1958: Station closes
Location

Daventry was a railway station serving the town of Daventry in Northamptonshire, England. It was on the Weedon to Leamington Spa branch line. The station opened on 1 March 1888 when a branch from the main line at Weedon reached the town. This line was extended in 1895 to reach Leamington Spa.

The station was located to the east of the town centre, and was made mostly from wood. It was on a passing loop and had two platforms linked by a footbridge. The main station building was located on the down (westbound) platform, with a small waiting room on the up platform. Adjacent to the station were some goods sidings. The station was closed to passengers on 15 September 1958, however the line remained open for freight until 2 December 1963.

Nothing now remains of the station. It was demolished in January 1968, and the A425 Daventry bypass built over the site. However some of the former trackbed to the north of the station remains in use as a footpath and cycleway.

Long Buckby railway station is now the nearest station to Daventry, being about 4.5 mi (7.2 km) away.

Preceding station	Disused railways	Following station
Weedon; Line and station closed	London and North Western Railway; Weedon to Leamington Spa line	Braunston; Line and station closed

== Model ==
A scale model of Daventry station made by Roger Bagnall is exhibited at the Daventry town museum.
