= Daventry Country Park =

Park in Daventry, England

Coordinates: 52.268°N 1.155°W

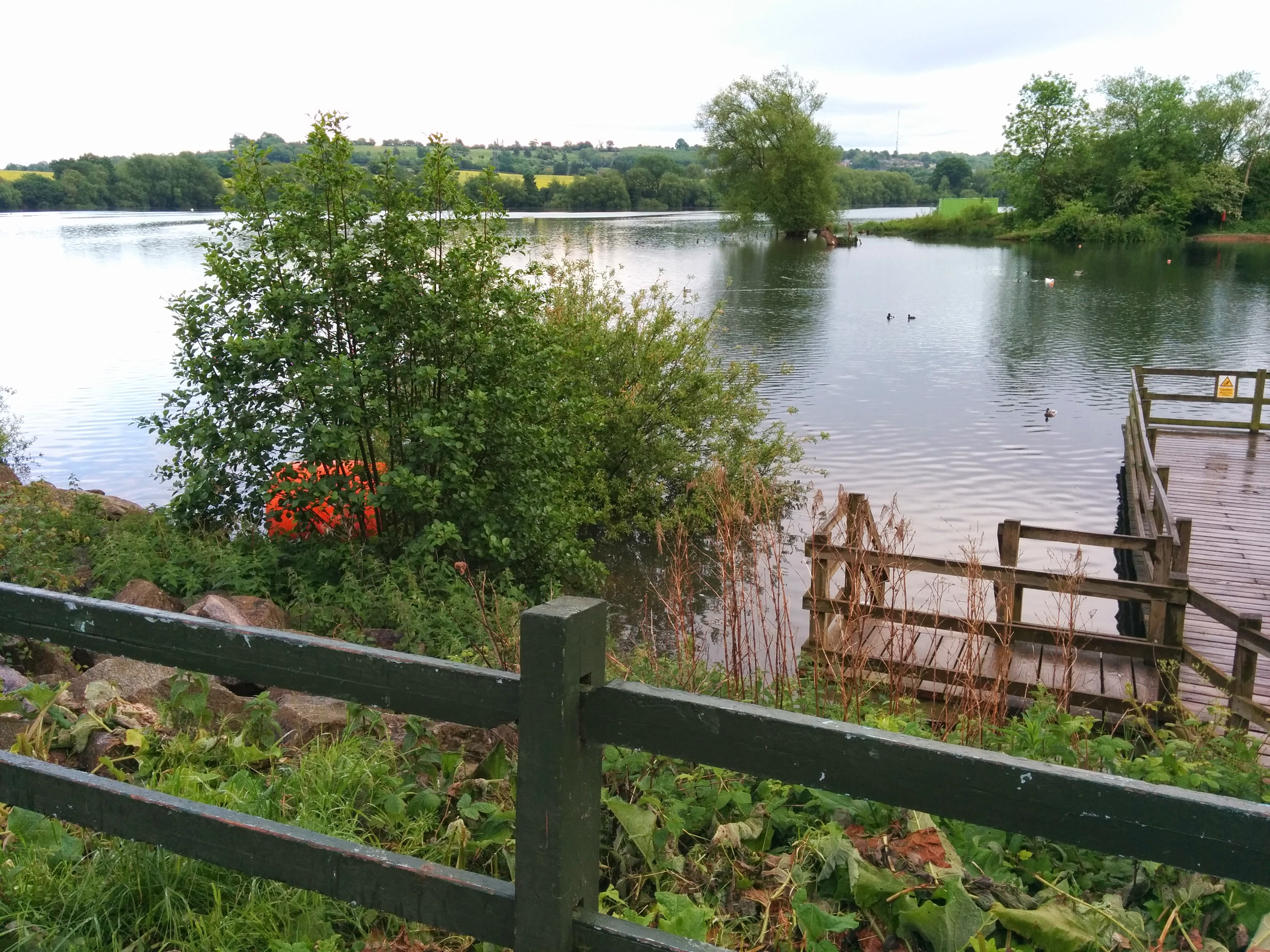
- Interactive map of Daventry Country Park
- Type: Local Nature Reserve
- Location: Daventry, Northamptonshire
- OS grid: SP 597 638
- Area: 66 hectares (160 acres)
- Manager: West Northamptonshire Council

Daventry Country Park is a 66-hectare (160-acre) Local Nature Reserve and country park on the north-eastern outskirts of Daventry in Northamptonshire, England. It is owned and managed by West Northamptonshire Council.

The park centres on Daventry Reservoir, which feeds the Grand Union Canal, and there are also meadows and crack willow woodland. Birds include yellowhammers, lesser whitethroats, dunnocks and song thrushes.

Facilities include a bird hide, a nature trail, an adventure playground, and a cafe.
