= Daventry University Technical College =

Location
- Ashby Road; Daventry, Northamptonshire, NN11 0QE; England; 52°15′48″N 1°09′50″W

Information
- Type: University technical college
- Established: 2013
- Closed: 2017
- Department for Education URN: 139373 Tables
- Ofsted: Reports
- Principal: David Edmondson
- Age: 14 to 19
- Website: http://www.daventryutc.com/

Daventry University Technical College was a University technical college (UTC) in Daventry, Northamptonshire, England which opened in September 2013. The UTC specialised in engineering, construction and environmental sustainability.

Daventry UTC had the capacity to provide education for up to 600 14- to 19-year-olds. It closed in July 2017 due to low enrollment. The building was taken over by The Parker E-ACT Academy from September 2017.

The UTC was sponsored by the University of Northampton, Moulton College and local businesses.
