= Welton, Northamptonshire =

Village in Northamptonshire, England

Coordinates: 52.28929°N 01.148929°W

Welton
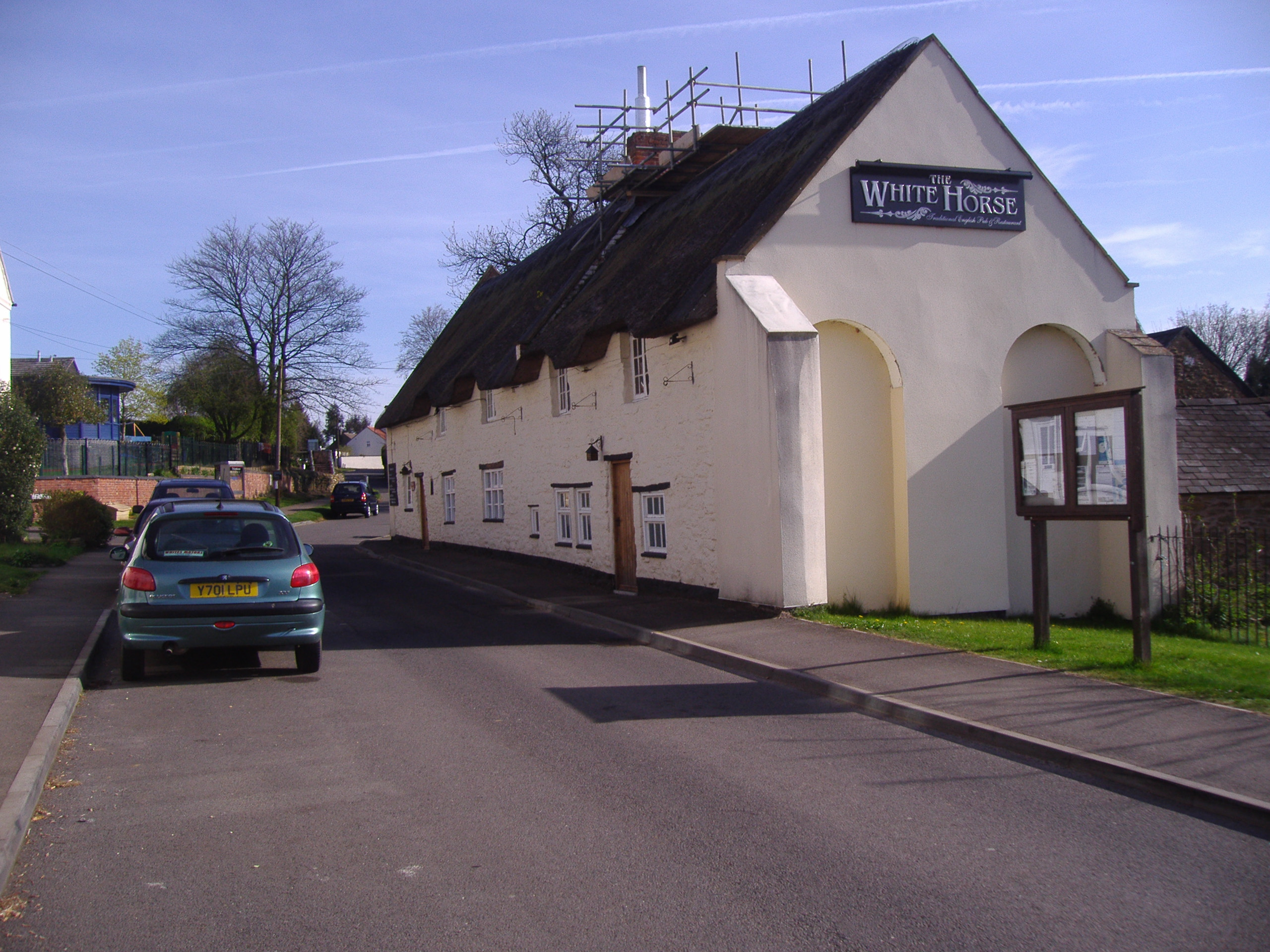
- White Horse public house, Welton

- Location within Northamptonshire
- Population: 596 (parish, 2021 census)
- OS grid reference: SP5866
  - London: 78 miles (126 km)
- Unitary authority: West Northamptonshire
- Ceremonial county: Northamptonshire
- Region: East Midlands
- Country: England
- Sovereign state: United Kingdom
- Post town: DAVENTRY
- Postcode district: NN11
- Dialling code: 01327
- Police: Northamptonshire
- Fire: Northamptonshire
- Ambulance: East Midlands

Welton is a village and civil parish in the county of Northamptonshire, England. The village is located 3 miles (4.8 km) north of the nearest town Daventry. It is 13 miles (21 km) west-north west of Northampton and 9 miles (14 km) south east of Rugby. The village is 1 mile (1.6 km) off the A361 that runs between Daventry and Crick where the A5 and the M1 junction 18 gives access to the national motorway network north and south.

Welton formerly had its own railway station, but today, the nearest railway station is at Long Buckby. The village and parish of Welton had in the 2021 census, a population of 596. For the purposes of local government, the village falls within West Northamptonshire.

== Description ==
The village and parish of Welton is within the district of Daventry in the west of the county of Northamptonshire. The village is located in the centre of the parish with a large portion of the village sitting on the south east slope of Crockwell hill, one of the many low range hills which characterise this part of the Northamptonshire Uplands. To the north the parish is bounded with the parish of Ashby St Ledgers. To the east the boundary is marked with the route of the A5 Watling Street, the name given to an ancient trackway in England and Wales that was first used by the Celts, and later improved and paved by the Romans. To the east of this highway is the parish of Long Buckby. To the south lies the parishes of Daventry and Norton, whilst to the west is the parish of Braunston. The southern boundary is also marked by the course of the Grand Union Canal which also dissects the eastern boundary for a short looping distance.

== History ==
The name Welton derives from the Old English meaning Wel or spring and Ton being the Saxon word for a village. Archaeological evidence as shown that the six wells in the parish prompted a Roman encampment.

=== The Domesday Book ===
Welton has an entry in the Domesday Book of 1086 where its population, land ownership and productive resources were extensively detailed In the survey Welton is recorded by the names of Waletone, Weletone and Welintone. The tenants pre-conquest was Wulfrner from the Count of Mortain, Osbern from Hugh de Grandmesnil and Leofric from the Countess Judith. The survey also list that there was a mill.

== Prominent buildings ==
=== The parish church of Saint Martin ===
The parish church has a prominent position in the centre of the village. The building is constructed from Northamptonshire Iron stone. At the western end there is a square tower with corner buttresses, which dates from the beginning of the 14th century. There is an octagonal clock face on the western elevation of the tower. The line of an earlier nave roof is visible on the tower. The nave is in the perpendicular style and has four-bay arcades. The nave and aisles sharing a single roof. There are big panelled aisle windows which provide plenty of light in this church. The chancel is also perpendicular, with a vestry to the north in the angle between nave and chancel. On the south elevation there is a doorway with a porch. The simple font is late medieval. The pulpit was carved by local villagers and has an 18th-century memorial plaque on the wall beside it. Also of interest is the wooden alms box which has a carved open palm on top and stands by the south door. In front of the altar at the eastern end of the church there is a 19th-century polychrome marbles and malachite floor which is reputed to be a Russian gift.

=== Welton Church of England Primary School ===
The first school in the village was established in 1820 and situated near to the present school building. The school moved to its present site in Well Lane in 1910 and it was extended in 1976, 1995 and 2004. The school's catchment area consists of the villages of Welton and Ashby St Ledgers, but in addition, a number of pupils come from the nearby town of Daventry and other surrounding villages. The school is very popular and has been oversubscribed for several years. In 2005 the school's Key Stage 2 contextual value added measure was in the top 3% of schools nationally. The present school consists of five classrooms, a hall, library and an ICT suite. There are 2 designated activity areas, staff room, administration office and headmasters study. Outside the school there is a landscaped playground and use of the adjoining recreation field for sports activities.

=== Welton Place ===
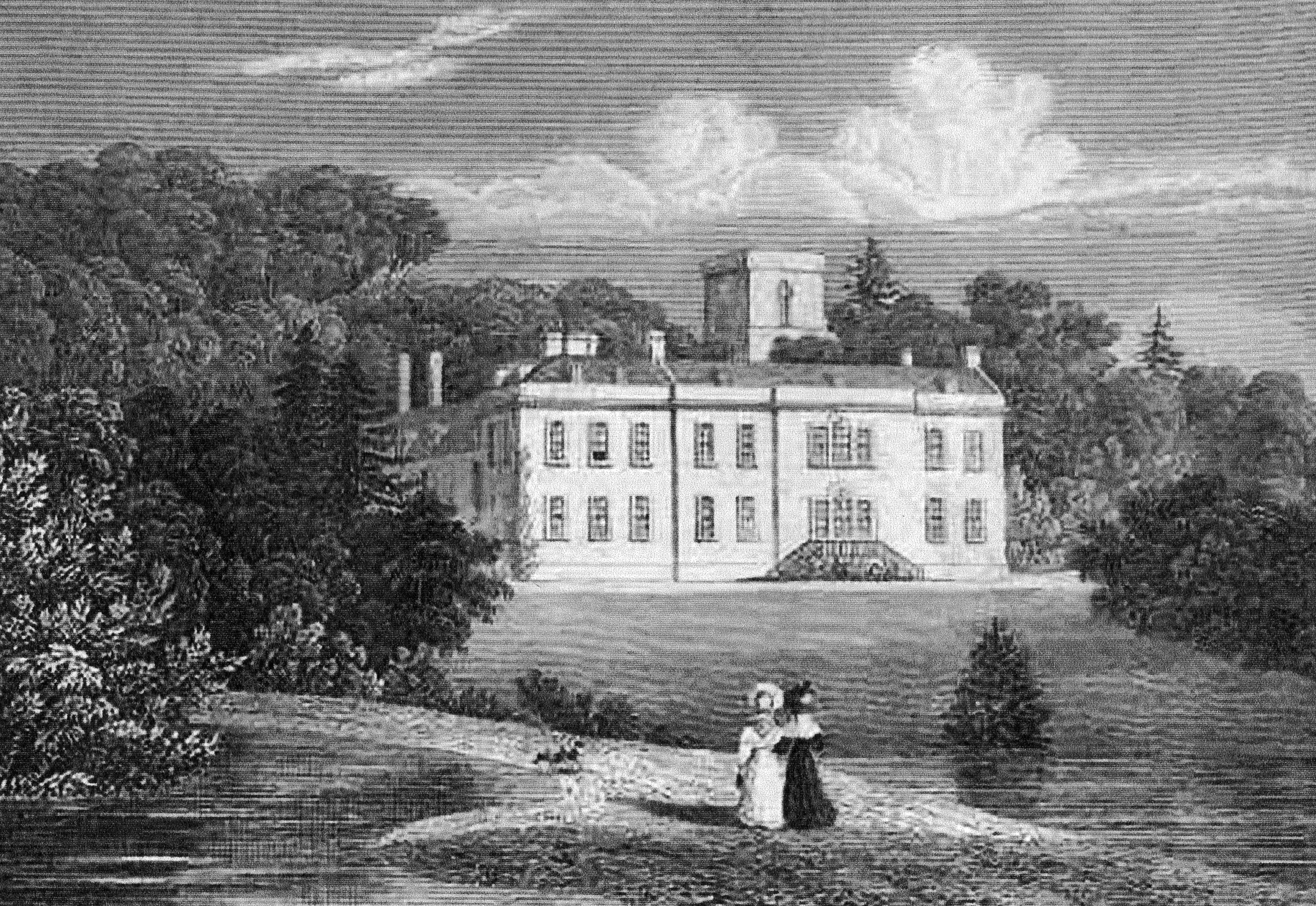
An 18th century etching of Welton Place

Welton place was a large country house which once stood in the village which was demolished in 1972. It was built by Joseph Clarke in 1758. The Clarke family had been associated with the parish of Welton since around 1596. Joseph Clarke had been High Sheriff of Northamptonshire. Welton Place was known to the locals as 'The Big House' and it had been in the possession of the Clarke family for a further century after its completion. The house was situated by a lake around which were planted rare Cedar trees some of which are protected and can still be seen as can the lake. When Joseph Clarke died he left the house to his brother Richard Clarke of Nortoft, a hamlet close to the village of Guilsborough. When Richard Clarke died 1774 he left the house to his wife. Richard Clark's great nephew John Plomer inherited the Clarke estates and added the surname to his own in 1774 but it seems did not own Welton Place until he purchased from Richard Clark's widow in 1804. In 1806 John Plomer Clark as he now was, married in 1806 the daughter of Sir John Nelthorp, a Miss Anne Marie Charlotte Nelthorp. In 1803 Plomer Clark raised the Daventry Volunteers and was High Sheriff of Northamptonshire in 1814. He also commanded the Western Regiment, Northamptonshire Local Militia. John Plomer Clark died on 23 March 1826 without issue and so the house was left to his Brother. The last Clark to inherit the house was called Richard. Eventually the house was rented to Major Harry Sebastian Garrard who was the Crown Jeweller, who was world-renowned for important jewellery works. His work includes a small diamond crown created in 1870 Queen Victoria, which she often dressed in and is one of her most enduring images. Other notable works of Garrard include Queen Mary's Crown for King George V's Coronation and the Imperial Crown of India worn by King George V worn by him at the Delhi Durbar later the same year. In 1937 Garrard remounted the Imperial State Crown, and made further adjustments for The Queen for the Coronation in 1953. Local folklore says that royalty may have visited Welton Place but no evidence has been uncovered to substantiate this claim.

Welton Place was converted to flats but ultimately demolished in 1972.
