= East Haddon =

Village in Northamptonshire, England

Coordinates: 52.3106°N 1.0261°W

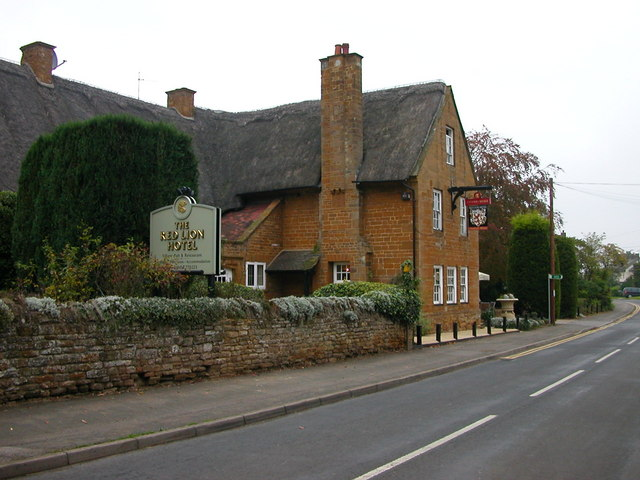
- The Red Lion, East Haddon

- Location within Northamptonshire
- Population: 643 (2011)
- OS grid reference: SP6668
- Unitary authority: West Northamptonshire
- Ceremonial county: Northamptonshire
- Region: East Midlands
- Country: England
- Sovereign state: United Kingdom
- Post town: Northampton
- Postcode district: NN6
- Dialling code: 01604
- Police: Northamptonshire
- Fire: Northamptonshire
- Ambulance: East Midlands
- UK Parliament: Daventry

East Haddon is a village and civil parish in West Northamptonshire, England. The village is located approximately midway between the towns of Northampton and Daventry, with each town being around 8 miles to the east and west of the village respectively.

East Haddon is close to Althorp, the stately home and estate of the Spencer family, and surrounded by the villages of Ravensthorpe to the north, Holdenby to the east, Great Brington to the south, and Long Buckby to the west.

The village was first mentioned in the Domesday Book (1086) as Edonne, possibly meaning "heather-covered hill"; the prefix East was added in later years to distinguish it from the nearby village of West Haddon.

The oldest building in the village is St Mary's Church, parts of which date from the 12th century. East Haddon Hall was built in the 18th century. The village has many thatched cottages built in the local Northampton Sand ironstone. At the time of the 2011 census, the parish's population was 643 people, down from 651 at the 2001 census.

== Geography ==
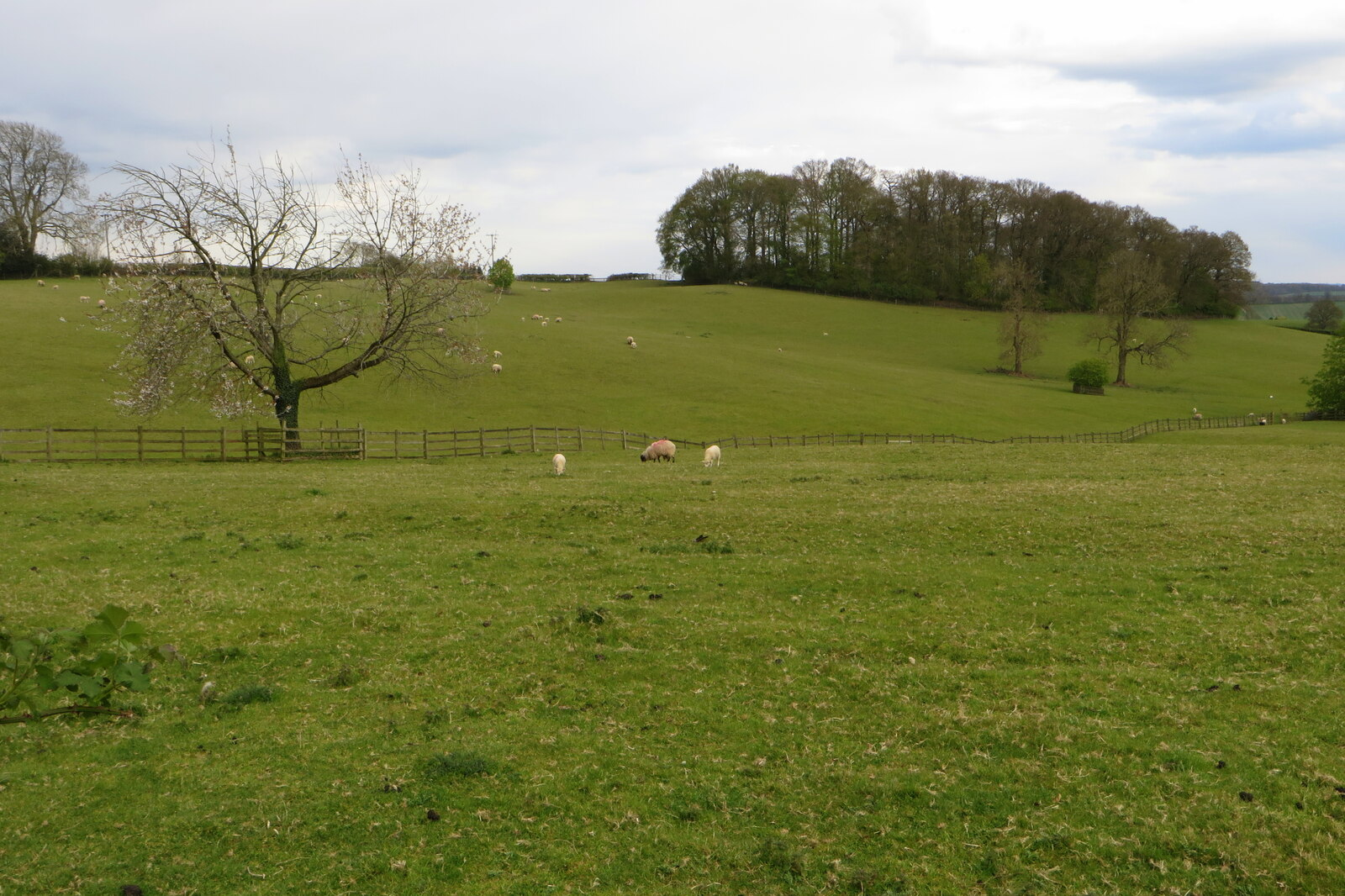
A view of Tire Hill Spinney

The village lies approximately midway between the towns of Northampton and Daventry, with each town being around 8 miles to the east and west of the village respectively.

East Haddon is close to Althorp, the stately home and estate of the Spencer family, and surrounded by the villages of Ravensthorpe to the north, Holdenby to the east, Great Brington to the south, and Long Buckby to the west.

The parish falls within the Northamptonshire Uplands, a national character area defined by Natural England and possess many typical characteristics; it covers circa 1080 hectares and lies between two east flowing streams between 180m and 90m above sea level. Most of the lower ground is Upper Lias Clay but the main east to west ridge across the centre of the parish is Northampton Sand overlaid by patches of Boulder Clay and glacial sands and gravels.

== Governance ==
The village has its own parish council which is made up of 9 councillors and falls under the Long Buckby ward for local elections. East Haddon is part of the Daventry parliamentary constituency, which has been represented by a member of the Conservative Party since 1974.

The village is currently governed by West Northamptonshire Council. Before local government changes, the local district council was Daventry District Council in the former Northamptonshire County Council area.

== Economy ==
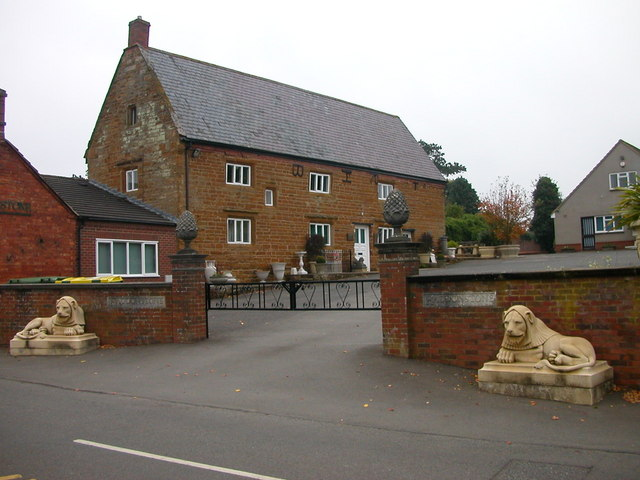
The village is home to Haddonstone show gardens

East Haddon has been home to Haddonstone, a stone supplier, since 1971. The show gardens in the village are on the site of the company's head offices, and have been featured in books by gardening writers Peter Coates and Timothy Mowl.

The gardens are maintained throughout the year and contain garden ornament and cast stone architecture products sold by the company. The gardens are also open for the National Garden Scheme, and raised over £1,000 in May 2012.

In 2015, Grovelands Business Park was established to the west of the village from the ruins of old agricultural buildings. The site provides office facilities to several local businesses. A solar farm was added in 2024. There are plans afoot to build additional office space, a cafe and a gymnasium at the site.

== Education ==
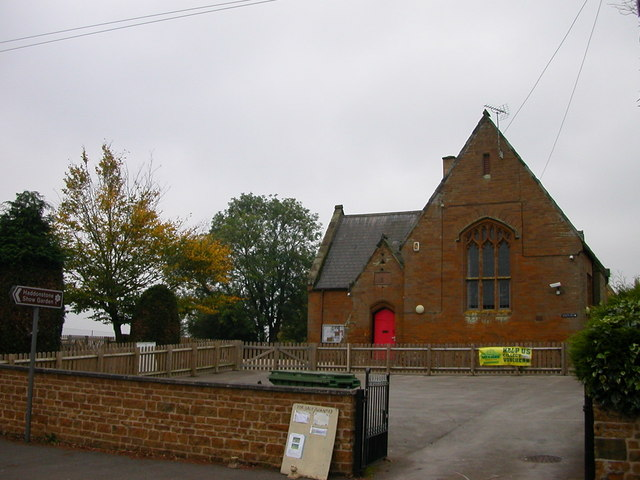
East Haddon Primary School

The East Haddon CEVC Primary School is the only school in the village; the original classroom was built in 1790 when the school was founded. It was originally a boys school, with a separate girls school being situated at the top of Ravensthorpe Road.

The school building was extended in the mid-19th century and further enlarged in 1904 and again in 1973. In 2014, the primary school was rated Outstanding by Ofsted, which was upheld in 2020 when it was inspected again.

The village falls under the catchment area of the nearest secondary school, Guilsborough Academy, and there are also a number of private schools nearby. Additionally, there are a number of state schools in Northampton and Daventry.

== Recreation ==
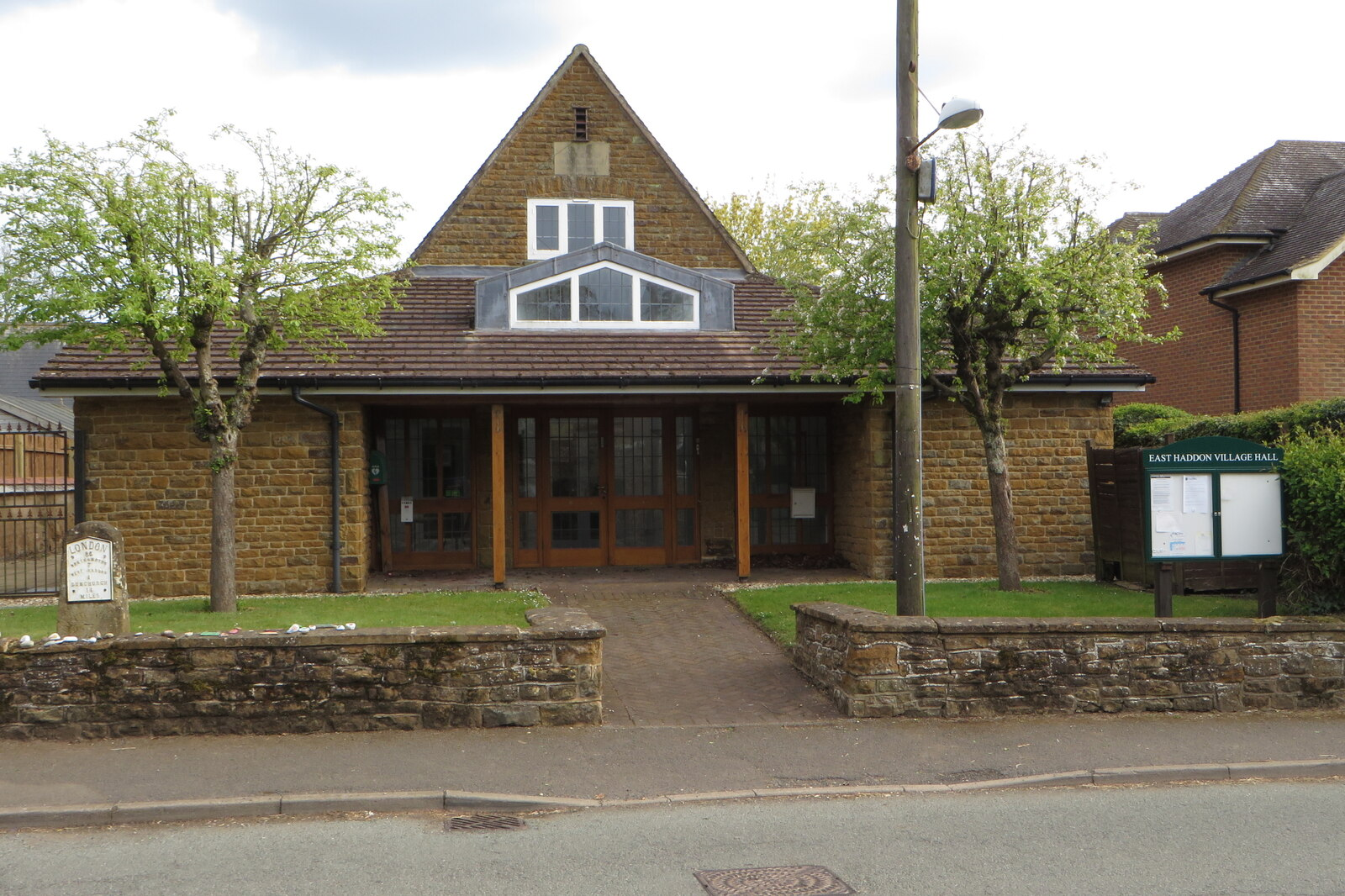
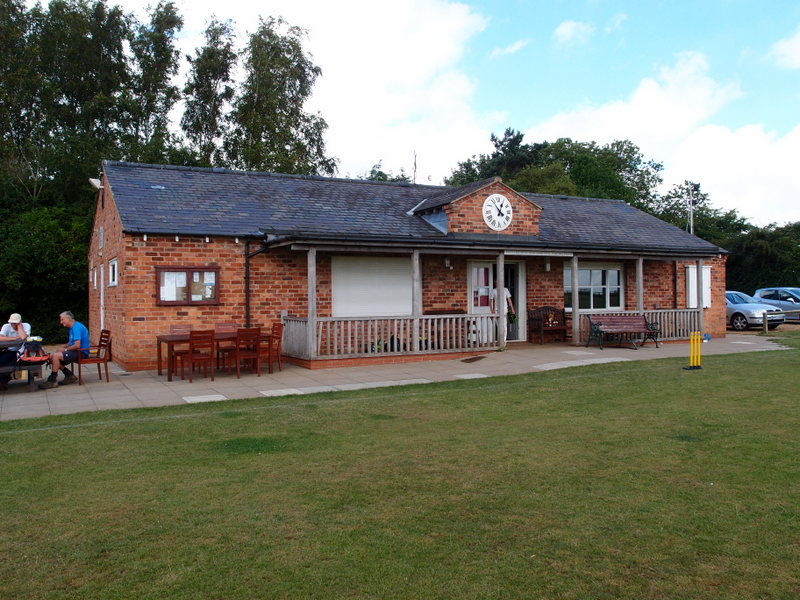
The Village Hall and Sports Pavilion

The Village Hall, formerly known as the Village Institute, was given to the people of East Haddon in 1914 by Lady Horne, who lived at Priestwell House, in memory of her son.

During the First World War, the Institute was used as a convalescent home for soldiers and during the Second World War as a day centre for expectant and new mothers from the maternity hospital then at East Haddon Hall.

In 1985, the Institute was renamed The Village Hall and in 1998 was renovated. It now provides a meeting place for local groups and the Village Society and Bridge Club and hosts coffee mornings, talks, quiz nights, fitness sessions and celebratory sessions for the local community.

East Haddon War Memorial Playing Fields was established in February 1950. The 4.9 acres of open space is used for both sport and leisure and provide a home for Haddon Cricket Club as well as offering a children's play area, two table tennis tables and an all-weather tennis court. The Sports Pavilion, built in 1998, is used by the sports clubs and also hosts events, classes and parties. The Playing Fields is also the location of the annual Bonfire Night celebrations in November.

The village hosts an annual open garden day in the spring where several villagers open their private gardens to raise money for the National Garden Scheme. Other popular events include seasonal markets and Christmas events at St Mary's Church. The Northamptonshire Beekeepers' Association also have an apiary just north of the village.

== Notable buildings ==
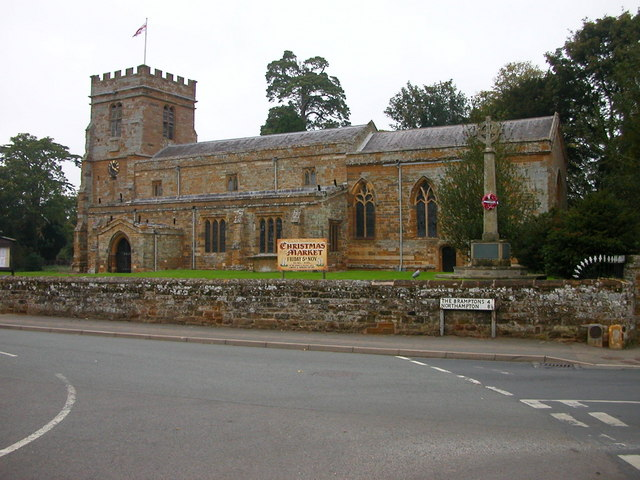
St Mary's Church, East Haddon

The oldest building in the village is St Mary's Church, parts of which date from the 12th century, but it was mostly rebuilt in the 14th century. The font is one of the oldest parts of the church, and its bells were installed in 1621 with a fifth added in 1731. The first ever recorded peal on five bells was rung on New Year's Day 1756, lasting over three hours with 5,040 changes.

The nearby Vicarage on Vicarage Lane was built by Reverend Locock in 1856, which is a stone building in the Gothic style. It is rumoured that a tunnel connects the Vicarage with the Manor on Main Street, which itself dates back to the early 1600s. The Old Chapel on Holdenby Road was built much later in 1811.

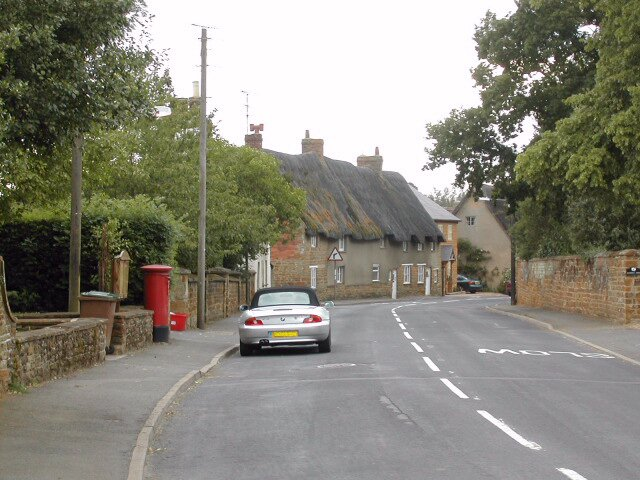
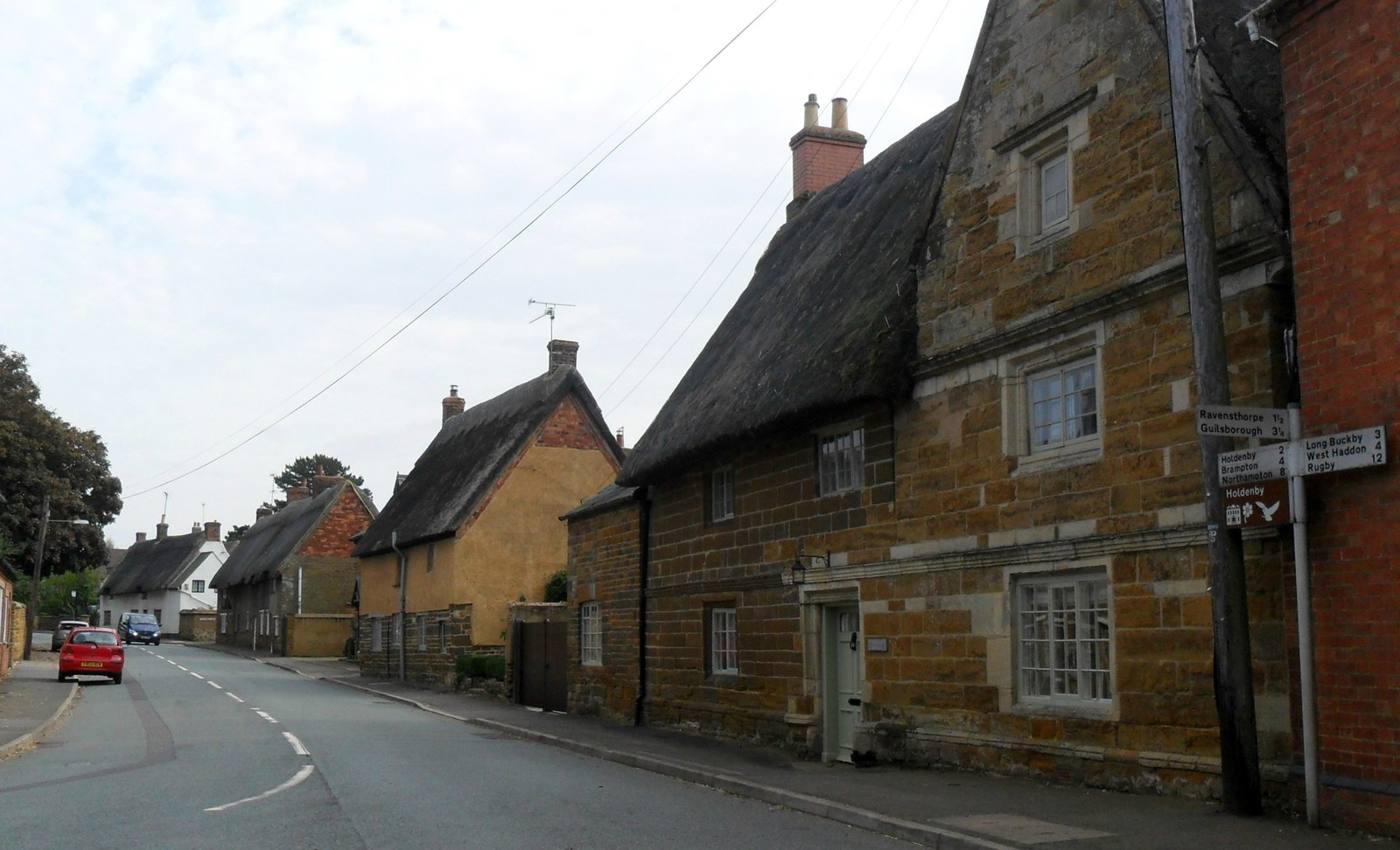
Thatched cottages on Main Street

There are a number of thatched stone cottages within the village, many of which were built with local stone believed to have come from the demolished palace at Holdenby House and others from cob. Well Cottage is believed to be the oldest cottage in the village, dating back to either the 15th or early 16th century.

Historic England-listed cottages include Thatched House on Main Street, and Gardeners House (formerly within East Haddon Hall grounds) on Ravensthorpe Road, which both date back to the 17th century. The Old House, Walcott House, Hall Farmhouse and Hall Farm Cottage on Main Street are also all listed stone buildings and date back to the 18th century.

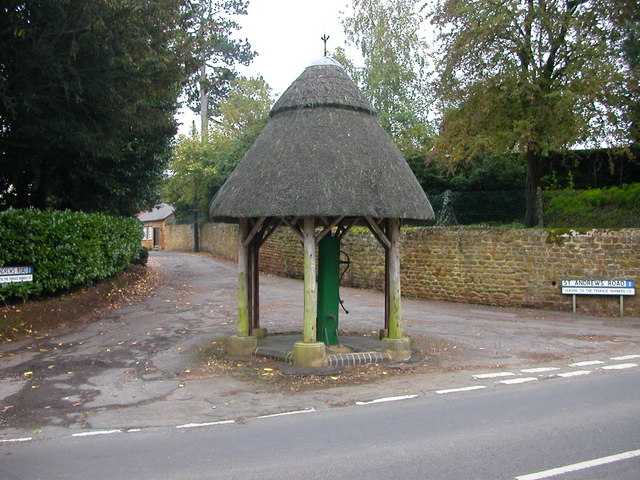
The historical thatched water pump dates back to 1550

A key feature of the village is the old thatched water pump which was constructed in 1550 and in use until the 1920s. During the First World War, a lorry hit the pump and knocked the top off, but this was restored with the use of a crane. In 1890, a stone water tower was built in the gardens of the old post office; it used to supply the village before the arrival of mains water. Haddonstone, a stone supplier business, occupies the old Forge House on Church Lane, which is listed and dates back to the 17th century. The old fire station on Main Street was built in 1865, but it was closed in 1945 and is now a bus shelter.

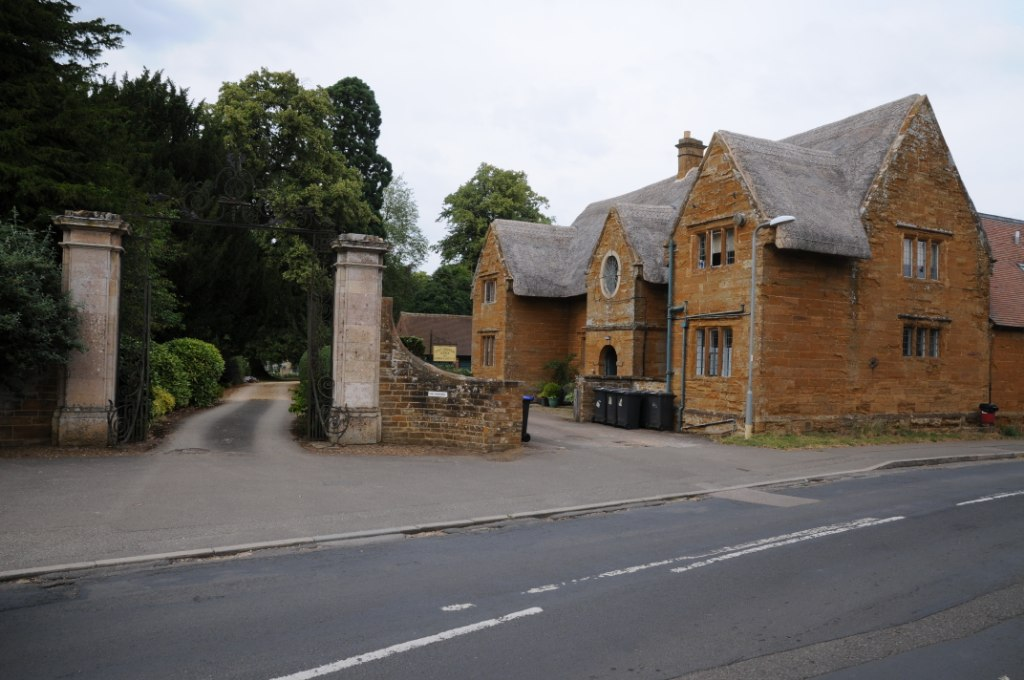
The gates and old stable block to East Haddon Hall

East Haddon Hall is a Grade I listed building and was built in 1780 for the Sawbridge family by John Wagstaff, a builder from Daventry. It was built to a design by John Johnson of Leicester. The Sawbridge family lived there until the late 19th century when it was sold to politician David Guthrie who panelled the hall's interiors and remodelled the gardens with assistance from garden designers Gertrude Jekyll and Edwin Lutyens in 1897; only fragments of the formal rose gardens and a sundial remain. In 1919, large parts of the estate, mainly agricultural land and farms, were auctioned off. East Haddon Hall became a maternity hospital during the 1940s and later a girls boarding school in the 1960s, before being sold in 1971 and becoming a private residence again.

The Hall Flats, an old sandstone building to the south of the hall, has a 1663 date stone and were part of the old stable block to the hall.

The Red Lion Inn can be traced back to 1765, although the present building was previously used as an off license while the inn was in what is now Hall Farm to the west of the premises. The Red Lion has been in its present home since the early 20th century, where it continues to trade as a pub, restaurant and hotel under the Wells & Co company. The Red Lion Cottage within the grounds is listed and was built in 1695.

== Transport ==
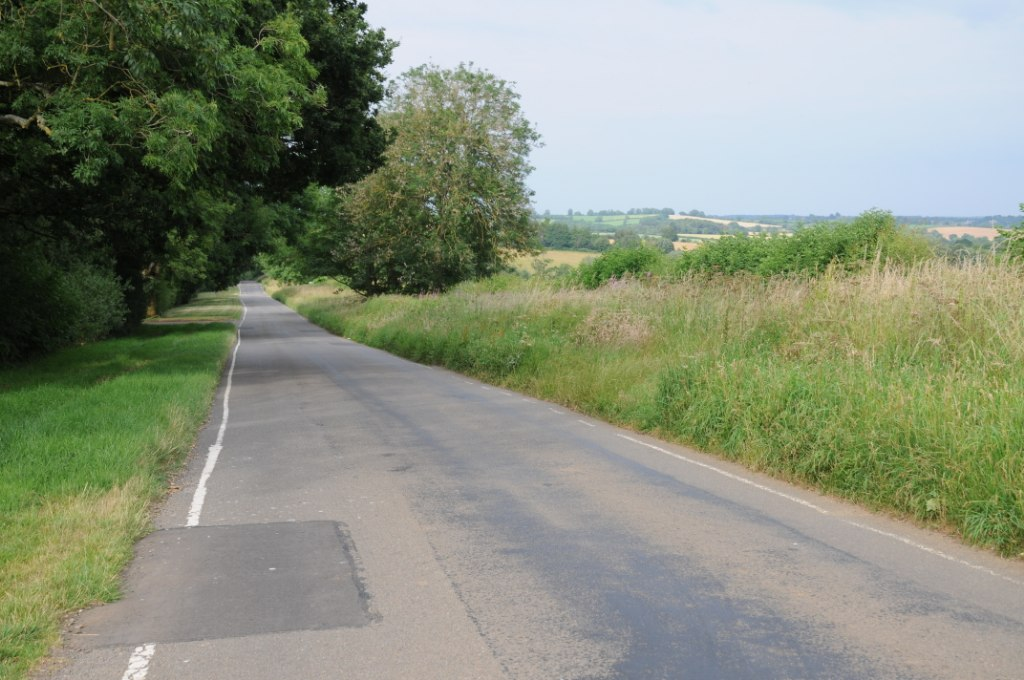
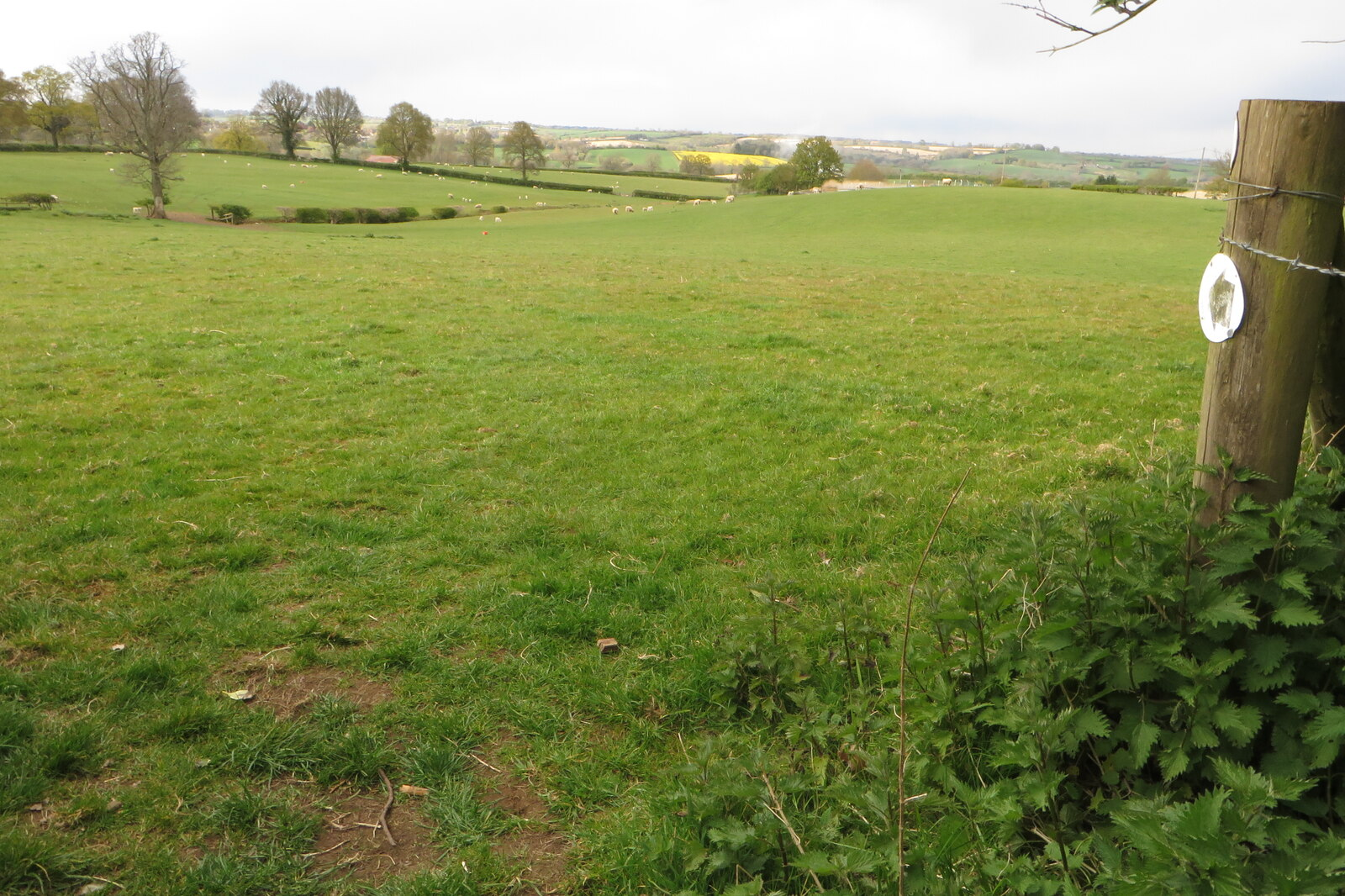
A country road and public footpath in the parish

East Haddon is served by the main A428 road, which passes the southern edge of the village. Junction 1 of the A14 road is also 8 miles north of the village which provides connections eastwards and westwards.

Further afield, junctions 16 and 18 of the M1 motorway are approximately 8 miles from the village.

Long Buckby railway station is the closest railway station with services by West Midlands Trains. It lies on the Northampton loop of the West Coast Main Line running between Birmingham New Street and London Euston.

The former Althorp Park railway station was situated to the south of East Haddon, but closed in 1960 and was later demolished.

Regular Stagecoach Midlands bus services connect East Haddon to Northampton, Long Buckby, West Haddon, Crick and Rugby.

There is a network of public footpaths across the village as well as two long-distance footpaths, Macmillan Way and Via Beata, which both skirt the eastern side of the parish.

== Notable people ==
- David Guthrie, politician, resided at East Haddon Hall in the late 19th century/early 20th century
- Long John Baldry, blues singer who inspired the stage name of singer Elton John, was born at East Haddon Hall in 1941
- Susannah York, actress, attended East Haddon Hall School in the 1950s
- David Tindle, artist, lived at the Old Chapel in the village in the 1970s
