= Welton railway station =

Former railway station in Northamptonshire, England

Coordinates: 52.3074°N 1.126°W

Welton
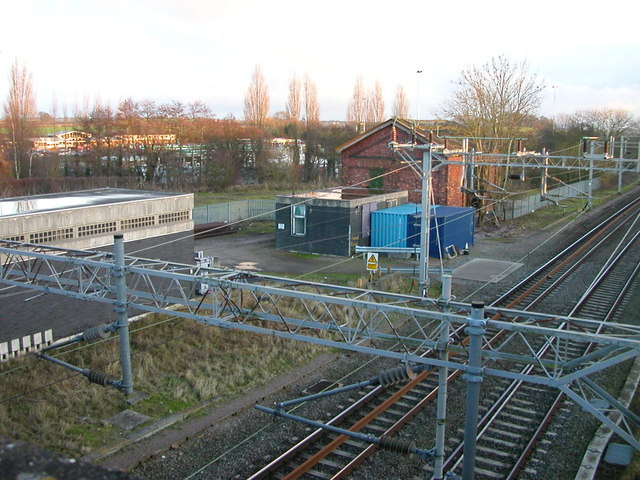
- The site of the station in 2009.

General information
- Location: Welton and Watford, West Northamptonshire; England
- Platforms: 2

Other information
- Status: Disused

History
- Original company: London and Birmingham Railway
- Pre-grouping: London and North Western Railway
- Post-grouping: London, Midland and Scottish Railway

Key dates
- 1838: Opened as Crick
- 1881: Renamed Welton
- 1958: Closed to passengers
- 1964: Closed to goods
Location

Welton was a railway station on the West Coast Main Line serving the villages of Welton and Watford in Northamptonshire. The station was opened in 1838 as part of the London and Birmingham Railway. It was located closer to Watford than to Welton, however it was named after the latter in order to avoid confusion with the much larger town of Watford further south. The station had an unusual arrangement of staggered platforms, one platform on each side of the road bridge. This was because of the confined site, being hemmed in by the Grand Union Canal and A5 road.

The station became part of the London and North Western Railway in 1846, which itself became part of the London Midland and Scottish Railway during the Grouping of 1923. The line then passed on to the London Midland Region of British Railways on nationalisation in 1948.

The station closed to passengers in 1958 and to goods in 1964. Today the site of the station is right next to the modern day Watford Gap service station on the M1 motorway. The only physical remains of the station today is a former goods shed alongside the tracks.

Preceding station	Historical railways	Following station
Rugby; Line and station open	London and North Western Railway; West Coast Main Line	Weedon; Line open, station closed
