= Coton, Northamptonshire (lost settlement) =

Deserted village of Coton
- Lost settlement
- Coton within Northamptonshire
- Coordinates: 52°20′30″N 1°0′45″W
- Country: England
- State: Northamptonshire
- Region: East Midlands
- District: Daventry
- Municipality: Ravensthorpe
- Map Ref: SP673717

The lost village of Coton is located around the environs of the hamlet of Coton and Coton Manor House in the English county of Northamptonshire.

== History ==
The lost village of Coton has an entry as an independent manor in the Domesday Book of 1086. Then the population was recorded as nine residents. Not much else is known after that survey about Coton until the 17th century when it was recorded that there were eight households paying the 1673 Hearth Tax. In 1791 there were 17 houses in the village. By 1839 this number had reduced to 15.

== Remains today ==
Coton lies entirely along today’s single street that runs through the hamlet. On the western side of the street today there are no dwellings but in 1839 records show that there were six dwellings and a farm to the north of these; all have now been destroyed. Also the land between the main street and the valley below shows signs of paddocks, platforms and closes in the form of earthworks in the recent past. Unfortunately much of these earthworks have been ploughed out in recent times.
