= Coton, Northamptonshire =

Hamlet in Northamptonshire, England

Coordinates: 52.3374°N 1.0107°W

Coton
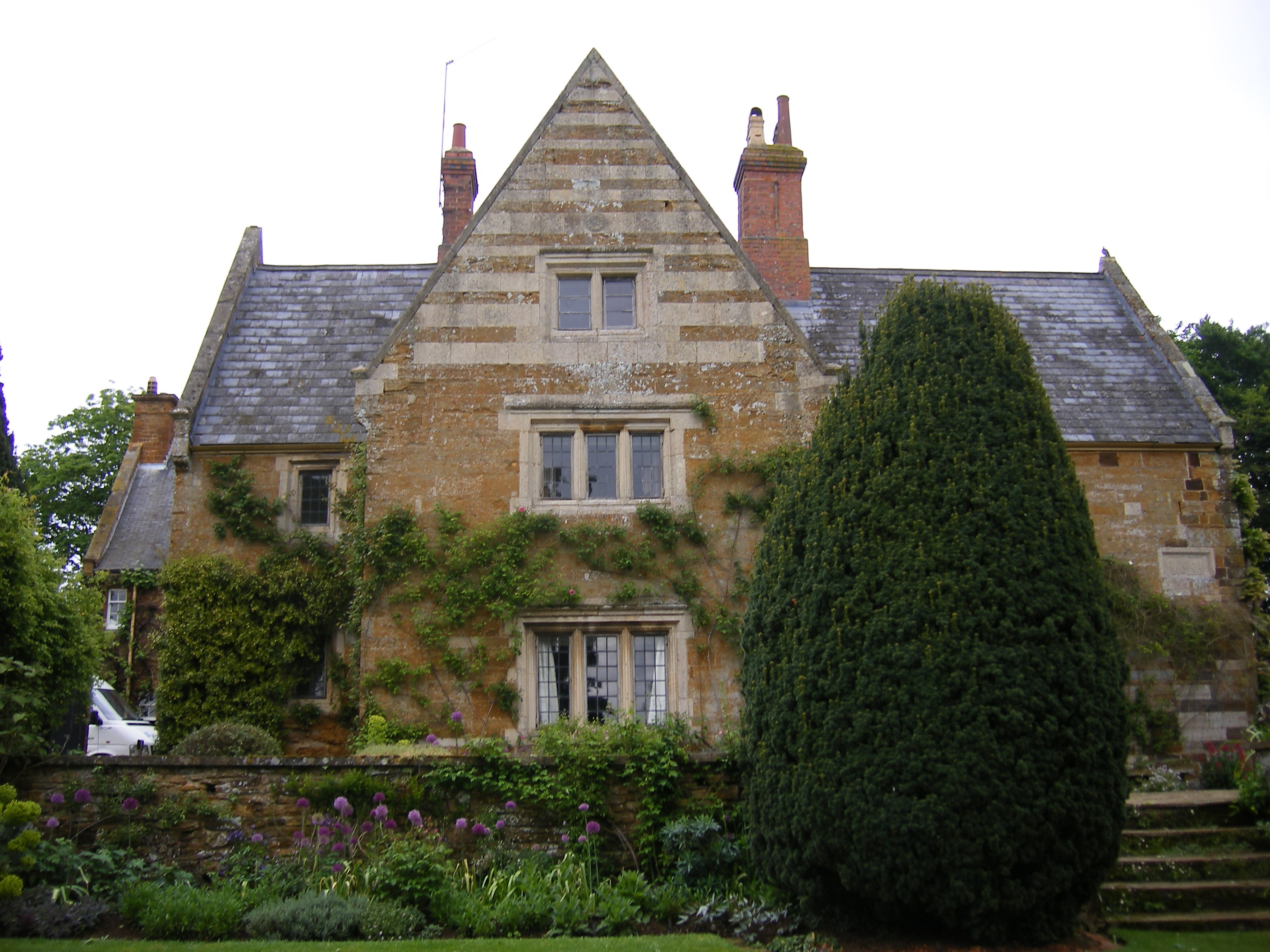
- Coton Manor

- Location within Northamptonshire
- OS grid reference: SP6771
- Civil parish: Ravensthorpe
- Unitary authority: West Northamptonshire
- Ceremonial county: Northamptonshire
- Region: East Midlands
- Country: England
- Sovereign state: United Kingdom
- Post town: Northampton
- Postcode district: NN6
- Dialling code: 01604
- Police: Northamptonshire
- Fire: Northamptonshire
- Ambulance: East Midlands
- UK Parliament: Daventry

Coton is a hamlet and former civil parish, now in the parish of Ravensthorpe, in the West Northamptonshire district, in the ceremonial county of Northamptonshire, England. It is located between Guilsborough and Ravensthorpe. Coton Manor is a popular visitor attraction for its gardens and bluebell woods. In 1931 the parish had a population of 83.

== History ==
The hamlet's name means 'At the cottages'. In 1866 Coton became a civil parish, on 1 April 1935 the parish was abolished and merged with Ravensthorpe.

== See also ==
Coton, Northamptonshire (lost settlement)
