= All Saints' Church, West Haddon =

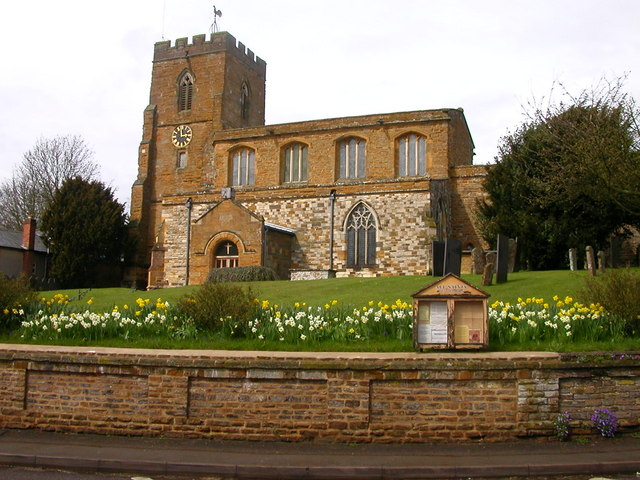
- All Saints' Church, West Haddon
- 52.3410°N 1.0764°W
- Denomination: Church of England
- Website: http://www.stlawrences.org.uk/west-haddon/

Administration
- Province: Canterbury
- Diocese: Diocese of Peterborough
- Archdeaconry: Northampton
- Deanery: Brixworth

Clergy
- Vicar: Rev Graham Collingridge

All Saints' Church is an Anglican church and the parish church of West Haddon, Northamptonshire. It is a Grade I listed building and stands on the north side of the High Street.

There is no reference to a church or priest in the entry for West Haddon in the Domesday Book.

The main structure of the present building was erected in the 12th to 14th centuries, with further work in the 17th and 19th centuries. The church now consists of a nave, north and south aisles, chancel and west tower. A detailed description appears on the Historic England website.

== Monuments ==
Three chest tombs in the churchyard, all constructed of lias ashlar, are Grade II listed buildings in their own right. The descriptions on the Historic England website are:

- Early 18th century. Bolection moulding pilasters at corners. About 6 metres south of the south aisle.
- Late 17th century. Panelled sides with large chamfered slab over. About 9 metres south of chancel.
- Early 18th century. Plain pilasters. Partly legible inscription. Has close relationship to Church of All Saints. About 2 metres south of chancel.

The last of this list appears to be mistaken in claiming an 18th-century origin, as the inscription that can still be read on it is consistent with that recorded early in the 18th century by John Bridges:

"Here lyeth honest Griggory,
Which was a true friend to the Ministry;
And the soul’s true friend for eternity,
And one of the best fathers to his ability;
Hee studdied the true form of Christianity,
The which he hoped would abound to posterity.
Grigory Palmer Minister of West-Haddon 52
years and odd months: it being the place of his
Nativity; in which parish he first received his
breath, and also ended his last the 11 day of June
1693. Hee being 85 years, 5 months, and odd
days old."

== Registers ==
The parish registers survive from 1653, the historic registers being deposited at Northamptonshire Record Office.

== Benefice ==
West Haddon is part of a united Benefice along with Long Buckby, Watford and Winwick. Each parish retains its own church building.
