= West Haddon =

Village in Northamptonshire, England

Coordinates: 52.340°N 1.077°W

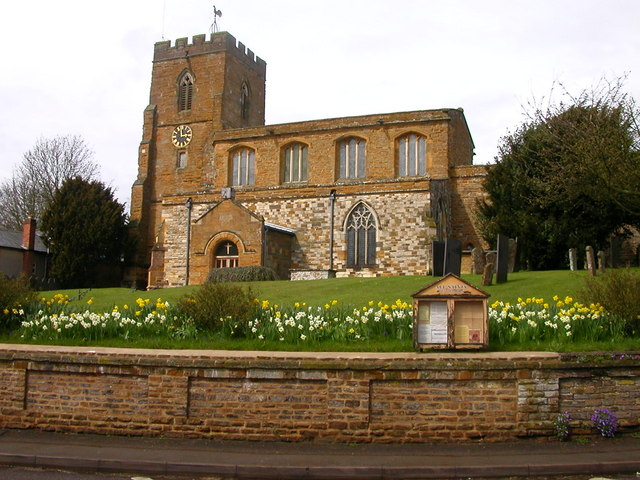
- All Saints’ Church, West Haddon

- Location within Northamptonshire
- Population: 1,718 (Including Winwick. 2011 Census)
- OS grid reference: SP629717
  - London: 81 miles (130 km)
- Civil parish: West Haddon
- Unitary authority: West Northamptonshire
- Ceremonial county: Northamptonshire
- Region: East Midlands
- Country: England
- Sovereign state: United Kingdom
- Post town: NORTHAMPTON
- Postcode district: NN6
- Dialling code: 01788
- Police: Northamptonshire
- Fire: Northamptonshire
- Ambulance: East Midlands
- UK Parliament: Daventry

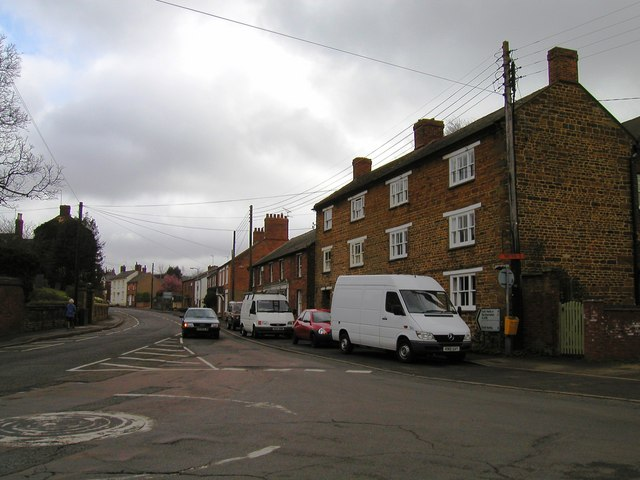
High Street, West Haddon

West Haddon is a village in Northamptonshire, England, about 11 miles (18 km) north-west of Northampton and 7 miles (11 km) east of Rugby and just off the A428 road which by-passes the village. The population of civil parish was 1,718 at the 2011 Census. The villages of West Haddon and Crick were by-passed by the A428 road from Rugby to Northampton when the Daventry International Rail Freight Terminal (DIRFT) was built in 1996 near junction 18 of the M1 motorway, 3 miles (4.8 km) west of the village. There are many services and pubs including the barbershop and the Pytchley Which serves a mean Cheesy Chips for a fiver

== History ==
The name 'Haddon' means 'hill which is heathy'. ‘West’ to distinguish from East Haddon.

The fields of West Haddon were the location for an enclosure riot in 1767. An advertisement was made in the county newspaper for a football game that was to be played in those fields. The football game was a means to assemble a mob which tore down fences and burned them, protesting against the laws that were then being enacted that allowed wealthy landowners to lay claim to what was once public land.

== Notable buildings ==
The Historic England website contains details of a total of 32 listed buildings in the parish of West Haddon, all of which are Grade II except for All Saints’ Church which is Grade I. These include:

- All Saints’ Church, High Street
- Redmoor House, Guilsborough Road – mid 17th-century farmhouse.
- Brownstones, 2 High Street – former Vicarage, mainly built in the mid-18th century, with a 1612 datestone that may not be original.
- The Hall, 14 Station Road – an early 19th-century house with alterations made in 1946.

== Facilities ==
It also has a General Stores and a Londis shop which incorporates a branch of the Post Office Ltd. There are two public houses, The Crown, which was recently refurbished and The Sheaf Inn, which re-opened in September 2018. The Pytchley Hotel is named after the local Pytchley Hunt.

== Internet ==
In 2003, a group of technology experts from the village and the village of Winwick grouped together to provide wireless internet for both villages, as British Telecom would not upgrade the local exchange to broadband internet. The system ran successfully until October 2004 when BT broadband was installed.

== Sport and activities ==
The village has many provisions for sport, with two large playing fields, used for men's football, at the north end of the village, a small children's play area, a tennis court, a pétanque area, a cricket pitch with pavilion and car park, and links to numerous countryside paths, such as the Jurassic Way. In the middle of the village there is a bowls lawn. West Haddon has many active sports clubs, such as a tennis club, bowls club, 3 senior football teams, several youth football teams, a cricket team, a bowls club a petanque club and a table tennis club.

West Haddon Players is a local amateur dramatics society founded in 1978.

== School ==
The village's primary school is West Haddon Endowed Church of England Primary School. Details of a series of reports on the school can be found in the relevant section of the Ofsted website. There were 233 pupils on the roll at the time of the inspection in December 2024.

Secondary school children in the village generally attend Guilsborough School in Guilsborough, Lawrence Sheriff School for Boys, Rugby High School for Girls or Rugby School.

== Notable residents ==
- Marcia Williams - Baroness Falkender of West Haddon, former Private Secretary to Harold Wilson, Prime Minister.
