= Northamptonshire witch trials =

1612 executions in Northampton, England

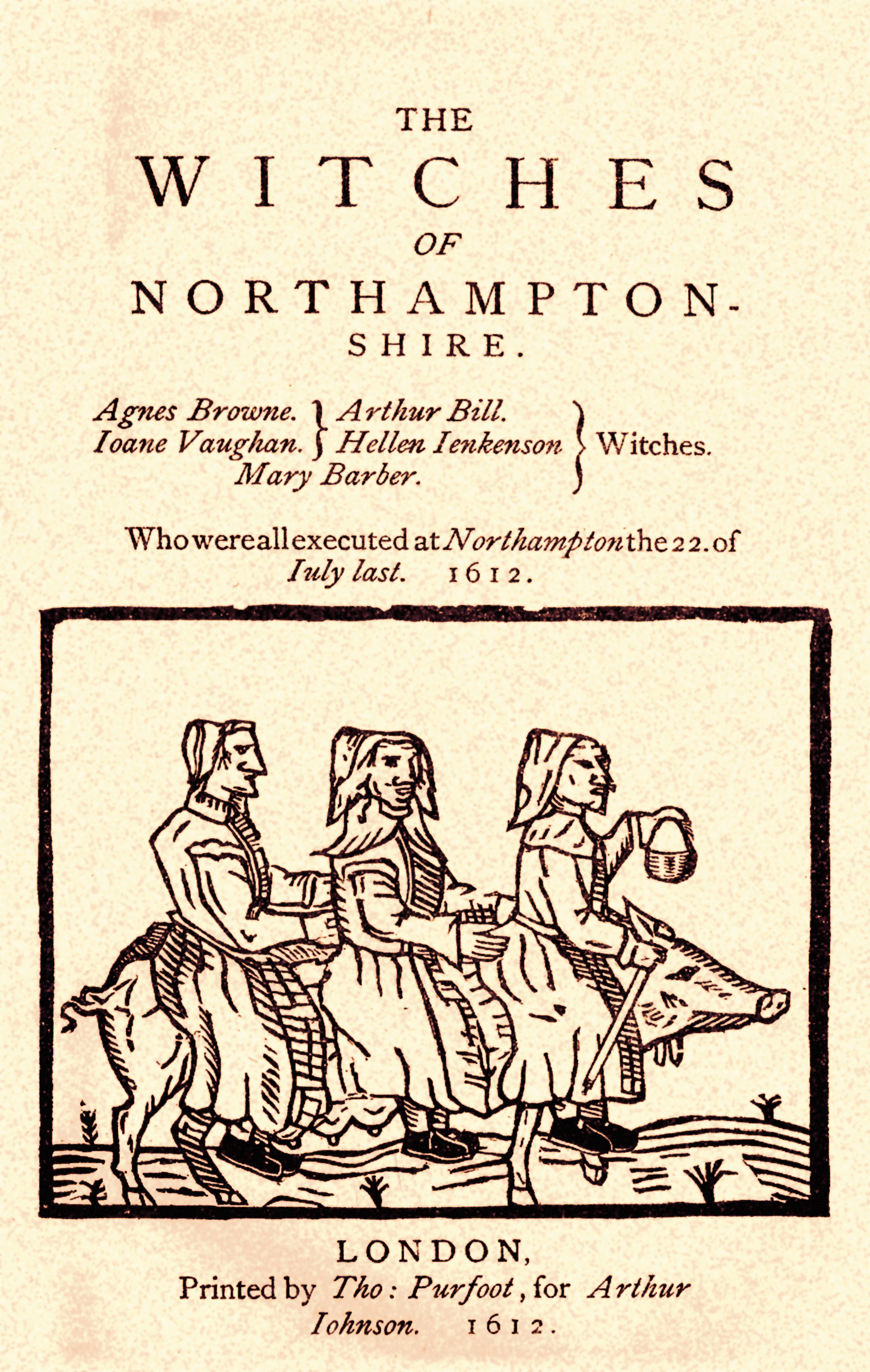
The titlepage of the 1612 pamphlet "The Witches of Northamptonshire" showing three witches riding on a sow

The Northamptonshire witch trials mainly refer to five executions carried out on 22 July 1612 at Abington Gallows, Northampton. In 1612 at the Lent Assizes held in Northampton Castle a number of women and a man were tried for witchcraft of various kinds, from murder to bewitching of pigs. There are two main accounts of these witches being tried. However they differ on how many witches were tried, who they were and exactly what they were supposed to have done.

This was a significant event, not because of the accusations themselves, but because it was one of the earlier documented cases in which the "dunking" method was used in Britain. It was also a case in which more than one person was singled out; rather, an entire group was accused.

One account is a manuscript of unknown authorship referenced as B.L. (British Library) Sloane 972 (f. 7) in which the writer shows an interest in the two witches' victims, Mistress Elizabeth Belcher and her brother Master William Avery. It names Agnes Browne and daughter Joan Browne (or Vaughan), Jane Lucas, Alce Harrys, Catherine Gardiner, and Alce Abbott and states they were jointly indicted for harming Belcher and Avery. Arthur Bill, Helen Jenkenson and Mary Barber are not mentioned, but does mention three women of the Wilson family. The text of the manuscript has been reproduced.

The second source comes from a pamphlet of 1612 titled The Witches of Northamptonshire (London, 1612) also an unknown author reproduced here. Who details the immoral lives of the witches and the godliness of their victims and misses out a few facts of the Belcher/Avery story and recants gossip rather than having a personal acquaintance with the trial. The pamphlet focuses on Agnes Browne and her daughter Joan Browne(or Vaughan), Arthur Bill, Helen Jenkenson and Mary Barber. Bill, Jenkenson and Barber were unconnected to the murder case of Belcher/Avery and came from a different part of Northamptonshire.

It is possible that the witches were arraigned on different days, by different juries, and that each writer was only present at some of the trials. The Belcher/Avery cases was quite sensational at the time with its well-born but strangely afflicted victims, whilst other witch trials being secondary. This was because their cases were everyday or because they were less directly involved. Some witches may have been acquitted and so less important to reporters and readers.

They may have been a precursor to the Pendle witch trials, which began some weeks later and ended with executions in August of the same year.

== Executions ==
Those executed at Northampton were:

- Arthur Bill of Raunds
- Mary Barber of Stanwick
- Agnes Browne of Guilsborough
- Joan Browne/Vaughan (daughter of Agnes) of Guilsborough
- Helen Jenkinson of Thrapston

The trials may also refer to two women: Elinor Shaw and Mary Philips, who were burned at Northampton in 1705 for witchcraft. They reputedly made a jailor dance naked in the courtyard for a full hour.

== Others accused ==
Although the above were recorded in the original tracts of the time, subsequent tracts have also mentioned the following women as accused in 1612, but without evidence that they were never executed:

- Katherine Gardiner
- Joan Lucas
- Alice Harris
- Alice Abbott
- Three 'Wilsons'

In addition, Arthur Bill's mother and father are also said to have been dunked and both floated, condemning them as witches. Ewen explains that the tracts suggest they both committed suicide in prison, although there is an alternative story in the same book which says that the father renounced his family to save his own neck after which the mother slit her throat rather than stand trial.

This was the first recorded use of water-ordeal in England to test witches.

Finally, there is mention of one Mother Rhodes who lived just outside Ravensthorpe, the next village up from Guilsborough. There is further reference to her in the folklore of Guilsborough.

== Bibliography ==
- Gibson, Marion (12 October 2006). Witchcraft and Society in England and America, 1550-1750. A&C Black. ISBN 9780826483003.
- Gibson, Marion (3 November 2018). Early Modern Witches: Witchcraft Cases in Contemporary Writing. Taylor & Francis. ISBN 978-0415215800.
- Rosen, Barbara (3 November 1991). Witchcraft in England, 1558-1618. University of Massachusetts Press. ISBN 9780870237539.
