= Nortoft =

Coordinates: 52.35362°N 1.01037°W

Nortoft was once a distinct hamlet between the Northamptonshire village of Guilsborough and the main road connecting Leicester and Northampton (now the A5199) in the English Midlands.

However, due to Guilsborough's expansion the two communities are now merged.

Nortoft was originally a Saxon hamlet and was separate from Guilsborough through medieval times. Its Saxon origins have been recorded and it was built along the spring line in the fields below Nortoft Cottage. Here lies evidence of possible tofts in the form of building platforms, with a possible watercourse servicing a pond. Nortoft Cottage is built around a very old cob cottage, possibly medieval, and the location may well have been part of the Saxon village settlement, and so is one of the oldest, if not the oldest, house in the village. In Guilsborough village there is recorded evidence of a large Iron Age fortified settlement, and remains of a small fortified Roman settlement can still be seen as a raised bank below the church, at the corner of the High Street and the Coton Road. Cromwell camped at Guilsborough the night before the Battle of Naseby (14 June 1645) and so would have marched through Nortoft on the way to battle.
