= Ladbroke Hall =

Coordinates: 52.2248°N 1.3940°W

- Location: Ladbroke, Southam
- Architectural style(s): Georgian architecture

Listed Building – Grade II

Ladbroke Hall is an 18th-century English country house at Ladbroke, near Southam, Warwickshire. It is a Grade II listed building and is now divided into apartments.

The Ladbroke estate was sold to William Palmer in 1633 and remained in his family for several generations. The present house was built in a Georgian style in the 18th century, to an H-shaped plan, the entrance frontage having two storeys with gabled attics above, and seven bays, the three central bays recessed.

In 1825, a later William Palmer of Ladbroke inherited the Derbyshire estate of his aunt Helen Morewood at Alfreton Hall and took the surname Palmer-Morewood. His grandson Charles Rowland Palmer-Morewood was High Sheriff of Derbyshire in 1871 and of Warwickshire in 1880. The 1881 British Census discloses his residence on the 360-acre (1.5 km^{2}) estate with a retinue of thirteen servants. Ladbroke's gambling company was founded by Messrs. Schwind and Pennington in 1886, as commission agents for horses trained at the hall. The name Ladbrokes was adopted in 1902, when Arthur Bendir joined the partnership, and operations were moved to London.

In 1966, Ladbroke Hall was the country house of Lord Rootes. In May 1967, it was reported that it had been sold to East Haddon Hall School, a boarding school for girls, to be used as its new home. The school was in business there in 1970, with seventy girls and with Mrs E. J. Lewis as head, under the new name of Ladbroke Hall, but closed in July 1971, when a sale of the school's furniture and equipment was advertised, including sixty beds.

The property was converted into some fifteen flats by Court and Son (Leamington) Ltd., and by October 1972 they were for sale through Locke and England.
