= East Haddon Hall School =

East Haddon Hall School was a boarding school for girls aged from eleven to seventeen located in East Haddon in West Northamptonshire, England. In 1967 it moved to Ladbroke Hall and took that name, before closing in 1971.

The school had been established by 1932, with Mrs Josephine Lewis as headmistress. She was still in post in 1967.

East Haddon Hall was also the home of Colonel (later Brigadier) and Mrs Scott Robson. Throughout the Second World War, from 1939 to 1945, East Haddon Hall was a maternity hospital. In 1945, it returned to being a school, with which the Scott Robsons were closely connected.

Although it was a secondary school, in 1965 girls were taught only up to the age of seventeen. In that year, there were sixty girls in the school. The school closed at East Haddon Hall in 1967, with Mrs Lewis stating that it was moving to a new home at Ladbroke Hall, in Warwickshire. The school was still there in 1970, with seventy girls and with Mrs Lewis still as headmistress, under the new name of Ladbroke Hall. The closure of the school was announced in June 1971, and the house itself was also put up for sale. In July, a sale of the school's furniture and equipment was advertised, including sixty beds.

== Notable former pupils ==
- Susannah York (1939–2011), actress
- Mary Helena Browning (born 1935), equestrian painter
- Lucy Sidney (born 1953), later Lady Middleton
