= Winwick, Northamptonshire =

Village in Northamptonshire, England

Coordinates: 52.3560°N 1.0839°W

Winwick
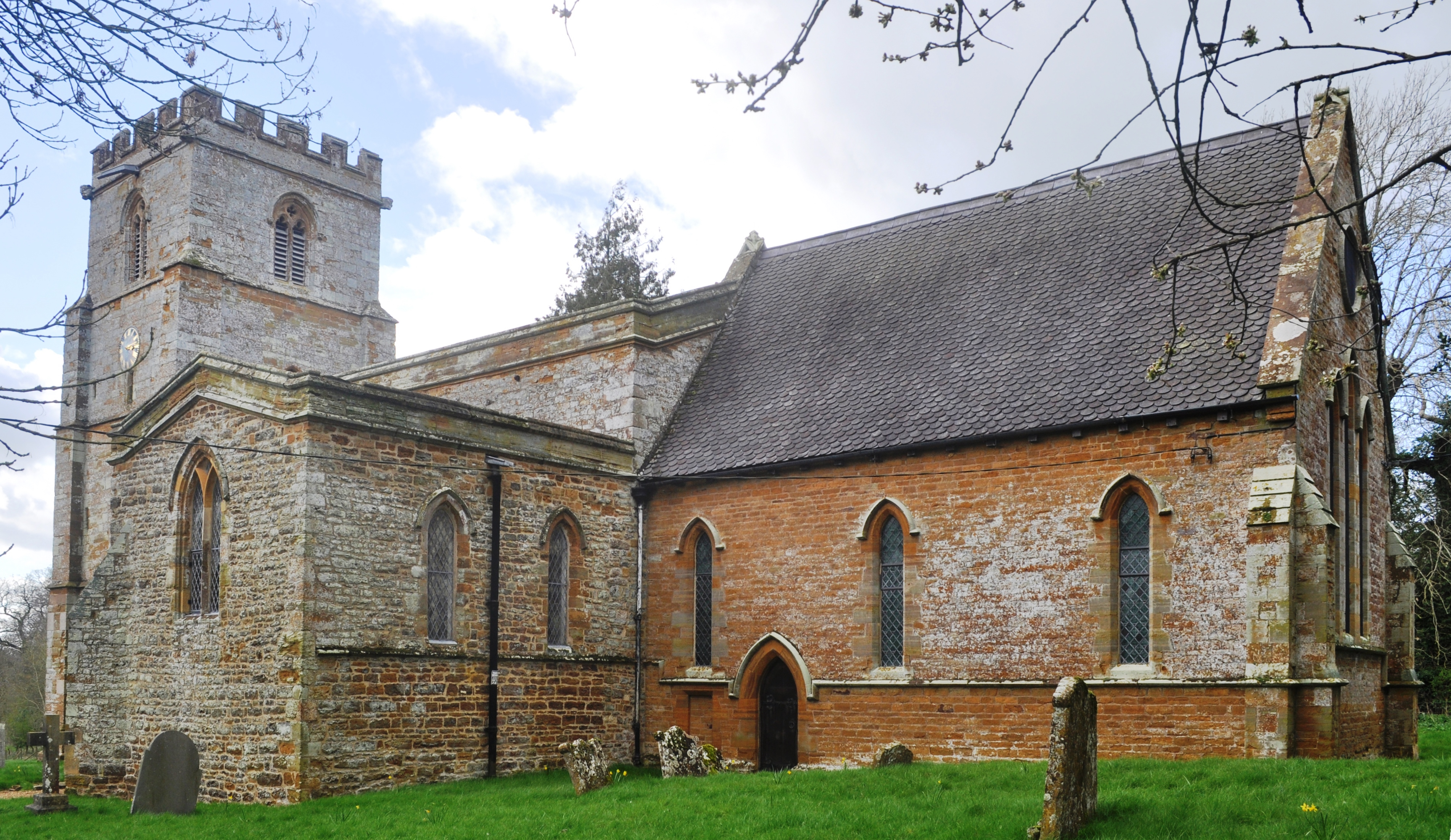
- St Michael & All Angels' Church in March 2024

- Location within Northamptonshire
- OS grid reference: SP6273
- Unitary authority: West Northamptonshire
- Ceremonial county: Northamptonshire
- Region: East Midlands
- Country: England
- Sovereign state: United Kingdom
- Post town: Northampton
- Postcode district: NN6
- Dialling code: 01788
- Police: Northamptonshire
- Fire: Northamptonshire
- Ambulance: East Midlands
- UK Parliament: Daventry

Winwick is a small village, a lost settlement and civil parish in West Northamptonshire in England. The modern settlement is north of West Haddon. A 16th-century brick manor house remains on the site. The population is included in the civil parish of West Haddon.

== Name ==
The village's name means 'specialised farm of Wina'. A few spellings show that it could be 'specialised farm in a nook'. However, the name could come from the Old English 'wicincel' meaning 'small specialised farm'.

== Buildings ==
The Historic England website contains details of a total of 16 listed buildings in the parish of Winwick, all of which are Grade II with the exception of the following, which are Grade II*:

- St Michael & All Angels' Church
- Winwick Manor (south wing)
- A gate arch to the south of the south front of the Manor House

== Politics ==
The polling station for the village is a private dwelling which is unusual and one of the last few remaining in the UK.
