= 1958 in rail transport =

This article lists events related to rail transport that occurred in 1958.

== Events ==
=== January ===
- January
  - Unable to keep his promises to shareholders, Robert Ralph Young suspends dividends on New York Central stock, a factor in his subsequent suicide on January 25.
  - Last steam locomotive operated by Nederlandse Spoorwegen.
- January 1 – The Chicago & North Western Railway acquires the Litchfield and Madison Railway.

=== February ===
- February 4 – Canada's Kellog Commission releases a report on the use of firemen as part of diesel locomotive crews.
- February – The Alaska Railroad sells six ex-USATC S160 Class 2-8-0 locomotives to the standard gauge Ferrocarril de Langreo in northern Spain, where they are used on a new diversion built to avoid a cable railway. This will be the third Transatlantic crossing for #3410.

=== March ===
- March 4 – The Los Angeles Metropolitan Transit Authority begins operating the remnant passenger services of the Pacific Electric and Los Angeles Railway.
- March 13 – Queensland BB18¼ class locomotive No. 1089, completed by Walkers, Maryborough, Queensland, is the last main-line steam locomotive built in Australia.

=== April ===
- April 20 – The Key System discontinues streetcar service.
- April 26
  - Last day of regularly scheduled passenger service on the Maine Central Railroad Mountain Division.
  - Last run of the Baltimore and Ohio Railroad's Royal Blue.

=== May ===
- May 24 – The Pacific Electric Bellflower Line, then being operated by the Los Angeles Metropolitan Transit Authority, ceases passenger operations, relegating the West Santa Ana Branch to a freight line.

=== June ===
- June 22 – The Chicago Transit Authority Congress Branch opens for service in the median of the Eisenhower Expressway, pioneering the first use of rail rapid transit and a multi-lane automobile expressway in the same grade-separated right-of-way. It replaced the 1895-built Garfield Park 'L' route and alignment from Des Plaines Avenue, Forest Park to the Loop.
- June 25 – The Pennsylvania Railroad discontinues the Afternoon Steeler passenger train between Pittsburgh and Cleveland.

=== July ===
- July – General Motors Electro-Motive Division introduces the EMD SD24.
- July 7 – The Hudson & Manhattan Railroad reintroduces women-only cars on the railroad's commuter trains in New York City.
- July 17 – The Railway Enthusiasts Society is formed to promote rail transportation and preservation in New Zealand
- July 25 – Pacific Great Eastern Railway completes construction of the line to Fort St. John, British Columbia.

=== August ===
- August 9 – The Moccasin, the longest running named passenger train in Canada thus far, is discontinued.
- August 12 – The Transportation Act of 1958 passes in the US, loosening Interstate Commerce Commission regulation and guaranteeing loans to railroads.

=== September ===
- September – On the Drachenfels Railway, Königswinter, Germany, a rack railway train derails, killing 17.
- September 15 – A Central Railroad of New Jersey commuter train plunges off the Newark Bay Bridge while raised for water traffic, killing 48.

=== October ===
- October – After building only 59 examples of the type, Fairbanks-Morse and Canadian Locomotive Company discontinue construction of the H-24-66 model Train Master diesel locomotive.
- October 1 – Northern Ireland's Ulster Transport Authority and the Republic of Ireland's Córas Iompair Éireann take over from the Great Northern Railway Board in running the remaining cross-border route (Dublin–Belfast) of the Irish railway system. The GNR assets are split between the two state companies.

=== November ===
- November 1 – The Strasburg Rail Road is purchased by a non-profit group.

=== December ===
- December 31 – The Harcourt Street railway line between Dublin and Bray, Ireland, closes.

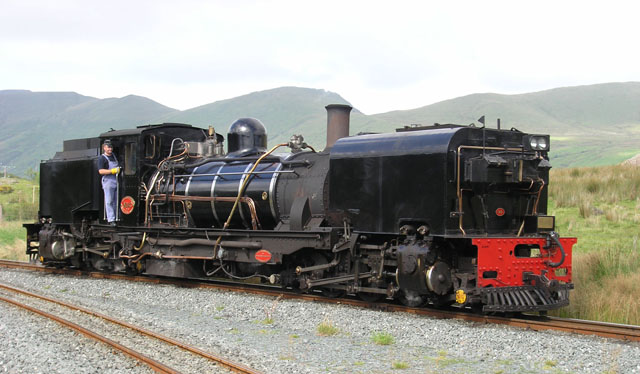
The last Beyer Garratt, returned from South Africa to the UK for the Welsh Highland Railway

=== Unknown date ===
- South African Railways takes delivery of its last steam locomotives for the 3 ft 6 in (1,067 mm) gauge, GMAM class Garratt locomotives.
- Last Garratt locomotive to be built in Manchester by Beyer, Peacock & Company is delivered as South African Railways NGG16 class no. 143 (2 ft (610 mm) gauge).
- SNCF electrifies its Paris–Lille line in France.
- Ernest S. Marsh succeeds Fred Gurley as president of the Atchison, Topeka & Santa Fe Railway.

== Deaths ==
=== January deaths ===
- January 25 – Robert Ralph Young, financier and controlling stockholder of the New York Central commits suicide after suspending company dividends (born 1897)
