= Guilsborough Academy =

Location
- West Haddon Road; Guilsborough, Northamptonshire, NN6 8QE; England; 52.355°N 1.026°W

Information
- Type: Academy
- Motto: Learning Without Limits
- Established: 1958
- Department for Education URN: 136489 Tables
- Ofsted: Reports
- Chair of Trustees: Tim Heydon
- Principal: Simon Frazer
- Gender: Mixed
- Age: 11 to 18
- Enrolment: 1317
- Houses: NNA + GLM
- Website: www.guilsborough.northants.sch.uk

Guilsborough Academy is a co-educational academy school in Guilsborough, Northamptonshire, England.

== History ==
The school was founded in September 1958 as Guilsborough Secondary Modern School and was officially opened in May 1959. Many of the buildings on the 28-acre (11 ha) site were built at that time or in the 1970s. The most recent addition, opened by Kettering MP Phil Sawford in September 2004, cost £1.3 million, and included a state-of-the-art sixth form centre. Guilsborough School was a secondary modern school until it became a day school in 1967, serving a large rural catchment. The school became a Technology College specialist school in 1998, before converting to academy status in 2011.

A previous school, Guilsborough Grammar School, an endowed school, had existed on another site in the centre of the village since c.1688.

== Achievement ==
The school was rated "Good" in 2008, "Outstanding" in 2011, and "Good" in 2014. The school's most recent Ofsted report was published in December 2023, and downgraded the school from "Good" to "Requires Improvement" by His Majesty's Inspector, Paul Halcfro. The report states that, "Teachers do not always check pupils’ understanding of what they have learned. This means that they do not always address misconceptions or gaps in pupils’ knowledge. As a result, pupils do not always learn as well as they could...bullying happens and [pupils] often hear homophobic language...some pupils choose to do little work in lessons..." and "Pupils said that staff are not always fair or consistent when dealing with behaviour issues.".

=== GCSE achievement (% 5 A*–C grades) ===
- 2011: 71%
- 2012: 74%
- 2013: 74%
- 2014: 66%
- 2015: 96%

Progress 8:

- 2023: 0.0 (Average)

== Awards ==
- Diana Memorial Award, autumn 2002
- Investor in People
- 2004 Artsmark Silver
- 2007 Artsmark Silver
- Northamptonshire Healthy Schools Silver Award
- Sportsmark

== Sport ==
Student Sam Heygate played for the England Under 16 A rugby union side in season 2007–08.

Ex-student Richard Stearman plays professional football for Sheffield United and has represented England up to Under 21 level.
