= Spring horizon =

A spring horizon or spring line is an impervious layer of rock reaching the surface, along which springs emerge. Since aquifers and impervious strata often lie on top of one another in horizontal layers, adjacent contact springs often emerge at the same height along a line called the spring horizon.

Held between an in impervious shale and fed by water logged rock, like limestone, spring horizons create a well of water. Water breaks through and percolates into the water logged rock in channels called joints. Other rocks able to fill a spring line include gypsum/salt, peat/coal, and basalt.

Being more soluble than limestone, gypsum and salt allow for faster percolation into the spring horizon and water table. Coal and peat sit under the water table. While not all basalt contains water, it has the ability to take in large amounts of surface water.

== Organisms ==
Spring horizons feed water to near by vegetation.

Stygobionts, specifically amphibians, can be found in and around spring horizons. The amount of fauna can change the composition of the horizon, while horizon factors can also effect the amphibian's development. Rairly, breeding amphibians lay eggs in springs fed by the spring horizons, similar to vernal pools.

== Conditions ==
Spring horizon temperatures stay consistent close to all year round, because of being fed with a constant flow of water.

When stored in limestone, spring horizons can produce tufa deposits in discharge areas.

== Digging effects ==
Spring lines are able to be moved or shifted with deep soil mixing, a construction tactic used to reinforce loose soils. They tend to move North or away from construction.
