= Ravensthorpe, Northamptonshire =

Village in Northamptonshire, England

Coordinates: 52.3286°N 1.0256°W

Ravensthorpe
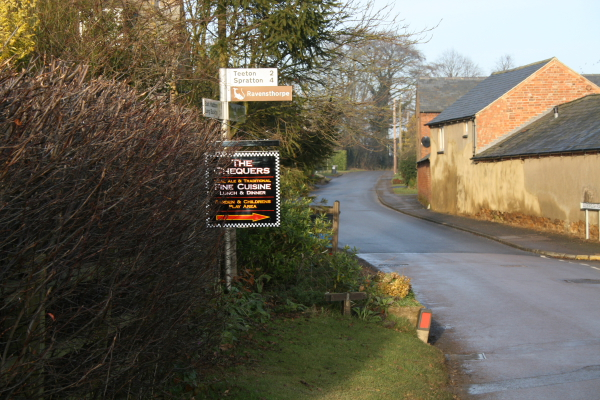
- Guilsborough Road, Ravensthorpe

- Location within Northamptonshire
- Area: 0.3325 km^{2} (0.1284 sq mi)
- Population: 646 (2011 census)
  - Density: 1,943/km^{2} (5,030/sq mi)
- OS grid reference: SP6670
- Unitary authority: West Northamptonshire
- Ceremonial county: Northamptonshire
- Region: East Midlands
- Country: England
- Sovereign state: United Kingdom
- Post town: Northampton
- Postcode district: NN6
- Dialling code: 01604
- Police: Northamptonshire
- Fire: Northamptonshire
- Ambulance: East Midlands
- UK Parliament: Daventry

Ravensthorpe is a village and civil parish in West Northamptonshire in England. The village lies approximately midway between Northampton and Rugby. The M1 motorway is six miles west and the nearest railway station is at Long Buckby. At the time of the 2001 census, the parish's population was 656 people, including Coton but falling slightly to 646 at the 2011 census.

The village's name means 'outlying farm/settlement (thorpe) of Hrafn'. Services within the village include a shop, the 'Chequers' pub, a playing field, a small park and a woodland maintained by the Woodland Trust.

== History ==
Iron Age and Roman pottery have been found around the village, indicating a possible settlement. By the time of the Domesday Survey, a settlement of either Anglo-Saxon or Scandinavian origin was recorded.

The St Denys Church was built in the 13th Century on a site believed to have been in use since the time of William the Conqueror.

Mother Rhodes, who lived just outside the village, was alleged to be a witch during the Northamptonshire Witch Trials. During the trial, testimonies against Joan Vaughn and Agnes Brown alleged that they were seen with other ‘witches’, Katherine Gardiner and Joan Lucus, visiting Mother Rhodes, who was found dying according to The Witches of Northamptonshire: "It was credthly reported that some fort-night before their apprehension, this Agnes Browne, one Ratherine Gardiner, and one Ioane Lucas, all birds of a winge, and all abyding in the Towne of Gilsborough did ride one night to a place (not aboue a mile off) called Rauenstrop, all vpon a Sowes backe, to sée one mother Rhoades, an old Witch that dwelt there, but before they came to her house the old Witch died, and in her last cast cried out, that there were three of her old friends coming to sée her, but they came too late, Howbeit shee would méete with them in another place within a month after. And thus much concerning Agnes Browne, and her daughter". Vaughn and Brown were executed on 22 July 1612.

== Geography ==
The civil parish of Ravensthorpe includes nearby Coton. Nearby tourist attractions include Coton Manor Garden, Althorp House, and Holdenby House.

== In popular culture ==
A village of the same name is present in the 2020 video game Assassin's Creed Valhalla which features prominently as the protagonist's home, although the fictionalised Ravensthorpe is in a different location of Ledecestrescire, meaning Leicestershire. According to the game's narrative director, Darby McDevitt, the fictional version was created without knowledge of the real location and the development team only found out about the similarity a few months before the game's launch. Lord of the manor Charlie Reeve declared a week-long commemorative event for the release of an in-game Yuletide festival, coinciding with local pub The Chequers releasing a special takeaway menu. By comparing in-game maps with actual geography, the real-life village is in the immediate proximity of the fictional one.

== Notable people ==
- John Mason (1600 – 1672), Deputy Governor of the Connecticut Colony, led the 1637 Mystic massacre during the Pequot War.
